= Outline of the psychiatric survivors movement =

Overview of and topical guide to the psychiatric survivors movement

The following outline is provided as an overview of and topical guide to the psychiatric survivors movement:

Psychiatric survivors movement – diverse association of individuals who are either currently clients of mental health services, or who consider themselves survivors of interventions by psychiatry, or who identify themselves as ex-patients of mental health services. The movement typically campaigns for more choice and improved services, for empowerment and user-led alternatives, and against the prejudices they face in society.

== What is the psychiatric survivors movement? ==
- The psychiatric survivors movement can be described as all of the following:
  - a political movement
  - a human rights movement
  - part of the disability rights movement
- Psychiatric survivors as a group is:
  - an advocacy group
  - a community
  - a special interest group

== Participants ==
- Victim of psychiatry
  - Mental health consumer
    - Mental patient : currently redirects to Mental disorder
      - Former mental patient
        - Lunatic

=== Supporters ===
- Richard Bentall
- Patch Adams
- Robert Whittaker
- The Radical Therapist

== History of the psychiatric survivors movement ==
- History of mental disorders

=== People ===
- 18th century
  - Samuel Bruckshaw
- 19th century
  - Elizabeth Packard
- Early 20th century
  - Clifford Whittingham Beers
- Late 20th century to the present
  - Linda Andre
  - Ted Chabasinski
  - Judi Chamberlin
  - Lyn Duff
  - Leonard Roy Frank
  - Kate Millett
  - David Oaks

== Issues ==
- Coercion
  - Involuntary treatment
  - Involuntary commitment
  - Outpatient commitment
- Mentalism (discrimination)

=== Pharmaceutical industry ===
- Pharmaceutical industry
- Allen Jones (whistleblower)
- Anatomy of an Epidemic

=== Harmful practices ===
- Eugenics
- Psychosurgery
- Electroconvulsive therapy
- Psychoactive drug
- Psychiatric drug epidemic

== Psychiatry ==
Psychiatry (outline)

- Mental disorder
  - History of mental disorder
- Mental Health
- Therapeutic relationship

=== Psychiatric services ===
- Services for mental disorders
- Care programme approach (UK)

=== Public agencies ===
- United Kingdom
  - England and Wales
    - Commissioners in Lunacy
- United States of America
  - Federal Bodies
    - National Council on Disability
    - New Freedom Commission on Mental Health

=== Legal framework for psychiatric treatment ===
See Outline of psychiatry#Legal framework for psychiatric treatment

== Organisations ==
=== Advocacy groups, by region ===
==== International/Cross-border groups ====
- Pan-African Network of People with Psychosocial Disabilities
- European Network of Users and Survivors of Psychiatry
- MindFreedom International
- TCI-Aisa
- GROW
- World Network of Users and Survivors of Psychiatry

==== United Kingdom ====
- Alleged Lunatics' Friend Society (19C)
- Survivors Speak Out (20C)
- United Kingdom Advocacy Network (20C)
- MindLink
- National Service User Network (21C)
- Mental Health Resistance Network (21C)

==== Norway ====
- We Shall Overcome
- Aurora
- Mental Helse
- White Eagle
- LPP

==== Canada ====
- Mental Patients' Association

==== Germany ====
- Socialist Patients' Collective
- Bundesverband Psychiatrie-Erfahrener BPE-eV
- International Association Against Psychiatric Assault

==== Netherlands ====
- Clientenbond
- Geesdrift

==== United States ====
- Committee for Truth in Psychiatry
- Hearing Voices Movement
- Hearing Voices Network
- Icarus Project
- Insane Liberation Front
- Mad Pride
- Mental Patients Liberation Front
- MindFreedom International
- National Empowerment Center
- Network Against Psychiatric Assault
- Mental Patients' Liberation Alliance

=== Self-help groups ===
- Self-help groups
  - Self-help groups for mental health

== Related movements ==
=== Anti-psychiatry movement ===
==== People ====
- Franco Basaglia
- David Cooper (psychiatrist)
- Michel Foucault
- R.D. Laing
- Loren Mosher
- Thomas Szasz anti-coercive psychiatry

==== Publications ====
- Against Therapy
- Anti-Oedipus
- Liberation by Oppression: A Comparative Study of Slavery and Psychiatry
- Madness and Civilization

==== Organisations ====
- American Association for the Abolition of Involuntary Mental Hospitalization

== See also ==
- Against Therapy
- Antipsychology
- Biopsychiatry controversy
- Democratic Psychiatry
- Feeble-minded
- Icarus Project
- Independent living
- Insanity
- Interpretation of Schizophrenia
- Involuntary treatment
- Liberation by Oppression: A Comparative Study of Slavery and Psychiatry
- Mad Pride
- Mad Studies
- Medicalization
- Mental patient
- MindFreedom International
- National Empowerment Center
- Peer support
- Peer support specialist
- Philadelphia Association
- Positive Disintegration
- Psychiatric rehabilitation
- Psychoanalytic theory
- Radical Psychology Network
- Recovery model
- Rosenhan experiment
- Self-advocacy
- Social firms
- Soteria
- Therapeutic community
- World Network of Users and Survivors of Psychiatry

People

- Judi Chamberlin
- Kate Millett
- Kingsley Hall
- Leonard Roy Frank
- Linda Andre
- Loren Mosher
- Lyn Duff
- Ted Chabasinski

Health and mortality

- Physical health in schizophrenia
- Schizophrenia and smoking
