= Linda Andre =

American activist (1959–2023)

Linda Andre (1959 – 2023) was an American psychiatric survivor activist and writer, living in New York City, who was the director of the Committee for Truth in Psychiatry (CTIP), an organization founded by Marilyn Rice in 1984 to encourage the U.S. Food and Drug Administration (FDA) to regulate electroconvulsive therapy (ECT) machines.

== Anti-ECT activism ==
Since receiving ECT in the early 1980s at age 25, Andre wrote and researched to help other ECT survivors cope with their cognitive and memory losses, and inform the general public about the risks of ECT. Linda was interviewed by 20/20, The Atlantic, the New York Times and the Washington Post.

Interviewed by the Los Angeles Times in 2003, Andre commented on a British study that found that when patients helped to design or conduct ECT surveys, only one third of the respondents claimed to find ECT helpful, but when doctors designed and conducted the surveys, three-fourths claimed to find ECT beneficial. "This is what happens when you ask patients what they think," said Andre, "...you get a completely different story from the one psychiatrists are telling." She and her friends formed the Committee for Truth in Psychiatry with over 500 former electric shock patients.

In 2009, her book, Doctors of Deception: What they don't want you to know about shock treatment, was published. Reviewing this work, James Wood, of the University of Edinburgh wrote in the journal the Social History of Medicine, "[O]ver the course of its 17 often meticulously researched chapters, Andre provides a useful contrast to the claims made in Edward Shorter and David Healy's recent paean to ECT and the men who were instrumental in its development (Edward Shorter and David Healy, Shock Therapy, 2007), and offers a potentially devastating critique of both ECT and the modern American psychiatric profession.

== Published works ==
- Andre, Linda (2001). "Memory loss: from polarization to reconciliation". Journal of ECT. 17 (3): 228–29. doi:10.1097/00124509-200109000-00022. PMID 11528324.
- Andre, Linda (2005). "ECT then and now". Psychiatric Services. 56 (4): 490–91. doi:10.1176/appi.ps.56.4.490-a. PMID 15812104. Archived from the original on 25 April 2005.
- Andre, Linda (2009). Doctors of Deception: What They Don't Want You to Know About Shock Treatment. New York. ISBN 978-0813546520.
- Andre, Linda (2023). Elektroschocks. In: Will Hall, Jenseits der Psychiatrie – Stimmen und Visionen des Wahnsinns im Madness Radio. Berlin & Lancaster: Peter Lehmann Publishing, pp. 60–62. ISBN 978-3-910546-23-3 (paperback), ISBN 978-3-910546-26-4 (e-book)

== See also ==
- Clifford Whittingham Beers
- Electroconvulsive therapy
- Elizabeth Packard
- Icarus Project
- Involuntary commitment
- Involuntary treatment
- Judi Chamberlin
- Kate Millett
- Leonard Roy Frank
- List of psychiatric consumer/survivor/ex-patient related topics
- Lyn Duff
- Mad Pride
- MindFreedom International
- National Empowerment Center
- Peter Lehmann
- Psychiatric survivors movement
- Ted Chabasinski
- World Network of Users and Survivors of Psychiatry
