= Outline of psychiatry =

Overview of and topical guide to psychiatry

The following outline is provided as an overview of and topical guide to psychiatry:

Psychiatry – medical specialty devoted to the study and treatment of mental disorders. These mental disorders include various affective, behavioural, cognitive, and perceptual abnormalities.

== What type of thing is psychiatry? ==
- Academic discipline – field of study with academic departments, curricula and degrees; national and international societies; and specialized journals.
- Scientific field (a branch of science) – widely recognized category of specialized expertise within science, and typically embodies its own terminology and nomenclature. Such a field will usually be represented by one or more scientific journals, where peer-reviewed research is published.
  - A natural science – field that seeks to elucidate the rules that govern the natural world using empirical and scientific methods.
  - A biological science – a branch of biology, which is concerned with the study of life and living organisms, including their structure, function, growth, origin, evolution, distribution, and taxonomy.
  - A behavioural science – a branch of psychology, which is concerned with the study of the emotional and cognitive functions of the mind and brain and of the person in the context of society.
- A medical specialty – branch of clinical practice, practised by physicians, psychologists, nurses, social workers, etc.

== Branches of psychiatry ==
=== Subspecialties of psychiatry ===
- Addiction psychiatry – focuses on evaluation and treatment of individuals with alcohol, drug, or other substance-related disorders, and of individuals with dual diagnosis of substance-related and other psychiatric disorders.
- Child and adolescent psychiatry – branch of psychiatry that specialises in work with children, teenagers, and their families.
- Cross-cultural psychiatry – branch of psychiatry concerned with the cultural and ethnic context of mental disorder and psychiatric services.
- Emergency psychiatry – clinical application of psychiatry in emergency settings.
- Forensic psychiatry – interface between law and psychiatry.
- Geriatric psychiatry – branch of psychiatry dealing with the study, prevention, and treatment of mental disorders in humans with old age.
- Liaison psychiatry – branch of psychiatry that specializes in the interface between other medical specialties and psychiatry.
- Military psychiatry – covers special aspects of psychiatry and mental disorders within the military context.
- Neuropsychiatry – branch of medicine dealing with mental disorders attributable to diseases of the nervous system.
- Social psychiatry – branch of psychiatry that focuses on the interpersonal and cultural context of mental disorder and mental wellbeing.

=== Approaches of psychiatry ===
- Biological psychiatry – approach to psychiatry that aims to understand mental disorders in terms of the biological function of the nervous system.
- Community psychiatry – approach that reflects an inclusive public health perspective and is practiced in community mental health services.
- Global Mental Health – area of study, research and practice that places a priority on improving mental health and achieving equity in mental health for all people worldwide.

== History of psychiatry ==
- History of psychiatry

== General psychiatry concepts ==
- Glossary of psychiatry
- Mental disorder
  - Classification of mental disorders
  - History of mental disorder
- Mental Health

== Psychiatric practice and standards ==
=== Doctor-patient relationship ===
- Therapeutic relationship

=== Nosological system ===
- Diagnostic and statistical manual of mental disorders
- International Statistical Classification of Diseases and Related Health Problems

=== Psychiatric diagnoses ===
- ADHD
- Bipolar disorder
- Mania
- Schizophrenia
  - History of schizophrenia
  - Dementia praecox

=== Instruments ===
- Mental status examination

=== Diagnostic practices ===
- Rosenhan experiment

== Psychiatric treatment ==
- Treatment of mental disorders

=== Chemical treatment ===
- Anxiolytics
  - Barbiturates
- Antidepressants
  - SSRI
- Antipsychotic
- Chemical imbalance theory
- Mood stabilizers
- Psychiatric medication
- List of psychiatric medications
- List of psychiatric medications by condition treated

=== Physical treatment ===
==== Electroconvulsive therapy ====
- Electroconvulsive therapy
  - History of electroconvulsive therapy in the United Kingdom

==== Insulin coma therapy ====
- Insulin shock therapy (defunct)

==== Psychosurgery ====
- Psychosurgery
  - Lobotomy (defunct)
  - Lobotomy instruments
    - Leucotome
    - Orbitoclast
  - Lobotomy patients
    - Howard Dully

==== Fever therapy ====
- Pyrotherapy (defunct)

=== Psychological treatment ===
- Psychotherapy
- List of psychotherapies

=== Legal frameworks of psychiatric treatment ===
- Diminished responsibility
- Forensic Psychiatry
- Informed consent
- Insanity
- Insanity defence
- Involuntary commitment
- Involuntary treatment
- Irresistible impulse
- M'Naghten Rules
- Macdonald triad
- Mens rea
- Mental health law
- Obligatory Dangerousness Criterion
- Outpatient commitment
- Psychiatric advance directive
- Sanity
- Therapeutic jurisprudence
- Ulysses pact
- Voluntary commitment

==== Australia ====
- Justices examination order
- Mental Health Review Tribunal of New South Wales

==== Ireland ====
- 1814-1922
  - Criminal Lunatics (Ireland) Act 1838
- From 1922–present
  - Mental Health Act 2001

==== Italy ====
- Basaglia Law
- Law 180

==== U.K. ====
- Care in the Community
- Criminal Lunatics Act 1800
- Idiots Act 1886
- Fixated Threat Assessment Centre
- Lunacy Act 1845
- Lunacy (Vacating of Seats) Act 1886
- Madhouses Act 1774
- Place of safety

===== England and Wales =====
- Approved Mental Health Professional
- Diminished responsibility in English law
- Mental Capacity Act 2005
- Mental Health Act 1983
- Mental Health Act 2007
- Mental Health Review Tribunal (England and Wales)
- Mental Treatment Act 1930
- Nearest relative

===== Scotland =====
- Adults with Incapacity (Scotland) Act 2000
- Forensic Network
- Mental Health (Care and Treatment) (Scotland) Act 2003
- Mental Health (Public Safety and Appeals) (Scotland) Act 1999

==== U.S.A. ====
- Adjudicative competence
- Civil confinement
- Civil Rights of Institutionalized Persons Act
- Competence (law)
- Duty to protect
- Duty to warn
- Forensic Mental Health Association of California
- List of criminal competencies
- Mental health courts
- PsychRights
- Ultimate issue (law)
  - Californian mental health law
    - 5150 (Involuntary psychiatric hold)
  - Florida mental health law
    - Florida Mental Health Act: the Baker Act

== Politics of psychiatry ==
=== Political movements ===
- Psychiatric survivors movement

==== Anti-psychiatry movement ====
- Anti-psychiatry

===== People in the anti-psychiatry movement =====
- Franco Basaglia
- David Cooper (psychiatrist)
- Michel Foucault
- R.D. Laing
- Loren Mosher
- Thomas Szasz

===== Anti-psychiatry publications =====
- Against Therapy
- Anti-Oedipus
- Liberation by Oppression: A Comparative Study of Slavery and Psychiatry
- Madness and Civilization

===== Anti-psychiatry organisations =====
- American Association for the Abolition of Involuntary Mental Hospitalization

== Psychiatric Institutions ==
=== General ===
- Asylums (book)
- Psychiatric hospital
  - History of psychiatric institutions
- Deinstitutionalization
- Psychiatric reform in Italy
- Titicut Follies

==== Australian psychiatric institutions ====
- List of Australian psychiatric institutions

== Psychiatric organizations ==
- American Board of Psychiatry and Neurology
- American Psychiatric Association
- American Neuropsychiatric Association
- Brazilian Association of Psychiatry
- Canadian Psychiatric Association
- Chinese Society of Psychiatry
- Democratic Psychiatry
- German Society of Psychiatry, Psychotherapy and Neurology
- Hong Kong College of Psychiatrists
- Independent Psychiatric Association of Russia
- Indian Psychiatric Society
- Irish College of Psychiatrists
- Israeli Psychiatric Association
- Italian Psychiatric Society
- Japanese Society of Psychiatry & Neurology
- Korean Neuropsychiatric Association
- Maryland Psychiatric Society
- National Institute of Mental Health
- Pakistan Psychiatric Society
- Royal Australian and New Zealand College of Psychiatrists
- Royal College of Psychiatrists
- Singapore Psychiatric Association
- South African Society of Psychiatrists
- World Psychiatric Association

== Persons influential in psychiatry ==
=== Psychiatrists ===
- List of psychiatrists

==== Academic psychiatrists by country ====
- Ireland
  - Patricia Casey
  - Anthony Clare

== See also ==
- Outline of medicine
- Outline of the psychiatric survivors movement
- Behavioral medicine
- Biopsychiatry controversy
- Clinical neuroscience
- Imaging genetics
- Neuroimaging
- Neurophysiology
- Psychiatrist
- Psychiatric epidemiology
- Psychiatric genetics
- Psychiatric survivors movement
- Psychosomatic medicine
- Psycho-oncology
- Psychopharmacology
- Psychosurgery
- Psychoanalysis

Lists

- Outline of the psychiatric survivors movement
- List of psychiatrists
- List of neurological disorders
- List of counseling topics
- List of psychotherapies
- List of psychiatric medications
  - List of psychiatric medications by condition treated
