= Ted Chabasinski =

American lawyer and human rights activist (1937–2025)

Ted Chabasinski Juris Doctor
- Born: Theodore Chabasinski; March 20, 1937; New York City, U.S.
- Died: November 6, 2025 (aged 88)
- Occupation: Former Directing Attorney for Mental Health Consumer Concerns
- Years active: 1971–2025
- Known for: Psychiatric survivor activist Leading successful campaign to ban the use of ECT in Berkeley, California (1982)
- Board member of: Former President, Support Coalition International
- Spouse: Judi Chamberlin (1972-1985)

Ted Chabasinski (March 20, 1937 – November 6, 2025) was an American psychiatric survivor, human rights activist and attorney who was based in Berkeley, California. At the age of six, he was taken from his foster family's home and committed to a New York psychiatric facility. Diagnosed with childhood schizophrenia, he underwent intensive electroshock therapy (now termed electroconvulsive therapy or ECT) and remained an inmate in a state psychiatric hospital until the age of seventeen. He subsequently trained as a lawyer and became active in the psychiatric survivors movement. In 1982, he was a leader in an initially successful campaign seeking to ban the use of electroshock in Berkeley, California.

Chabasinski died on November 6, 2025, at the age of 88.

== Early life ==
Chabasinski was born in New York to a Polish-born immigrant woman. His father was of Russian descent. In the period just before and after Chabasinski's birth, his birth-mother, who was poor, unmarried and had been given a diagnosis of schizophrenia, was committed to a psychiatric facility. He was subsequently placed in the care of a foster family in the Bronx, New York. While an intelligent child, his social worker from the Foundling Hospital, a Miss Callaghan, thought him withdrawn and suspected that he was exhibiting the initial signs of an incipient schizophrenia. Chabasinski himself attributed this diagnosis to the then widespread opinion that mental illness was hereditary, and contended that the social worker supervising his foster home placement was "looking for symptoms".

In 1944, at six years of age, Chabasinski, then a shy and withdrawn child, was taken from his foster family and committed to the children's ward of the psychiatric division of the Bellevue Hospital in Manhattan, New York. While in this ward, known as Unit PQ6, he was brought under the care of the celebrated child psychiatrist Lauretta Bender, now deceased, who is the clinician commonly credited with founding the study of childhood schizophrenia in the United States. She formally diagnosed Chabasinski as suffering from schizophrenia. He was one of the first children ever to receive ECT, which was then given in its unmodified form without either anaesthetic or muscle relaxant. Despite the strenuous protests of his foster parents against the treatment, he underwent ECT under a regressive and experimental protocol where the treatment was given at a more intensive frequency than was the norm for shock therapy. Chabasinski received ECT daily for a period of about three weeks, comprising approximately twenty sessions of the procedure.

Recalling the experience, Chabasinski stated:

I was one of 300 children involved in an experimental program ... I remember being dragged down a hallway, thrown on a table and having a handkerchief stuffed in my mouth.

It made me want to die ... I remember that they would stick a rag in my mouth so I wouldn't bite through my tongue and that it took three attendants to hold me down. I knew that in the mornings that I didn't get any breakfast that I was going to get shock treatment.

I wanted to die but I didn't really know what death was. I knew that it was something terrible. Maybe I'll be so tired after the next shock treatment I won't get up, I won't ever get up, and I'll be dead. But I always got up. Something in me beyond my wishes made me put myself together again. I memorized my name, I taught myself to say my name. Teddy, Teddy, I'm Teddy ... I'm here, I'm here, in this room, in this hospital. And my mommy's gone ... I would cry and realize how dizzy I was. The world was spinning around me and coming back to it hurt too much. I want to go down, I want to go where the shock treatment is sending me. I want to stop fighting and die...and something made me live, and go on living. I had to remember never to let anyone near me again.

In 1947, Bender published on 98 children aged between four and eleven years old who had been treated in the previous five years with intensive courses of ECT. These children received ECT daily for a typical course of approximately twenty treatments. This formed part of an experimental trend amongst a cadre of psychiatrists to explore the therapeutic impact of intensive regimes of ECT, which is also known as either regressive ECT or annihilation therapy. In the 1950s Bender abandoned ECT as a therapeutic practice for the treatment of children. In the same decade the results of her published work on the use of ECT in children was discredited after a study showing that the condition of the children so treated had either not improved or deteriorated.

Commenting on his experience as part of Bender's therapeutic program Chabasinski said that, "It really made a mess of me ... I went from being a shy kid who read a lot to a terrified kid who cried all the time." Following his treatment, he spent ten years as an inmate of Rockland State Hospital, a psychiatric facility now known as the Rockland Psychiatric Center.

Chabasinski was discharged from the Rockland State Hospital at the age of seventeen. He eventually went to college where he qualified as a lawyer.

== Activism ==
Chabasinski had been active in the psychiatric survivors movement since 1971.

=== The Berkeley ban ===
Chabasinski was Chairman of the Coalition to Stop Electroshock which in 1982 qualified an initiative measure, titled Initiative T., for municipal ballot to make the application of electroconvulsive therapy a misdemeanour in Berkeley, California, punishable with a $500 fine or up to six months imprisonment. Chabasinski was the author of the ballot question and, along with fellow psychiatric survivor Leonard Roy Frank, he was a leader in the campaign. The campaign group, supported by human rights organisations such as the Berkeley-based ex-patient group Network Against Psychiatric Assault, consisted of some 250 people approximately half of whom were former psychiatric patients with the majority of the remainder consisting of students from Berkeley and individual doctors who were opposed to ECT. The coalition's entire campaign fund was in the region of $1,000. The American Psychiatric Association provided funds of $15,000 to campaign against the initiative. 2,500 people petitioned in support of the initiative exceeding the 1,400 signatures required to put the motion on the ballot.

At the time Chabasinski argued that the enforcement of the law governing consent to ECT in psychiatric facilities in the state of California was so lax that a total ban on the procedure was required. He and his fellow campaigners also claimed that ECT was a dangerous and barbaric treatment that could cause either long or short term memory loss, brain damage and that the procedure could even result in death. They also charged that when resident in a psychiatric institution the very concept of informed consent is meaningless.

During the campaign dozens of ex-psychiatric patients gave testimony against electroshock at a Berkeley City Council hearing. Protests were also held outside the Herrick Hospital, then the only facility in Berkeley where ECT was provided. In 1981 that facility administered ECT to 45 individuals. In order to collect and exceed the requisite number of signatures required to place Initiative T. on the ballot paper, members of the coalition campaigned outside supermarkets and went from door to door soliciting support.

The ballot was held on Tuesday 2 November 1982 and the measure passed with 25,380 voters, or 61.7 percent, supporting the ballot calling for a ban on ECT while 15,756 residents, or 38.2 percent, voted against the measure. Giving his perspective on why the measure had passed so resoundingly, Chabasinski stated that: "I think it's a very sympathetic issue ... Basically, they're going ahead and causing brain damage just to subdue people." Speculating on the possibility of extending the ban across the state of California and alluding to the wider aims behind the campaign he also said: "To be honest, this is one way of having a referendum on mental patients' rights and the way they are treated".

In response to the passage of the initiative the American Psychiatric Association asserted that plebiscite was not an appropriate means to arrive at a medical judgement on a complex issue. A spokesman for the association stated: "The voters have passed a law we believe is unnecessary, probably unconstitutional and ... dangerous ... We hope it will be overturned before doing harm by denying a seriously ill person access in Berkeley to treatment that could be lifesaving," One of the two doctors who administered ECT at Herrick Hospital, Dr. Martin Rubinstein, contended that the vote to ban the procedure reflected "pathological consumerism" and constituted "another case of the inmates trying to run the asylum". He further epitomised the ballot result as stemming from "an uninformed electorate [deliberating] on esoteric matters."

In June 1983 Donald McCullom, an Alameda County Superior Court Judge, issued an injunction on the implementation of the ban on ECT. Initiative T. was overturned shortly thereafter following a successful legal challenge initiated by the American Psychiatric Association, on the constitutionality of the measure.

=== Other roles ===
Chabasinski was a former directing attorney for Mental Health Consumer Concerns, (MHCC), and a former president of the board of Support Coalition International (SCI). He was also a board member of the successor organisation to the SCI, MindFreedom International for which he also acted as an attorney.

=== Eli Lilly and Zyprexa ===
In January 2007 Chabasinski acted as the attorney for the late psychiatric survivor activist and author Judi Chamberlin, the medical journalist and author of Mad in America and Anatomy of an Epidemic, Robert Whitaker, and the director of MindFreedom International David Oaks in opposing a motion by Eli Lilly to extend an injunction to conceal documents that revealed that the company had known for the previous decade of the potentially lethal effects of Zyprexa and had engaged in an illegal off-label marketing campaign.

== See also ==
- Electroconvulsive therapy
- Icarus Project
- Involuntary commitment
- Involuntary treatment
- List of psychiatric consumer/survivor/ex-patient related topics
- Mad Pride
- MindFreedom International
- National Empowerment Center
- Psychiatric survivors movement
- World Network of Users and Survivors of Psychiatry
- List of people who have undergone electroconvulsive therapy
