= Mad pride =

Movement encouraging pride in people with mental illnesses

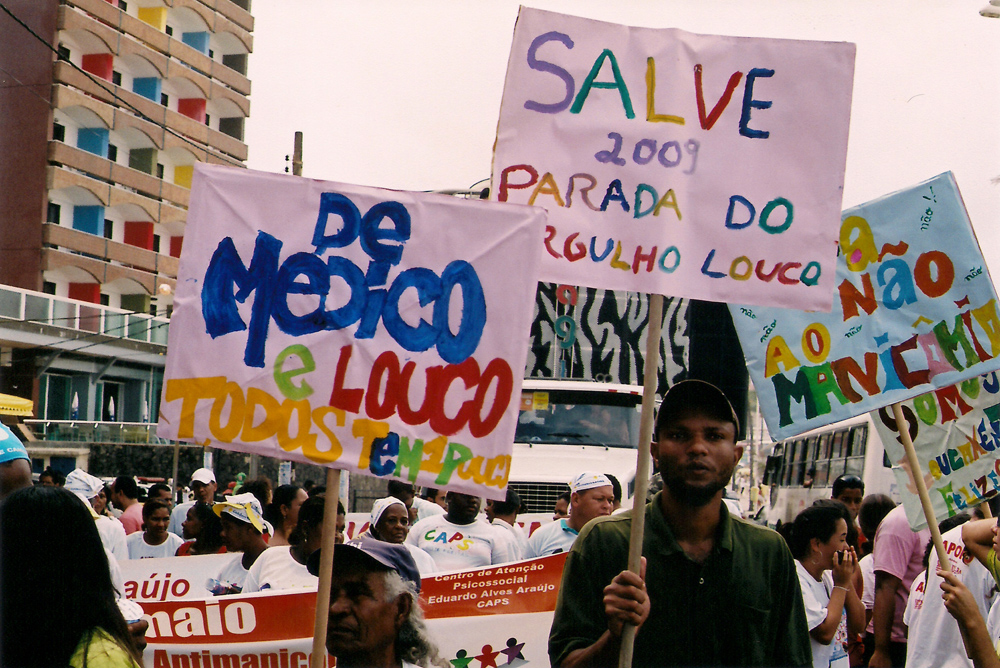
Mad Pride parade in Salvador, Brazil, in 2009.

Mad pride is a mass movement of current and former users of mental health services, as well as those who have never used mental health services but are aligned with the mad pride framework. The movement encourages individuals with mental illness to be proud of their 'Mad' identity. In recent years, Mad pride has increasingly aligned with the neurodiversity movement, recognizing the interconnected nature of mental health advocacy and neurodivergent experiences.

== Core principles ==
Mad pride activists seek to reclaim terms such as "mad", "nutter", crazy and "psycho" from misuse, such as in tabloid newspapers, and to transform them from negative to positive descriptors. Through mass media campaigns, mad pride activists seek to re-educate the general public on the causes of mental disorders and the experiences of those using the mental health system.

Mad pride was formed in 1993 in response to local community prejudices towards people with a psychiatric history living in boarding homes in the Parkdale area of Toronto, Ontario, Canada; since then, an event has been held in Toronto every year (except for 1996). A similar movement began around the same time in the United Kingdom, and by the late 1990s, mad pride events were organized around the globe, including in Australia, Brazil, France, Ireland, Portugal, Madagascar, South Africa, South Korea, and the United States. Events draw thousands of participants, according to MindFreedom International, a United States mental health advocacy organization that promotes and tracks events spawned by the movement.

== History ==
Mad studies grew out of Mad pride and the psychiatric survivor framework, and focuses on developing scholarly thinking around "mental health" by academics who self-identify as mad. As noted in Mad matters: a critical reader in Canadian mad studies, "Mad Studies can be defined in general terms as a project of inquiry, knowledge production, and political action devoted to the critique and transcendence of psy-centred ways of thinking, behaving, relating, and being".

The first known event, held on 18 September 1993, was called "Psychiatric Survivor Pride Day", and was organized by and for people who identified as survivors, consumers, or ex-patients of psychiatric practices.

=== Founders ===
Mad pride's founding activists in the UK included Simon Barnett, Mark Roberts, Pete Shaughnessy, and Robert Dellar.

=== Books and articles ===
On Our Own: Patient-Controlled Alternatives to the Mental Health System, published in 1978 by Judi Chamberlin, is a foundational text in the mad pride movement, although it was published before the movement was launched.

Mad pride was launched shortly before a book of the same name, Mad Pride: A celebration of mad culture, published in 2000. On May 11, 2008, Gabrielle Glaser documented mad pride in The New York Times. Glaser stated, "Just as gay-rights activists reclaimed the word queer as a badge of honor rather than a slur, these advocates proudly call themselves mad; they say their conditions do not preclude them from productive lives."

== Culture and events ==
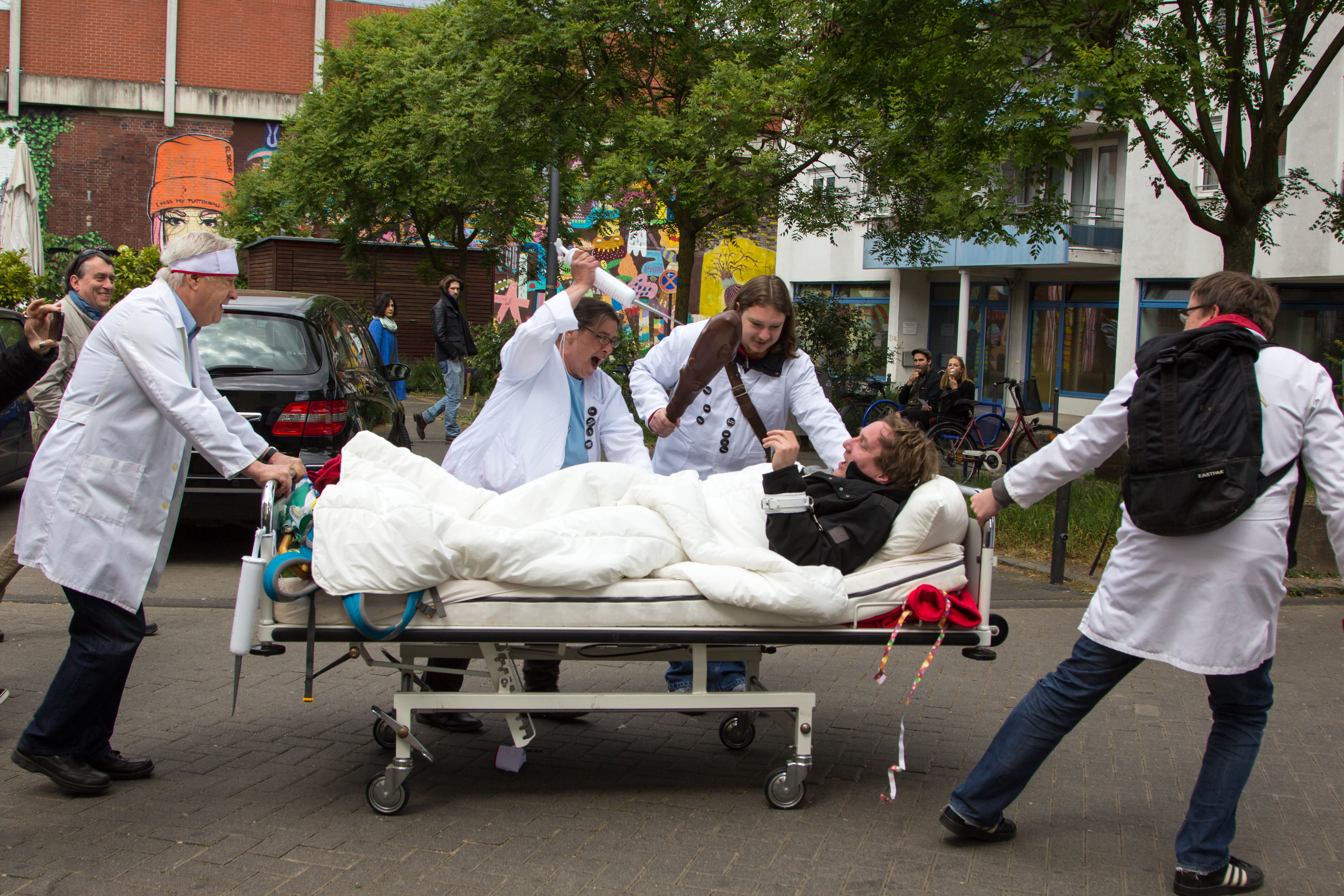
Bed Push at Mad Pride parade in Cologne, Germany 2016.

Mad pride and disability pride are both celebrated in July in many countries, including Canada, Ireland, and the United Kingdom. There is a connection to Bastille Day, a French national holiday which occurs annually on July 14 to commemorate the Storming of the Bastille on July 14, 1789. This event was adopted as a symbol of mad pride, representing liberation and freedom.

The mad pride movement has spawned recurring cultural events in Toronto, London, Dublin, and other cities around the world. These events often include live music, poetry readings, film screenings, and street theatre. "Bed push" protests are one form of street theatre unique to mad pride events; their aim is to raise awareness about the barriers that prevent people from accessing quality treatment – which disproportionately affect people who are oppressed for other aspects such as race or class – as well as the widespread use of force in psychiatric hospitals. Past events have included British journalist Jonathan Freedland and novelist Clare Allan. Mad pride cultural events take a variety of forms, such as the South London collective Creative Routes, the Chipmunka Publishing enterprise, and the many works of Dolly Sen.

=== Bed push ===
A flyer for a mad pride event in London, 2003. Featured performers include Pete Shaughnessy, Alternative TV, Nikki Sudden, The Fish Brothers, Ceramic Hobs, Melanie Clifford, and Caesar Reel.

A Bed Push is a method of activism employed by multiple mental health agencies and advocates as a method of raising awareness about psychiatric care. Activists wheel a gurney through public spaces to provoke discussion about mental health care. MindFreedom has a recipe for a successful Bed Push on their website, urging participants to remain peaceful but also ensure they are seen, using attention-grabbing tactics such as blowing horns, mild traffic disruptions, and loud music. Often patients in psychiatric care feel silenced and powerless, so the act of intentionally securing visibility and showing off resilience is one method of regaining dignity.

Mad Pride Week in Toronto is recognized by the city itself. The festivities surrounding this week are highlighted by the mad pride Bed Push, which typically takes place on the 14th of July. The event is staged at Toronto's Queen Street West "to raise public awareness about the use of force and lack of choice for people ensnared in the Ontario mental health system". This week is officially run by Toronto Mad Pride which partners a number of mental health agencies in the city. In recent years, some advocates have pushed for Parkdale, Toronto to be renamed MAD! Village, to reclaim pride in its surrounding communities' long history of struggle with mental health and addictions.

A series of bed push events take place around London each year.

=== Psychiatric Patient-Built Wall Tours ===
The Psychiatric Patient-Built Wall Tours took place in Toronto, at the CAMH facility on Queen St West, from 2000–2010. The tours showed the patient-built walls from the 19th century located at present day CAMH. The purpose of the tours was to give a history on the lives of the patients who built the walls, and bring attention to the harsh realities of psychiatry.

Geoffrey Reaume and Heinz Klein first came up with the idea of walking tours as part of a mad pride event in 2000. The first wall tour occurred on what is now known as Mad Pride Day, on July 14, 2000, with an attendance of about fifty people. Reaume led the tours, and they grew from annual events for mad pride, to occurring several times throughout the year in all non-winter months.

== See also ==
- Anti-psychiatry
- Autistic Pride Day
- Brazilian anti-asylum movement
- Clifford Whittingham Beers
- David Reville
- Disability rights movement
- Disability flag
- Elizabeth Packard
- Functional diversity
- Icarus Project
- Involuntary commitment
- Judi Chamberlin
- Kate Millett
- Leonard Roy Frank
- Linda Andre
- Lyn Duff
- Mentalism (discrimination)
- National Empowerment Center
- Neurodiversity
- Outline of the psychiatric survivors movement
- Psychiatric survivors movement
- Ted Chabasinski
- World Network of Users and Survivors of Psychiatry
