= Leonard Roy Frank =

American activist (1932–2015)

Leonard Roy Frank (July 15, 1932 – January 15, 2015) was an American human rights activist, psychiatric survivor, editor, writer, aphorist, and lecturer.

Frank lived in San Francisco from 1959 until his death, where he managed an art gallery before he began collecting quotations. It was Leonard Roy Frank who discovered notable artist G. Mark Mulleian in 1969 and displayed his work at the Frank gallery.

Frank graduated from the Wharton School of the University of Pennsylvania in 1954. He then served in the US Army and later sold real estate. In 1962, in San Francisco, Frank was committed to a psychiatric hospital for being 'paranoid schizophrenic' and given insulin shock therapy treatments and dozens of electroconvulsive therapy (ECT) treatments.

By 1972, Frank worked at Madness Network News. In December 1973, he and Wade Hudson founded Network Against Psychiatric Assault (NAPA), a patients' and survivors' advocacy group.

Of ECT, Frank wrote: "Over the last thirty-five years I have researched the various shock procedures, particularly electroshock or ECT, have spoken with hundreds of ECT survivors, and have corresponded with many others. From all these sources and my own experience, I have concluded that ECT is a brutal, dehumanizing, memory-destroying, intelligence lowering, brain-damaging, brainwashing, life-threatening technique."

Due to his years of anti-ECT testimony and activism, Linda Andre wrote in Doctors of Deception, "If Marilyn Rice was the Queen of Shock, Leonard Roy Frank was the King."

The author Peter Lehmann called Frank "one of the important people who helped to develop the theory and practice of French: humanistic antipsychiatry" and mentioned him in Lehmann's "Expression of Gratitude on the Occasion of the Award of an Honorary Doctoral Degree by the School of Psychology of the Aristotle University of Thessaloniki (Greece), September 28, 2010".

A published author, Frank compiled numerous books of quotes and passages, as well as writing about his own experiences.

== Published works ==
- The History of Shock Treatment (1978). ISBN 0-9601376-1-0
- Influencing Minds: A Reader in Quotations (1994). Feral House. ISBN 978-0-922915-25-5
- Electroschock (1996). In Peter Lehmann, Schöne neue Psychiatrie, Vol. 1: Wie Chemie und Strom auf Geist und Psyche wirken (pp. 287–319). Berlin: Antipsychiatrieverlag. ISBN 978-3-925931-09-3.
- Random House Webster's Quotationary (1998). Random House. ISBN 0-679-44850-0
- Random House Webster's Wit and Humor Quotationary (2003). Random House. ISBN 0-375-70931-2
- Freedom: Quotes and Passages from the World's Greatest Freethinkers (2003)
- Electroshock: The Case Against (2005). (With Robert F. Morgan, Peter Breggin, John Friedberg, Berton Roueche, Bertram Karon). IPI Publishing. ISBN 0-920702-82-1
- Wit: The Greatest Things Ever Said (2009). Random House
- Inspiration: The Greatest Things Ever Said (2009). Random House
- The Electroshock Quotationary
- Love Quotes: 300 Sayings and Poems.

== See also ==
- Electroconvulsive therapy
- Icarus Project
- Involuntary commitment
- Involuntary treatment
- Outline of the psychiatric survivors movement
- Mad Pride
- MindFreedom International
- National Empowerment Center
- Psychiatric survivors movement
- World Network of Users and Survivors of Psychiatry
- List of people who have undergone electroconvulsive therapy
