= List of people who have undergone electroconvulsive therapy =

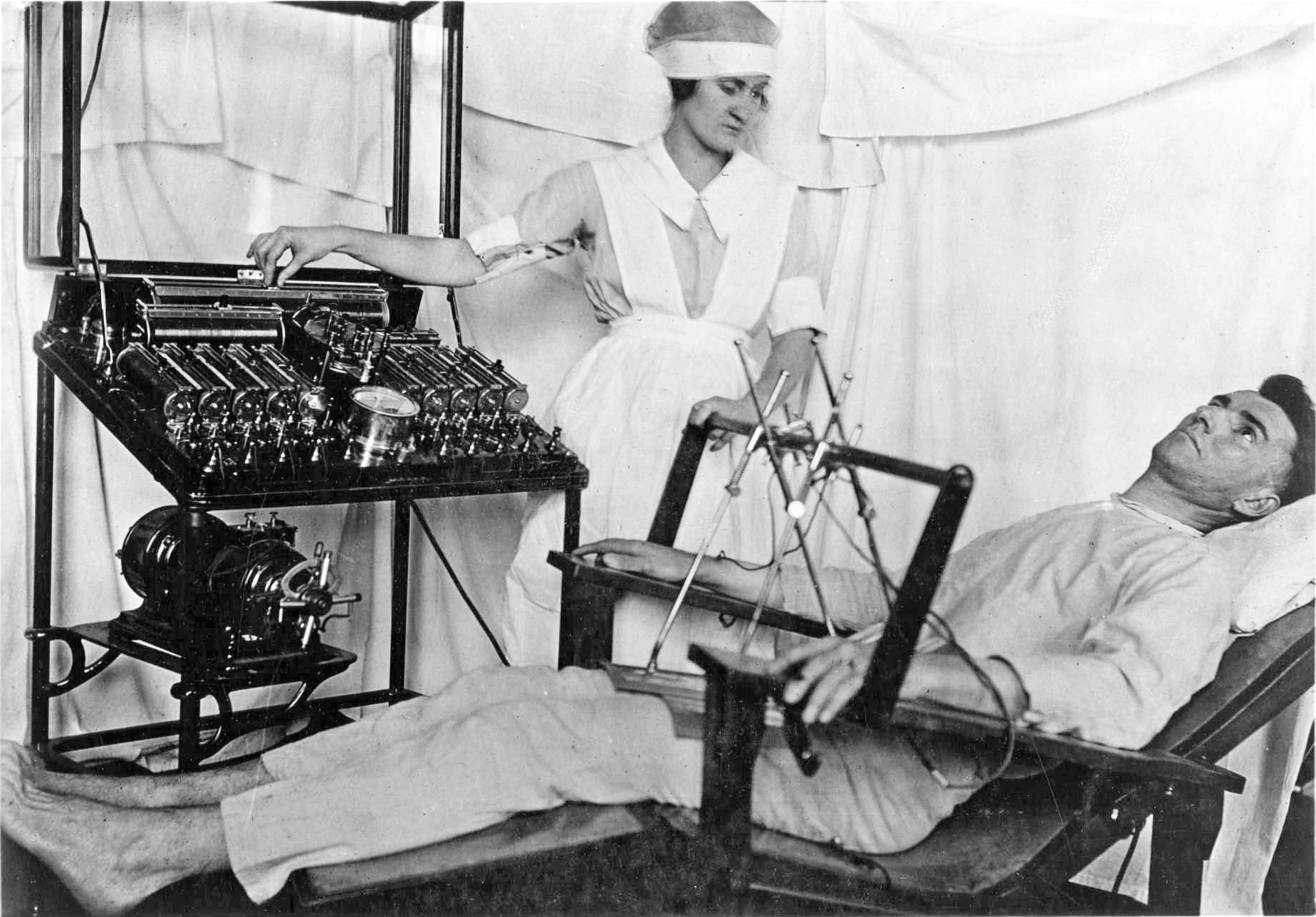
Use of electrical apparatus. Bergonic chair for giving general electric treatment for psychological effect in psycho-neurotic cases (World War I era)

This is a list of people treated with electroconvulsive therapy (ECT).

- Linda Andre, American author, activist, director of the Committee for Truth in Psychiatry (CTIP), and self-described psychiatric survivor.
- Louis Althusser, French marxist philosopher
- Antonin Artaud, French poet and playwright
- Dick Cavett, American television talk show host
- Ted Chabasinski, American attorney, activist, and self-described psychiatric survivor who received ECT at six years of age.
- Clementine Churchill, wife of Sir Winston Churchill
- Paulo Coelho, author of The Alchemist
- Simone D., a pseudonym for a psychiatric patient in the Creedmoor Psychiatric Center in New York, who in 2007 won a court ruling which set aside a two-year-old court order to give her electroshock treatment against her will
- Duplessis Orphans Orphans of the 1950s in the province of Quebec, Canada, endured electroshock.
- Kitty Dukakis, wife of former Massachusetts governor and 1988 Democratic presidential nominee Michael Dukakis and author of Shock, a book chronicling her experiences with ECT
- Thomas Eagleton, US senator and vice presidential candidate
- Eduard Einstein (28 July 1910 – 25 October 1965) Albert Einstein's second son had ECT. Hans Albert Einstein, his brother thought the psychiatric treatment made him worse.
- Roky Erickson, American singer, songwriter, harmonica player and guitarist
- Frances Farmer, American film actress, who described standing in line with other girls at mental hospital waiting for shock treatments in the 1940s.
- Carrie Fisher, American actress and novelist Fisher speaks at length of her experiences with ECT in her autobiography Wishful Drinking.
- Michael 'Tarzan' Fomenko (c.1930–2018), Australian bushman who lived outdoors for over 50 years.
- Janet Frame, New Zealand writer and poet
- Leonard Roy Frank, is a published author, human rights activist, and self-described psychiatric survivor.
- Judy Garland, Singer, dancer, actress.
- Harold Gimblett, British cricketer
- Julie Goodyear, English actress from Coronation Street.
- Gloria Grahame Actress. (1964)
- Peter Green, English blues guitarist, founding member of Fleetwood Mac.
- David Helfgott, Australian pianist
- Ernest Hemingway, American Pulitzer Prize–winning novelist, Nobel Laureate, short-story writer, and journalist
- Gloria Hemingway, daughter of Ernest Hemingway
- Marya Hornbacher, American writer
- Vladimir Horowitz, Russian-American classical pianist
- Vivien Leigh, English actress and second wife of Laurence Olivier
- Oscar Levant, American pianist, composer, television and film personality
- Shane MacGowan, Anglo-Irish singer and frontman of The Pogues
- Carmen Miranda, Luso-Brazilian Singer, dancer, actress
- Michael Moriarty, American actor
- Robbie Muir, Australian rules football player - when aged seven.
- Sherwin B. Nuland, American surgeon and writer
- Andrew Loog Oldham, manager of The Rolling Stones
- Karolina Olsson, the "Sleeping Beauty of Oknö"
- Sam Phillips, founder, Sun Records, discoverer of Elvis Presley
- Robert M. Pirsig, who later wrote about his experience in the autobiographical novel Zen and the Art of Motorcycle Maintenance.
- Sylvia Plath, American writer and poet
- Emil Post, American mathematician, died in 1954 of a heart attack following electroshock treatment for depression; he was 57.
- Bud Powell, American jazz musician
- Lou Reed, American singer-songwriter
- Marilyn Rice, anti-electroconvulsive therapy activist
- Paul Robeson, American bass singer and actor
- Yves Saint-Laurent, French fashion designer
- Peggy S. Salters, from South Carolina, in 2005 became the first survivor of electroshock treatment in the United States to win a jury verdict and a large money judgment ($635,177) in compensation for extensive permanent amnesia and cognitive disability caused by the procedure
- Edie Sedgwick, American socialite and Warhol superstar
- William Styron, American author
- Gene Tierney, American actress
- Townes van Zandt, American country singer-songwriter
- David Foster Wallace, American writer
- Mike Wallace, American journalist
- Tammy Wynette, American country singer and composer, who described having a series of shock treatments for depression in her biography.
- Emmanuel Carrère
