= Bonkersfest =

UK music festival

Coordinates: 51.475°N 0.093°W

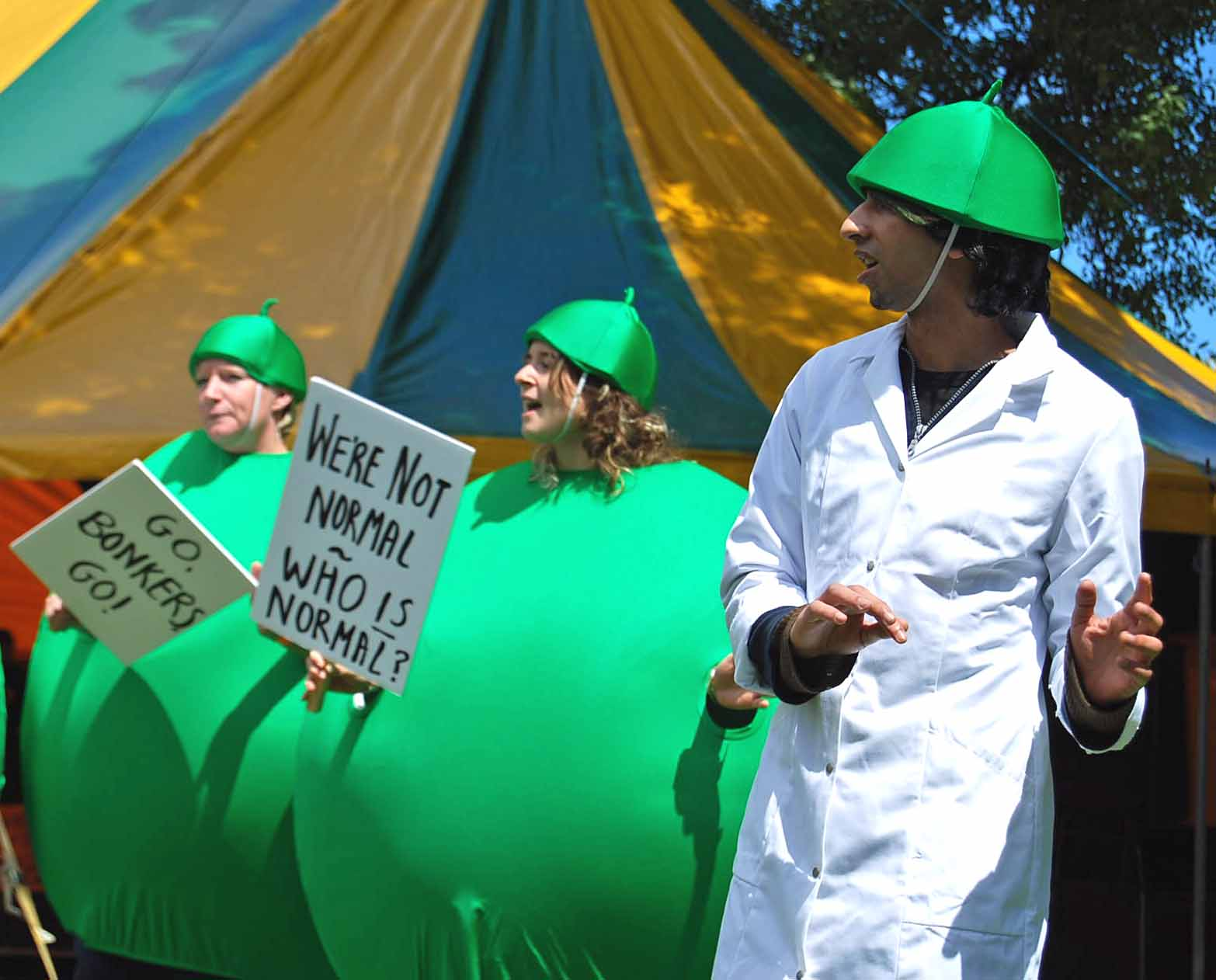
Performers at the 2008 festival

Bonkersfest was a free music and arts festival held in Camberwell, South London, which aimed to approach mental distress/health issues and people who are affected from them with positivity and creativity, to challenge stigma and exclusion, and to celebrate psychological diversity. It was created and led by the user/survivor/ex-patient organization Creative Routes.

The festival was first held in 2006, and again in June 2007, and July 2008. The venue of Camberwell Green was chosen because of the nearby Maudesley hospital, one of London's best known psychiatric institutions. The festival is organized by a group of arts and mental health organizations led by Creative Routes, and in 2006 was opened by the mayor of Southwark. Artists appearing at the 2007 festival included Lol Coxhill, John Hegley, and Steve Beresford.
