= Pete Shaughnessy =

English mental health activist (1962–2002)

Peter Anthony Shaughnessy (14 September 1962 – 15 December 2002) was a British mental health activist and one of the founders of Mad Pride, a group of mental health activists who reclaimed terms such as "mad" and "nutter" from misuse, and campaigned for the rights of the mentally ill.

Shaughnessy was born in South London in a working class Irish family. He studied drama at the Rose Bruford College, Sidcup, from 1983 to 1986. He then worked in a children's home and as a carer for people with disabilities, before becoming a bus driver in 1990 on London Buses route 36. In April 1992, coming to the aid of a conductor who was being assaulted, Shaughnessy was hit with an iron bar. Shortly afterwards he went on a silent hunger strike outside his bus garage in protest at the privatisation of the service, which was leading to more work for less pay. By the end of the year he was hospitalised. The diagnostic category applied was manic depression.

Shaughnessy organised a "Reclaim Bedlam" campaign in the late 1990s, initially to protest against anniversary celebrations of the Bethlem Hospital. They then protested the offices of the charity SANE and its head Marjorie Wallace who was campaigning for Compulsory Treatment Orders (outpatient commitment) – she changed tack following the adverse publicity. From there Shaughnessy started Mad Pride with fellow activists Robert Dellar, Simon Barnett and Mark Roberts. During 2000, with punk-style campaigns and humour, they helped prevent certain changes to the Mental Health Act. According to Ben Watson, "Shaughnessy's courage and humour and sheer bloody-mindedness shifted something. Permanently." According to Phil Barker, the UK's first Professor of Psychiatric Nursing Practice, "His campaigning and direct actions helped push the government on to the back foot over their plans for forced drug treatment for the mentally ill in the community. He fought against the stigma surrounding mental illness with passion, compassion and humour."

On 15 December 2002, Shaughnessy took his life by stepping in front of a train at Battersea Park railway station in London. His last known contact had been on 13 December at the NHS Acre day hospital in what was by then his home town of Worthing on the south coast. His obituary in The Big Issue (with which he had been involved) called him "a colossus in the mental health world". Clinical psychologist Rufus May praised him for having told the truth.

== See also ==
- Psychiatric User/Survivor Movement
