= Sanism =

Discrimination against people with mental conditions or impairments

Sanism, saneism, mentalism, or psychophobia refer to the discrimination against and oppression of people based on actual or perceived mental disorder or cognitive impairment. This discrimination and oppression are based on factors such as stereotypes about neurodiversity. Sanism impacts individuals who have learning disorders, attention deficit hyperactivity disorder, fetal alcohol spectrum disorder, bipolar disorder, schizophrenia, personality disorders, tics, or intellectual disability, are autistic, or experience other forms of cognitive impairment or neurodivergence.

Sanism may cause harm through a combination of social inequalities, insults, indignities, and overt discrimination. Examples include refusal of service and the denial of human rights.

Sanism does not only describe how individuals are treated by the general public. The concept also encapsulates how individuals are treated by mental health professionals, the legal system and other institutions.

The term "sanism" was coined by Morton Birnbaum, a physician, lawyer, and mental health advocate. Judi Chamberlin coined the term "mentalism" in a chapter of the book Women Look at Psychiatry.

== Definition ==
The terms "mentalism", from "mental", and "sanism", from "sane", have become established in some contexts, although concepts, such as social stigma, and, in some cases, ableism may be used in similar but not identical ways. While "mentalism" and "sanism" are used interchangeably, "sanism" is becoming predominant in certain circles, such as academics. Those who are mentally ill or identify as mad, along with their advocates, are directly targeted and discriminated against by sanism. The movement of sanism is an act of resistance by way of prejudice and oppression against those who are mentally ill or identify as mad, consumer survivors, and mental health advocates. In academia evidence of this movement can be found in the number of recent publications about sanism and social work practice.

== Etymologies ==
"Sanism" was coined by Morton Birnbaum.

The term "sanism" was coined by Morton Birnbaum during his work representing Edward Stephens, a mental health patient, in a legal case in the 1960s. Birnbaum was a physician, lawyer and mental health advocate who helped establish a constitutional right to treatment for psychiatric patients along with safeguards against involuntary commitment. Since first noticing the term in 1980, New York legal professor Michael L. Perlin subsequently continued its use.

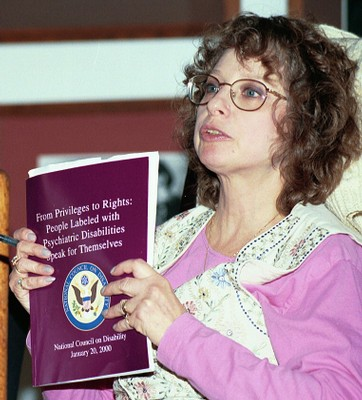
"Mentalism" was coined by Judi Chamberlin.

In 1975 Judi Chamberlin coined the term "mentalism" in a book chapter of Women Look at Psychiatry. The term became more widely known when she used it in 1978 in her book On Our Own: Patient Controlled Alternatives to the Mental Health System, which for some time became the standard text of the psychiatric survivor movement in the US. People began to recognize a pattern in how they were treated, a set of assumptions which most people seemed to hold about mental (ex-)patients regardless of whether they applied to any particular individual at any particular time – that they were incompetent, unable to do things for themselves, constantly in need of supervision and assistance, unpredictable, likely to be violent or irrational, etc. It was realized that not only did the general public express mentalist ideas, so did ex-patients, a form of internalized oppression.

As of 1998 these terms have been adopted by some consumers and survivors in the UK and the US, but had not gained general currency. This left a conceptual gap filled in part by the concept of 'stigma', but this has been criticized for focusing less on institutionalized discrimination with multiple causes, but on whether people perceive mental health issues as shameful or worse than they are. Despite its use, a body of literature demonstrated widespread discrimination across many spheres of life, including employment, parental rights, housing, immigration, insurance, health care and access to justice. However, the use of new "-isms" has also been questioned on the grounds that they can be perceived as divisive, out of date, or a form of undue political correctness. The same criticisms, in this view, may not apply so much to broader and more accepted terms like 'discrimination' or 'social exclusion'.

There is also the term ableism, referring to discrimination against those who are (perceived as) disabled. In terms of the brain, there is the movement for the recognition of neurodiversity. The term 'psychophobia' (from psyche and phobia; lit. irrational fear or aversion of the mind) has occasionally been used with a similar meaning.

== Social division ==
Sanism at one extreme can lead to a categorical dividing of people into an empowered group assumed to be normal, healthy, reliable, and capable, and a powerless group assumed to be sick, disabled, crazy, unpredictable, and violent. This divide can justify inconsiderate treatment of the latter group and expectations of poorer standards of living for them, for which they may be expected to express gratitude. Further discrimination may involve labeling some as "high functioning" and some as "low-functioning"; while this may enable the targeting of resources, in both categories human behaviors are recast in pathological terms. According to Coni Kalinowski (a psychiatrist at the University of Nevada and director of Mojave Community Services) and Pat Risser (a mental health consultant and self-described former recipient of mental health services).

The discrimination can be so fundamental and unquestioned that it can stop people truly empathizing (although they may think they are) or genuinely seeing the other point of view with respect. Some mental conditions can impair awareness and understanding in certain ways at certain times, but mentalist assumptions may lead others to erroneously believe that they necessarily understand the person's situation and needs better than they do themselves.

Reportedly even within the disability rights movement internationally, "there is a lot of sanism", and "disability organisations don't always 'get' mental health and don't want to be seen as mentally defective." Conversely, those coming from the mental health side may not view such conditions as disabilities in the same way.

Some national government-funded charities view the issue as primarily a matter of stigmatizing attitudes within the general public, perhaps due to people not having enough contact with those diagnosed with mental illness. One head of a schizophrenia charity has compared sanism to the way racism may be more prevalent when people do not spend time together throughout life. A psychologist who runs The Living Museum, facilitating art exhibitions by current or former psychiatric patients, has referred to the attitude of the general public as psychophobia.

== Clinical terminology ==
Sanism may be codified in clinical terminology in subtle ways, including in the basic diagnostic categories used by psychiatry (as in the DSM or ICD). There is some ongoing debate as to which terms and criteria may communicate contempt or inferiority, rather than facilitate real understanding of people and their issues.

Some oppose the entire process as labeling and some have responded to justifications for it – for example that it is necessary for clinical or administrative purposes. Others argue that most aspects could easily be expressed in a more accurate and less offensive manner.

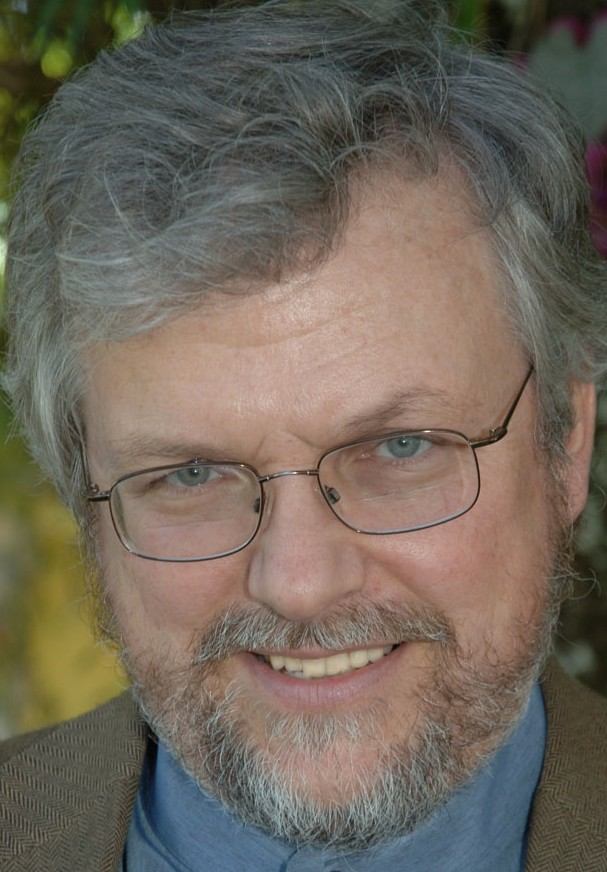
David Oaks, 2009

Some clinical terms may be used far beyond the usual narrowly defined meanings, in a way that can obscure the regular human and social context of people's experiences. For example, having a bad time may be assumed to be decompensation; incarceration or solitary confinement may be described as treatment regardless of benefit to the person; regular activities like listening to music, engaging in exercise or sporting activities, or being in a particular physical or social environment (milieu), may be referred to as therapy; all sorts of responses and behaviors may be assumed to be symptoms; core adverse effects of drugs may be termed side effects.

The former director of a US-based psychiatric survivors organization focused on rights and freedoms, David Oaks, has advocated the taking back of words like "mad", "lunatic", "crazy" or "bonkers". While acknowledging that some choose not to use such words in any sense, he questions whether medical terms like "mentally ill", "psychotic" or "clinically depressed" really are more helpful or indicative of seriousness than possible alternatives. Oaks says that for decades he has been exploring the depths of sanism and has not yet found an end, and suggests it may be the most pernicious 'ism' because people tend to define themselves by their rationality and their core feelings. One possible response is to critique conceptions of normality and the problems associated with normative functioning around the world, although in some ways that could also potentially constitute a form of sanism. After his 2012 accident breaking his neck and subsequent retirement, Oaks refers to himself as "PsychoQuad" on his personal blog.

British writer Clare Allen argues that even reclaimed slang terms such as "mad" are just not accurate. In addition, she sees the commonplace mis-use of concepts relating to mental health problems – including for example jokes about people hearing voices as if that automatically undermines their credibility – as equivalent to racist or sexist phrases that would be considered obviously discriminatory. She characterises such usage as indicating an underlying psychophobia and contempt.

== Blame ==
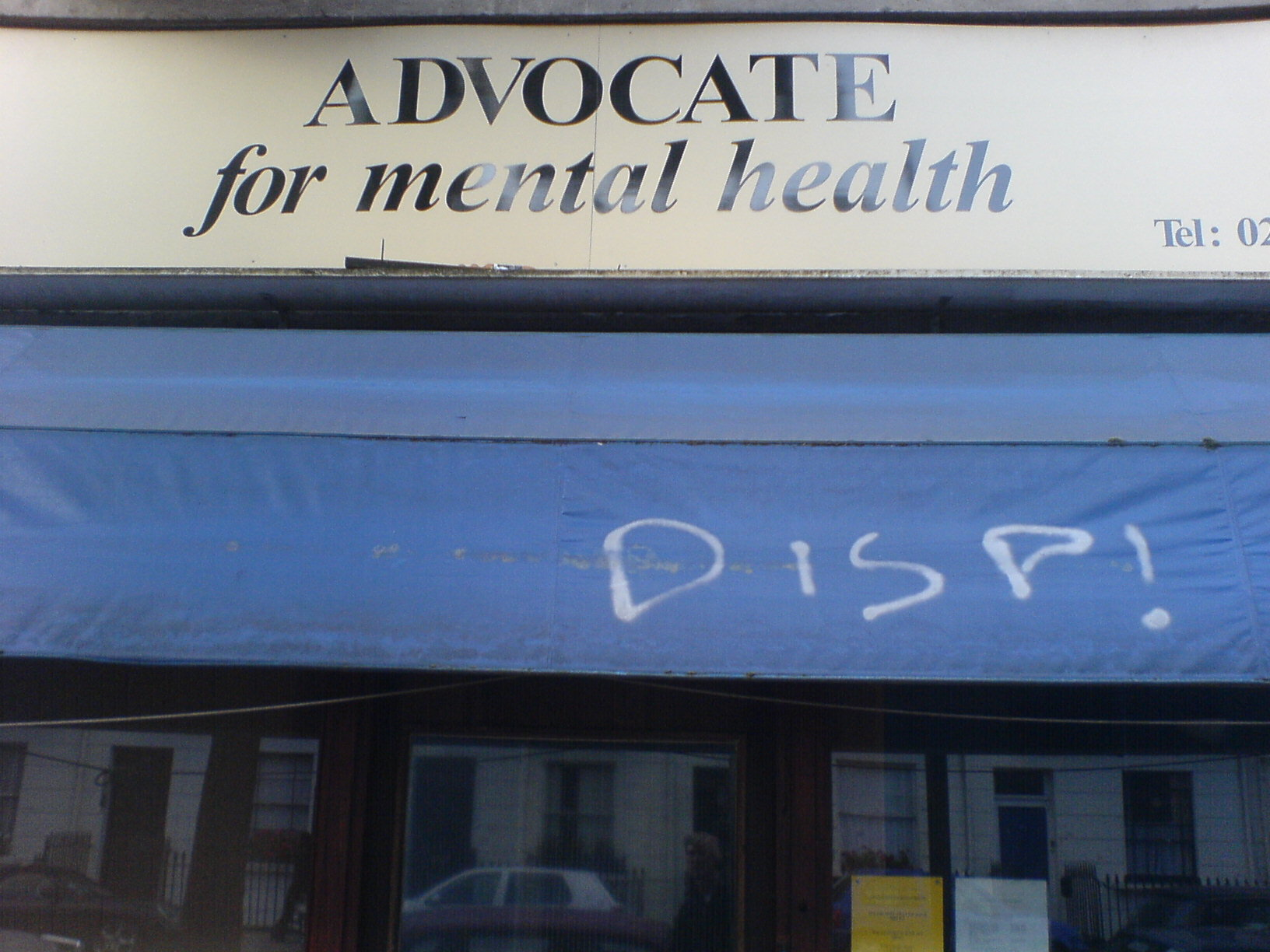
Graffiti on a mental health advocacy service

Interpretations of behaviors, and applications of treatments, may be done in a judgmental way because of an underlying sanism, according to critics of psychiatry. If a recipient of mental health services disagrees with treatment or diagnosis, or does not change, they may be labeled as non-compliant, uncooperative, or treatment-resistant. This is despite the fact that the issue may be the healthcare provider's inadequate understanding of the person or their problems, adverse medication effects, a poor match between the treatment and the person, stigma associated with the treatment, difficulty with access, cultural unacceptability, or many other issues.

Sanism may lead people to assume that someone is not aware of what they are doing and that there is no point trying to communicate with them, despite the fact that they may well have a level of awareness and desire to connect even if they are acting in a seemingly irrational or self-harming way. In addition, mental health professionals and others may tend to equate subduing a person with treatment; a quiet client who causes no community disturbance may be deemed improved no matter how miserable or incapacitated that person may feel as a result.

Clinicians may blame clients for not being sufficiently motivated to work on treatment goals or recovery, and as acting out when things are not agreed with or are found upsetting. But critics say that in the majority of cases this is actually due to the client having been treated in a disrespectful, judgmental, or dismissive manner. Nevertheless, such behavior may be justified by characterizing the client as demanding, angry or needing limits. To overcome this, it has been suggested that power-sharing should be cultivated and that when respectful communication breaks down, the first thing that needs to be asked is whether mentalist prejudices have been expressed.

== Neglect ==
Sanism has been linked to negligence in monitoring for adverse effects of medications (or other interventions), or to viewing such effects as more acceptable than they would be for others. This has been compared to instances of maltreatment based on racism. Sanism has also been linked to neglect in failing to check for, or fully respect, people's past experiences of abuse or other trauma.

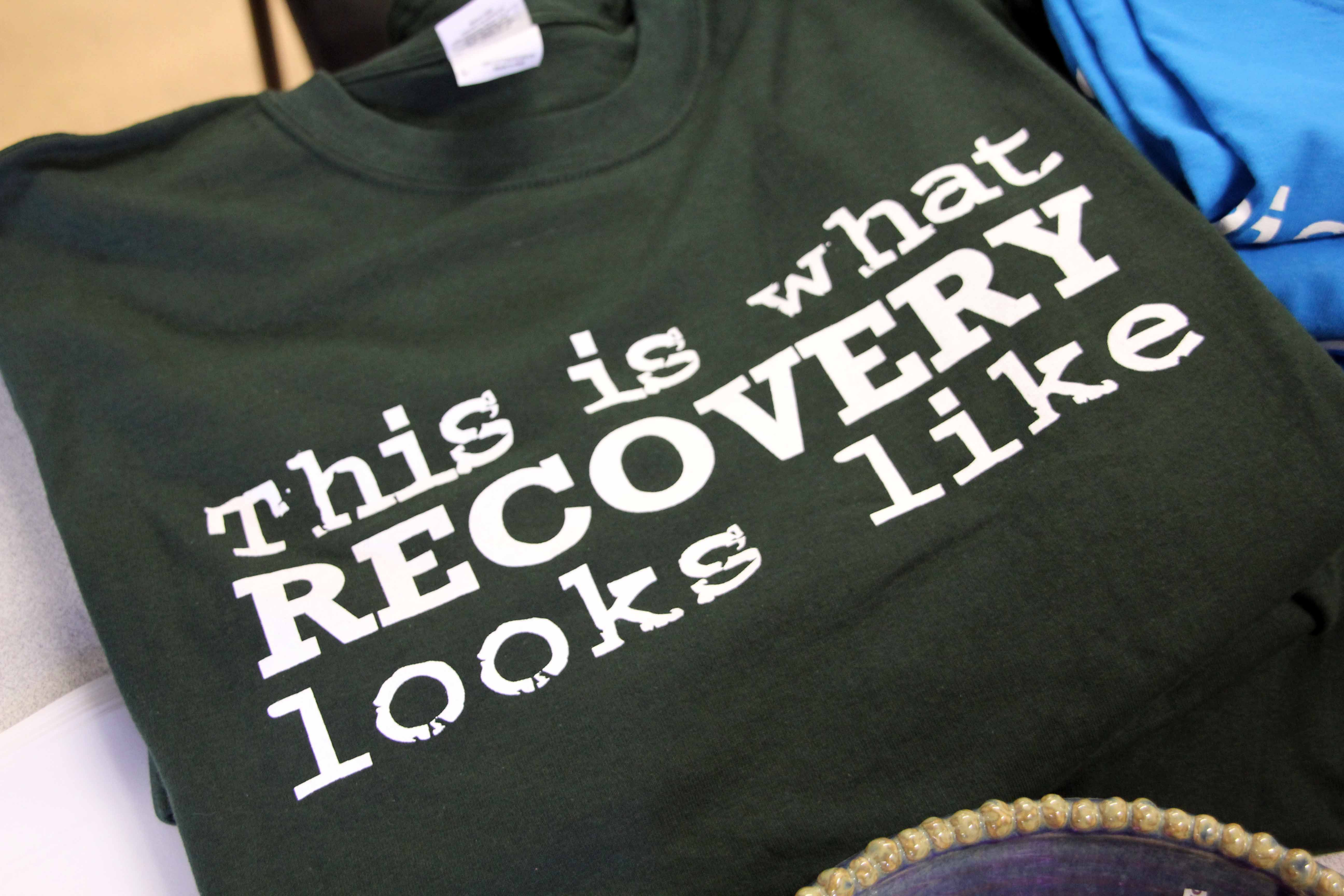
T-shirt intended to show the possibility and individuality of recovery

Treatments that do not support choice and self-determination may cause people to re-experience the helplessness, pain, despair, and rage that accompanied the trauma, and yet attempts to cope with this may be labeled as acting out, manipulation, or attention-seeking.

In addition, sanism can lead to "poor" or "guarded" predictions of the future for a person, which could be an overly pessimistic view skewed by a narrow clinical experience. It could also be made impervious to contrary evidence because those who succeed can be discounted as having been misdiagnosed or as not having a genuine form of a disorder – the no true Scotsman fallacy. While some mental health problems can involve very substantial disability and can be very difficult to overcome in society, predictions based on prejudice and stereotypes can be self-fulfilling because individuals pick up on a message that they have no real hope, and realistic hope is said to be a key foundation of recovery. At the same time, a trait or condition might be considered more a form of individual difference that society needs to include and adapt to, in which case a mentalist attitude might be associated with assumptions and prejudices about what constitutes normal society and who is deserving of adaptations, support, or consideration.

== Institutional discrimination ==
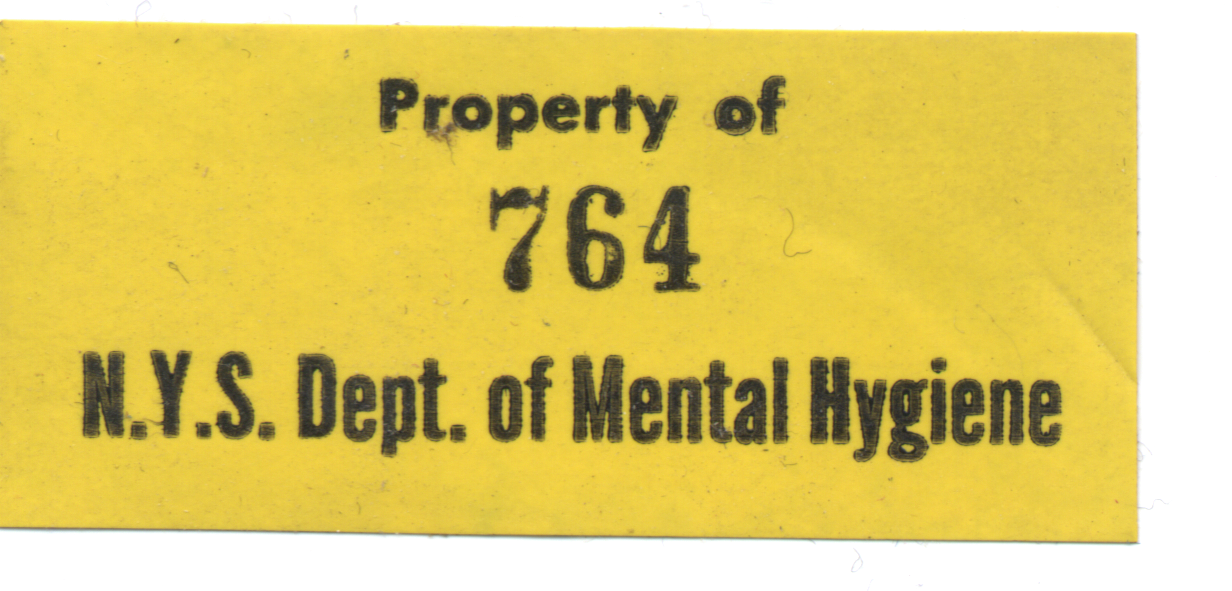
An institutional label

This may be apparent in physical separation, including separate facilities or accommodation, or in lower standards for some than others. Mental health professionals may find themselves drawn into systems based on bureaucratic and financial imperatives and social control, resulting in alienation from their original values, disappointment in "the system", and adoption of the cynical, mentalist beliefs that may pervade an organization. However, just as employees can be dismissed for disparaging sexual or ethnic remarks, it is argued that staff who are entrenched in negative stereotypes, attitudes, and beliefs about those labeled with mental disorders need to be removed from service organizations. A related theoretical approach, known as expressed emotion, has also focused on negative interpersonal dynamics relating to care givers, especially within families. However, the point is also made in such views that institutional and group environments can be challenging from all sides, and that clear boundaries and rights are required for everyone.

The mental health professions have themselves been criticized. While social work (also known as clinical social work) has appeared to have more potential than others to understand and assist those using services, and has talked a lot academically about anti-oppressive practice intended to support people facing various -isms, it has allegedly failed to address sanism to any significant degree. The field has been accused, by social work professionals with experience of using services themselves, of failing to help people identify and address what is oppressing them; of unduly deferring to psychiatric or biomedical conventions particularly in regard to those deemed most unwell; and of failing to address its own discriminatory practices, including its conflicts of interest in its official role aiding the social control of patients through involuntary commitment.

In the "user/survivor" movement in England, Pete Shaughnessy, a founder of mad pride, concluded that the National Health Service is "institutionally mentalist and has a lot of soul searching to do in the new Millennium", including addressing the prejudice of its office staff. He suggested that when prejudice is applied by the very professionals who aspire to eradicate it, it raises the question of whether it will ever be eradicated. Shaughnessy committed suicide in 2002.

The psychiatric survivors movement has been described as a feminist issue, because the problems it addresses are "important for all women because mentalism acts as a threat to all women" and "mentalism threatens women's families and children." A psychiatric survivor and professional has said that "Mentalism parallels sexism and racism in creating an oppressed underclass, in this case of people who have received psychiatric diagnosis and treatment". She reported that the most frequent complaint of psychiatric patients is that nobody listens, or only selectively in the course of trying to make a diagnosis.

On a society-wide level, sanism has been linked to people being kept in poverty as second-class citizens; to employment discrimination keeping people living on handouts; to interpersonal discrimination hindering relationships; to stereotypes promoted through the media spreading fears of unpredictability and dangerousness; and to people fearing to disclose or talk about their experiences.

== Law ==
With regard to legal protections against discrimination, sanism may only be covered under general frameworks such as the disability discrimination acts that are in force in some countries, and which require a person to say that they have a disability and to prove that they meet the criteria.

In terms of the legal system itself, the law is traditionally based on technical definitions of sanity and insanity, and so the term "sanism" may be used in response. The concept is well known in the US legal community, being referred to in nearly 300 law review articles between 1992 and 2013, though is less well known in the medical community.

Michael Perlin, Professor of Law at New York Law School, has defined sanism as "an irrational prejudice of the same quality and character as other irrational prejudices that cause and are reflected in prevailing social attitudes of racism, sexism, homophobia, and ethnic bigotry that permeates all aspects of mental disability law and affects all participants in the mental disability law system: litigants, fact finders, counsel, and expert and lay witnesses."

Perlin notes that sanism affects the theory and practice of law in largely invisible and socially acceptable ways, based mainly on "stereotype, myth, superstition, and deindividualization." He believes that its "corrosive effects have warped involuntary civil commitment law, institutional law, tort law, and all aspects of the criminal process (pretrial, trial and sentencing)." According to Perlin, judges are far from immune, tending to reflect sanist thinking that has deep roots within our culture. This results in judicial decisions based on stereotypes in all areas of civil and criminal law, expressed in biased language and showing contempt for mental health professionals. Moreover, courts are often impatient and attribute mental problems to "weak character or poor resolve".

Sanist attitudes are prevalent in the teaching of law students, both overtly and covertly, according to Perlin. He notes that this impacts on the skills at the heart of lawyering such as "interviewing, investigating, counseling and negotiating", and on every critical moment of clinical experience: "the initial interview, case preparation, case conferences, planning litigation (or negotiation) strategy, trial preparation, trial and appeal."

There is also widespread discrimination by jurors, who Perlin characterizes as demonstrating "irrational brutality, prejudice, hostility, and hatred" towards defendants where there is an insanity defense. Specific sanist myths include relying on popular images of craziness; an 'obsession' with claims that mental problems can be easily faked and experts duped; assuming an absolute link between mental illness and dangerousness; an 'incessant' confusion and mixing up of different legal tests of mental status; and assuming that defendants acquitted on insanity defenses are likely to be released quickly. Although there are claims that neuroimaging has some potential to help in this area, Perlin concludes that it is very difficult to weigh the truth or relevance of such results due to the many uncertainties and limitations, and as it may be either disregarded or over-hyped by scientists, lawyers or in the popular imagination. He believes "the key to an answer here is a consideration of sanism", because to a great extent it can "overwhelm all other evidence and all other issues in this conversation". He suggests that "only therapeutic jurisprudence has the potential power to 'strip the sanist facade'."

Perlin has suggested that the international Convention on the Rights of Persons with Disabilities is a revolutionary human rights document which has the potential to be the best tool to challenge sanist discrimination.

He has also addressed the topic of sanism as it affects which sexual freedoms or protections are afforded to psychiatric patients, especially in forensic facilities.

Sanism in the legal profession can affect many people in communities who at some point in their life struggle with some degree of mental health problems, according to Perlin. This may unjustly limit their ability to legally resolve issues in their communities such as: "contract problems, property problems, domestic relations problems, and trusts and estates problems."

Susan Fraser, a lawyer in Canada who specializes in advocating for vulnerable people, argues that sanism is based on fear of the unknown, reinforced by stereotypes that dehumanize individuals. She argues that this causes the legal system to fail to properly defend patients' rights to refuse potentially harmful medications; to investigate deaths in psychiatric hospitals and other institutions in an equal way to others; and to fail to properly listen to and respect the voices of mental health consumers and survivors.

== Education ==
Similar issues have been identified by Perlin in how children are dealt with in regard to learning disabilities, including in special education. In any area of law, he points out, two of the most common sanist myths are presuming that persons with mental disabilities are faking, or that such persons would not be disabled if they only tried harder. In this particular area, he concludes that labeled children are stereotyped in a process rife with racial, class and gender bias. Although intended to help some children, he contends that in reality it can be not merely a double-edged sword but a triple, quadruple or quintuple edged sword. The result of sanist prejudices and misconceptions, in the context of academic competition, is that "we are left with a system that is, in many important ways, stunningly incoherent".

== Oppression ==
A spiral of oppression experienced by some groups in society has been identified. Oppressions occur on the basis of perceived or actual differences (which may be related to broad group stereotypes such as racism, sexism, classism, ageism, homophobia, and others). This can have negative physical, social, economic and psychological effects on individuals, including emotional distress and what might be considered mental health problems. Then, society's response to such distress may be to treat it within a system of medical and social care rather than (also) understanding and challenging the oppressions that gave rise to it, thus reinforcing the problem with further oppressive attitudes and practices, which can lead to more distress, and so on in a vicious cycle. In addition, due to coming into contact with mental health services, people may become subject to the oppression of sanism, since society (and mental health services themselves) have such negative attitudes towards people with a psychiatric diagnosis, thus further perpetuating oppression and discrimination.

People suffering such oppression within society may be drawn to more radical political action, but sanist structures and attitudes have also been identified in activist communities. This includes cliques and social hierarchies that people with particular issues may find very difficult to break into or be valued by. There may also be individual rejection of people for strange behavior that is not considered culturally acceptable, or alternatively insensitivity to emotional states including suicidality, or denial that someone has issues if they appear to act normally.

== See also ==
- Franco Basaglia
- Disability flag
- List of disability-related terms with negative connotations
- Mental health stigma
- Mortality of autistic individuals
- Rankism (umbrella term for all forms of hierarchical discrimination)
- Social Darwinism
- Social model of disability
- Supremacism
- Violent behavior in autistic people
