= Marilyn Rice =

Marilyn Rice (died 1992) was an anti-electroconvulsive therapy (ECT) activist. She had been a bureaucrat with the Department of Commerce in the 1960s. In 1974 Berton Roueché published an article about her in the New Yorker titled "As Empty as Eve," naming her "Natalie Parker", and depicting her experience with ECT as erasing her memory. Rice had received ECT to treat severe depression. Rice filed the first lawsuit for ECT amnesia, but she did not win her case.

Rice founded the Committee for Truth in Psychiatry (CTIP) in 1984 to encourage the U.S. Food and Drug Administration (FDA) to regulate ECT machines.

Linda Andre wrote in Doctors of Deception, "If Marilyn Rice was the Queen of Shock, Leonard Roy Frank was the King."
