= Forensic Network =

The Forensic Network (the shortened name of the Forensic Mental Health Services Managed Care Network) is one of Scotland's Managed Clinical Networks. The Network was established in Scotland in September 2003 by the Scottish Government, in conjunction with "The Mental Health (Care and Treatment) (Scotland) Act 2003", and following a review of the State Hospital's Board for Scotland, 'The Right Place - The Right Time'.

The review stated that a Forensic Mental Health Services Network Managed Care Network should be established to address fragmentation across the Forensic Mental Health Estate, to overview the processes for determining the most effective care for mentally disordered offenders, consider wider issues surrounding patient pathways, and align strategic planning across Scotland.

== Activities ==
Under the auspices of NHS Scotland, the Network is multi-agency, multi-disciplinary and multi-regional, linked with Scottish Prison Service, Social Work Services, and Police, Criminal Justice agencies, the Scottish Government and Carers, amongst others. The Scottish Ministers invited Andreana Adamson, Chief Executive of the State Hospital, to lead on its development:

"The therapeutic aim of inpatient forensic services is to address violent, aggressive and offending behaviour. It is vital that patients are treated in accommodation appropriate to their needs in an environment that supports their rehabilitation."(Adamson, 2008)

The aim for the Forensic Network is to bring a pan-dimensional, whole Scotland approach to the planning and development of pathways for forensic mental health services. The Forensic Network host several professional groups, commission short life working groups to tackle specific concerns, and facilitate clinical fora on a variety of key topic areas. A regional approach is adopted in order to achieve the aims of addressing fragmentation across forensic mental health services. Representatives from NHS regions sit on an Advisory Board to provide guidance and input into national approaches.

The Forensic Network host the School of Forensic Mental Health (SoFMH) which was established in 2007 and provides colleagues across the Forensic Network with teaching, training and research support. It is a virtual school and has connections with many secondary education providers, providing short professional courses, academic courses and distance learning courses across Scotland. Its flagship programme suite is the New to Forensic (N2F) courses which have received international interest and commendation.
