= Pakistan Psychiatric Society =

Organization based in Pakistan

- Abbreviation: PPS
- Formation: 1972
- Founded at: Karachi
- Legal status: Professional association
- Headquarters: Karachi, Pakistan
- President: Imtiaz Ahmad Dogar
- President-elect: Ghulam Rasool
- Immediate past-president: M. Iqbal Afrid
- Secretary: Ali Ahsan Mufti
- Employees: 22 (2022)
- Website: ppspk.com

The Pakistan Psychiatric Society was founded in 1972 and registered in Karachi, Pakistan under the Societies Registration Act, 1860. The society is dedicated to providing care to psychiatric patients, and also the promulgation of mental health education. It publishes various journals and pamphlets, such as the Journal of Pakistan Psychiatric Society.

== Membership ==
The society is led by president Imtiaz Ahmad Dogar and a board of trustees with an executive committee. PPS reports that its membership is primarily for medical specialists who are qualified, or in the process of becoming qualified, as psychiatrists. Applicants for membership must also hold a valid medical license (with the exception of medical students and residents) and provide one reference who is an PPS member. PPS holds an annual conference attended by a Pakistani and international audience. PPS has organized different hospital tours for the betterment of mental health in Pakistan.

== Publications ==
PPS publishes several journals focused on different areas of psychiatry, for example, academic, clinical practice, or news.

=== Journal of Pakistan Psychiatric Society ===
Journal of Pakistan Psychiatric Society
- Discipline: Psychiatry
- Language: English
- Edited by: Muhammad Iqbal Afridi

Publication details
- Former name: Pakistan Journal of Clinical Psychiatry
- History: 2005-present
- Publisher: Pakistan Psychiatric Society (Pakistan)
- Frequency: Biannually
- Open access: Yes

Standard abbreviations
- ISO 4: J. Pak. Psychiatr. Soc.

Indexing
- ISSN: 2224-8897
- OCLC no.: 1127433902

Links
- Journal homepage

The Journal of Pakistan Psychiatric Society is a biannual peer-reviewed open access medical journal covering research in all fields of psychiatry. Each year, a supplement is published that contains the abstracts of presentations at the annual meeting of the society. The journal was established in 2005 as the Pakistan Journal of Clinical Psychiatry before obtaining its present name. The editor-in-chief is Muhammad Iqbal Afridi.
