= Judi Chamberlin =

American psychiatric survivors movement activist

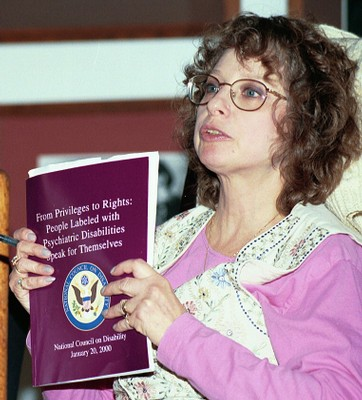
- Judi Chamberlin upon the publication of the National Council on Disability's federal report From Privileges to Rights
- Born: Judith Rosenberg; October 30, 1944; Brooklyn, New York, US
- Died: January 16, 2010 (aged 65); Arlington, Massachusetts, US
- Education: Midwood High School, Brooklyn
- Occupations: Director of Education National Empowerment Center; Co-chair WNUSP
- Years active: 1971–2010
- Known for: Internationally known psychiatric survivor movement activist and author
- Notable work: On Our Own: Patient Controlled Alternatives to the Mental Health System (1978); From Privileges to Rights (2000)
- Board member of: MindFreedom International
- Spouses: Robert Chamberlin (1964–1972); Ted Chabasinski (1972–1985); Howard Cahn (1988–2002)
- Partner: Martin Federman (2006–2011)
- Awards: Distinguished Service Award of the President of the United States
- Website: www.power2u.org/judi-tribute-book.html

Notes
- Ted Chabasinski and Judi Chamberlin divorced in 1985 so that he could marry his second wife. However, they separated as couple c. 1974. They remained close friends.

Judi Chamberlin (née Rosenberg; October 30, 1944 – January 16, 2010) was an American activist, leader, organizer, public speaker and educator in the psychiatric survivors movement. Her political activism followed her involuntary confinement in a psychiatric facility in the 1960s. She was the author of On Our Own: Patient-Controlled Alternatives to the Mental Health System, which is a foundational text in the Mad Pride movement.

== Early life ==
Judi Chamberlin was born Judith Rosenberg in Brooklyn in 1944 into a middle-class Jewish family. She was the only daughter of Harold and Shirley Jaffe Rosenberg. The family later changed their name to Ross. Her father was a factory worker when she was a child and later worked as an executive in the advertising industry. Her mother was employed as a school secretary. Chamberlin graduated from Midwood High School. After graduation, she had no plans of attending college and worked as a secretary instead.

== Psychiatric experience ==
There are real indignities and real problems when all facets of life are controlled—when to get up, to eat, to shower—and chemicals are put inside our bodies against our will.

— Judi Chamberlin, New York Times, 1981

In 1966, at the age of twenty-one and recently married, Chamberlin suffered a miscarriage and, according to her own account, became severely depressed. Following psychiatric advice, she voluntarily signed herself into a psychiatric facility as an in-patient. However, after several voluntary admissions she was diagnosed with schizophrenia and involuntarily committed to a psychiatric ward at Mt. Sinai Hospital in New York state for a period of five months.

As an involuntary patient, she witnessed and experienced a range of abuses. Seclusion rooms and refractory wards were used for resistive patients, even when their forms of resistance were non-violent. The psychiatric medication she was given made her feel tired and affected her memory. As an involuntary patient she was unable to leave the facility and became, she said, "a prisoner of the system". The derogation of her civil liberties that she experienced as an inmate provided the impetus for her activism as a member of the psychiatric survivor movement.

== Activism ==
Remember back in MPLF? You put up a sign on the office wall that said, 'End Psychiatric Oppression by Tuesday.' That's what I want. End psychiatric oppression by Tuesday.

— Judi Chamberlin, in conversation with David W. Oaks, October 2009

Following her discharge, Chamberlin became involved in the nascent psychiatric patients' rights movement. In 1971 she joined the Boston-based Mental Patients Liberation Front (MPLF), and she also became associated with the Center for Psychiatric Rehabilitation at Boston University . Her affiliation with this center facilitated her role in co-founding the Ruby Rogers Advocacy and Drop-in-Centers, which are self-help institutions staffed by former psychiatric patients. and was also a founder and later a Director of Education of the National Empowerment Center. The latter is also an ex-patient run organization that provides information, technical assistance, and support to users and survivors of the psychiatric system. Its mission statement declares its intent is to "carry a message of recovery, empowerment, hope and healing to people who have been labeled with mental illness".

She was also involved with the National Association for Rights Protection and Advocacy and was an influential leader in the Mad Pride movement.

Chamberlin met David Oaks in 1976, when he was the chief executive of MindFreedom International. They were both members of the Mental Patients Liberation Front. She later became a board member of MindFreedom International, an umbrella organization for approximately one hundred grass roots groups campaigning for the human rights of people labeled "mentally ill."

In 1978, her book On Our Own: Patient Controlled Alternatives to the Mental Health System was published. It became the standard text of the psychiatric survivor movement, and in it Chamberlain coined the word "mentalism." She used the word "mentalism" also in a book chapter in 1975.

She was a major contributor to the National Council on Disability's report From Privileges to Rights: People Labeled with Psychiatric Disabilities Speak for Themselves, which was published in 2000. The report argued that psychiatric patients should enjoy the same basic human rights as other citizens and that patient privileges contingent on good behavior within the psychiatric system, such as the ability to wear their own clothes, leave the confines of a psychiatric facility, or receive visitors, should instead be regarded as basic rights.

Chamberlin was elected as co-chair of the World Network of Users and Survivors of Psychiatry (WNUSP) at the launching conference and General Assembly in Vancouver, British Columbia, Canada in 2001, and served in this capacity until the next General Assembly in 2004. During this period she also served on the Panel of Experts advising the United Nations special rapporteur on disability, on behalf of WNUSP in its role as a Non-governmental organization, representing psychiatric survivors.

She appears in the 2011 disability rights documentary Lives Worth Living.

== Personal life ==
Her marriages to Robert Chamberlin, Ted Chabasinski, and Howard Cahn ended in divorce. Chamberlin met Chabasinski, also an early member of the psychiatric survivor movement, in 1971 at the initial meeting of the Mental Patients Liberation Project in New York City. From 2006 until her death, Chamberlin's partner was Martin Federman. She has one daughter, Julie Chamberlin, and three grandchildren, Edward, Kyle, and Vivian.

== Death ==
Chamberlin died from chronic lung disease at her home in Arlington, Massachusetts on January 16, 2010.

== Published works ==
- Chamberlin, Judi (1978). "Chapter Five: When People Go Crazy". On Our Own: Patient Controlled Alternatives to the Mental Health System. New York: Haworth Press. ISBN 080155523X. Archived from the original on 2016-03-07.
- Chamberlin, Judi (1990). "The Ex-Patients Movement: where we've been and where we're going'" (PDF). The Journal of Mind and Behaviour. 11 (3&4): 323–336. Archived from the original (PDF) on July 27, 2011.
- Chamberlin, Judi (1993). 'Erfahrungen und Zielsetzungen der nordamerikanischen Selbsthilfebewegung' (pp. 300–317). In: Kerstin Kempker / Peter Lehmann (Eds.), Statt Psychiatrie. Berlin: Antipsychiatrieverlag. ISBN 3-925931-07-4
- Chamberlin, Judi (1995). "Mental health: choice and dignity". The Magazine of the World Health Organization. 48 (5): 16–17.
- Chamberlin, Judi; Rogers, E. Sally; Ellison, Marsha Langer (1996). "Self-help programs: a description of their characteristics and their members" (PDF). Psychiatric Rehabilitation Journal. 19 (3): 33–34. doi:10.1037/h0101293. Archived from the original (PDF) on October 22, 2012.
- Chamberlin, Judi (1997). "A working definition of empowerment" (PDF). Psychiatric Rehabilitation Journal. 20 (4): 43–46. Archived from the original (PDF) on October 22, 2012.
- Rogers, E. Sally; Chamberlin, Judi; Ellison, Marsha Langer; Crean, Tim (1997). "A consumer-constructed scale to measure empowerment among users of mental health services". Psychiatric Services. 48 (8): 1042–1047. doi:10.1176/ps.48.8.1042. PMID 9255837.
- Chamberlin, Judi (1998). "Citizenship rights and psychiatric disability" (PDF). Psychiatric Rehabilitation Journal. 21 (4): 405–408. doi:10.1037/h0095282. Archived from the original (PDF) on October 22, 2012.
- Chamberlin, Judi (1998). "Confessions of a noncompliant patient" (PDF). Journal of Psychosocial Nursing and Mental Health Services. 36 (4): 49–52. doi:10.3928/0279-3695-19980401-17. Archived from the original (PDF) on October 22, 2012.
- Chamberlin, Judi (2004). Preface to: Peter Lehmann (ed.), Coming off Psychiatric Drugs: Successful withdrawal from neuroleptics, antidepressants, lithium, carbamazepine and tranquilizers (pp. 11–13). Berlin / Eugene / Shrewsbury: Peter Lehmann Publishing. ISBN 978-0-9545428-0-1 (UK), ISBN 978-0-9788399-0-1 (USA). E-Book in 2018.
- Chamberlin, Judi (2014). Πρόλογος. στο: Πέτερ Λέμαν & Άννα Εμμανουηλίδου (επιμ.), Βγαί νοντας από τα ψυχοφάρμακα – Εμπειρίες επιτυχημένης διακοπής νευροληπτικών, αντικαταθλιπτικών, σταθεροποιητών διάθεσης, Ριταλίν και ηρεμιστικών (σ. 16–21). 2η διορθωμένη και βελτιωμένη έκδοση. Θεσσαλονίκη: εκδ. Νησίδες. ISBN 978-960-8263-81-9.

== Awards ==
- 1992: Distinguished Service Award of the President of the United States, National Council on Disability
- 1992: David J. Vail National Advocacy Award, Mental Health Association of Minnesota
- 1995: N. Neal Pike Prize for Services to People with Disabilities, Boston University School of Law

== See also ==
- MindFreedom International
- Psychiatric survivors movement
- World Network of Users and Survivors of Psychiatry
- National Council on Disability
- National Empowerment Center
- Anti-psychiatry
- Psychiatric survivors movement
- Involuntary commitment
- Biopsychiatry controversy
- Involuntary treatment
