= National Council on Disability =

Government agency of the United States

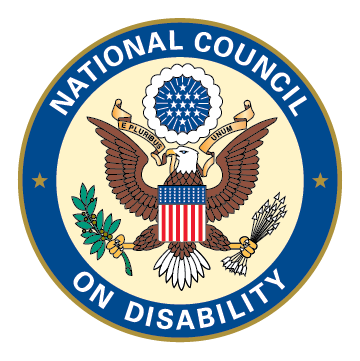

Agency overview
- Formed: 1984
- Jurisdiction: Disability Policy for the United States
- Employees: 20 (11 full-time staff and 9 Council members)
- Annual budget: $3,850,000 USD (FY2024)
- Agency executives: Neil Romano, Acting Chair; Ana Torres-Davis, Executive Director
- Parent department: Independent Federal Agency
- Website: https://www.ncd.gov/

The National Council on Disability (NCD) is an advisory agency on disability policy in the United States for all levels of government and for private sector entities.

NCD is an independent agency of the United States government headquartered in Washington, D.C. Its membership includes five presidential appointees, four congressional appointees, an executive director appointed by the chairperson, and a full-time professional staff.

== History ==
In 1978, NCD was created under the original name of the National Council on the Handicapped. It was set up as an advisory body to the Department of Health, Education, and Welfare by the Comprehensive Services and Disability Amendments Act of 1978 as an amendment to the Rehabilitation Act of 1973 (29 U.S.C. 780 et seq.).

NCD was transferred to the Department of Education by the Department of Education Organization Act of 1979, and later became an independent agency in 1984 through the Rehabilitation Act Amendments of 1984 (PL 98–22).

In 1986, NCD published "Toward Independence: An Assessment of Federal Laws and Programs Affecting Persons with Disabilities". NCD drafted the first version of the Americans with Disabilities Act (ADA) which was introduced in the US House and US Senate in 1988. The name of the agency was changed to the National Council on Disability through the Handicapped Programs Technical Amendment Act of 1988 (PL 100–630) on November 7, 1988.

Since enactment of the ADA, NCD has continued to shape the course of disability policy in the United States from within the federal government by advising the President, Congress and other federal agencies on current and emerging issues affecting the lives of people with disabilities.

== Authorizing statute ==
In 2014, the authorizing statute covering NCD was amended by the Workforce Innovation and Opportunity Act (P.L. 113–128). The Act reduced the NCD membership from 15 to nine and altered the composition from exclusively presidential appointees to a combination of presidential and congressional appointees.

The Senate Majority Leader and Minority Leader; and the Speaker of the House and the House Minority Leader each appoint one member of the council, and the other five members are presidential appointments. The President designates the chairperson from among the members appointed.

== Membership ==
Members of the NCD are individuals with disabilities, parents or guardians of individuals with disabilities, leaders on disability policy, or others who have substantial knowledge or expertise in disability policy, or other areas of interest that affect the quality of life and liberty of disabled Americans.

Appointees are representative of the broad range of Americans with disabilities, national organizations staffed by and/or working on behalf of people with disabilities, providers and administrators of services to disabled individuals, those conducting medical or scientific research related to disability, business concerns, and labor organizations. A majority of members of the National Council on Disability are disabled themselves. Appointees to the Council shall be broadly representative of other minority groups, communities or ethnicities.

as of August 1, 2024, current members include Neil Romano (Acting Chair), Hoskie Benally Jr., Sascha Bittner, Theo W. Braddy, Brian Patchett, Kimberly Hill Ridley, and Risa Jaz Rifkind.

== See also ==
- Title 34 of the Code of Federal Regulations
