= Against Therapy =

1988 book by Jeffrey Moussaieff Masson

- First edition
- Author: Jeffrey Moussaieff Masson
- Language: English
- Subject: Psychotherapy
- Publisher: Common Courage Press
- Publication date: 1988
- Publication place: United States
- Media type: Print (hard and paperback)
- Pages: 340
- ISBN: 1-56751-022-1

Against Therapy: Emotional Tyranny and the Myth of Psychological Healing is a 1988 book by author Jeffrey Moussaieff Masson, in which the author argues against the practice of psychotherapy. The work was criticized by reviewers.

== Summary ==
Masson argues that psychotherapy is a form of socially sanctioned abuse.

Masson argues that therapists ask patients to do more than is reasonably possible, they "distort another person's reality" to try to change people in ways that conform to the therapist's concepts and prejudices. Therapists are, in Masson's opinion, inevitably corrupted by power and "abuse of one form or another is built into the very fabric of psychotherapy". He gives an example of a therapist who used his "insensitivity, historical bewilderment, and general incomprehension" as "weapons with which he punish [a] woman for not viewing the universe the way he did".

He argues that therapists impose an internal understanding of people's problems, refusing to help a patient reach an external understanding of the world citing the example of psychiatry's failure to acknowledge the existence of sexual abuse of children.

Masson explores Carl Jung's relationship with the Nazi party and argues that the interpretation of dreams by therapists used by Jung could impose an interpretation of their wishes on an individual giving the example of a female patient whose dreams Jung interpreted as a secret desire to marry.

Of Rogerian psychotherapy, Masson argues that the theory is inconsistent because the therapeutic relationship prevents real connection and therefore the empathy that it claims is necessary for effective therapy, because the therapist is not in any way invested in the relationship. He points out that in his later work with committed patients diagnosed with schizophrenia, the patients were compelled to engage in therapy, which is at odds with the principles of client-centered voluntary exploration in therapy.

He concludes by arguing that therapy has a lack of interest in social injustice, that the training process can act as a form of social indoctrination arguing that psychiatry is fundamentally unreformable.

== Reception ==
Time wrote, "Although the author's slash-and-burn style of argument can be entertaining, readers should keep their hands on their wallets. Assertions tend to be sold as established facts." The New York Times argued that "Masson has failed to put a stake through the heart of therapy—in fact, he's greatly missed the mark." Psychiatric Times called Against Therapy "a 'battle cry' for the abolition of psychotherapy".
