= Liberation by Oppression =

2002 book by Thomas Szasz

Liberation by Oppression: A Comparative Study of Slavery and Psychiatry
- Author: Thomas Szasz
- Language: English
- Subject: Psychiatry
- Published: 2002
- Publication place: United States
- Media type: Print
- ISBN: 978-0-7658-0145-6

Liberation by Oppression: A Comparative Study of Slavery and Psychiatry is a 2002 critique of psychiatry by the psychiatrist Thomas Szasz.

== Summary ==
Szasz compares the justification of psychiatry with the justification of slavery in the United States, stating that both necessarily deny the subject's right to personhood. Szasz argues that modern psychiatry operates as an institution of coercion rather than care, asserting that involuntary commitment, enforced treatment, and compulsory diagnosis transform patients into de facto “psychiatric slaves.” He maintains that, just as slavery in history was justified by claims of supposed benevolence and social order, psychiatric practices are legitimized under the guise of treatment, a justification he deems morally and legally indefensible.

== Reception ==
Reviews on this book were published by Psychiatric Services, The British Journal of Psychiatry, Ethical Human Sciences and Services, and The Independent Review.
