= American Association for the Abolition of Involuntary Mental Hospitalization =

American advocacy organization (1970-1980)

- Formation: 1970
- Founder: Thomas Szasz, George Alexander, Erving Goffman
- Dissolved: 1980
- Type: Non-profit; NGO
- Headquarters: US, Syracuse, NY 1 3203 Roger Yanow, Sec.-Treas
- Fields: psychiatry
- Board chairman: Thomas Szasz
- Publication: The Abolitionist

The American Association for the Abolition of Involuntary Mental Hospitalization (AAAIMH) was an organization founded in 1970 by Thomas Szasz, George Alexander, and Erving Goffman for the purpose of abolishing involuntary psychiatric intervention, particularly involuntary commitment. The founding of the AAAIMH was announced by Szasz in 1971 on the American Journal of Public Health and American Journal of Psychiatry. In the Platform Statement of the association, one can read:

Throughout the entire history of psychiatry, involuntary psychiatric interventions, and especially involuntary mental hospitalization, have been regarded as morally and professionally legitimate procedures. No group of physicians, lawyers, or social scientists has ever rejected such interventions as contrary to elementary principles of dignity and liberty and hence as morally and professionally illegitimate. The AAAIMH does.

Board chairman of the association was Thomas Szasz. The association provided legal help to psychiatric patients and published a journal, The Abolitionist. The organisation was dissolved in 1980.

== See also ==
- Thomas Szasz
- Wrongful involuntary commitment
