= Lyn Duff =

American journalist and college professor (born 1976)

Lyn Duff, now principally known as Athena Kolbe, (born 1976) is an American journalist and college professor. Her career began in eighth grade with an underground school newspaper and has continued in various written and audio mediums. After being forced into anti-gay conversion therapy by her mother she escaped. She has done extensive reporting in Israel and Haiti. She speaks out for youth rights and criticizes certain mental health systems. She was affiliated with Flashpoints, an evening drive-time public affairs show heard daily on Pacifica Radio. She is now an assistant professor of social work at Barry University.

== Early years ==
Born in California in 1976, Duff began her journalistic career as the founder of an underground school newspaper, The Tiger Club, while an 8th grader at South Pasadena Junior High School in 1989. After five published issues, she was suspended from school by the principal for refusing to stop disseminating the newspaper.

After gaining help from the American Civil Liberties Union (ACLU), the South Pasadena Unified School District agreed to allow her to return to school. She completed her 8th grade year and was then accepted as an early entrance student to California State University, Los Angeles (CSULA), which she attended for a year and a half.

While at CSULA Duff was on staff of an alternative newspaper published by Los Angeles art critic Mat Gleason then a graduate student in the school of journalism.

== Involuntary conversion therapy ==
In 1991, Duff, then fourteen, came out publicly as lesbian.

Concerned about her daughter's sexual orientation, Duff's mother had her admitted to Rivendell Psychiatric Center (now called Copper Hills Youth Center) in West Jordan, Utah. Duff was admitted to Rivendell Psychiatric Center on December 19, 1991, at age 15.

During the drive from California to Utah, Duff covertly called journalist and friend Bruce Mirken who then wrote for both the LA Weekly and The Advocate. Although 30 years her senior, the two nevertheless had had plans to meet for dinner prior to her therapy stay, and upon hearing of her situation, Mirken phoned a public interest legal aid society that secured pro bono services of corporate attorney Gina M. Calabrese of the Los Angeles firm Adams, Duque & Hazeltine.

Although Rivendell was not affiliated with the Church of Jesus Christ of Latter-day Saints, Duff later said that she was visited by Mormon missionaries during her six months at the Utah psychiatric facility and that the treatment she received was heavily influenced by religion. Duff says that Rivendell therapists told her that a gay and lesbian orientation was caused by negative experiences with people of the opposite gender and that having a lesbian sexual identity would lead to sexually abusing other people or engaging in bestiality. Duff was diagnosed with Gender Identity Disorder (GID) and clinical depression. Duff was subjected to a regimen of conversion therapy. This involved aversion therapy, which consisted of being forced to watch same-sex pornography while smelling ammonia. She was also subjected to hypnosis, psychotropic drugs, solitary confinement, and therapeutic messages linking lesbian sex with "the pits of hell". Behavior modification techniques were also used, including requiring girls to wear dresses and harsh punishment for small infractions similar to hazing like having to cut the lawn with small scissors and scrubbing floors with a toothbrush, and "positive peer pressure" group sessions in which patients demeaned and belittled each other for both real and perceived inadequacies.

On May 19, 1992, after 168 days of treatment, Duff escaped from Rivendell and traveled to San Francisco, where she lived on the streets and in safe houses.

== Emancipation and adoption ==
In late 1992, with the help of Legal Services for Children and the National Center for Lesbian Rights, and with legal assistance provided by the National Center for Youth Law, Duff petitioned the courts to have her mother's parental rights terminated. She was one of a handful of children who divorced their parents that year. In October 1992, a lesbian couple in San Francisco adopted Duff. She lived with them until the age of eighteen, when she began living independently and returned to college.

== Youth rights activism ==
From 1992 through 1998, Duff was an outspoken critic of the mental health system, appearing on CNN, ABC's 20/20, and numerous print, radio and television media outlets. She also spoke at a number of human rights, civil rights, mental health and youth services conferences about her experiences and the rights of young people to live free of discrimination and oppression on the basis of their sexual orientation. During these years she also served on the board of several national organizations including the National Center for Youth Law (board member 1994–2001) and the National Child Rights Alliance (board member 1992–1993, board chairperson 1994–1999). In 1996, Duff was honored as a keynote speaker and given a human rights award at the international conference of the Metropolitan Community Church.

During these same years, Duff was emerging as a journalist in her own right, writing for Youth Outlook, a column in The San Francisco Examiner, and Pacific News Service. She joined the staff of Flashpoints, a daily hour-long drive-time show broadcast on Pacifica Radio's KPFA in 1994. Her writings have appeared in the San Francisco Chronicle, The San Francisco Examiner, Salon, Utne Reader, Sassy, The Washington Post, Seventeen, the Miami Herald and the National Catholic Reporter.

In 1995, Duff traveled to Haiti, where she established Radyo Timoun ("Children's Radio"), that country's first radio station run entirely by children under the age of seventeen. She reportedly worked closely with Haitian President Jean Bertrand Aristide.

In 1998, Duff graduated with a BA in international affairs and labor law from Skidmore College in Saratoga Springs, New York.

== International journalism ==
By the late 1990s, Duff was a well-established international journalist with postings in Haiti, Israel, Croatia, several African countries, and Vietnam. After the United States invaded Afghanistan, she traveled to the front lines as one of the few non-embedded Western journalists.

In early 2000, she began to cover religious affairs from her posting in Jerusalem, writing widely on the problems and conflicts between Christians, Jews, and Muslims. In 2002, Duff earned an MA in Theology.

In February 2004, Duff, who was then living six months out of every year in Jerusalem, was home in the United States on a brief visit when a group of ex-soldiers overthrew the democratically elected government of Haiti. She quickly traveled to Haiti, arriving in Port-au-Prince when the coup was only days old and reporting on the situation extensively for several national media outlets.

During 2004–2006, Duff regularly covered the situation in Haiti for San Francisco Bay View, Pacifica Radio's Flashpoints, and Pacific News Service. Her reporting is a blend of in-depth investigative reports and "as told to" first person commentaries by Haitian nationals.

== Academic career ==
In her academic career, she has used the name Athena Kolbe. Kolbe earned a master's degree in social work at Wayne State University in Detroit, Michigan in 2006. While at Wayne State Kolbe worked with her advisor Royce Hutson on a study of violence in Haiti. A 2 September 2006 article Kolbe and Hutson wrote for The Lancet, "Human rights abuse and other criminal violations in Port-au-Prince, Haiti: a random survey of households", based on the study faced criticism for being too supportive of president Jean-Bertrand Aristide and also for citing two articles written by Duff without disclosing that Duff and Kolbe were the same person.

Kolbe earned a PhD from the University of Michigan at Ann Arbor in 2015; her dissertation was titled "Reintegrating members of armed groups into Haitian society: An evaluation of three approaches". She has taught at Barry University since 2022.
