= World Network of Users and Survivors of Psychiatry =

World Network of Users and Survivors of Psychiatry (WNUSP)
- Abbreviation: WNUSP
- Formation: 1970s
- Founder: Individuals who identify themselves as having experienced human rights violations in the mental health system
- Type: International organisation
- Legal status: Active
- Purpose: To protect and develop the human rights, disability rights, dignity and self-determination of those labeled 'mentally ill'
- Headquarters: Odense, Denmark (2000- )
- Location: Odense, Denmark
- Origins: Psychiatric survivors movement
- Region served: International
- Methods: Advocacy, education
- Fields: Mental health, Human rights, Disability rights
- Members: Over 70 national organizations from 30 countries (as of 2003) (2003)
- Official language: English
- Co-Chairperson: Salam Gómez
- Co-Chairperson: Jolijn Santegoeds
- Current International Representative: Tina Minkowitz
- Key people: Tina Minkowitz (Current International Representative)
- Award: Special consultative status with the United Nations (2007)
- Formerly called: World Federation of Psychiatric Users (1991-1997)

The World Network of Users and Survivors of Psychiatry (WNUSP) is an international organisation representing, and led by what it terms "survivors of psychiatry". As of 2003, over 70 national organizations were members of WNUSP, based in 30 countries. The network seeks to protect and develop the human rights, disability rights, dignity and self-determination of those labeled 'mentally ill'.

== Activities ==
WNUSP has special consultative status with the United Nations. It contributed to the development of the UN's Convention on the Rights of Persons with Disabilities. WNUSP has produced a manual to help people use it entitled "Implementation Manual for the United Nations Convention on the Rights of Persons with Disabilities", edited by Myra Kovary.

WNUSP joined with other organizations to create the International Disability Caucus, which jointly represented organizations of people with disabilities and allies during the CRPD negotiations. WNUSP was part of the steering committee of the IDC, which maintained a principle of respecting the leadership of diverse constituencies on issues affecting them, and also maintained that the convention should be of equal value to all persons with disabilities irrespective of the type of disability or geographical location. Tina Minkowitz, WNUSP's representative on the IDC steering committee, coordinated the IDC's work on key articles of the CRPD, including those on legal capacity, liberty, torture and ill-treatment and integrity of the person. Since the adoption and entry into force of the CRPD, WNUSP has worked with other organizations in the International Disability Alliance and its CRPD Forum to guide the interpretation and application of the CRPD on these issues.

In 2007 at a Conference held in Dresden on "Coercive Treatment in Psychiatry: A Comprehensive Review", the president and other leaders of the World Psychiatric Association met, following a formal request from the World Health Organization, with several representatives from the user/survivor movement, including Judi Chamberlin (Co-chair of WNUSP), Mary Nettle and Peter Lehmann (Ex-chairs of the European Network of [Ex-] Users and Survivors of Psychiatry), Dorothea Buck (Honorary Chair of the German Federal Organisation of Users and Survivors of Psychiatry, and David Oaks (Director of MindFreedom International).

Salam Gómez and Jolijn Santegoeds are the current Co-Chairpersons of WNUSP.

Current International Representative and former co-chair of WNUSP is Tina Minkowitz, an international advocate and lawyer. She represented WNUSP in the Working Group convened by the UN to produce a draft text of the Convention on the Rights of Persons with Disabilities and contributed to a UN seminar on torture and persons with disabilities that resulted in an important report on the issue by Special Rapporteur on Torture Manfred Nowak in 2008.

== History ==
Since the 1970s, the psychiatric survivors movement has grown from a few scattered self-help groups to a worldwide network engaged in protecting civil rights and facilitation of efforts to provide housing, employment, public education, research, socialisation and advocacy programmes. The term 'psychiatric survivor' is used by individuals who identify themselves as having experienced human rights violations in the mental health system. WNUSP was established to further promote this movement and to respond on an international level to the oppression survivors continue to experience.

After initially meeting, in 1991, as the World Federation of Psychiatric Users at the biennial World Federation for Mental Health conference in Mexico, the network's name was changed to WNUSP in 1997. In 2000, the WNUSP Secretariat was established in Odense, Denmark. In 2001, the network held its First General Assembly in Vancouver, British Columbia, with 34 groups from twelve countries represented, and adopted its governing statutes.

In 2004, the network held its Second General Assembly in Vejle, Denmark with 150 participants from 50 countries attending.

In 2007 WNUSP received ECOSOC special consultative status at the United Nations.

In 2009, WNUSP held its third General Assembly in Kampala, Uganda. It adopted the Kampala Declaration stating its positions on the CRPD, which was later expanded into a longer version adopted by consensus of the board and the participants in the Kampala GA.

== ENUSP ==
The European Network of (Ex-) Users and Survivors of Psychiatry is the most important European NGO of (ex-) users and survivors. Forty-two representatives from 16 European countries met at a conference to found it in the Netherlands in October 1991. Every 2 years, delegates from the ENUSP members in more than 40 European countries meet at a conference where the policies for the coming period are set out. All delegates are (ex-)users and survivors of psychiatry. ENUSP is officially involved in consultations on mental health plans and policies of the European Union, World Health Organization and other important bodies. Initial funding came from the Dutch government and from the European Commission but has since proved more difficult to secure. ENUSP is involved in commenting and debating declarations, position papers, policy guidelines of the EU, UN, WHO and other important bodies.

== See also ==
- Anti-psychiatry
- Icarus Project
- Involuntary commitment
- MindFreedom International
- Community Alliance for the Ethical Treatment of Youth
- EUFAMI
- Judi Chamberlin
- Peter Lehmann
