= National Empowerment Center =

The National Empowerment Center (NEC) is an advocacy and peer-support organization in the United States that promotes an empowerment-based recovery model of mental disorders. It is run by consumers/survivors/ex-patients "in recovery" and is located in Lawrence, Massachusetts in Essex County.

== History ==
The self-stated mission of NEC is to carry a message of recovery, empowerment, hope and healing to people who have been labeled with mental illness diagnosis. It argues that recovery and empowerment are not the privilege of a few but a process that is possible for everyone to embark on and find help with. Although unconventional to those accustomed only to a narrow medical model, the model is part of a recovery movement that comprises an emerging consensus.

NEC and other groups are working to implement the transformation to a recovery-based system recommended by the New Freedom Commission on Mental Health. It operates a toll-free information and referral line. It organizes and speaks at conferences. Its staff have published in professional journals, scholastic books, popular press and alternative publications. NEC has "been involved" in many national boards and committees and in policy consultations at the White House, in Congress, in federal agencies such as HUD, the Social Security Administration, HCFA, the Joint Commission on Hospital Accreditation, and The President's Commission on Disability, and at the regional and local level with organizations such as HMOs and state divisions of mental health programs. It has developed educational, training and self-help resources. NEC staff have been featured by CNN, USA Today, The Boston Globe, National Public Radio and talk and radio shows in the U.S., Canada, Europe and other countries.

NEC conducted qualitative research with people who were severely mentally ill but have met criteria for recovery, from which ten major principles of how people recover were extracted:

- Trusting Oneself and Others
- Valuing Self-Determination
- Believing You'll Recover and Having Hope
- Believing in the Person's Full Potential
- Connecting at a Human, Deeply Emotional Level
- Appreciating That People Are Always Making Meaning
- Having a Voice of One's Own
- Validating All Feelings and Thoughts
- Following Meaningful Dreams
- Relating With Dignity and Respect
- Healing From Emotional Distress
- Transformation From Severe Emotional Distress
- Recovery From Mental Illness

NEC research also identified characteristics distinguishing those in illness and those "in recovery":

- Dependent vs self-determining
- Mental health system support vs Network of friends support
- Identify solely as consumer or mental patient vs identify as worker, parent, student or other role
- Medication essential vs one tool that may be chosen
- Strong emotions treated as symptoms by professionals vs worked through and communicated with peers
- Global Assessment of Functioning (GAF) score of 60 or below and untrained person would describe labeled person as sick vs score of 61 or above and untrained person would describe the recovered person as not sick (normal)
- Weak sense of self defined by authority and little future direction vs strong self defined from within and peers, strong sense of purpose and future

NEC developed an approach termed Personal Assistance in Community Existence (PACE). It is based on the premise that people can potentially recover fully from even the most severe forms of mental illness, and on an Empowerment Model of Recovery and prevention. It is an education program to help shift the culture of mental health from institutional thinking to recovery thinking, designed for people training to become peer coaches, people furthering their recovery, and people learning new skills to help others. It has previously been deliberately contrasted with "PACT" - Program of Assertive Community Treatment - a form of outpatient commitment that was originally designed to enable people to live in the community, rather than in psychiatric hospitals, but according to NEC has become a "coercive, lifelong, and nonclient-directed system with medication compliance as its most important tenet" NEC conducted a national survey of the use of PACE in the mental health system.

NEC co-founder Patricia Deegan was featured on the award-winning radio show a "This American Life"in "Edge of Sanity," first aired on 1997. Deegan herself is a psychologist who became highly successful despite multiple psychiatric hospitalizations. She was diagnosed as having schizophrenia as a teenager.

=== Founders ===
The co-founder and executive director is Daniel B. Fisher, now a board-certified psychiatrist. A graduate of Princeton University, he completed a PhD in biochemistry at the University of Wisconsin, medical training at George Washington University, and a psychiatric residency at Harvard Medical School. While working as a biomedical researcher at the National Institute of Mental Health before he was a psychiatrist, Fisher had a psychotic episode including hallucinations and delusions. After three months at Bethesda Naval Hospital at age 25, which included forced seclusion and antipsychotic haloperidol, he was discharged with a diagnosis of schizophrenia. He was involuntarily hospitalized three times. He reports being influenced by those who were able to show they cared about the person inside and gave him hope that he might some day recover. He went on to become a psychiatrist. He was told during psychiatric training that "You can’t talk to an illness" but believed that talking to the person inside is a key method for building trust and recovery. He has since worked as a psychiatrist in hospitals and clinics, while also being a part of the consumer movement. He said that a very significant part of the reason for becoming a psychiatrist was wanting to bring to the field what he wished had been there when he was going through psychosis He was a member of the White House Commission on Mental Health, 2002-03.

Laurie Ahern and Patricia Deegan were the co-founders and directors of NEC for several years.

=== Staff ===
The NEC staff is Oryx Cohen, Kimberly Ewing, Shira Collings, and Felicity Krueger.

The deceased advocate Judi Chamberlin was an NEC staff person. Chamberlin was diagnosed with depression at the age of 21 but considered herself recovered, which she attributed to having been a non-compliant patient.

NEC consultants are Daniel Fisher, Deborah Trueheart, Joana Archangel, and Juan Velez Court.
