= Psychiatric survivors movement =

Movement of those affected by psychiatric abuse

The psychiatric survivors movement (more broadly consumer/survivor/ex-patient movement) is a diverse association of individuals who either currently access mental health services (known as consumers or service users), or who have experienced interventions by psychiatry that were unhelpful, harmful, abusive, or illegal.

The psychiatric survivors movement arose out of the civil rights movement of the late 1960s and early 1970s and the personal histories of psychiatric abuse experienced by patients. The key text in the intellectual development of the survivor movement, at least in the US, was Judi Chamberlin's 1978 text On Our Own: Patient Controlled Alternatives to the Mental Health System. Chamberlin was an ex-patient and co-founder of the Mental Patients' Liberation Front. Coalescing around the ex-patient newsletter Dendron, in late 1988, leaders from several of the main national and grassroots psychiatric survivor groups felt that an independent, human rights coalition focused on problems in the mental health system was needed. That year the Support Coalition International (SCI) was formed. SCI's first public action was to stage a counter-conference and protest in New York City, in May 1990, at the same time as (and directly outside of) the American Psychiatric Association's annual meeting. In 2005, the SCI changed its name to MindFreedom International with David W. Oaks as its director.

Common themes are "talking back to the power of psychiatry," rights protection and advocacy, self-determination, and building capacity for lived experience leadership. While activists in the movement may share a collective identity to some extent, views range along a continuum from conservative to radical in relation to psychiatric treatment and levels of resistance or patienthood.

== History ==
=== Precursors ===
The modern self-help and advocacy movement in the field of mental health services developed in the 1970s, but former psychiatric patients have been campaigning for centuries to change laws, treatments, services and public policies. "The most persistent critics of psychiatry have always been former mental hospital patients", although few were able to tell their stories publicly or to openly confront the psychiatric establishment, and those who did so were commonly considered so extreme in their charges that they could seldom gain credibility. In 1620 in England, patients of the notoriously harsh Bethlem Hospital banded together and sent a "Petition of the Poor Distracted People in the House of Bedlam (concerned with conditions for inmates)" to the House of Lords. A number of ex-patients published pamphlets against the system in the 18th century, such as Samuel Bruckshaw (1774), on the "iniquitous abuse of private madhouses", and William Belcher (1796) with his "Address to humanity, Containing a letter to Dr Munro, a receipt to make a lunatic, and a sketch of a true smiling hyena". Such reformist efforts were generally opposed by madhouse keepers and medics.

In the late 18th century, moral treatment reforms developed which were originally based in part on the approach of French ex-patient turned hospital-superintendent Jean-Baptiste Pussin and his wife Margueritte. From 1848 in England, the Alleged Lunatics' Friend Society campaigned for sweeping reforms to the asylum system and abuses of the moral treatment approach. In the United States, The Opal (1851–1860) was a ten volume Journal produced by patients of Utica State Lunatic Asylum in New York, which has been viewed in part as an early liberation movement. Beginning in 1868, Elizabeth Packard, founder of the Anti-Insane Asylum Society, published a series of books and pamphlets describing her experiences in the Illinois insane asylum to which her husband had her committed.

=== Early 20th century ===
A few decades later, another former psychiatric patient, Clifford W. Beers, founded the National Committee on Mental Hygiene, which eventually became the National Mental Health Association. Beers sought to improve the plight of individuals receiving public psychiatric care, particularly those committed to state institutions. His book, A Mind That Found Itself (1908), described his experience with mental illness and the treatment he encountered in mental hospitals. Beers's work stimulated public interest in more responsible care and treatment. However, while Beers initially blamed psychiatrists for tolerating mistreatment of patients, and envisioned more ex-patient involvement in the movement, he was influenced by Adolf Meyer and the psychiatric establishment, and toned down his hostility as he needed their support for reforms. His reliance on rich donors and his need for approval from experts led him to hand over to psychiatrists the organization he helped establish. In the UK, the National Society for Lunacy Law Reform was established in 1920 by angry ex-patients sick of their experiences and complaints being patronisingly discounted by the authorities who were using medical "window dressing" for essentially custodial and punitive practices. In 1922, ex-patient Rachel Grant-Smith added to calls for reform of the system of neglect and abuse she had suffered by publishing "The Experiences of an Asylum Patient".

We Are Not Alone (WANA) was founded by a group of patients at Rockland State Hospital in New York (now the Rockland Psychiatric Center) in the mid to late 1940s, and continued to meet as an ex-patient group. Their goal was to provide support and advice and help others make the difficult transition from hospital to community. At this same time, a young social worker in Detroit, Michigan, John H. Beard, was doing some pioneering work with psychiatric patients from the “back wards” of Wayne County Hospital. Prior to the advent of psychotropic medication, patients on the “back wards” were generally considered to be "hopelessly sick." Beard began his work on these wards with the conviction that these patients were not totally consumed by illness but retained areas of health. This insight led him to involve the patients in such normal activities as picnics, attending a baseball game, dining at a fine restaurant, and then employment. Fountain House had, by now, recognized that the experience of the illness, together with a poor or interrupted work history often denied members the opportunity to obtain employment. Many lived in poverty and never got the chance to even try working on a job.

The hiring of John H. Beard as executive director in 1955 changed all of that. The creation of what we now know to be Transitional Employment transformed Fountain House as many members began venturing from the clubhouse into real jobs for real wages in the community. Importantly, these work opportunities were in integrated settings and not just with other persons with disabilities. The concept of what was normal was pervasive in all of what Fountain House set out to do. Thus, Fountain House became a place of both social and vocational rehabilitation, addressing the disabilities that so often accompany having a serious mental illness and setting the wheels in motion for a life of recovery and not disability.

Originated by crusaders in periods of liberal social change, and appealing not so much to other sufferers as to elite groups with power, when the early reformer's energy or influence waned, mental patients were again mostly friendless and forgotten.

=== 1950s to 1970s ===
The 1950s saw the reduction in the use of lobotomy and shock therapy. These used to be associated with concerns and much opposition on grounds of basic morality, harmful effects, or misuse. Towards the 1960s, psychiatric medications came into widespread use and also caused controversy relating to adverse effects and misuse. There were also associated moves away from large psychiatric institutions to community-based services (later to become a full-scale deinstitutionalization), which sometimes empowered service users, although community-based services were often deficient. There has been some discussion within the field about the usefulness of antipsychotic medications in a world with a decreasing tolerance for institutionalization:

"With the advent of the modern antipsychotic medications and psychosocial treatments, the great majority are able to live in a range of open settings in the community—with family, in their own apartments, in board-and-care homes, and in halfway houses."

Coming to the fore in the 1960s, an anti-psychiatry movement challenged the fundamental claims and practices of mainstream psychiatry. The ex-patient movement of this time contributed to, and derived much from, antipsychiatry ideology, but has also been described as having its own agenda, described as humanistic socialism. For a time, the movement shared aims and practices with "radical therapists", who tended to be Marxist. However, the consumer/survivor/ex-patients gradually felt that the radical therapists did not necessarily share the same goals and were taking over, and they broke away from them in order to maintain independence.

By the 1970s, the women's movement, gay rights movement, and disability rights movements had emerged. It was in this context that former mental patients began to organize groups with the common goals of fighting for patients' rights and against forced treatment, stigma and discrimination, and often to promote peer-run services as an alternative to the traditional mental health system. Unlike professional mental health services, which were usually based on the medical model, peer-run services were based on the principle that individuals who have shared similar experiences can help themselves and each other through self-help and mutual support. Many of the individuals who organized these early groups identified themselves as psychiatric survivors. Their groups had names such as Insane Liberation Front and the Network Against Psychiatric Assault. NAPA co-founder Leonard Roy Frank founded (with colleague Wade Hudson) Madness Network News in San Francisco in 1972.

In 1971 the Scottish Union of Mental Patients was founded. In 1973 some of those involved founded the Mental Patients' Union in London.

Dorothy Weiner and about 10 others, including Tom Wittick, established the Insane Liberation Front in the spring of 1970 in Portland, Oregon. Though it only lasted six months, it had a notable influence in the history of North American ex-patients groups. News that former inmates of mental institutions were organizing was carried to other parts of North America. Former ILF member Howard Geld, known as Howie the Harp for his harmonica playing, left Portland to return to his native New York and help found the Mental Patients Liberation Project in 1971. During the early 1970s, groups spread to California, New York, and Boston, which were primarily antipsychiatry, opposed to forced treatment including forced drugging, shock treatment and involuntary committal. In 1972, the first organized group in Canada, the Mental Patients Association, started to publish In A Nutshell, while in the US the first edition of the first national publication by ex-mental patients, Madness Network News, was published in Oakland, continuing until 1986.

Some all-women groups developed around this time such as Women Against Psychiatric Assault, begun in 1975 in San Francisco.

In 1978, Judi Chamberlin's book On Our Own: Patient Controlled Alternatives to the Mental Health System was published. It became the standard text of the psychiatric survivors movement, and in it Chamberlin coined the word "mentalism."

The major spokespeople of the movement have been described in generalities as largely white, middle-class and well-educated. It has been suggested that other activists were often more anarchistic and anti-capitalist, felt more cut off from society and more like a minority with more in common with the poor, ethnic minorities, feminists, prisoners & gay rights than with the white middle classes. The leaders were sometimes considered to be merely reformist and, because of their "stratified position" within society, to be uncomprehending of the problems of the poor. The "radicals" saw no sense in seeking solutions within a capitalist system that creates mental problems. However, they were united in considering society and psychiatric domination to be the problem, rather than people designated mentally ill.

Some activists condemned psychiatry under any conditions, voluntary or involuntary, while others believed in the right of people to undergo psychiatric treatment on a voluntary basis. Voluntary psychotherapy, at the time mainly psychoanalysis, did not therefore come under the same severe attack as the somatic therapies. The ex-patients emphasized individual support from other patients; they espoused assertiveness, liberation, and equality; and they advocated user-controlled services as part of a totally voluntary continuum. However, although the movement espoused egalitarianism and opposed the concept of leadership, it is said to have developed a cadre of known, articulate, and literate men and women who did the writing, talking, organizing, and contacting. Very much the product of the rebellious, populist, anti-elitist mood of the 1960s, they strived above all for self-determination and self-reliance. In general, the work of some psychiatrists, as well as the lack of criticism by the psychiatric establishment, was interpreted as an abandonment of a moral commitment to do no harm. There was anger and resentment toward a profession that had the authority to label them as mentally disabled and was perceived as infantilizing them and disregarding their wishes.

=== 1980s and 1990s ===
By the 1980s, individuals who considered themselves "consumers" of mental health services rather than passive "patients" had begun to organize self-help/advocacy groups and peer-run services. While sharing some of the goals of the earlier movement, consumer groups did not seek to abolish the traditional mental health system, which they believed was necessary. Instead, they wanted to reform it and have more choice. Consumer groups encouraged their members to learn as much as possible about the mental health system so that they could gain access to the best services and treatments available. In 1985, the National Mental Health Consumers' Association was formed in the United States.

A 1986 report on developments in the United States noted that "there are now three national organizations ... The ‘conservatives’ have created the National Mental Health Consumers' Association ... The ‘moderates’ have formed the National Alliance of Mental Patients ... The ‘radical’ group is called the Network to Abolish Psychiatry". Many, however, felt that they had survived the psychiatric system and its "treatments" and resented being called consumers. The National Association of Mental Patients in the United States became the National Association of Psychiatric Survivors. "Phoenix Rising: The Voice of the Psychiatrized" was published by ex-inmates (of psychiatric hospitals) in Toronto from 1980 to 1990, known across Canada for its antipsychiatry stance.

In late 1988, leaders from several of the main national and grassroots psychiatric survivor groups decided an independent coalition was needed, and Support Coalition International (SCI) was formed in 1988, later to become MindFreedom International. In addition, the World Network of Users and Survivors of Psychiatry (WNUSP), was founded in 1991 as the World Federation of Psychiatric Users (WFPU), an international organisation of recipients of mental health services.

An emphasis on voluntary involvement in services is said to have presented problems to the movement since, especially in the wake of deinstitutionalization, community services were fragmented and many individuals in distressed states of mind were being put in prisons or re-institutionalized in community services, or became homeless, often distrusting and resisting any help.

Science journalist Robert Whitaker has concluded that patients rights groups have been speaking out against psychiatric abuses for decades - the torturous treatments, the loss of freedom and dignity, the misuse of seclusion and restraints, the neurological damage caused by drugs - but have been condemned and dismissed by the psychiatric establishment and others. Recipients of mental health services demanded control over their own treatment and sought to influence the mental health system and society's views.

== The movement today ==
In the United States, the number of mental health mutual support groups (MSG), self-help organizations (SHO) (run by and for mental health consumers and/or family members) and consumer-operated services (COS) was estimated in 2002 to be 7,467. In Canada, CSI's (Consumer Survivor Initiatives) are the preferred term. "In 1991 Ontario led the world in its formal recognition of CSI's as part of the core services offered within the mental health sector when it began to formally fund CSI's across the province. Consumer Survivor Initiatives in Ontario Building an Equitable Future' (2009) pg 7. The movement may express a preference for the "survivor" label over the "consumer" label, with more than 60 percent of ex-patient groups reported to support anti-psychiatry beliefs and considering themselves to be "psychiatric survivors." There is some variation between the perspective on the consumer/survivor movement coming from psychiatry, anti-psychiatry or consumers/survivors themselves.

The most common terms in Germany are "Psychiatrie-Betroffene" (people afflicted by/confronted with psychiatry) and "Psychiatrie-Erfahrene" (people who have experienced psychiatry). Sometimes the terms are considered as synonymous but sometimes the former emphasizes the violence and negative aspects of psychiatry. The German national association of (ex-)users and survivors of psychiatry is called the Bundesverband Psychiatrie-Erfahrener (BPE).

There are many grassroots self-help groups of consumers/survivors, local and national, all over the world, which are an important cornerstone of empowerment. A considerable obstacle to realizing more consumer/survivor alternatives is lack of funding. Alternative consumer/survivor groups like the National Empowerment Center in the US which receive public funds but question orthodox psychiatric treatment, have often come under attack for receiving public funding and been subject to funding cuts.

As well as advocacy and reform campaigns, the development of self-help and user/survivor controlled services is a central issue. The Runaway-House in Berlin, Germany, is an example. Run by the Organisation for the Protection from Psychiatric Violence, it is an antipsychiatric crisis centre for homeless survivors of psychiatry where the residents can live for a limited amount of time and where half the staff members are survivors of psychiatry themselves. In Helsingborg, Sweden, the Hotel Magnus Stenbock is run by a user/survivor organization "RSMH" that gives users/survivors a possibility to live in their own apartments. It is financed by the Swedish government and run entirely by users. Voice of Soul is a user/survivor organization in Hungary. Creative Routes is a user/survivor organization in London, England, that among other support and advocacy activities puts on an annual "Bonkersfest".

WNUSP is a consultant organization for the United Nations. After a "long and difficult discussion", ENUSP and WNUSP (European and World Networks of Users and Survivors of Psychiatry) decided to employ the term (ex-)users and survivors of psychiatry in order to include the identities of the different groups and positions represented in these international NGOs. WNUSP contributed to the development of the UN's Convention on the Rights of Persons with Disabilities and produced a manual to help people use it entitled "Implementation Manual for the United Nations Convention on the Rights of Persons with Disabilities", edited by Myra Kovary. ENUSP is consulted by the European Union and World Health Organization.

In 2007 at a Conference held in Dresden on "Coercive Treatment in Psychiatry: A Comprehensive Review", the president and other leaders of the World Psychiatric Association met, following a formal request from the World Health Organization, with four representatives from leading consumer/survivor groups.

The National Coalition for Mental Health Recovery (formerly known as National Coalition for Mental Health Consumer/Survivor Organizations) campaigns in the United States to ensure that consumer/survivors have a major voice in the development and implementation of health care, mental health, and social policies at the state and national levels, empowering people to recover and lead a full life in the community.

The United States Massachusetts-based Freedom Center provides and promotes alternative and holistic approaches and takes a stand for greater choice and options in treatments and care. The center and the New York-based Icarus Project (which does not self-identify as a consumer/survivor organization but has participants that identify as such) have published a Harm Reduction Guide To Coming Off Psychiatric Drugs and were recently a featured charity in Forbes business magazine.

Mad pride events, organized by loosely connected groups in at least seven countries including Australia, South Africa, the United States, Canada, the United Kingdom and Ghana, draw thousands of participants. For some, the objective is to continue the destigmatization of mental illness. Another wing rejects the need to treat mental afflictions with psychotropic drugs and seeks alternatives to the "care" of the medical establishment. Many members of the movement say they are publicly discussing their own struggles to help those with similar conditions and to inform the general public.

Survivor David Oaks, director of MindFreedom, hosted a monthly radio show and the Freedom Center initiated a weekly FM radio show now syndicated on the Pacifica Network, Madness Radio, hosted by Freedom Center co-founder Will Hall.

A new International Coalition of National Consumer/User Organizations was launched in Canada in 2007, called Interrelate.

== Impact ==
Research into consumer/survivor initiatives (CSIs) suggests they can help with social support, empowerment, mental wellbeing, self-management and reduced service use, identity transformation and enhanced quality of life. However, studies have focused on the support and self-help aspects of CSIs, neglecting that many organizations locate the causes of members’ problems in political and social institutions and are involved in activities to address issues of social justice.

A 2006 series of studies in Canada compared individuals who participated in CSIs with those who did not. The two groups were comparable at baseline on a wide range of demographic variables, self-reported psychiatric diagnosis, service use, and outcome measures. After a year and a half, those who had participated in CSIs showed significant improvement in social support and quality of life (daily activities), fewer days of psychiatric hospitalization, and more were likely to have stayed in employment (paid or volunteer) and/or education. There was no significant difference on measures of community integration and personal empowerment, however. There were some limitations to the findings; although the active and nonactive groups did not differ significantly at baseline on measures of distress or hospitalization, the active group did have a higher mean score and there may have been a natural pattern of recovery over time for that group (regression to the mean). The authors noted that the apparent positive impacts of consumer-run organizations were achieved at a fraction of the cost of professional community programs.

Further qualitative studies indicated that CSIs can provide safe environments that are a positive, welcoming place to go; social arenas that provide opportunities to meet and talk with peers; an alternative worldview that provides opportunities for members to participate and contribute; and effective facilitators of community integration that provide opportunities to connect members to the community at large. System-level activism was perceived to result in changes in perceptions by the public and mental health professionals (about mental health or mental illness, the lived experience of consumer/survivors, the legitimacy of their opinions, and the perceived value of CSIs) and in concrete changes in service delivery practice, service planning, public policy, or funding allocations. The authors noted that the evidence indicated that the work benefits other consumers/survivors (present and future), other service providers, the general public, and communities. They also noted that there were various barriers to this, most notably lack of funding, and also that the range of views represented by the CSIs appeared less narrow and more nuanced and complex than previously, and that perhaps the consumer/survivor social movement is at a different place than it was 25 years ago.

A significant theme that has emerged from consumer/survivor work, as well as from some psychiatrists and other mental health professionals, has been a recovery model which seeks to overturn therapeutic pessimism and to support sufferers to forge their own personal journey towards the life they want to live; some argue, however, that it has been used as a cover to blame people for not recovering or to cut public services.

There has also been criticism of the movement. Organized psychiatry often views radical consumerist groups as extremist, as having little scientific foundation and no defined leadership, as "continually trying to restrict the work of psychiatrists and care for the seriously mentally ill", and as promoting disinformation on the use of involuntary commitment, electroconvulsive therapy, stimulants and antidepressants among children, and neuroleptics among adults. However, opponents consistently argue that psychiatry is territorial and profit-driven and stigmatizes and undermines the self-determination of patients and ex-patients. The movement has also argued against social stigma or mentalism by wider society.

People in the US, led by figures such as psychiatrists E. Fuller Torrey and Sally Satel, and some leaders of the National Alliance on Mental Illness, have lobbied against the funding of consumer/survivor groups that promote antipsychiatry views or promote social and experiential recovery rather than a biomedical model, or who protest against outpatient commitment. Torrey has said the term "psychiatric survivor" used by ex-patients to describe themselves is just political correctness and has blamed them, along with civil rights lawyers, for the deaths of half a million people due to suicides and deaths on the street. His accusations have been described as inflammatory and completely unsubstantiated, however, and issues of self-determination and self-identity have been said to be more complex than that.

== See also ==
- Aggression in healthcare
- Alleged Lunatics' Friend Society
- Anti-psychiatry
- Commissioners in Lunacy
- Critical Psychiatry Network
- Disability rights movement
- Disability flag
- Duplessis Orphans
- Mad studies
- Millfields Charter, an electronic charter regarding prone restraint holds
- Neurodiversity
- Neuroplasticity, how the brain changes in the course of a lifetime
- The Shrink Next Door
