= MindFreedom International =

U.S.-based organization

A banner ad for MindFreedom International

MindFreedom International is an international antipsychiatry organization. Based in the United States, it was founded in 1990 to advocate against involuntary psychiatric treatment. Its stated mission is to protect the rights of people who have been labeled with psychiatric disorders.

== Origins and purpose ==
MindFreedom International is rooted in the psychiatric survivors movement, which arose out of the civil rights movement. The precursors of MFI include ex-patient groups of the 1970s such as the Portland, Oregon-based Insane Liberation Front and the Mental Patients' Liberation Front in New York. The organization was inspired by Judi Chamberlin's 1978 work, On Our Own: Patient Controlled Alternatives to the Mental Health System. Chamberlin was an ex-patient and co-founder of the Mental Patients' Liberation Front. Coalescing around the ex-patient newsletter Dendron, in late 1988 leaders from several of the main national and grassroots psychiatric survivor groups felt that an independent, human rights coalition focused on problems in the mental health system was needed. That year the Support Coalition International (SCI) was formed. In 2005, the SCI changed its name to MFI with David W. Oaks as its director. SCI's first public action was to stage a counter-conference and protest in May 1990 in New York City directly outside of the American Psychiatric Association's annual meeting.

Many of the members of MFI refer to themselves as 'psychiatric survivors'. MF does not define itself as an antipsychiatry organization and its members point to the role which 'compassionate' psychiatrists have played in MFI. Activists within the coalition have been drawn from both left and right wing of politics.

MFI functions as a forum for its thousands of members to express their views and experiences, to form support networks and to organize activist campaigns in support of human rights in psychiatry. The coalition regards the psychiatric practices of 'unscientific labeling, forced drugging, solitary confinement, restraints, involuntary commitment, electroshock' as human rights violations.

In 2003, eight Mindfreedom members, led by then-executive director David Oaks, went on a hunger strike to publicize a series of "challenges" they had put forth to the American Psychiatric Association (APA), the US Surgeon General and the National Alliance on Mental Illness (NAMI). The eight MFI members challenged the APA, US Surgeon General and NAMI to present MFI with "unambiguous proof that mental illness is brain disorder."

MindFreedom describes their Shield Program as "an all for one and one for all" network of members. When a registered member is receiving (or is being considered for) involuntary psychiatric treatment, an alert is sent to the MindFreedom Solidarity Network on that person's behalf. Members of the network are then expected to participate in organized, constructive, nonviolent actions—e.g., political action, publicity and media alerts, passive resistance, etc.—to stop or prevent the forced treatment.

In 2011, MindFreedom was recognized by the United Nations Economic and Social Council as a human rights NGO with Consultative Roster Status.

== See also ==
- Anti-psychiatry
- Psychiatric survivors movement

== Literature ==
- Oaks, David W. (2007). ‘MindFreedom International: Activism for Human Rights as the Basis for a Nonviolent Revolution in the Mental Health System’. In Peter Stastny & Peter Lehmann (Eds.), Alternatives Beyond Psychiatry (pp. 328–336). Berlin / Eugene / Shrewsbury: Peter Lehmann Publishing. ISBN 978-0-9545428-1-8 (UK), ISBN 978-0-9788399-1-8 (USA). E-Book in 2018.
- Oaks, David W. (2007). ‘MindFreedom International – Engagement für Menschenrechte als Grundlage einer gewaltfreien Revolution im psychosozialen System’. In: Peter Lehmann & Peter Stastny (Hg.), Statt Psychiatrie 2 (S. 344-352). Berlin / Eugene / Shrewsbury: Antipsychiatrieverlag. ISBN 978-3-925931-38-3. E-Book in 2018.
- Taylor, Dan (2007). ‘MindFreedom Ghana: Fighting for Basic Human Conditions of Psychiatric Patients’. In Peter Stastny & Peter Lehmann (Eds.), Alternatives Beyond Psychiatry (pp. 336–342). Berlin / Eugene / Shrewsbury: Peter Lehmann Publishing. ISBN 978-0-9545428-1-8 (UK), ISBN 978-0-9788399-1-8 (USA). E-Book in 2018.
- Taylor, Dan (2007). ‘MindFreedom Ghana – Unser Kampf um humane Lebensbedingungen für Psychiatriebetroffene’. In: Peter Lehmann & Peter Stastny (Hg.), Statt Psychiatrie 2 (S. 352-358). Berlin / Eugene / Shrewsbury: Antipsychiatrieverlag. ISBN 978-3-925931-38-3. E-Book in 2018.
