= Icarus Project =

American mental health network (2002–2020)

The Icarus Project (2002–2020) was an American network of peer-support groups and media projects with the stated aim of changing the social stigmas regarding mental health. The project was rebranded as Fireweed Collective in 2020.

== History ==
In 2002, Sascha Altman DuBrul wrote an article published in the San Francisco Bay Guardian about his experiences being diagnosed with bipolar disorder. He founded the Icarus Project with Jacks McNamara, an artist and writer. The Project sought to create spaces where people could talk freely about their lived experiences in regards to their mental health.

Years later, musician-activist Bonfire Madigan Shive and counsellor/activist Will Hall became key members in The Icarus Project's administration and development.

== Mission ==
The Icarus Project's stated aims were to provide a "support network and education project by and for people who experience the world in ways that are often diagnosed as mental illness." The responsibilities of the group are to gather people locally for support, and access to alternatives to mainstream medical diagnosis and treatment. The Project advocates self-determination and caution when approaching psychiatric care. It encourages alternatives to the medical model that is accepted by mental health professionals.

In 2005, journalist Jennifer Itzenson noted that while the Icarus Project may accept those with a wide range of "perspectives" on mental health issues, there is also "an edge of militancy within the group," particularly among those who reject medication. Itzenson also writes that's the group's questioning of medical care is "misguided" and that rejecting medication is a "potentially fatal choice" for those with bipolar disorder.

While Icarus Project staff have described their expertise in social activism, herbalism, and labour organizing; none of them are licensed medical or mental health professionals. The Icarus Project advisory board members describe their members as educators, artists, activists, writers, healers, community organizers, and other creative types. Some members of the group identify as Latinx, queer, trans, people of colour or mixed race, and trauma survivors.

== Structure / funding ==
The Icarus Project was under the fiscal sponsorship of FJC, a non-profit 501(c)3 umbrella organization arm of an investment firm, based in New York City. The Icarus Project formerly got the bulk of its money from foundation grants, including the Ittleson Foundation, but it also had many individual donors.

== Publications ==
Educational materials published by The Icarus Project have been published in Spanish, German, French, Italian, Japanese, Greek, and Bosnian/Croatian. Some of these publications are listed below:

- Navigating the Space Between Brilliance and Madness; A Reader and Roadmap of Bipolar Worlds (2004)
- Friends Make the Best Medicine: A Guide to Creating Community Mental Health Support Networks. (2006)
- Through the Labyrinth; A Harm Reduction Guide to Coming Off Psychiatric Drugs (2009)
- Mindful Occupation: Rising Up without Burning Out (2012)
- Madness and Oppression: Personal Paths to Transformation and Collective Liberation (2015)

== Filmography ==
Films about Icarus Project members are listed below:

- Ken Paul Rosenthal (2010). Crooked Beauty. 30 min. Poetic documentary featuring Jacks McNamara. In Mad Dance Mental Health Film Trilogy.
- Ken Paul Rosenthal (2018). Whisper Rapture. 36 min. A doc-opera featuring Bonfire Madigan Shive.
