= Rufus May =

British clinical psychologist (born 1968)

- Education: University of East London
- Occupation: Clinical Psychologist
- Website: rufusmay.com

Rufus May (born 1968) is a British clinical psychologist best known for using his own experiences of being a psychiatric patient to promote alternative recovery approaches for those experiencing psychotic symptoms. After formally qualifying as a clinical psychologist, he then disclosed that he had been previously detained in hospital with a diagnosis of schizophrenia.

== Early life and education ==
May grew up in Islington, north London.

May qualified from the University of East London in 1998.

== Experiences of mental health ==
May was diagnosed with schizophrenia in 1986 at age 18. May was compulsorily detained in a psychiatric hospital on three occasions. He understands his psychotic experiences as a reaction to experiences of emotional loss and social isolation. Among other beliefs, he developed ideas he was an apprentice spy for the British secret service. He also experienced messages from the radio and television. This eventually led to three admissions to Hackney Hospital within 14 months.

After a year of receiving psychiatric drug treatment, Rufus May decided to stop being involved with psychiatric services and stop taking the drugs he was being prescribed; he then used exercise, creative activities, social relationships and voluntary work to regain his well-being.

== Clinical approach ==
Rufus May has used his professional knowledge and own experiences of psychosis to focus on developing services that are more patient centered and therapeutic approaches that are more collaborative, without relying on chemical imbalance theories of mental distress. For example, he works with those experiencing auditory hallucinations by conversing directly with the voice to help discover the meaning of these dissociative experiences. He draws upon the Nonviolent Communication style developed by Marshall Rosenberg and mindfulness.

His approach received considerable publicity when it was the subject of The Doctor Who Hears Voices, a 2008 British television documentary broadcast on Channel 4 about a junior doctor helped by May to overcome her experiences of hearing voices. Directed by Leo Regan, the documentary depicts the therapy which May provided to the junior doctor, played by actress Ruth Wilson. The programme created a significant reaction with both support and criticism of May's approach and was a 2008 finalist in the Mind Mental health media awards.

== Religion and culture ==
May has expressed sympathy for individuals who come from various cultural backgrounds or those who hold specific religious beliefs in regards to proper treatment.

He has stated that "...for many people their voices are spiritual entities...we are working alongside traditional spiritual healers to create healing workshops that will help people deal with negative spirits. To insist on medicalizing this experience is now being recognized as culturally oppressive and colonial."

== Professional career ==
May has worked as a clinical psychologist in Tower Hamlets, East London, England. He currently works as a clinical psychologist in an assertive outreach team in Bradford, England. He is actively involved in consumer recovery groups such as the hearing voices network and a Bradford mental health discussion and campaign group, Evolving Minds.

He often provides comments in the British media against the use of compulsory detention and the forcibly use of medications legislation.

His story has received a number of awards, including a Mental Health Media Survivor and Factual Radio awards in October 2001 for Fergal Keane's show Taking a Stand on Radio Four. and a 2008 award for the TV documentary.

== Publications ==
- May, R. (2000) "Routes to recovery from psychosis: The roots of a clinical psychologist", Clinical Psychology Forum 146: 6–10.
- May, R. (2004) "Making sense of psychotic experiences and working towards recovery". In J. Gleeson & P. McGorry, (eds.) Psychological interventions in early psychosis. Chichester: Wiley.
- May, R. (2007) "Working outside the diagnostic frame". The Psychologist Vol 20, No 5, pp. 300–301.
- May, R. (2007) "Reclaiming mad experience: Establishing Unusual Belief Groups and Evolving Minds public meetings"'. In Peter Stastny & Peter Lehmann (eds.), Alternatives Beyond Psychiatry (pp. 117–127). Berlin / Eugene / Shrewsbury: Peter Lehmann Publishing. ISBN 978-0-9545428-1-8 (UK), ISBN 978-0-9788399-1-8 (USA). (E-Book 2018)
- May, R. (2007) "Zur Wiederaneignung verrückter Erfahrungen. Gruppen für Menschen mit außergewöhnlichen Überzeugungen". In Peter Lehmann & Peter Stastny (eds.), Statt Psychiatrie 2 (pp. 119–130). Berlin / Eugene / Shrewsbury: Antipsychiatrieverlag. ISBN 978-3-925931-38-3. (E-Book 2018)
- May, R. (2009) personal story of recovery in Living with Voices: 50 Stories of Recovery by Marius Romme, Sandra Escher, Jacqui Dillon, Dirk Corstens, Mervyn Morris. ISBN 978-1-906254-22-3
- May, R. (2023) "Die Stimmen aller". In Will Hall, Jenseits der Psychiatrie – Stimmen und Visionen des Wahnsinns im Madness Radio. Berlin & Lancaster: Peter Lehmann Publishing, pp. 283–285. ISBN 978-3-910546-23-3 (paperback), ISBN 978-3-910546-26-4 (e-book)

== See also ==
- Critical psychiatry
- Hearing Voices Network
