= Marius Romme =

Dutch psychiatrist (1934–2026)

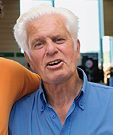
- Romme in 2011
- Born: Marius Anton Joannes Romme; 17 January 1934; Amsterdam, Netherlands
- Died: 4 June 2026 (aged 92); Maastricht, Netherlands
- Education: University of Amsterdam
- Known for: Hearing Voices Movement; Experience Focussed Counselling
- Scientific career
- Fields: Social psychiatry
- Workplaces: Maastricht University

Marius Anton Joannes Romme (17 January 1934 – 4 June 2026) was a Dutch psychiatrist. He is best known for his work on hearing voices (auditory hallucinations) and regarded as the founder and principal theorist for the Hearing Voices Movement.

== Early life, family and education ==
Born in Amsterdam, Romme was a son of the Dutch politician C.P.M. Romme, leader of the Catholic party KVP from 1946 to 1961. Romme studied medicine at the University of Amsterdam, where he also received his PhD in 1967.

== Career ==
From 1974 to 1999 he was professor of social psychiatry at the Medical Faculty of the University of Maastricht, as well as consultant psychiatrist at the Community Mental Health Centre in Maastricht, the Netherlands.

He was subsequently a visiting professor at the Mental Health Policy Centre, Birmingham City University in Birmingham, UK.

Romme is credited with developing Experience Focussed Counselling with Sandra Escher and Joachim Schnackenberg.

Romme's death was announced on 8 June 2026, at the age of 92.

== Publications ==
Publications by Marius Romme et al.:

1. Escher, A.D.M.A.C., Romme, M.A.J., Breuls, M., Driessen, G. (1987). "Maatschappelijk kwetsbaar en langdurig psychiatrisch ziek zijn". Tijdschrift voor Psychiatrie, 29:5,266-281.
2. Escher, A.D.M.A.C., Romme, M.A.J. (1989). Stemmen horen. Positieve effecten van leren omgaan met stemmen. Tijdschrift voor Ziekenverpleging 24, p. 784-788.
3. Escher, A.D.M.A.C., Romme, M.A.J. (1991). Het dagboek als communicatiemiddel bij auditieve hallucinaties. Tijdschrift voor Ziekenverpleging (TVZ) 15 augustus 1991 543-547 Escher., A.D.M.A.C. (1993). Stemmen horen: ziekte, gave, topervaring of fase in een groeiproces? Klankspiegel, maart 1993.
4. Escher, A., Romme, M. (1998) Small talk: voice-hearing in Children. Open Mind July/August.
5. Escher, A., Romme, M., Buiks, A., Delespaul, Ph., Van Os, J. (2002a). Independent course of childhood auditory hallucinations: a sequential 3-year follow-up study. British Journal of Psychiatry. 181 (suppl. 43), s10-s18.
6. Escher A., Romme M., Buiks A., Delespaul Ph., Van Os J. (2002b). "Formation of delusional ideation in adolescents hearing voices: a prospective study". American Journal of Medical Genetics. 114 (8): 913–920. doi:10.1002/ajmg.10203. PMID 12457385.
7. Escher, A.D.M., Romme, M.A.J., Buiks, A., Delespaul, Ph., Van Os, J. (2002). Kinderen en jeugdigen die stemmen horen: een prospectief driejarig onderzoek. Tijdschrift van de Vereniging voor kinder en jeugdpsychotherapie. Jaargang 29, nr. 4. blz. 4-21.
8. Escher, A., Romme, M. (2002). Het Maastrichts Interview voor kinderen en Jeugdigen (MIK). Tijdschrift van de Vereniging voor kinder en jeugdpsychotherapie. Jaargang 29, nr. 4. blz. 22-45.
9. Escher A., Delespaul P., Romme M., Buiks A., Van Os. J. (2003). "Coping defence and depression in adolescents hearing voices". Journal of Mental Health. 12 (1): 91–99. doi:10.1080/09638230021000058. S2CID 73075886.
10. Escher, A. D., Romme, M. A., et al. (2003). Formación de la ideación delirante en adolescentes con alucinaciones auditivas: un estudio prospectivo. Intervención en crisis y tratamiento agudo de los trastornos psiquiátricos graves. P. Pichot, J. Ezcurra, A. González-Pinto and M. Gutiérrz Fraile. Madrid, Aula Médica Ediciones: 185-208.
11. Escher A., Morris M., Buiks A., Delespaul Ph., Van Os J., Romme M. (2004). "Determinants of outcome in the pathways through care for children hearing voices". International Journal of Social Welfare. 13 (3): 208–222. doi:10.1111/j.1369-6866.2004.00315.x.
12. Pennings, M.H.A., Romme, M.A.J., Buiks, A.A.J.G.M. (1996). Auditieve hallucinaties bij patiënten en niet-patiënten. Tijdschrift voor Psychiatrie.
13. Noorthoorn, E., Dijkman, C., Escher, A., Romme, M. (1988). Resultaten van de enquête, in Omgaan met stemmen horen. Blz. 199-214. Uitgever; Vakgroep Sociale psychiatrie, Rijksuniversiteit Limburg. Noorthoorn, O., Romme, M.A.J., Escher A.D.M.A.C. (1990). Wat kunnen mensen die stemmen horen de psychiatrie leren?. Sociale Dienstverlening in Nederland. Analyse en evaluatie (Red. E.K. Hicks) p. 60-70.
14. Romme, M.A.J., Escher, A., Radstake, D., Breuls, M. (1987). Een indeling in groepen van patiënten met een langdurige psychiatrische patiëntencarrière. Tijdschrift voor Psychiatrie, 29,4,197-211.
15. Romme, M.A.J., Escher, A.D.M.A.C. (1987). Leren omgaan met het horen van stemmen. Maandblad Geestelijk Volksgezondheid 718, p 825-831.
16. Romme, M.A.J., Escher, A.D.M.A.C. (Eds.) (1988). Research to practice in Community Psychiatry. van Gorkum, Maastricht/Assen.
17. Romme, M.A.J., Escher, A.D.M.A.C., Habets, V.P.M.J.H. (1988). Omgaan met stemmen horen. (red). Universiteit Maastricht, vakgroep sociale Psychiatrie.
18. Romme, M.A.J., Escher, A.D.M.A.C. Hearing Voices (1989). Schizophrenia Bulletin 15 (2): 209-216.
19. Romme, M.A.J., Escher, A.D.M.A.C. (1989). Effects of mutual contacts from people with auditory hallucinations. Perspectief no 3, 37-43, July 1989
20. Romme, M.A.J., Escher, A.D.M.A.C. (1989). Stimmen hőren inKontakt, Zeitschrift der HPE Österreich nr 116, Oktober 1989.
21. Romme, M.A.J., Escher, A.D.M.A.C. (1990). Effecten van het onderlinge contact tussen mensen die stemmen horen. Oostland no 2, 8-14.
22. Romme, M.A.J., Escher, A.D.M.A.C. (1990). Heard but not seen. Open Mind No 49, 16-18.
23. Romme, M.A.J., Escher, A.D.M.A.C. (1991). Sense in voices. Open Mind 53, The mental health magazine, 9 November.
24. Romme, M.A.J., Escher, A.D.M.A.C. (1991). Undire le Voci. Spazi della Menten nr. 8, December 1991 p 3-9.
25. Romme M.A.J., Honig A., Noorthoorn O., Escher A.D.M.A.C. (1992). "Coping with voices: an emancipatory approach". British Journal of Psychiatry. 161: 99–103. doi:10.1192/bjp.161.1.99. PMID 1638338. S2CID 24144548.
26. Romme, M.A.J., Escher, A.D.M.A.C. (Eds.). Accepting Voices (1993, second edition 1998), 258 pages, MIND Publications, London. ISBN 1874690138
27. Romme, M.A.J., Escher, A.D.M.A.C. (Eds.) (1997). Acceptare le voice [Accepting Voices]. Giuffrè editore. Milano (in Italian)
28. Romme, M.A.J., Escher, A.D.M.A.C. (Eds.) (1998). Признание голосов [Accepting Voices]. Kiev, Sfera. ISBN 9667267369 (in Russian)
29. Romme, M.A.J., Escher, A.D.M.A.C. (Eds.). Understanding voices: coping with auditory hallucinations and confusing realities (1996) First published by Rijksuniversiteit Maastricht, the Netherlands and also English edition, Handsell Publications.
30. Romme, M.A.J., Escher, A.D.M.A.C. (1997). Stimmen hőren akzeptieren. Psychiatrie-Verlag. Bonn.
31. Romme, M.A.J., Escher, A.D.M.A.C. (1997). Na compananhia das voces. Editorial Estampa, Lda., Lisboa Portugal.
32. Romme, M.A.J., Escher, A.D.M.A.C. (1997). Moniääniset. Printway Oy, Vantaa.Finland.
33. Romme, M.A.J., Escher, A.D.M.A.C. (1999). Omgaan met stemmen horen. Stichting Positieve Gezondheidszorg. Bemelen.
34. Romme, M.A.J., Escher, A.D.M.A.C. (1999). Stemmen horen accepteren. Tirion, Baarn.
35. Romme, M.A.J., Escher, A.D.M.A.C. (1999). Stimmenhören Akzeptieren, Neunplus 1 Berlin. Duitsland.
36. Romme, Marius and Escher, Sandra: Making Sense of Voices – A guide for professionals who work with voice hearers: (2000) MIND Publications
37. Romme, M.A.J., Escher, A.D.M.A.C. (2003). Förstå och hantera roster. RSNH. Riksförbundet för Social och Mental Hälsa.Stockholm. Sweden
38. Romme, M.A.J., Escher, A.D.M.A.C. (2003). Giv stemmerne mening. Systime Academic. Århus, Denmark.
39. Romme, M.A.J., Escher, A.D.M.A.C. (2005). Managing Distressing Voice Hearing Experiences In Wellness Recovery Action Plan. Mary Ellen Copeland edited by Piers Allott. P. Sefton Recovery Group, Liverpool, UK. P. 114-118.
40. Romme, M.A.J., Escher, A.D.M.A.C. (2006). Nachwort. In Hannelore Klafki, Meine Stimmen – Quälgeister und Schutzengel. Texte einer engagierten Stimmenhörerin (pp. 175–178). Berlin / Eugene / Shrewsbury: Antipsychiatrieverlag. ISBN 978-3-925931-42-0. (E-Book 2016).
41. Romme, M.A.J., Escher, A.D.M.A.C. (2007). Intervoice: Stimmenhören akzeptieren und verstehen. In Peter Lehmann & Peter Stastny (Eds.), Statt Psychiatrie 2 (pp. 134–140). Berlin / Eugene / Shrewsbury: Antipsychiatrieverlag. ISBN 978-3-925931-38-3. (E-Book 2018).
42. Romme, M.A.J., Escher, A.D.M.A.C. (2007). Intervoice: Accepting and making sense of hearing voices. In Peter Stastny & Peter Lehmann (Eds.), Alternatives Beyond Psychiatry (pp. 131–137). Berlin / Eugene / Shrewsbury: Peter Lehmann Publishing. ISBN 978-0-9545428-1-8 (UK), ISBN 978-0-9788399-1-8 (USA). (E-Book 2018).
43. Romme, Marius, Morris, Mervyn. The harmful concept of Schizophrenia, Mental Health Nursing, 7–11 March 2007.
44. Romme, M.A.J., Escher, A.D.M.A.C. (Eds.) (2013). Psychosis as a Personal Crisis: An Experience-Based Approach. Routledge. ISBN 1136620990

== See also ==
- Hearing Voices Network
- Hearing Voices Movement
- Interpretation of Schizophrenia
- Ross Institute for Psychological Trauma
- Trauma model of mental disorders
- Experience Focussed Counselling
