= Sandra Escher =

Dutch psychiatrist (1947–2021)

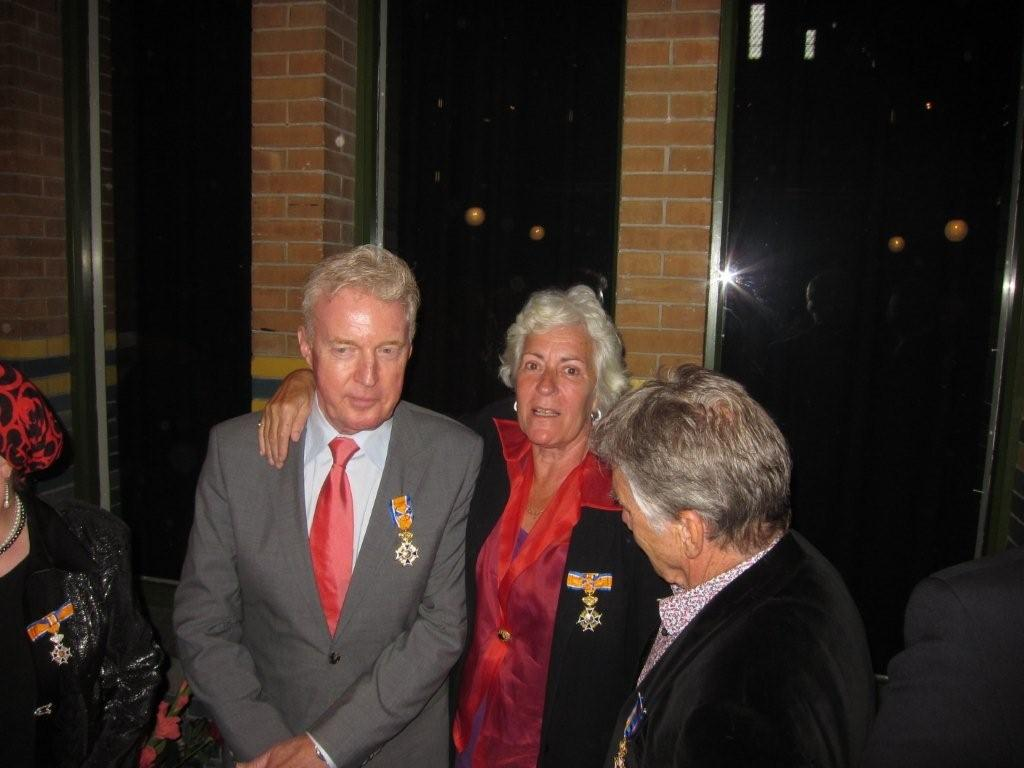
- Sandra Escher at the Amsterdam Beurs of Berlage
- Born: Alexandre Dorothée Marie Adriaan Charlotte Escher; 14 June 1945; The Hague, Netherlands
- Died: 31 May 2021 (aged 75); Amsterdam, Netherlands
- Known for: Hearing Voices Movement; Experience Focussed Counselling
- Scientific career
- Fields: Mental health advocacy
- Workplaces: Maastricht University

Alexandre Dorothée Marie Adriaan Charlotte Escher (14 June 1945 – 31 May 2021) was a Dutch mental health advocate and researcher, known for her work with the hearing voices movement.

== Biography ==
Sandra Escher was born in The Hague, the Netherlands. She trained at the School of Journalism in Utrecht.

Escher began a three-year follow-up on 80 children hearing voices, on this research she earned her MPhil and PhD in Birmingham. She earned her PhD at the University of Maastricht.

Escher began to work at the University of Maastricht, department of Social Psychiatry. She became also a senior staff member at the Community mental Health Centre in Maastricht in 1987. Since that time she works together with Dutch psychiatrist Marius Romme on the hearing voices project. With Romme she wrote two books which have been translated into several languages. With him she developed the Maastricht Interview for Voice hearers. Sandra organised eight annual well attended congresses and helped voice hearers to write their presentations. In 1999 she became an honorary research fellow at the University of Central England in Birmingham. She was a co-director of Intervoice.

Together with Wilma Boevink, she edited the book Making Sense of Self-Harm (2001). Since 2002, she participated in an international teaching project funded by the European community. She developed a module which trains voices hearers to use their experience to train professionals and uses the module to train experts by experience now. She was trainer in the Maastricht Interview.

She is also credited with developing Experience Focussed Counselling together with Marius Romme and Joachim Schnackenberg.

Escher was married to Marius Romme. She died 31 May 2021 in Amsterdam at age 75.

== Publications ==
- Escher, A.D.M.A.C., Romme, M.A.J., Breuls, M., Driessen, G. (1987). Maatschappelijk kwetsbaar en langdurig psychiatrisch ziek zijn. Tijdschrift voor Psychiatrie, 29:5, 266–281.
- Escher, A.D.M.A.C., Romme, M.A.J. (1989). Stemmen horen. Positieve effecten van leren omgaan met stemmen. Tijdschrift voor Ziekenverpleging 24, p. 784-788.
- Escher, A.D.M.A.C., Romme, M.A.J. (1991). Het dagboek als communicatiemiddel bij auditieve hallucinaties. Tijdschrift voor Ziekenverpleging (TVZ) 15 augustus 1991 543-547 Escher., A.D.M.A.C. (1993). Stemmen horen: ziekte, gave, topervaring of fase in een groeiproces? Klankspiegel, maart 1993.
- Escher, A., Romme, M. (1998). "Small talk: voice-hearing in Children". Open Mind July/August.
- Escher, A., Romme, M., Buiks, A., Delespaul, Ph., Van Os, J. (2002a). Independent course of childhood auditory hallucinations: a sequential 3-year follow-up study. British Journal of Psychiatry. 181 (suppl. 43), s10-s18.
- Escher, A., Romme, M., Buiks, A., Delespaul, Ph., Van Os, J. (2002b). Formation of delusional ideation in adolescents hearing voices: a prospective study. American Journal of Medical Genetics. 114: 913–920.
- Escher, A.D.M., Romme, M.A.J., Buiks, A., Delespaul, Ph., Van Os, J. (2002). Kinderen en jeugdigen die stemmen horen: een prospectief driejarig onderzoek. Tijdschrift van de Vereniging voor kinder en jeugdpsychotherapie. Jaargang 29, nr. 4. blz. 4-21.
- Escher, A., Romme, M. (2002). Het Maastrichts Interview voor kinderen en Jeugdigen (MIK). Tijdschrift van de Vereniging voor kinder en jeugdpsychotherapie. Jaargang 29, nr. 4. blz. 22–45.
- Escher, A., Delespaul, P., Romme, M., Buiks, A., Van Os. J. (2003). Coping defence and depression in adolescents hearing voices. Journal of Mental Health. 12,1,91-99.
- Escher, A. D., Romme, M. A., et al. (2003). Formación de la ideación delirante en adolescentes con alucinaciones auditivas: un estudio prospectivo. Intervención en crisis y tratamiento agudo de los trastornos psiquiátricos graves. P. Pichot, J. Ezcurra, A. González-Pinto and M. Gutiérrz Fraile. Madrid, Aula Médica Ediciones: 185–208.
- Escher, A., Morris, M., Buiks, A., Delespaul, Ph., Van Os, J., Romme, M. (2004). Determinants of outcome in the pathways through care for children hearing voices. International Journal of social Welfare. 13, 208–222.
- Romme, M.A.J., Escher, A.D.M.A.C. (2006). Nachwort. In Hannelore Klafki, Meine Stimmen – Quälgeister und Schutzengel. Texte einer engagierten Stimmenhörerin (pp. 175–178). Berlin / Eugene / Shrewsbury: Antipsychiatrieverlag. ISBN 978-3-925931-42-0. (E-Book 2016)
- Romme, M.A.J., Escher, A.D.M.A.C. (2007). Intervoice: Stimmenhören akzeptieren und verstehen. In Peter Lehmann & Peter Stastny (Eds.), Statt Psychiatrie 2 (pp. 134–140). Berlin / Eugene / Shrewsbury: Antipsychiatrieverlag. ISBN 978-3-925931-38-3. (E-Book 2018)
- Romme, M.A.J., Escher, A.D.M.A.C. (2007). Intervoice: Accepting and making sense of hearing voices. In Peter Stastny & Peter Lehmann (Eds.), Alternatives Beyond Psychiatry (pp. 131–137). Berlin / Eugene / Shrewsbury: Peter Lehmann Publishing. ISBN 978-0-9545428-1-8 (UK), ISBN 978-0-9788399-1-8 (USA). (E-Book 2018)
- Pennings, M.H.A., Romme, M.A.J., Buiks, A.A.J.G.M. (1996). Auditieve hallucinaties bij patiënten en niet-patiënten. Tijdschrift voor Psychiatrie.
- Noorthoorn, E., Dijkman, C., Escher, A., Romme, M. (1988). Resultaten van de enquête, in Omgaan met stemmen horen. Blz. 199–214. Uitgever; Vakgroep Sociale psychiatrie, Rijksuniversiteit Limburg. Noorthoorn, O., Romme, M.A.J., Escher A.D.M.A.C. (1990). Wat kunnen mensen die stemmen horen de psychiatrie leren?. Sociale Dienstverlening in Nederland. Analyse en evaluatie (Red. E.K. Hicks) p. 60-70.
- Romme, M.A.J., Escher, A., Radstake, D., Breuls, M. (1987). Een indeling in groepen van patiënten met een langdurige psychiatrische patiëntencarrière. Tijdschrift voor Psychiatrie, 29,4,197-211.
- Romme, M.A.J., Escher, A.D.M.A.C. (1987). Leren omgaan met het horen van stemmen. Maandblad Geestelijk Volksgezondheid 718, p 825–831.
- Romme, M.A.J., Escher, A.D.M.A.C. (Eds.) (1988). Research to practice in Community Psychiatry. van Gorkum, Maastricht/Assen.
- Romme, M.A.J., Escher, A.D.M.A.C., Habets, V.P.M.J.H. (1988). Omgaan met stemmen horen. (red). Universiteit Maastricht, vakgroep sociale Psychiatrie.
- Romme, M.A.J., Escher, A.D.M.A.C. Hearing Voices (1989). Schizophrenia Bulletin 15 (2): 209–216.
- Romme, M.A.J., Escher, A.D.M.A.C. (1989). Effects of mutual contacts from people with auditory hallucinations. Perspectief no 3, 37–43, July 1989.
- Romme, M.A.J., Escher, A.D.M.A.C. (1989). Stimmen hőren inKontakt, Zeitschrift der HPE Österreich nr 116, Oktober 1989.
- Romme, M.A.J., Escher, A.D.M.A.C. (1990). Effecten van het onderlinge contact tussen mensen die stemmen horen. Oostland no 2, 8–14.
- Romme, M.A.J., Escher, A.D.M.A.C. (1990). Heard but not seen. Open Mind No 49, 16–18.
- Romme, M.A.J., Escher, A.D.M.A.C. (1991). Sense in voices. Open Mind 53, The mental health magazine, 9 November.
- Romme, M.A.J., Escher, A.D.M.A.C. (1991). Undire le Voci. Spazi della Menten nr. 8, December 1991 p 3–9.
- Romme, M.A.J., Honig, A., Noorthoorn, O., Escher, A.D.M.A.C. (1992). Coping with voices: an emancipatory approach. British Journal of Psychiatry 161, 99-103
- Romme, M.A.J., Escher, A.D.M.A.C. (Eds.). Accepting Voices (1993, second edition 1998), 258 pages, MIND Publications, London. ISBN 1874690138
- Romme, M.A.J., Escher, A.D.M.A.C. (Eds.) (1997). Acceptare le voice [Accepting Voices]. Giuffrè editore. Milano (in Italian)
- Romme, M.A.J., Escher, A.D.M.A.C. (Eds.) (1998). Признание голосов [Accepting Voices]. Kiev, Sfera. ISBN 9667267369 (in Russian)
- Romme, M.A.J., Escher, A.D.M.A.C. (Eds.). Understanding voices: coping with auditory hallucinations and confusing realities (1996) First published by Rijksuniversiteit Maastricht, the Netherlands and also English edition, Handsell Publications.
- Romme, M.A.J., Escher, A.D.M.A.C. (1997). Stimmen hőren akzeptieren. Psychiatrie-Verlag. Bonn.
- Romme, M.A.J., Escher, A.D.M.A.C. (1997). Na compananhia das voces. Editorial Estampa, Lda., Lisboa Portugal.
- Romme, M.A.J., Escher, A.D.M.A.C. (1997). Moniääniset. Printway Oy, Vantaa. Finland.
- Romme, M.A.J., Escher, A.D.M.A.C. (1999). Omgaan met stemmen horen. Stichting Positieve Gezondheidszorg. Bemelen.
- Romme, M.A.J., Escher, A.D.M.A.C. (1999). Stemmen horen accepteren. Tirion, Baarn.
- Romme, M.A.J., Escher, A.D.M.A.C. (1999). Stimmenhören Akzeptieren, Neunplus 1 Berlin. Duitsland.
- Romme, Marius and Escher, Sandra: Making Sense of Voices - A guide for professionals who work with voice hearers: (2000) MIND Publications
- Romme, M.A.J., Escher, A.D.M.A.C. (2003). Förstå och hantera roster. RSNH. Riksförbundet för Social och Mental Hälsa.Stockholm. Sweden
- Romme, M.A.J., Escher, A.D.M.A.C. (2003). Giv stemmerne mening. Systime Academic. Århus, Denmark.
- Romme, M.A.J., Escher, A.D.M.A.C. (2005). Managing Distressing Voice Hearing Experiences In Wellness Recovery Action Plan. Mary Ellen Copeland edited by Piers Allott. P. Sefton Recovery Group, Liverpool, UK. P. 114–118.
- Escher, A.D.M.A.C. (2005). Making sense of psychotic experiences (PDF). Maastricht University.
- Romme, M.A.J., Escher, A.D.M.A.C. (Eds.) (2013). Psychosis as a Personal Crisis: An Experience-Based Approach. Routledge. ISBN 1136620990

== See also ==
- Hearing Voices Network
- Hearing Voices Movement
- Interpretation of Schizophrenia
- Ross Institute for Psychological Trauma
- Trauma model of mental disorders
- Experience Focussed Counselling
