= Hearing Voices =

Hearing Voices or hearing voices may be:

- Auditory hallucination
- Curse
- Hearing Voices (album), 2001 audio-recording collection by D. Mahler
- Hearing Voices (TV series), US comedy TV series that premiered in 2014
- Hearing Voices Movement, a different way of viewing people who hear voices
