= Biopsychiatry controversy =

Controversy in psychiatry

The biopsychiatry controversy is a dispute over which viewpoint should predominate and form the basis of psychiatric theory and practice. The debate is a criticism of a claimed strict biological view of psychiatric thinking. Its critics include disparate groups such as the antipsychiatry movement and some academics.

== Overview of opposition to biopsychiatry ==
Biological psychiatry or biopsychiatry aims to investigate determinants of mental disorders devising remedial measures of a primarily somatic nature.

This has been criticized by Alvin Pam for being a "stilted, unidimensional, and mechanistic world-view", so that subsequent "research in psychiatry has been geared toward discovering which aberrant genetic or neurophysiological factors underlie and cause social deviance". According to Pam, the "blame the body" approach, which typically offers medication for mental distress, shifts the focus from disturbed behavior in the family to putative biochemical imbalances.

== Research issues ==
=== 2003 status in biopsychiatric research ===
Biopsychiatric research has produced reproducible abnormalities of brain structure and function, as well as a strong genetic component for a number of psychiatric disorders (although the latter has been shown to be correlative rather than causative). It has also elucidated some of the mechanisms of action of medications that effectively treat some of these disorders. Still, by their own admission, this research has not progressed to the stage that they can identify clear biomarkers of these disorders.

Research has shown that serious neurobiological disorders such as schizophrenia reveal reproducible abnormalities of brain structure (such as ventricular enlargement) and function. Compelling evidence exists that disorders including schizophrenia, bipolar disorder, and autism to name a few have a strong genetic component. Still, brain science has not advanced to the point where scientists or clinicians can point to readily discernible pathologic lesions or genetic abnormalities that in and of themselves serve as reliable or predictive biomarkers of a given mental disorder or mental disorders as a group. Ultimately, no gross anatomical lesion such as a tumor may ever be found; rather, mental disorders will likely be proven to represent disorders of intercellular communication; or of disrupted neural circuitry. Research already has elucidated some of the mechanisms of action of medications that are effective for depression, schizophrenia, anxiety, attention deficit, and cognitive disorders such as Alzheimer's disease. These medications clearly exert influence on specific neurotransmitters, naturally occurring brain chemicals that affect, or regulate, communication between neurons in regions of the brain that control mood, complex reasoning, anxiety, and cognition. In 1970, The Nobel Prize was awarded to Julius Axelrod, Ph.D., of the National Institute of Mental Health, for his discovery of how anti-depressant medications regulate the availability of neurotransmitters such as norepinephrine in the synapses, or gaps, between nerve cells.

— American Psychiatric Association, Statement on Diagnosis and Treatment of Mental Disorders

=== Focus on genetic factors ===
Researchers have proposed that most common psychiatric and drug abuse disorders can be traced to a small number of dimensions of genetic risk and reports show significant associations between specific genomic regions and psychiatric disorders. However, to date, only a few genetic lesions have been demonstrated to be mechanistically responsible for psychiatric conditions. For example, one reported finding suggests that in persons diagnosed with schizophrenia as well as in their relatives with chronic psychiatric illnesses, the gene that encodes phosphodiesterase 4B (PDE4B) is disrupted by a balanced translocation.

The reasons for the relative lack of genetic understanding is that the links between genes and mental states defined as abnormal appear highly complex, involve extensive environmental influences, and can be mediated in numerous different ways, for example, by personality, temperament, or life events. Therefore, while twin studies and other research suggest that personality is heritable to some extent, finding the genetic basis for particular personality or temperament traits, and their links to mental health problems, is "at least as hard as the search for genes involved in other complex disorders." Theodore Lidz and The Gene Illusion. argue that biopsychiatrists use genetic terminology in an unscientific way to reinforce their approach. Joseph maintains that biopsychiatrists disproportionately focus on understanding the genetics of those individuals with mental health problems at the expense of addressing the problems of living in the environments of some extremely abusive families or societies.

=== Focus on biochemical factors ===
The chemical imbalance hypothesis states that a chemical imbalance within the brain is the main cause of psychiatric conditions and that these conditions can be improved with medication that corrects this imbalance. In that, emotions within a "normal" spectrum reflect a proper balance of neurotransmitter function. Still, abnormally extreme emotions that are severe enough to impact the daily functioning of patients (as seen in schizophrenia) reflect a profound imbalance. It is the goal of psychiatric intervention, therefore, to regain the homeostasis (via psychopharmacological approaches) that existed before the onset of the disease.

The scientific community has debated this conceptual framework, although no other demonstrably superior hypothesis has emerged. Recently, the biopsychosocial approach to mental illness has been shown to be the most comprehensive and applicable theory in understanding psychiatric disorders. However, there is still much to be discovered in this area of inquiry. As a prime example, while great strides have been made in the field of understanding certain psychiatric disorders (such as schizophrenia), others (such as major depressive disorder) operate via multiple different neurotransmitters and interact in a complex array of systems that are (as yet) not completely understood.

=== Reductionism ===
Niall McLaren emphasizes in his books Humanizing Madness and Humanizing Psychiatry that the major problem with psychiatry is that it lacks a unified model of the mind and has become entrapped in a biological reductionist paradigm. The reasons for this biological shift are intuitive, as reductionism has been very effective in other fields of science and medicine. However, despite reductionism's efficacy in explaining the smallest parts of the brain, this does not explain the mind, which is where he contends the majority of psychopathology stems from. An example would be that every aspect of a computer can be understood scientifically down to the last atom; however, this does not reveal the program that drives this hardware. He also argues that the widespread acceptance of the reductionist paradigm leads to a lack of openness to Self-criticism, "a smugness that stops the very engine of scientific progress." He has proposed his own natural dualist model of the mind, the biocognitive model, which is rooted in the theories of David Chalmers and Alan Turing and does not fall into the "dualist's trap" of spiritualism.

== Economic influences on psychiatric practice ==
American Psychiatric Association president Steven S. Sharfstein, M.D. has stated that when the profit motive of pharmaceutical companies and human good are aligned, the results are mutually beneficial for all: "Pharmaceutical companies have developed and brought to market medications that have transformed the lives of millions of psychiatric patients. The proven effectiveness of antidepressant, mood-stabilizing, and antipsychotic medications has helped sensitize the public to the reality of mental illness and taught them that treatment works. In this way, Big Pharma has helped reduce stigma associated with psychiatric treatment and with psychiatrists." However, Sharfstein acknowledged that the goals of individual physicians who deliver direct patient care can be different from the pharmaceutical and medical device industry. Conflicts arising from this disparity raise natural concerns in this regard including:

- a "broken health care system" that allows "many patients [to be] prescribed the wrong drugs or drugs they don't need";
- "medical education opportunities sponsored by pharmaceutical companies [that] are often biased toward one product or another";
- "[d]irect marketing to consumers [that] also leads to increased demand for medications and inflates expectations about the benefits of medications";
- "drug companies [paying] physicians to allow company reps to sit in on patient sessions to learn more about care for patients."

Nevertheless, Sharfstein acknowledged that without pharmaceutical companies developing and producing modern medicines - virtually every medical specialty would have few (if any) treatments for the patients that they care for.

=== Pharmaceutical industry influences in psychiatry ===
Studies have shown that promotional marketing by pharmaceutical and other companies has the potential to influence physicians' decision making. Pharmaceutical manufacturers (and other advocates) would argue that in today's modern world, physicians simply do not have the time to continually update their knowledge base on the status of the latest research; that by providing educational materials for both physicians and patients, they are providing an educational perspective; and that it is up to the individual physician to decide what treatment is best for their patients. has been replaced by educationally-based activities that became the basis for the legal and industry reforms involving physician gifts, influence in graduate medical education, physician disclosure of conflicts of interest, and other promotional activities.

In an essay on the effect of advertisements on sales for marketed anti-depressants, evidence showed that both patients and physicians can be influenced by media advertisements, and that this influence has the possibility of increasing the frequency of certain medicines being prescribed over others.

== See also ==
=== General ===
- Anti-psychiatry – A movement critiquing psychiatry from a human rights perspective.
- Bipolar disorders research – biopsychiatric analysis into the cause of bipolar disorders.
- Elliott Valenstein – a psychologist and neuroscientist, author of Blaming the Brain.
- The Gene Illusion – a book by clinical psychologist Jay Joseph.
- Causes of schizophrenia
- Controversy about ADHD
- A Brief History of Anxiety (Yours & Mine), a book by journalist Patricia Pearson
- Trauma model of mental disorders
- Interpretation of Schizophrenia – Award-winning book by Silvano Arieti, which sets forth demonstrative evidence of a psychological etiology for schizophrenia.

=== Groups critical of the biomedical paradigm ===
- Mindfreedom – A group that advocates "choice" regarding psychopharmaceuticals.
- ICSPP (International Center for the Study of Psychiatry and Psychology)
- ISPS (International Society for Psychological and Social Approaches to Psychoses)
- CEP (Council for Evidence-based Psychiatry)
