= Theodore Lidz =

American psychiatrist

Theodore Lidz (1 April 1910 – 16 February 2001) was an American psychiatrist best known for his articles and books on the causes of schizophrenia and on psychotherapy with patients with schizophrenia. An advocate of research into environmental causes of mental illness, Lidz was a notable critic of what he saw as a disproportionate focus on biological psychiatry. Lidz was a Sterling Professor of Psychiatry at Yale University. In his lifetime, he did a great amount of research on interpersonal causes of schizophrenia.

== Biography ==
Born in New York City and raised on Long Island, the son of Israel Isador Lidz, president of a button and novelties firm in Manhattan, and Esther Shedlinsky. Lidz attended Columbia College and the Columbia University College of Physicians and Surgeons. After two years of medical internship at Yale-New Haven Hospital, he became an assistant in neurology at National Hospital, Queen's Square in London. He took his residency in psychiatry at Johns Hopkins University. It was while studying there with Adolf Meyer that Lidz learned to examine personal history and experience as sources of psychotic as well as neurotic disorders.

During his residency, Lidz met Ruth Maria Wilmanns, a German-born psychiatrist who had fled the Nazi regime in 1934 and arrived at Johns Hopkins in 1937. They were married in 1939, and they shared their professional interests in psychiatry as well as a love of art until her death in 1995.

In January 1942, Lidz enlisted in the Army and served in New Zealand, Fiji and Burma. In Fiji, as the hospital's only psychiatrist, he had several hundred psychiatric casualties from Guadalcanal in his personal care.

Returning to Johns Hopkins in 1946, he became chief of the psychiatric section of the Department of Medicine and initiated research on psychosomatic conditions. At the same time, he followed Ruth Lidz into psychoanalytic training in the Washington-Baltimore Institute, where they studied with Harry Stack Sullivan and Frieda Fromm-Reichmann. With Ruth Lidz, he conducted a study of psychiatric troubles among parents of patients hospitalized for schizophrenia. The resulting article documented a high rate of psychiatric disturbance, although not of schizophrenia itself, among the parents (reference cited below). The paper provided the starting point for Lidz's later studies.

In 1951, Lidz moved to Yale as professor and chief of clinical services in psychiatry and to build the Department of Psychiatry. With Stephen Fleck and other collaborators, he launched a long-term study comparing 17 patients with schizophrenia and their families with 17 non-schizophrenic hospitalized patients and their families. By the late 1950s, the research group published the first of many articles on parental relationships associated with the emergence of schizophrenia in young adults (reference cited below).

Lidz's perspective in psychiatry emphasized continuities between normal development and psychopathology. To try to develop a better understanding of his patients, he focused on familial, community and cultural factors that affect the development of personality as well as the individual's life history. He believed that mental illness is induced by early experience in profoundly troubled families.

Lidz did not consider schizophrenia to be a disease or an illness. He considered it to be a personality disorder which was a reaction to a sick organization. As psychiatric research on the causes of schizophrenia turned to patterns of genetic inheritance and functions of neurotransmitters, Lidz argued that family approaches remained more helpful to treatment and fought the classification of schizophrenia as an incurable, lifelong condition. He studied the creativity of many artists, religious leaders and even scientists who had schizophrenia for periods in their lives. While acknowledging that contemporary medications often alleviate some symptoms of schizophrenia, he emphasized the successes that he and others had achieved with psychotherapy. He viewed the common failure to offer long-term psychotherapy as a betrayal of patients with schizophrenia.

According to an interview, Lidz explained two hypotheses on how schizophrenic reactions are more common in lower socio-economic classes. One hypothesis suggests the occurrence of schizophrenia is similar to that of broken homes, or when family life is disturbed, which can take along many different forms. The other hypothesis, which has an unknown cause, is the capacity to think in minimal-educated families where the children in these families are more likely to have schizophrenic reactions.

In their book, Schizophrenia and the Family (1965), Lidz, Fleck and Alice Cornelison compiled findings of what remains perhaps the most detailed clinical study of a series of patients with schizophrenia and their families.

On a 1970 trip to Fiji, the battlefields of Guadalcanal and New Guinea, Lidz studied patients from radically different cultural backgrounds and collected indigenous artifacts. Publications followed on the significance of paranoia when supported by beliefs in black magic and on personality development in the context of New Guinean culture. Some years later, the Lidzes donated their collection of New Guinean artifacts to the Peabody Museum of Natural History at Yale.

Although formally retired in 1978, Lidz continued to treat patients, lecture and publish into the mid-1990s. In his latter years, he expressed regret that he could not write one more book to argue that biology-based lines of research and training in current psychiatry are, as he said, "barking up the wrong tree."

His textbook The Person has been widely used in courses on personality development at schools of medicine, nursing and social work, and in graduate programs in psychology.

Theodore Lidz died in 2001 at the age of 90 in his home in Hamden, Connecticut.

== Schizophrenogenic parents ==
In the books Schizophrenia and the Family and The Origin and Treatment of Schizophrenic Disorders Lidz and his colleagues explain their belief that parental behaviour can result in mental illness in children:

Lidz's general thesis examined how the socialization between parents affect the aetiology of schizophrenia in their children. Lidz explained his belief that a child's inability to achieve independence and develop a sufficient ego identity and a child's incapacity for intimacy were due to the defective interactions between the child's parents.

In [such] families the parents were rarely in overt disagreement, and the family settings were reasonably calm. But, as we studied these seemingly harmonious families, it became apparent that they provided a profoundly distorted and distorting milieu because one spouse passively acceded to the strange and even bizarre concepts of the more dominant spouse concerning child rearing and how a family should live together. We termed the seemingly harmonious ones as “skewed”.

Lidz illustrates his point with the “skewed” N. family. When he interviewed Mr. and Mrs. N., Mrs. N. dominated the interviews even when the questions were directed expressly to her husband. Though very efficient in his profession, Mr. N. felt he did not know anything about how to raise the children and relegated all judgment on family affairs to his wife. But his behavior transcended mere passivity. Dr. Lidz observed that Mr. N. behaved as a spokesman of his wife; he paraphrased her demands and questions. His wife “tended to treat him as a child”. Lidz concludes:

Mrs. N. was clearly a very difficult and disturbed woman who despite her fluid self-boundaries [...] seemed to retain a tenuous balance by imposing her view of the world upon the few persons significant to her, and by keeping her life and her family life confined within the narrow limits she could navigate.

Lidz noted that schizophrenogenic mothers manage to be impervious to the needs and wishes of other family members. “As her psychotic or very strange concepts remain unchallenged by the husband, they create reality within the family”. Dr. Lidz calls this phenomenon folie à deux (dual madness), a shared delusion between two parents. And if the delusional ideas of the dominant parent are shared by all family members, the result is a folie en famille (family madness).

Lidz criticised a culture of blame against schizophrenogenic mothers, however, writing:

I also find it very distressing that because the parents’ attitudes and interactions are important determinants of schizophrenic disorders, some therapists and family caseworkers treat parents as villains who have ruined the lives of their patients.

== Ethics ==
In his professional career, Theodore Lidz objected to the overuse and often misuse of shock treatment, chemotherapy and surgery in the treatment of schizophrenia, believing that such methods had no place except in an "extraordinary condition".

"...I think surgery has no place except maybe in some extraordinary condition, I don't think we know enough about lobotomy to say with perfect certainty. In the department as a whole, I don't think there have been any in the 20 years I have been here. Shock treatment may have some value in acute disturbances where the patient is apt to injure himself and nobody can make contact, but this is a rare occurrence." (Lidz, 1971)

Lidz's most beneficial contribution to modern day psychiatric practice may be his application of psychotherapeutic skills in the social management of schizophrenia.

== See also ==
- Silvano Arieti
- R.D. Laing
- Lloyd deMause
- Alice Miller
- Stephen Fleck
- Anti-psychiatry
- Trauma model of mental disorders
- Interpretation of Schizophrenia
