= Elliot Valenstein =

American psychologist (1923–2023)

- Born: Elliot Spiro Valenstein; December 9, 1923; New York City, U.S.
- Died: January 12, 2023 (aged 99); Ann Arbor, Michigan, U.S.
- Occupation(s): Neuroscientist, psychologist

Elliot Spiro Valenstein (December 9, 1923 – January 12, 2023) was an American psychologist who was professor of psychology and neuroscience at the University of Michigan. He was an authority on brain stimulation, psychosurgery and the history of psychiatry.

== Biography ==
Valenstein was born in New York City on December 9, 1923, to Louis and Helen Valenstein (formally Spiro). He fought in World War II. After returning from the war he attended City College of New York for his B.S. and University of Kansas for his M.A and PhD.

Valenstein was the chief of the neuropsychology section at Walter Reed Institute Research from 1957 to 1961. He started teaching at University of Michigan in 1970.

Valenstein was married to Thelma Lewis from 1947 until her death on December 13, 2020. They have two children together; Paul and Carl. Valenstein died in Ann Arbor, Michigan, on January 12, 2023, at the age of 99.

== Published books ==
- Brain Control: A Critical Examination of Brain Stimulation and Psychosurgery (1973)
- Brain Stimulation and Motivation: Research and Commentary (Ed.) (1973)
- Great and Desperate Cures: The Rise and Decline of psychosurgery and other Radical Treatments for Mental Illness (1986), ISBN 0465027113
- Blaming the Brain: The Truth About Drugs and Mental Health (1998)
- The War of the Soups and the Sparks: The Discovery of Neurotransmitters and the Dispute over how Nerves Communicate (2005)

== See also ==
- Biopsychiatry controversy
- Chemical imbalance theory
- Psychiatric drugs
