= Hearing Voices Movement =

Movement supporting people who hear voices

The Hearing Voices Movement (HVM) is an international grassroots initiative composed of individuals and organizations who promote the hearing voices approach—a framework for understanding the experience of hearing voices. While mainstream psychiatry typically refers to such experiences as auditory verbal hallucinations, the movement uses the term hearing voices, which it argues is more accurate and respectful.

The movement originated in the Netherlands in the late 1980s through the collaboration between voice-hearer Patsy Hage, psychiatrist Marius Romme and researcher Sandra Escher.

HVM regards hearing voices as a meaningful, though sometimes distressing, human experience that can be explored and understood. It supports the creation of hearing voices groups, peer-led spaces where individuals can share and make sense of their experiences.

Rather than treating voice-hearing as a symptom of mental illness, HVM emphasizes approaches grounded in human rights, social justice, diversity and collective empowerment. It challenges the dominance of the medical model in psychiatry and questions the validity of diagnostic categories such as schizophrenia.

== History ==
The Hearing Voices Movement originated in the Netherlands in the late 1980s through the collaboration of voice-hearer Patsy Hage, psychiatrist Marius Romme, and researcher Sandra Escher. HVM was formally established in 1987 with the founding of the first national Hearing Voices Network in the Netherlands, Stichting Weerklank, following a meeting organized by Escher and Romme. In 1988, a group was formed in Manchester by voice-hearer Louise Pembroke and community worker Paul Baker. After receiving media attention in 1990, this developed into a national UK network.

Following this, more national networks were formed, including in Austria (1992), Finland and Japan (1996), Germany (1998), Palestine (2001), US (2010), and Uganda (2012). In 1997, the organisation Intervoice was established to support and connect hearing voices networks and initiatives worldwide. In 2009, the first World Hearing Voices Congress was held in Maastricht, Netherlands.

The Melbourne Hearing Voices Declaration was launched at the World Hearing Voices Congress in 2013. It promotes the hearing voices approach as a rights-based alternative within mental health care. This was followed by the Thessaloniki Declaration in 2014.

== Tenets ==
At its core, the Hearing Voices Movement proposes that hearing voices is a meaningful human experience. Rather than seeking to eliminate voices, the movement emphasizes the importance of allowing individuals to make sense of their voices on their own terms.

HVM uses hearing voices as an umbrella term that also includes seeing visions and other sensory experiences such as touch, taste, and smell. The movement views these experiences as an aspect of human difference, rather than a mental health problem.

The principles of the movement closely align with the recovery model, emphasizing empowerment and human rights, and promoting holistic approaches to address problematic and overwhelming voices.

Since many people live successfully with their voices, voices themselves are not viewed as the problem. Instead, the relationship between a person and their voices is considered a central issue. Research has found that people who hear voices can be helped using methods such as mindfulness-based interventions, voice dialoguing cognitive behaviour therapy (CBT) and self-help methods. HVM offers guidance to mental health practitioners to assist people who hear voices and may feel overwhelmed by the experience.

HVM takes a critical stance toward the medical model of disability and expresses concern about an exclusive reliance on medication as treatment. They highlight that service users are sometimes discouraged from talking about their voices as these are seen solely as symptoms of psychiatric illness. Historical and anthropological critiques are referenced to illustrate how experiences like voice-hearing have been culturally devalued. In Voices of Reason, Voices of Insanity, Leudar and Thomas review nearly 3,000 years of voice-hearing history. They argue that the western world has moved the experience of hearing voices from a socially valued context to a pathologised and denigrated one. Foucault has argued that this process can arise when a minority perspective is at odds with dominant social norms and beliefs.

The position of the hearing voices movement can be summarised as:

- Hearing voices is not in itself a sign of mental illness.
- Hearing voices is part of the diversity of being a human, it is a faculty that is common (3-10% of the population will hear a voice or voices in their lifetime) and significant.
- Hearing voices is experienced by many people who do not have symptoms that would lead to diagnosis of mental illness.
- If hearing voices causes distress, the person who hears the voices can learn strategies to cope with the experience.
- Coping is often achieved by confronting past problems that lie behind the experience.

=== Theoretical overview ===
The work of Marius Romme, Sandra Escher and other researchers provides a theoretical framework for the movement. They find that:

1. Not everyone who hears voices becomes a patient. Over a third of 400 voice hearers in the Netherlands they studied had not had any contact with psychiatric services. These people either described themselves as being able to cope with their voices and/or described their voices as life enhancing.
2. Demographic (epidemiological) research provides evidence that there are people who hear voices in the general population (2%-6%) who are not necessarily troubled by them. Only a small minority fulfill the criteria for a psychiatric diagnosis and, of those, only a few seek psychiatric aid indicating that hearing voices in itself is not necessarily a symptom of an illness. Even more (about 8%) have peculiar delusions and do so without being ill.
3. People who cope well with their voices and those who did not, show clear differences in terms of the nature of the relationship they had with their voices.
4. People who live well with their voice experience use different strategies to manage their voices than those voice hearers who are overwhelmed by them.
5. 70% of voice hearers reported that their voices had begun after a severe traumatic or intensely emotional event such as an accident, divorce or bereavement, sexual or physical abuse, love affairs, or pregnancy. Romme and colleagues found that the onset of voice hearing amongst a patient group was often preceded by either a traumatic event or an event that activated the memory of an earlier trauma.
6. Specifically, there is a high correlation between voice hearing and abuse. These findings are being substantiated further in on-going studies with voice hearing amongst children.
7. Some people who hear voices have a deep need to construct a personal understanding for their experiences and to talk to others about it without being designated as mad.

== Intervoice ==
Intervoice (The International Network for Training, Education and Research into Hearing Voices) is an international organization that coordinates and supports initiatives within the global Hearing Voices Movement. It supports and connects "experts by experience" (voice hearers) and "experts by profession" (mental health workers, academics, activists).

Intervoice was founded in 1997 during a meeting in Maastricht, Netherlands. In 2007, it was incorporated under UK law as a non-profit organisation and charity, operating under the name International Hearing Voices Projects Ltd. Its governing body includes both voice hearers and mental health practitioners.

== Activities ==
=== Hearing voices groups ===
Hearing voices groups are based on an ethos of self-help, mutual respect and empathy. They provide a safe space for people to share their experiences and to support one another. They are peer support groups, involving social support and belonging, not necessarily therapy or treatment. Groups offer an opportunity for people to accept and live with their experiences in a way that helps them regain some power over their lives. There are hundreds of hearing voices groups and networks across the world. In 2014 there were more than 180 groups in the UK. These include groups for young people, people in prison, women and people from Black and Minority Ethnic communities.

=== World Hearing Voices Congress ===
Intervoice hosts the annual World Hearing Voices Congress. In 2015 the 7th Congress was held in Madrid, Spain, the 2016 Congress will be held in Paris, France. Previous conferences have been held in Maastricht, Netherlands, (2009); Nottingham, England (2010), Savona, Italy (2011), Cardiff, Wales (2012); Melbourne, Australia (2013); Thessaloniki, Greece (2014); Madrid, Spain (2015).

=== Annual World Hearing Voices Day ===
This is held on 14 September and celebrates hearing voices as part of the diversity of human experience, It seeks to increase awareness of the fact that you can hear voices and be healthy. It also challenges the negative attitudes towards people who hear voices and the assumption that hearing voices, in itself, is a sign of mental illness.

=== Research ===
Intervoice has an international research committee, that commissions research, encourages and supports exchanges and visits between member countries, the translation and publication of books and other literature on the subject of hearing voices and other related extraordinary experiences.

== Relationship to psychiatry ==
HVMs relationship with psychiatry is characterized by both critique and collaboration. While some clinicians see HVM as a valuable complement to traditional psychiatry, and certain services adopting HVM-inspired methods—such as the Maastricht Interview and voice dialogue techniques—there remain points of contention.

In some psychiatric settings, hearing voices groups are implemented as part of care, facilitated by peers and mental health professionals.

HVM promotes the idea that hearing voices can be a meaningful experience, which some critics feel might invalidate suffering, and could lead individuals to avoid treatment. In response, HVM supporters have argued that they do not deny the challenges and distress experienced by some voice-hearers, but rather emphasize that learning to understand and relate to one's voices can be a valuable tool for people in crisis.

Some critics argue that HVM downplay the role of medications such as antipsychotics, potentially neglecting those needing more structured clinical support. In response, HVM refers to research showing its approach can help in severe crises, as suppressing voices using medication and other interventions is not always effective. Supporters maintain that the movement does not oppose medication, but emphasizes the importance of informed choice and supporting individuals in "using many different means that are helpful to them in dealing with their voices." This can include medical care.

In a 2017 article in the Psychiatric Times, Professor of Psychiatry Ronald Pies cautions against "simplistic theories on both sides of the ideological divide".

A 2021 survey found a majority of NHS professionals positive about hearing voices groups, but many expressed uncertainty about the evidence. HVM largely focuses on social support rather than clinical outcomes, making standard evaluation methods difficult—but proponents have highlighted that qualitative reports support the value of the approach.

== See also ==
- Auditory hallucination
- Critical Psychiatry Network
- Diagnosis of schizophrenia
- Hearing Voices Network
- Interpretation of Schizophrenia
- Jesus Christ
- Neurodiversity
- Peer support
- Psychiatric survivors movement
- Recovery approach
- Self-help groups for mental health
- Trauma model of mental disorders

== Bibliography ==
- Beavan, Vanessa; Read, John; Cartwright, Claire (June 2011). "The prevalence of voice-hearers in the general population: a literature review". Journal of Mental Health. 20 (3): 281–292. doi:10.3109/09638237.2011.562262. PMID 21574793. S2CID 207498701.
- Bergner, Daniel (2022). The Mind and the Moon: My Brother's Story, the Science of Our Brains, and the Search for Our Psyches. Ecco. ISBN 978-0-06-300489-4.
- Blackman, Lisa (2001). Hearing voices: embodiment and experience. London New York: Free Association Books. ISBN 978-1-85343-533-1.
- Coleman, Ron; Smith, Mike (2005) [1997]. Working with voices: victim to victor. Newton-le-Willows, Merseyside: Handsell. ISBN 978-0-9548103-4-4.
- Haddock, Gillian; Bentall, Richard P.; Slade, Peter D. (1996). "Psychological treatments for auditory hallucinations, focussing or distraction?". In Haddock, Gillian; Slade, Peter D. (eds.). Cognitive-behavioural interventions with psychotic disorders. London: Routledge. pp. 45–71. ISBN 978-0-415-10290-2.
- Heery, Myrtle W. (1989). "Inner voice experiences: an exploratory study of thirty cases" (PDF). Journal of Transpersonal Psychology. 21 (1): 73–82.
- Holmes, Doug (1998). Hearing voices: Hillary, Angels, and O.J. to the voice-producing brain. Rileyville, Virginia: Shenandoah Psychology Press. ISBN 978-0-9663973-7-6.
- James, Adam (2001). Raising our voices: an account of the hearing voices movement. Handsell Publishing. ISBN 978-1-903199-13-8.
- Luhrmann, T. M.; Padmavati, R.; Tharoor, H.; Osei, A. (2015). "Differences in voice-hearing experiences of people with psychosis in the USA, India and Ghana: Interview-based study". The British Journal of Psychiatry. 206 (1). Cambridge University Press: 41–44. doi:10.1192/bjp.bp.113.139048. PMID 24970772.
- Leudar, Ivan; Thomas, Philip (2000). Voices of reason, voices of insanity: studies of verbal hallucinations. London New York: Psychology Press. ISBN 978-0-415-14786-6.
- Longden, Eleanor (2013). Learning from the voices in my head. Cambridge: TED Books.
- McCarthy-Jones, Simon (2012). Hearing voices: the histories, causes, and meanings of auditory verbal hallucinations. Cambridge: Cambridge University Press. ISBN 978-1-139-01753-4.
- Romme, Marius A.J. (2011). "Accepting and making sense of voices: a recovery-focused therapy plan". In Romme, Marius A.J.; Escher, Sandra D. (eds.). Psychosis as a personal crisis: an experience based approach. Hove, East Sussex New York, New York: Routledge for The International Society for the Psychological Treatments of the Schizophrenias and other pychoses (ISPS). pp. 153–165. ISBN 978-0-415-67330-3.
- Romme, Marius A.J.; Escher, Sandra D. (2011). Psychosis as a personal crisis: an experience based approach. Hove, East Sussex New York, New York: Routledge for The International Society for the Psychological Treatments of the Schizophrenias and other pychoses (ISPS). pp. 129–139. ISBN 978-0-415-67330-3.
- Romme, Marius A.J.; Escher, Sandra D. (2010). Children hearing voices: what you need to know and what you can do. Ross-on-Wye, Herefordshire, UK: Pccs Books. ISBN 978-1-906254-35-3.
- Romme, Marius A.J.; Escher, Sandra D.; Dillon, Jacqui; Corstens, Dirk; Morris, Mervyn (2009). Living with voices: 50 stories of recovery. Herefordshire: PCCS Books in association with Birmingham City University. ISBN 978-1-906254-22-3.
- Romme, Marius A.J.; Escher, Sandra D. (2000). Making sense of voices: the mental health professional's guide to working with voice-hearers. London: Mind Publications. ISBN 978-1-874690-86-3.
- Romme, Marius A.J.; Escher, Sandra D. (1996). "Empowering people who hear voices". In Haddock, Gillian; Slade, Peter D. (eds.). Cognitive-behavioural interventions with psychotic disorders. London: Routledge. pp. 137–150. ISBN 978-0-415-10290-2.
- Romme, Marius A.J. (1996). Understanding voices: coping with auditory hallucinations and confusing realities. Runcorn, Cheshire: Handsell Publications. ISBN 978-90-72551-09-2.

Also published by Rijksuniversiteit Maastricht in the Netherlands.

- Romme, Marius A.J.; Escher, Sandra D. (1992). Accepting voices. London: Mind Publications. ISBN 978-1-874690-13-9.
- Watkins, John (2008) [1998]. Hearing voices: a common human experience. Melbourne, Victoria: Michelle Anderson Publishing. ISBN 978-0-85572-390-3.

Voice Hearing and Life Events

- Andrew, Elizabeth Marie; Gray, Nicola S.; Snowden, Robert (October 2008). "The relationship between trauma and beliefs about hearing voices: a study of psychiatric and non-psychiatric voice hearers" (PDF). Psychological Medicine. 38 (10): 1409–1417. doi:10.1017/S003329170700253X. PMID 18177529. S2CID 6181173.
- Honig, Adriaan; Romme, Marius A.J.; Ensink, Bernadine J.; Escher, Sandra D.; Pennings, Monique H.A.; deVries, Marten W. (October 1998). "Auditory hallucinations: a comparison between patients and nonpatients". Journal of Nervous and Mental Disease. 186 (10): 646–651. doi:10.1097/00005053-199810000-00009. PMID 9788642.
- Moskowitz, Andrew; Corstens, Dirk (January 2008). "Auditory hallucinations: psychotic symptom or dissociative experience?". Journal of Psychological Trauma. 6 (2–3): 35–63. doi:10.1300/J513v06n02_04. S2CID 145290175.
- Read, John; van Os, Jim; Morrison, Anthony P.; Ross, Colin A. (November 2005). "Childhood trauma, psychosis and schizophrenia: a literature review with theoretical and clinical implications". Acta Psychiatrica Scandinavica. 112 (5): 330–350. doi:10.1111/j.1600-0447.2005.00634.x. PMID 16223421. S2CID 5324960.
- Shevlin, Mark; Murphy, Jamie; Read, John; Mallett, John; Adamson, Gary; Houston, James Edward (December 2011). "Childhood adversity and hallucinations: a community-based study using the National Comorbidity Survey Replication". Social Psychiatry and Psychiatric Epidemiology. 46 (12): 1203–1210. doi:10.1007/s00127-010-0296-x. PMID 20931325. S2CID 22512253.
- Whitfield, Charles L.; Dube, Shanta R.; Felitti, Vincent J.; Anda, Robert F. (July 2005). "Adverse childhood experiences and hallucinations" (PDF). Child Abuse and Neglect. 29 (7): 797–810. doi:10.1016/j.chiabu.2005.01.004. PMID 16051353.

Working With Voices

- Beavan, Vanessa; Read, John (March 2010). "Hearing voices and listening to what they say: the importance of voice content in understanding and working with distressing voices". Journal of Nervous and Mental Disease. 198 (3): 201–205. doi:10.1097/NMD.0b013e3181d14612. PMID 20215997. S2CID 966759.
- Corstens, Dirk; Longden, Eleanor; May, Rufus (June 2012). "Talking with voices: exploring what is expressed by the voices people hear". Psychosis. 4 (2): 95–104. doi:10.1080/17522439.2011.571705. S2CID 145640302.
- Longden, Eleanor; Corstens, Dirk; Escher, Sandra D.; Romme, Marius A.J. (October 2012). "Voice hearing in biographical context: a model for formulating the relationship between voices and life history". Psychosis. 4 (3): 224–234. doi:10.1080/17522439.2011.596566. S2CID 143911912.
- Romme, Marius A.J.; Morris, Mervyn (October 2013). "The recovery process with hearing voices: accepting as well as exploring their emotional background through a supported process". Psychosis: Psychological, Social and Integrative Approaches. 5 (3): 259–269. doi:10.1080/17522439.2013.830641. S2CID 144639561.
- Stainsby, Matt; Sapochnik, Manuela; Bledin, Ken; Mason, Oliver J. (February 2010). "Are attitudes and beliefs about symptoms more important than symptom severity in recovery from psychosis?". Psychosis. 2 (1): 41–49. doi:10.1080/17522430903144386. S2CID 143419210.

Hearing Voices Groups

- Dillon, Jacqui; Hornstein, Gail A. (October 2013). "Hearing voices peer support groups: a powerful alternative for people in distress". Psychosis: Psychological, Social and Integrative Approaches. 5 (3): 286–295. doi:10.1080/17522439.2013.843020. S2CID 143027320.
- Dillon, Jacqui; Longden, Eleanor (2011). "Hearing voices groups: creating safe spaces to share taboo experiences". In Romme, Marius A.J.; Escher, Sandra D. (eds.). Psychosis as a personal crisis: an experience based approach. Hove, East Sussex New York, New York: Routledge for The International Society for the Psychological Treatments of the Schizophrenias and other pychoses (ISPS). pp. 129–139. ISBN 978-0-415-67330-3.
- May, Rufus; Longden, Eleanor (2010). "Self-help approaches to hearing voices". In Larøi, Frank; Aleman, André (eds.). Hallucinations: a guide to treatment and management. Oxford, UK: Oxford University Press. ISBN 978-0-19-954859-0.
