= Alvin Pam =

American psychologist

Alvin Pam is an American psychologist and author who was formerly the director of Psychiatry at the Bronx Psychiatric Center in the Bronx, New York City, New York. He also formerly served as a clinical professor at the Albert Einstein College of Medicine. With Colin A. Ross, he was the co-author and co-editor of the 1995 book Pseudoscience in Biological Psychiatry: Blaming the body, which harshly criticizes the field of biological psychiatry and its assumptions.

== Career ==
While working at the Bronx Psychiatric Center, Pam read Jay Neugeboren's book Imagining Robert, which convinced him to try to treat Neugeboren's brother Robert, about whom the book was written. Pam disagreed with the consensus of the center's staff that Robert could never live on his own. Shortly after Robert arrived at the Bronx Psychiatric Center in 1998, Pam told Jay that, shortly after starting to take atypical antipsychotic medications, his brother was suddenly ready to be released. Jay later credited Pam, among others, with allowing Robert to live without a psychiatric recurrence for over six years, "the longest stretch in his adult life."
