= Critical Psychiatry Network =

Psychiatric organization based in the United Kingdom

The Critical Psychiatry Network (CPN) is a group of psychiatrists who advocate for reform towards a more reflective, skeptical and patient-centered approach to psychiatry. CPN was created in January 1999 by psychiatrists in the United Kingdom, in response to proposals by the British government to amend the Mental Health Act 1983. The network was concerned about the potential for increased coercion in the act. Among their founders was Joanna Moncrieff, current co-chair of the network.

Critical psychiatry may be contrasted with anti-psychiatry, which is more abolitionist than reformative.

Participants in the Critical Psychiatry Network share concerns about psychiatric practice where and when it is heavily dependent upon diagnostic classification and the use of psychopharmacology. These concerns reflect their recognition of poor construct validity amongst psychiatric diagnoses and scepticism about the efficacy of anti-depressants, mood stabilisers and anti-psychotic agents. According to them, these concerns have ramifications in the area of the use of psychiatric diagnosis to justify civil detention and the role of scientific knowledge in psychiatry, and an interest in promoting the study of interpersonal phenomena such as relationship, meaning and narrative in pursuit of better understanding and improved treatment.

CPN has similarities and contrasts with earlier criticisms of conventional psychiatric practice, for example those associated with David Cooper, R. D. Laing and Thomas Szasz. Features of CPN are pragmatism and full acknowledgment of the suffering commonly associated with mental health difficulties. As a result, it functions primarily as a forum within which practitioners can share experiences of practice, and provide support and encouragement in developing improvements in mainstream NHS practice where most participants are employed.

CPN maintains close links with service user or survivor led organisations such as the Hearing Voices Network, Intervoice and the Soteria Network, and with like-minded psychiatrists in other countries. It maintains its own website. The network is open to any sympathetic psychiatrist. Members meet in person, in the UK, twice a year. It is primarily intended for psychiatrists and psychiatric trainees and full participation is not available to other groups.

== Coercion and social control ==
The other involved the introduction of community treatment orders (CTOs) to make it possible to treat people against their wishes in the community. CPN submitted evidence to the Scoping Group set up by the government under Professor Genevra Richardson. This set out ethical and practical objections to CTOs, and ethical and human rights objections to the idea of reviewable detention. It was also critical of the concept of personality disorder as a diagnosis in psychiatry. In addition, CPN's evidence called for the use of advance statements, crisis cards and a statutory right to independent advocacy as ways of helping to sustain autonomy at times of crisis. CPN also responded to government consultation on the proposed amendment, and the white paper.

The concern about these proposals caused a number of organizations to come together under the umbrella of the Mental Health Alliance to campaign in support of the protection of patients' and carers' rights, and to minimise coercion. CPN joined the Alliance's campaign, but resigned in 2005 when it became clear that the Alliance would accept those aspects of the House of Commons Scrutiny Committee's report that would result in the introduction of CTOs. Psychiatrists not identified with CPN shared the Network's concern about the more coercive aspects of the government's proposals, so CPN carried out a questionnaire survey of over two and a half thousand (2,500) consultant psychiatrists working in England seeking their views of the proposed changes. The responses (a response rate of 46%) indicated widespread concern in the profession about reviewable detention and CTOs.

The CPN was paid attention by Thomas Szasz who wrote: "Members of the CPN, like their American counterparts, criticize the proliferation of psychiatric diagnoses and 'excessive' use of psychotropic drugs, but embrace psychiatric coercions."

=== The role of scientific knowledge in psychiatry ===
There is a strong view by CPN that contemporary psychiatry relies too much on the medical model, and attaches too much importance to a narrow biomedical view of diagnosis. This can, in part, be understood as the response of an earlier generation of psychiatrists to the challenge of what has been called 'anti-psychiatry'. Psychiatrists such as David Cooper, R. D. Laing and Thomas Szasz (although the latter two rejected the term) were identified as part of a movement against psychiatry in the 1960s and 1970s. Stung by these attacks, as well as accusations that in any case psychiatrists could not even agree who was and who was not mentally ill, academic psychiatrists responded by stressing the biological and scientific basis of psychiatry through strenuous efforts to improve the reliability of psychiatric diagnosis based in a return to the traditions of one of the founding fathers of the profession, Emil Kraepelin.

The use of standardized diagnostic criteria and checklists may have improved the reliability of psychiatric diagnosis, but the problem of its validity remains. The investment of huge sums of money in Britain, America and Europe over the last half-century has failed to reveal a single, replicable difference between a person with a diagnosis of schizophrenia and someone who does not have the diagnosis. The case for the biological basis of common psychiatric disorders such as depression has also been greatly over-stated. This has a number of consequences:

First, the aggrandisement of biological research creates a false impression both inside and outside the profession of the credibility of the evidence used to justify drug treatments for disorders such as depression and schizophrenia. Reading clinical practice guidelines for the treatment of depression, for example, such as that produced for the UK National Health Service by the National Institute for Health and Clinical Excellence (NICE), one might be fooled into believing that the evidence for the efficacy of selective serotonin reuptake inhibitors (SSRIs) is established beyond question. In reality this is not the case, as re-examinations of drug trial data in meta-analyses, especially where unpublished data are included (publication bias means that researchers and drug companies do not publish negative findings for obvious commercial reasons), have revealed that most of the benefits seen in active treatment groups are also seen in the placebo groups.

As far as schizophrenia is concerned, neuroleptic drugs may have some short-term effects, but it is not the case that these drugs possess specific 'anti-psychotic' properties, and it is impossible to assess whether or not they confer advantages in long-term management of psychoses because of the severe disturbances that occur when people on long-term active treatment are withdrawn to placebos. These disturbances are traditionally interpreted as a 'relapse' of schizophrenia when in fact there are several possible interpretations for the phenomenon.

Another consequence of the domination of psychiatry by biological science is that the importance of contexts in understanding distress and madness is played down. This has a number of consequences. First, it obscures the true nature of what in fact are extremely complex problems. For example, if we consider depression to be a biological disorder remediable through the use of antidepressant tablets, then we may be excused from having to delve into the tragic circumstances that so often lie at the heart the experience. This is so in adults and children.

=== Meaning and experience in psychiatry ===
There is a common theme, here, with the work of David Ingleby whose chapter in Critical Psychiatry: The Politics of Mental Health sets out a detailed critique of positivism (the view that epistemology, or knowledge about the world is best served by empiricism and the scientific method rather than metaphysics). A common theme running through Laingian antipsychiatry, Ingleby's critical psychiatry, contemporary critical psychiatry and postpsychiatry is the view that social, political and cultural realities play a vital role in helping us to understand the suffering and experience of madness. Like Laing, Ingleby stressed the importance of hermeneutics and interpretation in inquiries about the meaning of experience in psychiatry, and (like Laing) he drew on psychoanalysis as an interpretative aid, but his work was also heavily influenced by the critical theory of the Frankfurt School.

The most forceful critic of this view was R. D. Laing, who famously attacked the approach enshrined by Jaspers' and Kraepelin's work in chapter two of The Divided Self, proposing instead an existential-phenomenological basis for understanding psychosis. Laing always insisted that schizophrenia is more understandable than is commonly supposed. Mainstream psychiatry has never accepted Laing's ideas, but many in CPN regard The Divided Self as central to twentieth century psychiatry. Laing's influence continued in America through the work of the late Loren Mosher, who worked at the Tavistock Clinic in the mid-1960s, when he also spent time in Kingsley Hall witnessing Laing's work. Shortly after his return to the US, Loren Mosher was appointed Director of Schizophrenia Research at the National Institute of Mental Health, and also the founding editor of the journal Schizophrenia Bulletin.

One of his most notable contributions to this area was setting up and evaluating the first Soteria House, an environment modeled on Kingsley Hall in which people experiencing acute psychoses could be helped with minimal drug use and a form of interpersonal phenomenology influenced by Heidegger. He also conducted evaluation studies of the effectiveness of Soteria. A recent systematic review of the Soteria model found that it achieved as good, and in some areas, better, clinical outcomes with much lower levels of medication (Soteria House was not anti-medication) than conventional approaches to drug treatment.

== Efficacy ==
One comparison study showed 34% of patients of a 'medical model' team were still being treated after two years, compared with only 9% of patients of a team using a 'non-diagnostic' approach (less medication, little diagnosis, individual treatment plans tailored to the person's unique needs). However the study comments that cases may have left the system in the 'non-diagnostic' approach, not because treatment had worked, but because (1) multi-agency involvement meant long-term work may have been continued by a different agency, (2) the starting question of 'Do we think our service can make a positive difference to this young person's life?' rather than 'What is wrong with this young person?' may have led to treatment not being continued, and (3) the attitude of viewing a case as problematic when no improvement has occurred after five sessions may have led to treatment not being continued (rather than the case 'drifting' on in the system).

== Critical Psychiatry and Postpsychiatry ==
Peter Campbell first used the term 'postpsychiatry' in the anthology Speaking Our Minds, which imagines what would happen in a world after psychiatry. Independently, Patrick Bracken and Philip Thomas coined the word later and used it as the title of a series of articles written for Openmind. This was followed by a key paper in the British Medical Journal and a book of the same name. This culminated with the publication by Bradley Lewis, a psychiatrist based in New York, of Moving Beyond Prozac, DSM, and the New Psychiatry: The Birth of Postpsychiatry.

According to Bracken, progress in the field of mental health is presented in terms of 'breakthrough drugs', 'wonders of neuroscience', 'the Decade of the Brain' and 'molecular genetics'. These developments suited the interests of a relatively small number of academic psychiatrists, many of whom have interests in the pharmaceutical industry, although so far the promised insights into psychosis and madness were yet to be realized. Some psychiatrists have turned to another form of technology, Cognitive Behavioural Therapy, although this does draw attention to the person's relationship with their experiences (such as voices or unusual beliefs), and focuses on helping them to find different ways of coping, it however, it is based on a particular set of assumptions about the nature of the self, the nature of thought, and how reality is constructed. The pros and cons of this have been explored in some detail in a recent publication.

Framing mental health problems as 'technical' in nature involves prioritising technology and expertise over values, relationships and meanings, the very things that emerge as important for service users, both in their narratives, and in service user-led research. For many service users these issues are of primary importance. Recent meta-analyses into the effectiveness of antidepressants and cognitive therapy in depression confirm that non-specific, non-technical factors (such as the quality of the therapeutic relationship as seen by the patient, and the placebo effect in medication) are more important than the specific factors.

Postpsychiatry tries to move beyond the view that we can only help people through technologies and expertise. Instead, the approach prioritises values, meanings and relationships and sees progress in terms of engaging creatively with the service user movement, and communities. This is considered to be important given evidence that in Britain, Black and Minority Ethnic (BME) communities are particularly poorly served by mental health services. For this reason, an important practical aspect of postpsychiatry is the use of community development in order to engage with these communities. The community development project Sharing Voices Bradford is an example of such an approach.

There are many commonalities between critical psychiatry and postpsychiatry, but it is probably fair to say that whereas postpsychiatry would broadly endorse most aspects of the work of critical psychiatry, the obverse does not necessarily hold. In identifying the modernist privileging of technical responses to madness and distress as a primary problem, postpsychiatry has looked to postmodernist thought for insights. Its conceptual critique of traditional psychiatry draws on ideas from philosophers such as Heidegger, Merleau-Ponty, Foucault and Wittgenstein.

== Anti-psychiatry and Critical Psychiatry ==
The word anti-psychiatry is associated with the South African psychiatrist David Cooper, who used it to refer to the ending of the 'game' the psychiatrist plays with his or her victim (patient). It has been widely used to refer to the writings and activities of a small group of psychiatrists, most notably R.D. Laing, Aaron Esterson, Cooper, and Thomas Szasz (although he rejects the use of the label in relation to his own work, as did Laing and Esterson), and sociologists (Thomas Scheff). Szasz discards even more what he calls the quackery of 'antipsychiatry' than the quackery of psychiatry.

Anti-psychiatry can best be understood against the counter-cultural context in which it arose. The decade of the 1960s was a potent mix of student rebellion, anti-establishment sentiment and anti-war (Vietnam) demonstrations. It saw the rise to prominence of feminism and the American civil rights movement and the Northern Ireland civil rights movement. Across the world, formerly colonised peoples were throwing off the shackles of colonialism. Some of these themes emerged in the Dialectics of Liberation, a conference organized by Laing and others in the Round House in London in 1968.

== Critical Psychiatry Network - Activities ==
CPN is involved in four main areas of work, writing and the publication of academic and other papers, organizing and participating in conferences, activism and support. A glance at the members' publication page on the CPN website reveals in excess of a hundred papers, books and other articles published by people associated with the network over the last twelve years or so. These cover a wide range of topics, from child psychiatry, psychotherapy, the role of diagnosis in psychiatry, critical psychiatry, philosophy and postpsychiatry, to globalization and psychiatry. CPN has also organized a number of conferences in the past, and continues to do so in collaboration with other groups and bodies. It has run workshops for psychiatrists and offers peer supervision face to face and via videolink. It also supports service user and survivor activists who campaign against the role of the pharmaceutical industry in psychiatry, and the campaign for the abolition of the schizophrenia label. The CPN has published a statement in support.
