= Biological psychiatry =

Approach to psychiatry with a biological emphasis

Biological psychiatry or biopsychiatry is an approach to psychiatry that aims to understand mental disorder in terms of the biological function of the nervous system. It is interdisciplinary in its approach and draws on sciences such as neuroscience, psychopharmacology, biochemistry, genetics, epigenetics and physiology to investigate the biological bases of behavior and psychopathology. Biopsychiatry is the branch of medicine which deals with the study of the biological function of the nervous system in mental disorders.

There is some overlap with neurology, which focuses on disorders where gross or visible pathology of the nervous system is apparent, such as epilepsy, cerebral palsy, encephalitis, neuritis, Parkinson's disease and multiple sclerosis. There is also some overlap with neuropsychiatry, which typically deals with behavioral disturbances in the context of apparent brain disorder. In contrast biological psychiatry describes the basic principles and then delves deeper into various disorders. It is structured to follow the organisation of the DSM-IV, psychiatry's primary diagnostic and classification guide. The contributions of this field explore functional neuroanatomy, imaging, and neuropsychology and pharmacotherapeutic possibilities for depression, anxiety and mood disorders, substance abuse and eating disorders, schizophrenia and psychotic disorders, and cognitive and personality disorders.

Biological psychiatry and other approaches to mental illness are not mutually exclusive, but may simply attempt to deal with the phenomena at different levels of explanation. Because of the focus on the biological function of the nervous system, however, biological psychiatry has been particularly important in developing and prescribing drug-based treatments for mental disorders.

In practice, however, psychiatrists may advocate both medication and psychological therapies when treating mental illness. The therapy is more likely to be conducted by clinical psychologists, psychotherapists, occupational therapists or other mental health workers who are more specialized and trained in non-drug approaches.

The history of the field extends back to the ancient Greek physician Hippocrates, but the phrase biological psychiatry was first used in peer-reviewed scientific literature in 1953. The phrase is more commonly used in the United States than in some other countries such as the UK. However the term "biological psychiatry" is sometimes used as a phrase of disparagement in controversial dispute.

== Scope and detailed definition ==
Biological psychiatry is a branch of psychiatry where the focus is chiefly on researching and understanding the biological basis of major mental disorders such as unipolar and bipolar affective (mood) disorders, schizophrenia and organic mental disorders such as Alzheimer's disease. This knowledge has been gained using imaging techniques, psychopharmacology, neuroimmunochemistry and so on. Discovering the detailed interplay between neurotransmitters and the understanding of the neurotransmitter fingerprint of psychiatric drugs such as clozapine has been a helpful result of the research.

On a research level, it includes all possible biological bases of behavior — biochemical, genetic, physiological, neurological and anatomical. On a clinical level, it includes various therapies, such as drugs, diet, avoidance of environmental contaminants, exercise, and alleviation of the adverse effects of life stress, all of which can cause measurable biochemical changes. The biological psychiatrist views all of these as possible etiologies of or remedies for mental health disorders.

However, the biological psychiatrist typically does not discount talk therapies. Medical psychiatric training generally includes psychotherapy and biological approaches. Accordingly, psychiatrists are usually comfortable with a dual approach: "psychotherapeutic methods […] are as indispensable as psychopharmacotherapy in a modern psychiatric clinic".

== Basis for biological psychiatry ==
Sigmund Freud developed psychotherapy in the early 1900s, and through the 1950s this technique was prominent in treating mental health disorders.

However, in the late 1950s, the first modern antipsychotic and antidepressant drugs were developed: chlorpromazine (also known as Thorazine), the first widely used antipsychotic, was synthesized in 1950, and iproniazid, one of the first antidepressants, was first synthesized in 1957. In 1959 imipramine, the first tricyclic antidepressant, was developed.

Based significantly on clinical observations of the above drug results, in 1965 the seminal paper "The catecholamine hypothesis of affective disorders" was published. It articulated the "chemical imbalance" hypothesis of mental health disorders, especially depression. It formed much of the conceptual basis for the modern era in biological psychiatry.

The hypothesis has been extensively revised since its advent in 1965. More recent research points to deeper underlying biological mechanisms as the possible basis for several mental health disorders.

Modern brain imaging techniques allow noninvasive examination of neural function in patients with mental health disorders, however this is currently experimental. With some disorders it appears the proper imaging equipment can reliably detect certain neurobiological problems associated with a specific disorder. If further studies corroborate these experimental results, future diagnosis of certain mental health disorders could be expedited using such methods.

Another source of data indicating a significant biological aspect of some mental health disorders is twin studies. Identical twins have the same nuclear DNA, so carefully constructed studies may indicate the relative importance of environmental and genetic factors on the development of a particular mental health disorder.

The results from this research and the associated hypotheses form the basis for biological psychiatry and the treatment approaches in a clinical setting.

== Scope of clinical biological psychiatric treatment ==
Since various biological factors can affect mood and behavior, psychiatrists often evaluate these before initiating further treatment. For example, dysfunction of the thyroid gland may mimic a major depressive episode, or hypoglycemia (low blood sugar) may mimic psychosis.

While pharmacological treatments are used to treat many mental disorders, other non-drug biological treatments are used as well, ranging from changes in diet and exercise to transcranial magnetic stimulation and electroconvulsive therapy. Types of non-biological treatments such as cognitive therapy, behavioral therapy, and psychodynamic psychotherapy are often used in conjunction with biological therapies. Biopsychosocial models of mental illness are widely in use, and psychological and social factors play a large role in mental disorders, even those with an organic basis such as schizophrenia.

== Diagnostic process ==
Correct diagnosis is important for mental health disorders, otherwise the condition could worsen, resulting in a negative impact on both the patient and the healthcare system. Another problem with misdiagnosis is that a treatment for one condition might exacerbate other conditions. In other cases apparent mental health disorders could be a side effect of a serious biological problem such as concussion, brain tumor, or hormonal abnormality, which could require medical or surgical intervention.

== Examples of biologic treatments ==
- Seasonal affective disorder: light therapy, SSRIs (Like fluoxetine and paroxetine)
- Clinical depression: SSRIs, serotonin-norepinephrine reuptake inhibitors (venlafaxine), serotonin modulator and stimulators (Vortioxetine), dopamine reuptake inhibitors: (bupropion), tricyclic antidepressants, monoamine oxidase inhibitors, electroconvulsive therapy, transcranial magnetic stimulation, fish oil, St. John's wort
- Bipolar disorder: lithium carbonate, antipsychotics (like olanzapine or quetiapine), anticonvulsants (like valproic acid, lamotrigine and topiramate).
- Schizophrenia: antipsychotics such as haloperidol, clozapine, olanzapine, risperidone and quetiapine.
- Generalized anxiety disorder: SSRIs, benzodiazepines, buspirone
- Obsessive-compulsive disorder: tricyclic antidepressants, SSRIs
- ADHD: clonidine, D-amphetamine, methamphetamine, and methylphenidate

== History ==
=== Early 20th century ===
Sigmund Freud was originally focused on the biological causes of mental illness. Freud's professor and mentor, Ernst Wilhelm von Brücke, strongly believed that thought and behavior were determined by purely biological factors. Freud initially accepted this and was convinced that certain drugs (particularly cocaine) functioned as antidepressants. He spent many years trying to "reduce" personality to neurology, a cause he later gave up on before developing his now well-known psychoanalytic theories.

Nearly 100 years ago, Harvey Cushing, the father of neurosurgery, noted that pituitary gland problems often cause mental health disorders. He wondered whether the depression and anxiety he observed in patients with pituitary disorders were caused by hormonal abnormalities, the physical tumor itself, or both.

=== Mid 20th century ===
An important point in modern history of biological psychiatry was the discovery of modern antipsychotic and antidepressant drugs. Chlorpromazine (also known as Thorazine), an antipsychotic, was first synthesized in 1950. In 1952, iproniazid, a drug being trialed against tuberculosis, was serendipitously discovered to have anti-depressant effects, leading to the development of MAOIs as the first class of antidepressants. In 1959 imipramine, the first tricyclic antidepressant, was developed. Research into the action of these drugs led to the first modern biological theory of mental health disorders called the catecholamine theory, later broadened to the monoamine theory, which included serotonin. These were popularly called the "chemical imbalance" theory of mental health disorders.

=== Late 20th century ===
Starting with fluoxetine (marketed as Prozac) in 1988, a series of monoamine-based antidepressant medications belonging to the class of selective serotonin reuptake inhibitors were approved. These were no more effective than earlier antidepressants, but generally had fewer side effects. Most operate on the same principle, which is modulation of monoamines (neurotransmitters) in the neuronal synapse. Some drugs modulate a single neurotransmitter (typically serotonin). Others affect multiple neurotransmitters, called dual action or multiple action drugs. They are no more effective clinically than single action versions. That most antidepressants invoke the same biochemical method of action may explain why they are each similarly effective in rough terms. Recent research indicates antidepressants often work but are less effective than previously thought.

=== Problems with catecholamine/monoamine hypotheses ===
The monoamine hypothesis was compelling, especially based on apparently successful clinical results with early antidepressant drugs, but even at the time there were discrepant findings. Only a minority of patients given the serotonin-depleting drug reserpine became depressed; in fact reserpine even acted as an antidepressant in many cases. This was inconsistent with the initial monoamine theory which said depression was caused by neurotransmitter deficiency.

Another problem was the time lag between antidepressant biological action and therapeutic benefit. Studies showed the neurotransmitter changes occurred within hours, yet therapeutic benefit took weeks.

To explain these behaviors, more recent modifications of the monoamine theory describe a synaptic adaptation process which takes place over several weeks. Yet this alone does not appear to explain all of the therapeutic effects.

== Latest biological hypotheses of mental health disorders ==
New research indicates different biological mechanisms may underlie some mental health disorders, only indirectly related to neurotransmitters and the monoamine chemical imbalance hypothesis.

Recent research indicates a biological "final common pathway" may exist which both electroconvulsive therapy and most current antidepressant drugs have in common. These investigations show recurrent depression may be a neurodegenerative disorder, disrupting the structure and function of brain cells, destroying nerve cell connections, even killing certain brain cells, and precipitating a decline in overall cognitive function.

In this new biological psychiatry viewpoint, neuronal plasticity is a key element. Increasing evidence points to various mental health disorders as a neurophysiological problem which inhibits neuronal plasticity.

This is called the neurogenic hypothesis of depression. It promises to explain pharmacological antidepressant action, including the time lag from taking the drug to therapeutic onset, why downregulation (not just upregulation) of neurotransmitters can help depression, why stress often precipitates mood disorders, and why selective modulation of different neurotransmitters can help depression. It may also explain the neurobiological mechanism of other non-drug effects on mood, including exercise, diet and metabolism. By identifying the neurobiological "final common pathway" into which most antidepressants funnel, it may allow rational design of new medications which target only that pathway. This could yield drugs which have fewer side effects, are more effective and have quicker therapeutic onset.

There is significant evidence that oxidative stress plays a role in schizophrenia.

== Criticism of ==
A number of patients, activists, and psychiatrists dispute biological psychiatry as a scientific concept or as having a proper empirical basis, for example arguing that there are no known biomarkers for recognized psychiatric conditions. This position has been represented in academic journals such as The Journal of Mind and Behavior and Ethical Human Psychology and Psychiatry, which publishes material specifically countering "the idea that emotional distress is due to an underlying organic disease." Alternative theories and models instead view mental disorders as non-biomedical and might explain it in terms of, for example, emotional reactions to negative life circumstances or to acute trauma.

Fields such as social psychiatry, clinical psychology, and sociology may offer non-biomedical accounts of mental distress and disorder for certain ailments and are sometimes critical of biopsychiatry. Social critics believe biopsychiatry fails to satisfy the scientific method because they believe there is no testable biological evidence of mental disorders. Thus, these critics view biological psychiatry as a pseudoscience attempting to portray psychiatry as a biological science.

R.D. Laing argued that attributing mental disorders to biophysical factors was often flawed due to the diagnostic procedure. The "complaint" is often made by a family member, not the patient, the "history" provided by someone other than patient, and the "examination" consists of observing strange, incomprehensible behavior. Ancillary tests (EEG, PET) are often done after diagnosis, when treatment has begun, which makes the tests non-blind and incurs possible confirmation bias. The psychiatrist Thomas Szasz commented frequently on the limitations of the medical approach to psychiatry and argued that mental illnesses are medicalized problems in living.

Silvano Arieti, while approving of the use of medication in some cases of schizophrenia, preferred intensive psychotherapy without medication if possible. He was also known for approving the use of electroconvulsive therapy on those with disorganized schizophrenia in order to make them reachable by psychotherapy. The views he expressed in Interpretation of Schizophrenia are nowadays known as the trauma model of mental disorders, an alternative to the biopsychiatric model.

Giorgio Antonucci, who disapproved of the use of drugs and always rejected the use of electroshock, considered psychiatry a pseudoscience and proposed a non-psychiatric approach to human suffering, based on a philosophical dialogue of a Socratic nature to clarify thought.

== See also ==
- Biopsychiatry controversy
- Biological psychology
- Psychiatry
- Therapygenetics
- Pharmacogenetics
- Neuropsychology
- Medical genetics
