= Experience-focused counselling =

Experience Focussed Counselling (Experience-Focused Counselling) (EFC) is a normalising, non-pathologizing approach to counselling or psychosocial support/accompaniment. It is aimed particularly, but not exclusively, at persons who may be distressed by experiences such as hearing voices a.k.a. auditory hallucinations, visions or other phenomena which are commonly associated with diagnoses such as schizophrenia and other mental disorders.(Schnackenberg & Burr, 2017)

== History ==
The term "Experience Focussed Counselling" is another term used for the "Making Sense of Voices" approach, which is associated with the Hearing Voices Movement.

== Providers ==
Depending on their level of training and experience various professional groups (such as counsellors, therapists, social workers, pedagogues, psychiatrists, psychologists, psychiatric nurses, nurses, occupational therapists) and peer workers (both formally and informally) can and have been using different levels of Experience Focussed Counselling (EFC) depending on the training they have received and their scope of practice (Schnackenberg & Burr, 2017). EFC may be used in addition to traditional talk therapies or instead of it.

In addition to individual practitioners, many agencies and nonprofits have also began to provide peer supportive services, such as the National Alliance on Mental Illness (NAMI), the National Peer support Network, the National Peer Helpers Association, SAMHSA, National Peer Review Committee, and numerous independent service providers and community mental healthcare providers. Now, each state in the U.S. has incorporated this type of experience-focused counseling into their mental healthcare practices.

== Method ==
Depending on the symptoms, histories and traumas of the individual receiving treatment, the methods of treatment may vary, as the experience-focused counseling and peer support movement focuses on the worldview of the individuals. Typically, experience-focused counseling is performed by discussing the symptoms of the individual and their emotional and physical responses to trauma and/or mental illness by examining the individuals' current and past experiences to locate the cause(s) of their symptoms.

By focusing on the experience of the individual rather than the illness, the provider can begin to assist their client in finding the root cause of the trauma and onset of the symptoms causing the distress.

Various therapeutic techniques are used, with the aim of assisting the client in gaining insight and working through symptoms and emotional responses to their individual experiences. These may include:

- Standard talk therapies
- Cognitive behavioral therapy
- EMDR
- Cognitive processing therapy
- Art therapy
- Nature therapy
- Music therapy
- Peer support
- Group therapy

== See also ==
- Trauma model of mental disorders
