= Trauma model of mental disorders =

Theory in psychopathology

The trauma model of mental disorders, or trauma model of psychopathology, emphasises the effects of physical, sexual and psychological trauma as key causal factors in the development of psychiatric disorders, including depression and anxiety as well as psychosis, whether the trauma is experienced in childhood or adulthood. It conceptualises people as having understandable reactions to traumatic events rather than suffering from mental illness.

Trauma models emphasise that traumatic experiences are more common and more significant in terms of aetiology than has often been thought in people diagnosed with mental disorders. Such models have their roots in some psychoanalytic approaches, notably Sigmund Freud's early ideas on childhood sexual abuse and hysteria, Pierre Janet's work on dissociation, and John Bowlby's attachment theory. There is significant research supporting the linkage between early experiences of chronic maltreatment and severe neglect and later psychological problems.

In the 1960s, trauma models became associated with humanist and anti-psychiatry approaches, particularly regarding understanding schizophrenia and the role of the family. Personality disorders have also been a focus, particularly borderline personality disorder, with the role of dissociation and 'freezing responses' (more extreme reactions than fight-flight when someone is terrified and traumatised) thought to have a significant role in the aetiology of psychological disturbance. Extreme versions of trauma models have implicated the fetal environment and the trauma of being born. Still, these are not well-supported in the academic literature and have been associated with recovered memory controversies.

People are traumatised by a wide range of people, not just family members. For example, male victims of sexual abuse report being abused in institutional settings (boarding schools, care homes, sports clubs).

Trauma models thus highlight stressful and traumatic factors in early attachment relations and the development of mature interpersonal relationships. They are often presented as a counterpoint to psychiatric orthodoxy and inform criticisms of mental health research and practice in that it has become too focused on genetics, neurochemistry and medication.

== History ==
From the 1940s to the 1970s, prominent mental health professionals associated with neo-Freudian and psychodynamic psychology proposed trauma models as a means of understanding schizophrenia, including Harry Stack Sullivan, Frieda Fromm-Reichmann, Theodore Lidz, Gregory Bateson, Silvano Arieti and R.D. Laing. Based on their clinical work, they theorized that schizophrenia appears to be induced by children's experiences in profoundly disturbed families and reflects victims' attempts to cope with such families and live in societies that are inherently damaging to people's psychological well-being. In the 1950s, Sullivan's theory that schizophrenia is related to interpersonal relationships was widely accepted in the United States. Arieti's book, Interpretation of Schizophrenia, won the American National Book Award in the field of science in 1975. The book advanced a psychological model for understanding all the regressive types of the disorder.

Some of the psychogenic models proposed by the non-biologic psychologists, such as that of the "schizophrenogenic mother", came under sustained criticism from feminists who saw them as 'mother-blaming' and from a psychiatric profession that increasingly moved towards biological determinism. From the 1960s, pharmacological treatments became the increasing focus of psychiatry, and by the 1980s, the theory that family dynamics could be implicated in the aetiology of schizophrenia became viewed as unacceptable by many mental health professionals in America and Europe. Before he died in 2001, Theodore Lidz, one of the main proponents of the "schizophrenogenic" parents theory, expressed regret that current research in biological psychiatry was "barking up the wrong tree." Like Lidz, Laing maintained until his death that family relationships influenced the cause of both schizoid personality disorder and schizophrenia. Some more recent research has provided support for this. For instance, child abuse has been shown to have a causal role in depression, PTSD, eating disorders, substance abuse and dissociative disorders, and research reveals that the more severe the abuse, the higher the probability that psychiatric symptoms will develop in adult life.

Judith Herman's book Trauma and Recovery has heavily influenced therapeutic approaches. Recovery entails three phases that are best worked through sequentially: first, "establishing safety"; second, a process of remembrance and mourning for what was lost; and third, "reconnecting with community and, more broadly, society."

== Critiques ==
Critics of the model, such as August Piper, argue that the logic that childhood trauma causes insanity has a serious flaw: if the claim were true, the abuse of millions of children over the years should have caused higher prevalence-rates of mental disorders than the literature reveals. However, this critique disregards the possibility of underdiagnosis and the fact that not every instance of abuse causes lasting trauma.

Other critics, particularly proponents of behavior family therapy, have seen trauma models as parent-blaming and have emphasized the fact that families are usually the main, and often only, source of support for people diagnosed with severe mental-illness. Lucy Johnstone has pointed out that some critics advocate family interventions for adult psychiatric patients whilst at the same time maintaining that childhood experiences are not causal as regards mental illness, as if family members can only have a helpful or damaging impact on their adult children.

In response to Piper's assertion, it has been noted that it has been stated by Arieti in Interpretation of Schizophrenia that trauma is more significant when committed by people to whom young human beings are emotionally bonded, and that abuse is often interwoven with other forms of neglect and with confusing behaviours from caregivers:

First of all, we have to repeat here what we already mentioned..., that conditions of obvious external danger, as in the case of wars, disasters, or other adversities that affect the collectivity, do not produce the type of anxiety that hurts the inner self and do not themselves favor schizophrenia. Even extreme poverty, physical illness, or personal tragedies do not necessarily lead to schizophrenia unless they have psychological ramifications that hurt the sense of self. Even homes broken by death, divorce or desertion may be less destructive than homes where both parents are alive, live together, and constantly undermine the child's conception of himself.

== Recent approaches ==
A 2005 meta-analysis of schizophrenia revealed that the prevalence of physical and sexual abuse in the histories of people diagnosed with psychotic disorders is very high and has been understudied. This literature review revealed prevalence rates of childhood sexual abuse in studies of people diagnosed with schizophrenia ranging from 45% to 65%. An analysis of the American National Comorbidity Study revealed that people who have endured three kinds of abuse (e.g., sexual, physical, and bullying) are at an 18-fold higher risk of psychosis. In contrast, those experiencing five types are 193 times more likely to become psychotic. A 2012 review article supported the hypothesis that current or recent trauma may affect an individual's assessment of the more distant past, changing the experience of the past and resulting in dissociative states. Several reviews of risk factors for common mental disorders have emphasised trauma. Such research has rejuvenated interest in this field, from clinicians, researchers and service user organisations such as the Hearing Voices Movement.

Psychiatrist Colin Ross calls his model the "trauma model of mental disorders" and emphasises that, unlike biological models, this addresses the literature on comorbidity of trauma with mental disorders. Ross describes the theoretical basis of his trauma model: "The problem faced by many patients is that they did not grow up in a reasonably healthy, normal family. They grew up in an inconsistent, abusive and traumatic family. The very people to whom the child had to attach for survival were also abusers and hurt him or her badly... The basic conflict, the deepest pain, and the deepest source of symptoms, is the fact that mom and dad's behavior hurts, does not fit together, and does not make sense."

In terms of psychoses, most researchers and clinicians believe that genetics remains a causative risk factor, but "genes alone do not cause the illness." Modern views of genetics see genes more like dimmer switches, with environmental factors switching the genes on; the more severe the environmental stress, the greater the effect genes have.

In the field of criminology, Lonnie Athens developed a theory of how a process of brutalization by parents or peers that usually occurs in childhood results in violent crimes in adulthood. Richard Rhodes's Why They Kill describes Athens's observations about domestic and societal violence in the criminals' backgrounds. Both Athens and Rhodes reject the genetic inheritance theories.

Criminologists Jonathan Pincus and Dorothy Otnow Lewis believe that although it is the interaction of childhood abuse and neurological disturbances that explains murder, virtually all of the 150 murderers they studied over 25 years had suffered severe abuse as children. Pincus believes that the only feasible remedy for crime would be the prevention of child abuse.

== See also ==
- Adverse childhood experiences
- Attachment in children
- Biomedical model
- Biopsychiatry controversy – Controversy in psychiatry
- Complex post-traumatic stress disorder
- Early infanticidal childrearing
- Psychohistory table - trauma model of different personalities
- Paraphrenia
- Refrigerator mother theory – Discredited historical theory about the cause of autism spectrum disorders
