= Hearing Voices Network =

Peer-focused organizations for people who hear voices

Hearing Voices Networks, closely related to the Hearing Voices Movement, are peer-focused national organizations for people who experience auditory hallucinations (namely, hearing voices) and supporting family members, activists and mental health practitioners. Members may or may not have a psychiatric diagnosis. Networks promote an alternative approach, where voices are not necessarily seen as signs of mental illness and regard hearing voices as a meaningful and understandable, although unusual, human variation. Voices are not seen as the problem, rather it is the relationship the person has with their voices that is regarded as the main issue.

== Development ==
The first hearing voices network was founded in the Netherlands in 1987 by the Dutch psychiatrist Marius Romme, the science journalist, Sandra Escher, and voice hearer, Patsy Hage. This was followed by the founding of the UK network in 1988 based in Manchester, England. Subsequently networks have been established in 29 countries over the world, including Australia, Canada, the UK, and the United States. The first 15 years of the global networks' development is outlined by Adam James in his book Raising Our Voices (2001).

The National and Regional Networks are affiliated with the international umbrella organization known as Intervoice (The International Network for Training Education and Research into Hearing Voices) and often referred to as the Hearing Voices Movement. Within these international networks, the combined experience of voice-hearers and professionals have overseen the development of ways of working with people who hear voices, drawing on the value of peer support and helping people live peacefully and positively with their experiences.

== Purpose ==
The principal roles of Hearing Voices Networks are as follows:

1. To support and develop local Hearing Voices Support Groups
2. Raise awareness of the hearing voices approach
3. To campaign for human rights and social justice for people who hear voices
4. To provide information, advice and support to people who hear voices, their family, friends
5. To provide training and education for mental health services and practitioners

== Practices and philosophy ==
These networks are designed to support voice hearers specifically through local hearing voices support groups, where people who hear voices are afforded the opportunity in a non-medical setting to share their experiences, coping mechanisms, and explanatory frameworks. These groups are run in different ways and some are exclusive to individuals who hear voices, while others are supported by mental health workers. Groups are based in a range of settings, from community centers, libraries, churches, child and adolescent mental health services, prisons, and inpatient units.

Groups are designed to function as peer support groups meant foster socialization and belonging, not therapy and treatment. Members are encouraged to talk about their experiences, to learn what the voices mean to them, and how to gain control over their experiences. Should members desire to, groups can help members explore the relationship between their life history and their experience of hearing voices.

Studies show that members found attending hearing voices groups a largely positive experience, being able to share their experiences and explore and experiment with different coping strategies. Members also said that attending improved their self esteem, helped them make friends, and allowed them to feel more prepared for the future.

Studies have found that after attending hearing voices groups, members' hospital bed use decreased and there was a trend for less formal admissions. People's relationships with the voices were mostly improved and heard the voices less frequently. The voices were perceived as less powerful and having less control over them, and participants reported feeling better able to cope the voices and less alone. Importantly, evaluations showed that members improved in what they had identified as their own goals for the group.

National networks have developed considerably over the years and host websites, publish newsletters, guides to the voice hearing experience, and workbooks where individuals can record and explore their own experiences with voice hearing.

Romme has provided an intellectual basis for these groups in the book Accepting Voices, where he advocates a view that the hearing of voices is not necessarily an indication of mental illness and that patients should be encouraged to explore their voices and negotiate with them.

== Bibliography ==
- Barker, Paul K. (2011) [1995]. The voice inside. Manchester, England: Hearing Voices Network. OCLC 181679777.
- Blackman, Lisa (2001). Hearing voices, embodiment and experience. London New York: Free Association Books. ISBN 9781853435331.
- Coleman, Ron; Smith, Mike (1997). Working with voices: victim to victor. Newton-le-Willows, Merseyside: Handsell. ISBN 9781903199015.
- Dillon, Jacqui; Longden, Eleanor (2011), "Hearing voices groups: creating safe spaces to share taboo experiences", in Romme, Marius A.J.; Escher, Sandra D. (eds.), Psychosis as a personal crisis: an experience based approach, Hove, East Sussex New York, New York: Routledge for The International Society for the Psychological Treatments of the Schizophrenias and other pychoses (ISPS), pp. 129–139, ISBN 9780415673303.
- Haddock, Gillian; Bentall, Richard P.; Slade, Peter D. (1996), "Psychological treatments for auditory hallucinations, focussing or distraction?", in Haddock, Gillian; Slade, Peter D. (eds.), Cognitive-behavioural interventions with psychotic disorders, London: Routledge, pp. 45–71, ISBN 9780415102902.
- Haddock, Gillian; Bentall, Richard P.; Slade, Peter D. (1993). "Psychological treatment of chronic auditory hallucinations: two case studies". Behavioral and Cognitive Psychotherapy. 21 (4): 335–346. doi:10.1017/S1352465800011668. S2CID 146155388.
- James, Adam (2001). Raising our voices: an account of the hearing voices movement. Handsell Publishing. ISBN 9781903199138.
- Leudar, Ivan; Thomas, Philip (2000). Voices of reason, voices of insanity: studies of verbal hallucinations. London New York: Psychology Press. ISBN 9780415147866.
- Longden, Eleanor (2013). Learning from the voices in my head. Cambridge: TED Books.
- Oakland, Lauren; Berry, Katherine (2014). ""Lifting the veil": a qualitative analysis of experiences in Hearing Voices Network groups". Psychosis. doi:10.1080/17522439.2014.937451.
- Romme, Marius A.J.; Escher, Sandra D. (2000). Making sense of voices: the mental health professional's guide to working with voice-hearers. London: Mind Publications. ISBN 9781874690863.
- Romme, Marius A.J.; Escher, Sandra D.; Dillon, Jacqui; Corstens, Dirk; Morris, Mervyn (2009). Living with voices: 50 stories of recovery. Herefordshire: PCCS Books in association with Birmingham City University. ISBN 9781906254223.
- Stephens, G. Lynn; Graham, George (2000). When self-consciousness breaks: alien voices and inserted thoughts. Philosophical Pychopathology Series. Cambridge, Massachusetts: MIT Press. ISBN 9780262194372.
- Styron, Thomas; Utter, Lauren; Davidson, Larry (2017). "The hearing voices network: initial lessons and future directions for mental health professionals and Systems of Care". Psychiatric Quarterly. 88 (4). Springer Nature. doi:10.1007/s11126-017-9491-1.
- Watkins, John (2008) [1998]. Hearing voices: a common human experience. Melbourne, Victoria: Michelle Anderson Publishing. ISBN 9780855723903.
