= Interpretation of Schizophrenia =

1955 book by Silvano Arieti

- Author: Silvano Arieti
- Language: English
- Subject: Psychology

Interpretation of Schizophrenia (first edition, 1955) is a book by Italy-born American psychiatrist Silvano Arieti in which the author sets forth demonstrative evidence of a psychological etiology for schizophrenia.

Arieti expanded the book vastly in 1974 (ISBN 0-465-03429-2) and that edition won the U.S. National Book Award in the Science category.

Interpretation of schizophrenia is a 756-page book divided in 45 chapters. Arieti begins his book stating that it is difficult to define schizophrenia. He asks if schizophrenia is an illness and answers in the negative, since the disorder is not understood in classic Virchowian criterion of cellular pathology. Though those searching for a biological basis of schizophrenia far outnumber those undertaking psychological approaches, Arieti supports the minority view. He believes schizophrenia is an unrealistic way to represent both the self and the world and praises psychiatrist Adolf Meyer for stressing the importance of psychological factors in the etiology of schizophrenia.

== The basis of schizophrenia ==
Arieti examines the family history of people with schizophrenia, and references twin studies to support the notion that the potentiality for schizophrenia has a genetic basis, but maintains that this genetic potentiality is not enough to predispose someone to schizophrenia unless early life events also set up the vulnerability to breakdown later in life. A person who has the genetic predisposition, but was not subject to the life experiences necessary to develop this vulnerability will not become schizophrenic in later life.

He observed that in twin pairs, where one twin developed schizophrenia, the schizophrenic twin was less able to adapt to adverse life events compared to the healthier twin, and that following the schizophrenic breakdown of the other twin, in some cases the healthy twin was also vulnerable to developing schizophrenic symptoms, but these were quantitatively milder compared to the twin who first developed schizophrenia. Thus, even with the better adapted twin, a level of vulnerability remained towards a breakdown.

== Pre-psychotic personality types ==
Arieti divides the pre-psychotic personality into two subgroups, which are the schizoid and the stormy types. The pre-psychotic schizoid type of personality's main adaptation involves the withdrawal typical of the schizoid personality disorder, wherein the person has limited to no social or emotional bonds, and mainly resorts to isolation and eschewing human relations to avoid potential retraumatization by others. They frequently substitute real human relations with a rich inner fantasy life. The pre-psychotic schizoid avoids conflict with the parents by passively submitting to their wishes, but he does so without any real zest or ambition, just going through the motions with minimal effort.

The stormy personality on the other hand tries strives to maintain social relations and emotional bonds, but the person in question is confused about their sense of self, as they mainly adapt to social situations by mirroring the perceived expectations of those around them and integrating it into a false self presented to the outside world. The stormy personality is always uncertain about their sense of self, compared to the pure schizoid personality, and this leaves them with a lack of ontological security. The stormy personality, owing to their adaptation, fails to develop true, deep relations with anyone due to their need to maintain a false persona that is always changed based on the perceived expectations of others. The stormy personality tries to please those around them as much as possible to win approval, especially the parents, even to the point of self-abandonment.

== Family as a cause ==
Arieti then describes the psychogenic factors that lead to the disorder. The family environment and psychodynamics in the etiology of psychosis comes under scrutiny. He describes the building of neurotic and psychotic defense mechanisms; the emerging schizoid or stormy personality, and fully developed schizophrenia understood as an injury to the inner self following a series of adverse life events. Arieti believes that a state of extreme anxiety originating in early childhood produces vulnerability for the whole life of the individual, and that this anxiety can later be reactivated by adverse life events, where the individual's coping mechanisms fail to maintain a positive sense of self in face of these adversities.

A characteristic of Homo sapiens is a prolonged childhood with a consequently extended dependency on adults. This, according to Arieti, "is the basis of the psychodynamics of schizophrenia", a claim that also appears in later writers on child abuse such as Alice Miller and Colin Ross. Arieti reviews the paper by Frieda Fromm-Reichmann about the "schizophrenogenic" mother and reaches the tentative conclusion that only 25 percent of the mothers of people with schizophrenia in his clinical experience fit that image. However, he adds that only in a minority of schizophrenia cases "the child is able to retain the good maternal image". He clarifies that the internal maternal image is not based solely on the real mother, but is rather influenced by all relations the patient has throughout his life. The reason for this is that from infancy onward, the relationship with the mother lays the basis for all future relationships, and remains as an internal model for every relationship the patient has, and is shaped and altered by any future relations that influence the patient's view of the world, and of society at large. Arieti also mentions the work of Theodore Lidz, another trauma model author of schizophrenia. Like Lidz, Arieti emphasizes the parental dynamic of a domineering, hostile parent, and the other, weak spouse who is submissive to the dominant parent, and the role of this dynamic in the development of schizophrenia in the children of such dysfunctional parents. In Arieti's own words:

In the first edition of this book I have described one family constellation [...] when a domineering, nagging and hostile mother, who gives the child no chance to assert himself, is married to a dependent, weak man, who is too weak to help the child [...]. In these families the weak parent [...] becomes antagonistic and hostile toward the children because [...] he displaces his anger from the spouse to the children, as the spouse is too strong to be a suitable target.

The roles can be reversed when the domineering spouse is the father. If the child cannot build positive relations with the mother or the father, then he will try to find a positive maternal image in others. A brother, a sister, or other relatives, a teacher, or any other available individual the child can relate with. If the child manages to build up a relationship, where he receives healthy nurturance, reassurement and empathy, which allows them to build up a positive self-image, then the vulnerability to a schizophrenic breakdown can be averted entirely. In the cases of schizophrenia, however, the breakdown is proof that this attempt failed time and time again for the individual.

Arieti is convinced that each schizophrenia case is representative of those human situations in which something went extremely wrong. "If we ignore it, we become deaf to a profound message that the patient may try to convey". As described in the book, in case of two brothers, Peter and Gabriel, of whom Gabriel later suffered a schizophrenic break, Arieti states that, as described by the brother, "his adolescence was a crescendo of frustration, anxiety and injury to self-esteem". Of the two brothers, Peter was the favorite of the father, who was an extremely narcissistic man who depended on Peter to maintain his self-esteem by telling fabricated stories of his time in Germany during World War II, whereas Gabriel was mostly ignored and neither parent ever really paid attention to him or gave him any affection. Gabriel tried to turn to Peter for help, but he was rejected by Peter throughout his childhood. Gabriel went through his childhood without ever disagreeing with or asserting himself in front of his parents. He later developed schizophrenia in his teens, not long after returning to home from a private school. Gabriel expressed his anxiety regarding private schooling, and wished to return home so he could work on one of the family farms. However, even at his own work he was not allowed to make decisions for himself: Ignoring what Gabriel was taught in school, his mother practically told him how to plant every single vegetable on the farm, and how to tend to other needs. Gabriel, much like in his childhood, did not try to assert himself. As a result of this he tried to give up on his job, which incited further ire and hostility from the parents. Following these events, Gabriel soon developed a complete psychotic break, and was institutionalized multiple times, before committing suicide.

== Pre-psychotic panic ==
In Part three of Interpretation of schizophrenia Arieti describes how in spite of its efforts to stay in reality, the patient's defenses finally succumb when attacks on the self-image both from outside and within cause the anxiety to become too unbearable. When the patient "cannot change the unbearable situation of himself any longer, he has to change reality". Arieti examines the inner world of the person with schizophrenia, and the genesis of the schizophrenic regression.

Arieti maintains that even with the schizophrenic potentiality laid down in early childhood and by genetic predisposition, not all of these cases will develop psychosis, as new defense mechanisms are acquired throughout the life of the individual. For schizophrenics however, all such attempts eventually fail at staving off a complete break. The negative self-image that is dissociated from the conscious mind of the individual may be reactivated by any number of life events, such as entering a into a new relationship, the birth of a child, or a tragic accident, the death of a relative, especially the death of parents, moving out of home, stress at work, the loss of a job, or a promotion at work which destabilizes the individual's sense of competency at his own job, or a combination of several of these factors.

This anxiety triggers the pre-psychotic period, which precedes the eventual psychotic break. These adverse life events bring the dissociated, negative self image from early childhood into consciousness, causing the person to view themselves as utterly defeated, unlovable, incompetent, worthless, etc. This type of anxiety cannot be tolerated by the individual for long, and as his defenses fail to defuse this anxiety, he will resort to increasingly inadequate coping mechanisms to maintain a positive self-image and reduce their anxiety.

Arieti describes the concept of paleological/teleological thinking, which is typical of small children and primitive peoples, with concrete examples of such thought in African tribal societies and in small children. At the beginning of the pre-psychotic panic, the individual's feelings of self-accusation and self-defeat are slowly transformed into feelings of vulnerability, fear and anguish. He feels cut off from the world itself because of his failure and worthlessness, and feels like he cannot join in with the rest of the world. He is overwhelmed by a vague perception of danger, a need to escape, and of confusion. He feels threatened from all sides, as if he were in a jungle. It is not a jungle where lions, tigers, snakes and spiders are to be found, but a jungle of concepts, where the threat is not to survival, but to the self image. The dangers are concept feelings, such as that of being unlovable, inadequate, unacceptable, inferior, awkward, clumsy, not belonging, peculiar, different, rejected, humiliated, guilty, unable to find his own way amongst the many different paths of life, disgraced, discriminated against, kept at a distance, suspected, and so on.

These feelings of terror and persecution are then transformed into concretized concepts and projections. The schizophrenic, in an attempt to ward off unbearable anxiety, will resort to using paleological thinking to distort reality in such a way that reduces anxiety. Projection is used to displace self-accusations and attacks on the self-esteem to the outside world in the form of persecutors and persecutory forces.

The individual in the pre-psychotic stage may still recover if he manages to adopt adequate coping mechanisms, but if this fails, the pre-psychotic period will eventually be followed by a complete schizophrenic break when he experiences a total and complete defeat of his self-worth and self-esteem.

== Schizophrenic thinking ==
Arieti describes a distinct type of logic, separate from the aristotelian logic used by modern man in advanced societies, called "paleological thinking", or primary process thinking. In paleological thought, nature's events are attributed to the will of outside forces. "If the greeks were afflicted by an epidemic, it was because Phoebus wanted to punish Agamemnon." In the world of paleological thinking, every happening that is relevant to the schizophrenic's complexes is interpreted as being willed by the projected persecutors of the individual. Primary process thinking, which is only encountered in dreams and in early childhood by modern man, is adapted by the schizophrenic to reduce destructive anxiety. Aristotelian logic is abandoned almost entirely, and primary process thinking gains more and more footing as the disease progresses from acute to chronic schizophrenia.

In deterministic or paleological/teleologic causality, if Nature's happenings were not willed they simply would not occur. In paranoid projection the schizophrenic takes out from him/herself a disagreeable part of the self onto the world. In Interpretation of schizophrenia Arieti illustrates all of the above theoretical constructions with concrete cases of his clinical experience as a psychiatrist. Anxiety-provoking material is projected onto the environment, because for the schizophrenic it is easier to be accused by others, than to accuse oneself. So for the person who feels disappointed with his life, and with himself, who sees himself as a failure, it is easier to imagine being persecuted by a group of agents who themselves are as deplorable and worthless, as he deep down sees himself, and want to bring him down to their level. It is less anxiety-provoking than to admit to himself that he sees himself as being worthless and deplorable, and it restores a sense of control, and also helps bolster self-esteem through gross over-appraisal of oneself as an individual who is persecuted because he is exceptional for one reason or another, such as being a savior, a prophet, etc.

Thus the patient who sees himself as a faker, a liar, or a homosexual will instead transform his inner persecutory world and project it onto the world, in the form of persecutors who accuse him of being a spy, a homosexual, a liar, or a faker, etc. It is no longer he who accuses himself of being worthless, rotten, but it is "them" accusing him. It is "them" who are after him, who want to ruin him and bring him down. The self-image and self-esteem are improved at the cost of gross distortion of reality and of the self-image.

When a patient states he is Jesus he is compensating a feeling of extreme humiliation at home. The paranoid schizophrenic, Arieti explains, resorts to "teleologic causality" or animism to understand the world. He writes that whatever occurs to the patient is interpreted as willed by the split off, internal negative parental images of the patient. With paranoid schizophrenics, the paleological thinking and distortion are limited only to the complexes of the person, while in hebephrenic patients there is a total and complete disintegration of aristotelian logic, and the entire personality is reduced to primary process thinking. Arieti observed that paranoid schizophrenia is more common in children who frequently felt rejected or neglected by their parents, and in brighter schizophrenics who were able to maintain a set of inner persecutory complexes that helped avoid destructive anxiety, whereas in hebephrenics this distortion failed to alleviate anxiety, causing further regression. In the case of catatonic patients, it is more common that the patient was subjected to overbearing parenting and had little to no chance of asserting themselves. The catatonic patient internalizes the overbearing parental image, and chooses immobility to avoid provoking the ire of the internalized persecutory parental image. He brings up the example of a catatonic patient who, after introjecting the mother's engulfing behavior, believed that by moving he could produce havoc. The patient's feelings, according to Arieti, became reminiscent of cosmic powers that may cause the destruction of the universe, so the patient chose immobility. For Arieti, the selectivity of certain motor actions is proof that catatonia is not a biological disease or illness, but rather a disorder of the will.

== Self-image of the schizophrenic ==
According to Arieti, the pre-schizophrenic person in early childhood fails to build a healthy self-image, being unable to assert themselves in a healthy manner against their primary caregivers, as the dominant, narcissistic and hostile parent allows the child no chance to build up healthy limits and distinctions between themselves and the parent. The dominant parent sees the child less as an individual being, and more as an extension of themselves. The passive parent who projects their hostility from the dominant parent will also thwart such attempts. This is further complicated if other family members also take part in maintaining this atmosphere of hostility. Frequently the child who later becomes schizophrenic is either the dominant parent's favorite child, on whom the dominant parent depends for their self-esteem and self-gratification, or the family scapegoat who sits at the bottom of the family hierarchy, who is used as a lightning rod for discharging hostility within the family both by siblings and by the parents.

All children have an internal need to see their parents in a positive light, as the child depends on the parents for survival, even if the parental behavior is destructive to the child's self-esteem. In most cases the parental internal images can be corrected if the individual manages to build up healthy, emphatic relationships outside the family nucleus later in life, such as at school, at work, etc. However, for pre-schizophrenics, this does not occur, so the internal parental images remain unchallenged. So the child will idealize the hostile parents, but to do this, he must balance this out by maintaining a negative self-image. However, this self-image is too anxiety-provoking, so it remains dissociated deep down in the subconscious throughout the life of the individual, until adverse life events reactivate this hidden self-image, and with it, the destructive anxiety associated with it.

== Psychotherapy of the schizophrenic ==
Arieti himself preferred intensive psychotherapy of acute schizophrenic patients, with almost daily sessions every day of the week. He believed that in order to help reduce the suffering of the schizophrenic and to help them regain contact with the real world, the therapist needed to provide a trustworthy, intimate and stable relationship to the patient, a person who themselves never experienced such a relationship before. Unlike most psychiatrists, Arieti, like Sullivan and Bertram Karon, valued the content of the delusions as essential, albeit distorted manifestations of the original complexes by which the patient's destructive anxiety is fueled. He believed that meeting the schizophrenic in their own world, but not conforming with or reassuring their delusions was essential to gaining the trust of the patient, and building a healthy connection.

He believed that by providing a stable and loving relationship, the therapist can help the patient build up a more positive self-image, as well as gain more adequate coping mechanisms for dealing with life events, and even building up more healthy relations with the family members. For Arieti, it was essential to help the patient develop a new, more healthy personality that was better adjusted to life, than to return to the pre-psychotic personality of the patient. As treatment progresses, the patient will more easily let go of their delusions and distortions of reality, allowing the original complexes that fueled their anxiety to be re-examined and processed. The goal of the therapist is to help guide the patient through the development of this new personality, by providing them with a positive, reassuring and empathic internal image. Arieti himself showcases his psychotherapeutic method with two cases, the cases of Geraldine and Mark in Interpretation of Schizophrenia.

== Other treatment methods ==
Arieti was known for frequently sending hebephrenic patients for electroconvulsive therapy in order to restore them to a more functional level where they can be reached with psychotherapy, and he himself approved of the use of anti-psychotic medication to reduce symptomatology, however he himself preferred psychotherapy without any medication. He also explores and discusses other methods of treatment, such as insulin shock therapy and psychosurgery, the latter of which he disapproves, maintaining that it is essentially an act of giving up on the patient and resorting to turning him into a lifelong cripple.

== Closing remarks ==
Arieti maintains that in every case of schizophrenia that he studied serious family disturbance was found. When the patient idealizes the parent the idealized image of the parent is maintained in the patient's mind at the expense of an unbearable self-image. Pre-psychotic panic is only triggered when the negative self-image is brought to the surface by adverse life events that damage the inner self of the pre-schizophrenic person, life events with which he is unable to cope with his existing defensive and coping mechanisms. The split-off negative image of the parents, and of others are transformed into a "distressing other", in the form of delusions of persecution, and voices heard by the patient. The parent or parents alters enter the mind accusing the patient of "bad child" or other equivalent accusations in voices that the adult patient hears.

Since the 1980s, and into the beginnings of 21st century, biological psychiatric models of schizophrenia almost completely took over the psychiatric profession. Current research into the disorder focuses on neurobiology. Psychological approaches to schizophrenia like Arieti's are a rarity in the profession, although this structurally created circumstance neglects the obvious connection between psychological phenomena and neurotransmitter levels, which can be changed through certain practices, like Yoga, meditation, hyperventilation, sensory deprivation, sleep deprivation, among others. Arieti's views on schizophrenia are nowadays known as part of the trauma model of mental disorders, an alternative to the current biopsychiatric model.

== See also ==
- R.D. Laing
- Refrigerator mother
- Ross Institute for Psychological Trauma
- The Gene Illusion
- Schizophrenia compared to dream
- Trauma model of mental disorders
- Biopsychiatry controversy
- Silvano Arieti
