= Peter Lehmann (author) =

German author

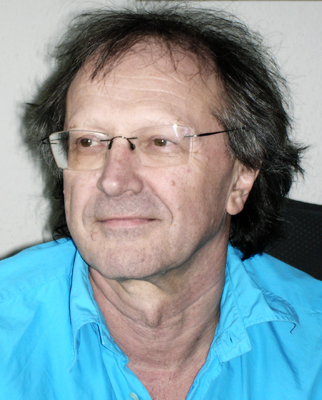
Peter Lehmann (2005)

Peter Lehmann (born 1950 in Calw, Black Forest, West Germany), D. Phil. h.c., is an author, social scientist, publisher, and an independent freelance activist in humanistic anti-psychiatry, living in Berlin, Germany.

In 1986, he founded Peter Lehmann Publishing in Berlin and published his first book, Der chemische Knebel (The Chemical Gag) (Berlin: Antipsychiatrieverlag 1986) in German through his own Antipsychiatric Publishing House. In 2003, he founded a branch in the United Kingdom and in 2004 in the United States of America.

In 1980, Peter Lehmann was co-founder of a support group of (ex-) users and survivors of psychiatry and advised about psychiatric drugs and withdrawal until 1989. In 1987, he was co-founder of PSYCHEX (Switzerland), an alliance of lawyers, doctors and survivors of psychiatry to support people who are incarcerated in psychiatric institutions); since then, board member. In 1989, he was co-founder of the Organization for the Protection from Psychiatric Violence (running the Runaway House Berlin, which opened its house for people seeking shelter from psychiatric violence in 1996).

In 1991, he was co-founder of the European Network of (ex-) Users and Survivors of Psychiatry (ENUSP) and was the organization’s Chair from 1997 to 1999 and was a board member until 2010. In 1997, he was co-founder of the World Network of Users and Survivors of Psychiatry (WNUSP)

Since 2000, Peter Lehmann has been co-editor of the Journal of Critical Psychology, Counselling and Psychotherapy (United Kingdom). Since 2002, he has been a member of MindFreedom International and was its designated representative to the United Nations. In 2007, he was a member of the Organizational Committee of the Conference "Coercive Treatment in Psychiatry", run by the World Psychiatric Association in Dresden. He is blogger at Mad in America, associate of the International Institute for Psychiatric Drug Withdrawal and member of the Specialist Committee for Psychiatric Drugs of the Deutsche Gesellschaft für soziale Psychiatrie e.V. (German Society for Social Psychiatry).

== Honors and awards ==
In 2010, Peter Lehmann was awarded an honorary doctorate in acknowledgment of "exceptional scientific and humanitarian contribution to the rights of the people with psychiatric experience" by the School of Psychology of the Aristotle University of Thessaloniki, Greece, Philosophical Faculty. Kostas Bairaktaris, Prof. of Clinical Psychology, gave the speech in Peter Lehmann's honor. Lehmann is the first survivor of psychiatry in the world to be honored with an honorary degree for pioneering achievements within the realm of humanistic anti-psychiatry. In 2011, he was awarded the Order of Merit of the Federal Republic of Germany in acknowledgment of service to the community by the President of Germany.

== Criticism of psychiatry ==
A large portion of Lehmann's work concentrates on the iatrogenic (negative, caused by treatment) effects of neuroleptics, the so-called antipsychotics, argues that—similarly to alcohol—in the medium and long term, the harmful effects (receptor-changes, deficit-syndrome, suicidality, tardive psychosis, tardive dyskinesia, obesity, hypercholesterolemia, diabetes, apoptosis, etc.) typically outweigh short-time benefit, if a patient sees any benefit at all. Lehmann also argues that psychiatry as a medical discipline cannot do justice to the expectation of solving mental problems that are largely of a social nature; that its propensity to use involuntary treatment constitutes a threat; and that its diagnostic methods obstruct understanding of the real problems of individuals in society.

For these reasons, Lehmann pleads for developing adequate and effective assistance for people in emotional difficulty and safeguarding their social inclusion. He advocates as well for their civil and political rights in treatment on a par with "normal" patients (which is also the position of the United Nations' Convention on the Rights of Persons with Disabilities), joining forces in cooperation with other human rights and support groups, and support in withdrawing from psychiatric drugs. He promotes the use of alternative and less toxic psychoactive drugs, an ostracization of electroshock (so-called electroconvulsive therapy) up to its ban, and new ways of living with madness and being different, with as much independence from institutions as possible, as well as tolerance, respect and appreciation of diversity at all levels of life.

== Publications ==
Coming off Psychiatric Drugs: Successful Withdrawal from Neuroleptics, Antidepressants, Lithium, Carbamazepine and Tranquilizers (2004) was originally published in German in 1998 and was the first book on this issue world-wide. Beside family members and professionals, Lehmann primarily addresses people who choose to withdraw from these drugs. He shows detailed accounts of how others came off these substances without once again ending up in the doctor's office. Beside people from different countries all over the world, in his practice book professionals, working in psychotherapy, medicine, psychiatry, social work, naturopathy and alternative places, report on how they helped in the withdrawal process. This book is also published in Greek, French and Spanish.

In his second English book, Alternatives beyond psychiatry, co-edited in 2007 with psychiatrist Peter Stastny, Lehmann highlights alternatives beyond psychiatry, current possibilities of self-help for individuals experiencing madness, and strategies towards implementing humane treatment. Also published in the German, Greek and Marathi.

In his latest English book, Withdrawal from Prescribed Psychotropic Drugs, co-edited in 2021 with psychologist Craig Newnes, Lehmann presents a collaboration of professionals in the psychosocial field, researchers, lawyers, and ex-patients around the world (the Global South included) committed to helping people understand the potential harm (including drug dependence) that prescribed psychotropic drugs can cause, based on the latest research findings, and how to reduce or stop taking them with fewer risks.

Peter Lehmann’s books are also published in French, German, Greek, Marathi and Spanish.

== Bibliography ==
=== Books ===
- Lehmann, P. (Ed.) (2004), Coming off Psychiatric Drugs: Successful withdrawal from neuroleptics, antidepressants, lithium, carbamazepine and tranquilizers. ISBN 978-0-9545428-0-1 (U.K.), ISBN 978-0-9788399-0-1 (USA). Berlin / Eugene / Shrewsbury: Peter Lehmann Publishing. Ebook editions in 2022.
- Stastny, P. & Lehmann, P. (Eds.) (2007), Alternatives beyond Psychiatry. ISBN 978-0-9545428-1-8 (U.K.), ISBN 978-0-9788399-1-8 (USA). Berlin / Eugene / Shrewsbury: Peter Lehmann Publishing. Ebook editions in 2022.
- Lehmann, P. & Newnes, C. (Eds.) (2021), Withdrawal from Prescribed Psychotropic Drugs. Ebook editions. ISBN 978-3-925931-83-3, ISBN 978-3-925931-84-0, ISBN 978-0-9545428-8-7. Berlin / Lancaster: Peter Lehmann Publishing.
- Lehmann, P. (2022), Η επιστροφή του ηλεκτροσόκ – Θεραπεία ή βλάβη; ISBN 978-960-9488-26-6. Thessaloniki: Edition Nissides.

=== Selected articles ===
- Lehmann, P. (2024). Psychiatry stripped naked: Current human rights violations in psychiatry in Germany, Greece and the rest of the world. Journal of Critical Psychology, Counselling and Psychotherapy (U.K.), 24(1), 16-37.
- Lehmann, P. (2023). The bright and the dark side of the self-help movement. Ambivalent experiences from almost half a century of involvement in non- and antipsychiatric self-organization and self-help in Germany. Journal of Critical Psychology, Counselling and Psychotherapy (U.K.), 23(4), 26-36.
- Lehmann, P. (2022). A concise guide to electroshock: Indications, mode of action, risks, alternatives. Journal of Critical Psychology, Counselling and Psychotherapy (U.K.), 22(3), 36-45.
- Lehmann, P. (2022). Violações informais dos direitos humanos psiquiátricos: violência psiquiátrica através de desinformação deliberada sobre os riscos de dependência de drogas psicotrópicas e retenção de apoio na sua descontinuação e retirada. In: Paulo Amarante, Fernando Freitas (Eds.), Crise Planetária: pandemia, desigualdades, neoliberalismo e patologização (pp. 62–69). Rio de Janeiro: Laboratório de Estudos e Pesquisas em Saúde Mental e Atenção Psicossocial/Fiocruz ISBN 978-65-00-45355-3.
- Lehmann, P. (2021). Humanistic antipsychiatry and the Journal of Critical Psychology, Counselling and Psychotherapy – a personal retrospect. Journal of Critical Psychology, Counselling and Psychotherapy (U.K.), 21(1), 64-68.
- Aderhold, V., Lehmann, P., Rufer, M. & Zehentbauer, J. (2020). Discontinuing psychotropic drugs? And if so, how? Journal of Critical Psychology, Counselling and Psychotherapy (U.K.), 20(4), 66-75.
- Lehmann, P. (2019). Paradigm shift: Treatment alternatives to psychiatric drugs, with particular reference to low- and middle-income countries. In: L. Davidson (Ed.), The Routledge Handbook of International Development, Mental Health and Wellbeing (pp. 251–269). London / New York: Routledge ISBN 978-0-367-02773-5.
- Lehmann, P. (2019). Transparency first. Disclosure of conflicts of interest in the psychiatric field. Journal of Critical Psychology, Counselling and Psychotherapy (U.K.), 19(2), 131-151.
- Lehmann, P. (2019). Ανθρώπινα δικαιώματα στην ψυχιατρική: Καταρχάς το δικαίωμα στη ζωή. Τετράδια Ψυχιατρικής (Αθήνα), Τεύχος 13, 372-386.
- Lehmann, P. (2018). Teaching withdrawal of antipsychotics and antidepressants to professionals and recipients. In: C. Newnes / L. Golding (Eds.), Teaching Critical Psychology: International perspectives (pp. 148–169). Abingdon / New York: Routledge ISBN 978-1-138-28833-1.
- Lehmann, P. (2015). Are users and survivors of psychiatry only allowed to speak about their personal narratives?. In: J.Z. Sadler, K.W.M. Fulford, & C.W. Van Staden (Eds.), The Oxford Handbook of Psychiatric Ethics, Vol. 1 (pp. 98–104). Oxford: Oxford University Press ISBN 978-0-19-966388-0.
- Lehmann, P. (2015). Securing human rights in the psychiatric field by advance directives. Journal of Critical Psychology, Counselling and Psychotherapy (U.K.), 15(1), 1-10.
- Lehmann, P. (2014). Facebook friends and other enemies. Journal of Critical Psychology, Counselling and Psychotherapy (U.K.), 14(1), 37-43.
- Lehmann, P. (2014). Two contradictory sides of recovery and psychosocial rehabilitation. E-bulletin of the World Association for Psychosocial Rehabilitation) (Madrid), (35), 7-12.
- Lehmann, P. (2013). Early warning signs of chronic or lethal diseases due to the administration of neuroleptics. Journal of Critical Psychology, Counselling and Psychotherapy (U.K.), 13(1), 23-29.
- Lehmann, P. (2013). Me and Thomas Szasz. Contrarian approaches to anti-psychiatry. Asylum–The Magazine for Democratic Psychiatry (U.K.), 20(2), 12.
- Lehmann, P. (2012). About the intrinsic suicidal effects of neuroleptics: Towards breaking the taboo and fighting therapeutical recklessness. International Journal of Psychotherapy, 16(1), 30-49.
- Lehmann, P. (2010). The particular elements of Soteria from the perspective of (ex-) users and survivors of psychiatry. Asylum–The Magazine for Democratic Psychiatry (U.K.), 17(4), 11-13.
- Lehmann, P. (2010). How to withdraw from psychiatric drugs. Asylum–The Magazine for Democratic Psychiatry (U.K.), 17(2), 29-31.
- Lehmann, P. (2010). Medicalization and irresponsibility. Journal of Critical Psychology, Counselling and Psychotherapy (U.K.), 10(4), 209-217.
- Lehmann, P. (2010). International noncompliance and humanistic antipsychiatry. In K. Bairaktaris (Ed.), Proceedings of the European Congress against Discrimination and Stigma, for User-Orientated Reforms in Psychiatry and the Right to Alternatives (pp. 63–72). Thessaloniki: Aristotle University of Thessaloniki ISBN 978-960-88503-5-4.
- Lehmann, P. (2010). Resisting psychiatric assault: A European initiative to introduce a suicide register. In B. Burstow & S. Diamond (Eds.), Proceedings of the PsychOUT-conference, May 7–8, 2010. Toronto: Ontario Institute for Studies in Education, University of Toronto 2010.
- Lehmann, P. (2009). Variety instead of stupidity: About the different positions within the movement of (ex-) users and survivors of psychiatry. Journal of Critical Psychology, Counselling and Psychotherapy (U.K.), 9(4), 197-204.
- Lehmann, P. (2007). From the madhouse to the warmth of others. aaina—A mental health advocacy newsletter (India), 7(3), 9-12.
- Lehmann, P. (2005). All about PSY DREAM: Psychiatric drug registration, evaluation and all-inclusive monitoring. Epidemiologia e Psichiatria Sociale, 14(1), 15-21.
- Lehmann, P. (2002). Treatment-induced suicide: Suicidality as a potential effect of psychiatric drugs. Journal of Critical Psychology, Counselling and Psychotherapy (U.K.), 2(1), 54-58.
- Lehmann, P. (2001). Coming off neuroleptics. In C. Newnes, G. Holmes & C. Dunn (Eds.), This is Madness Too: Critical perspectives on mental health services (pp. 81–91). Ross-on-Wye: PCCS Books ISBN 978-1-898059-37-0.
- Lehmann, P. (2000). Manage or perish? Or choosing to live without neuroleptic drugs? In J. Guimón & N. Sartorius (Eds.), Manage or Perish? The challenges of managed mental health care in Europe (pp. 469–474). New York / Boston / Dordrecht / London / Moscow: Kluwer Adacemic / Plenum Publishers ISBN 978-0-306-46210-8.
- Lehmann, P. (1999). Promotion of mental health and prevention of mental disorders by empowerment: Is there a psychiatry-policy without meaningful participation of (ex-) users/survivors of psychiatry? In J. Lavikainen, E. Lahtinen & V. Lehtinen (Eds.), Proceedings of the European Conference on Promotion of Mental Health and Social Inclusion, 10–13 October 1999, Tampere, Finland (pp. 108–110). Helsinki: Ministry of Social Affairs and Health ISBN 952-00-0896-9.
- Lehmann, P. (1999). Psychiatric emergency-treatment: Help against one's will or action of professional violence? In M. De Clercq, A. Andreoli, S. Lamarre & P. Forster (Eds.), Emergency Psychiatry in a Changing World: Proceedings of the 5th World Congress of the International Association for Emergency Psychiatry (pp. 95–104). Amsterdam / Lausanne / New York / Oxford / Shannon / Singapore / Tokyo: Elsevier ISBN 978-0-444-50017-5.
- Lehmann, P. (1998). Perspectives of (ex-) users and survivors of psychiatry. In E. Lahtinen (Ed.), Mental Health Promotion on the European Agenda. Report from a Consultative Meeting, 15–16 January 1998, Helsinki, Finland (pp. 63–68). Helsinki: STAKES Publications ISBN 951-33-0681-X.
- Lehmann, P. (1998). Remarks and points to be added to the Declaration of Madrid (World Psychiatric Association). In The Voiceless Movement / Les Sans-Voix (Ed.), Deprived of Our Humanity: The case against neuroleptic drugs (pp. 159–162). Geneva: Association Ecrivains, Poètes & Cie. ISBN 978-2-88462-039-0.
- Lehmann, P. (1998). Withdrawal symptoms connected with cessation of psychiatric drugs. In The Voiceless Movement / Les Sans-Voix (Ed.), Deprived of Our Humanity: The case against neuroleptic drugs (pp. 73–80). Geneva: Association Ecrivains, Poètes & Cie. ISBN 978-2-88462-039-0.
- Lehmann, P. (1994). "Progressive" psychiatry: Publisher J. F. Lehmann as promoter of social psychiatry under fascism. Changes–An International Journal of Psychology and Psychotherapy (U.K.), 12(1), 37-49.
- Lehmann, P. & Kempker, K. (1993). Unconventional approaches to psychiatry. Clinical Psychology Forum (U.K.), (51), 28-29.
