= Silvano Arieti =

Italian psychiatrist (1914–1981)

Silvano Arieti (June 28, 1914 in Pisa, Italy – August 7, 1981 in New York City) was a psychiatrist regarded as one of the world's foremost authorities on schizophrenia. He received his M.D. from the University of Pisa and left Italy soon after, due to the increasingly antisemitic racial policies of Benito Mussolini.

Arieti was professor of psychiatry at New York Medical College. He was also training analyst in the Division of Psychoanalysis at the William Alanson White Institute, and editor of the six-volume American Handbook of Psychiatry. His Interpretation of Schizophrenia won the 1975 National Book Award in Science. His The Will to be Human won the 1973 National Book Award in Philosophy and Religion category.

Arieti undertook psychotherapy of schizophrenic patients, an unusual approach that few of his colleagues chose to pursue. His work was considered in his time as a major revision of the concept of schizophrenia after Kraeplin and Bleuler. The views he expressed in Interpretation of Schizophrenia reflected a comprehensive biopsychosocial approach to the disorder, which contrasted with the firmly biological approach taken by many other mid-century psychiatrists. Childhood anxieties and psychological experiences by the child were considered a primary cause of later-age development of schizophrenia. He advanced ideas from the psychodynamic school, and his contributions became the foundations of much of the later work in psychotherapy of schizophrenia. Silvano Arieti is remembered as an intellectual giant who devoted his life to the care of the most seriously mentally ill.

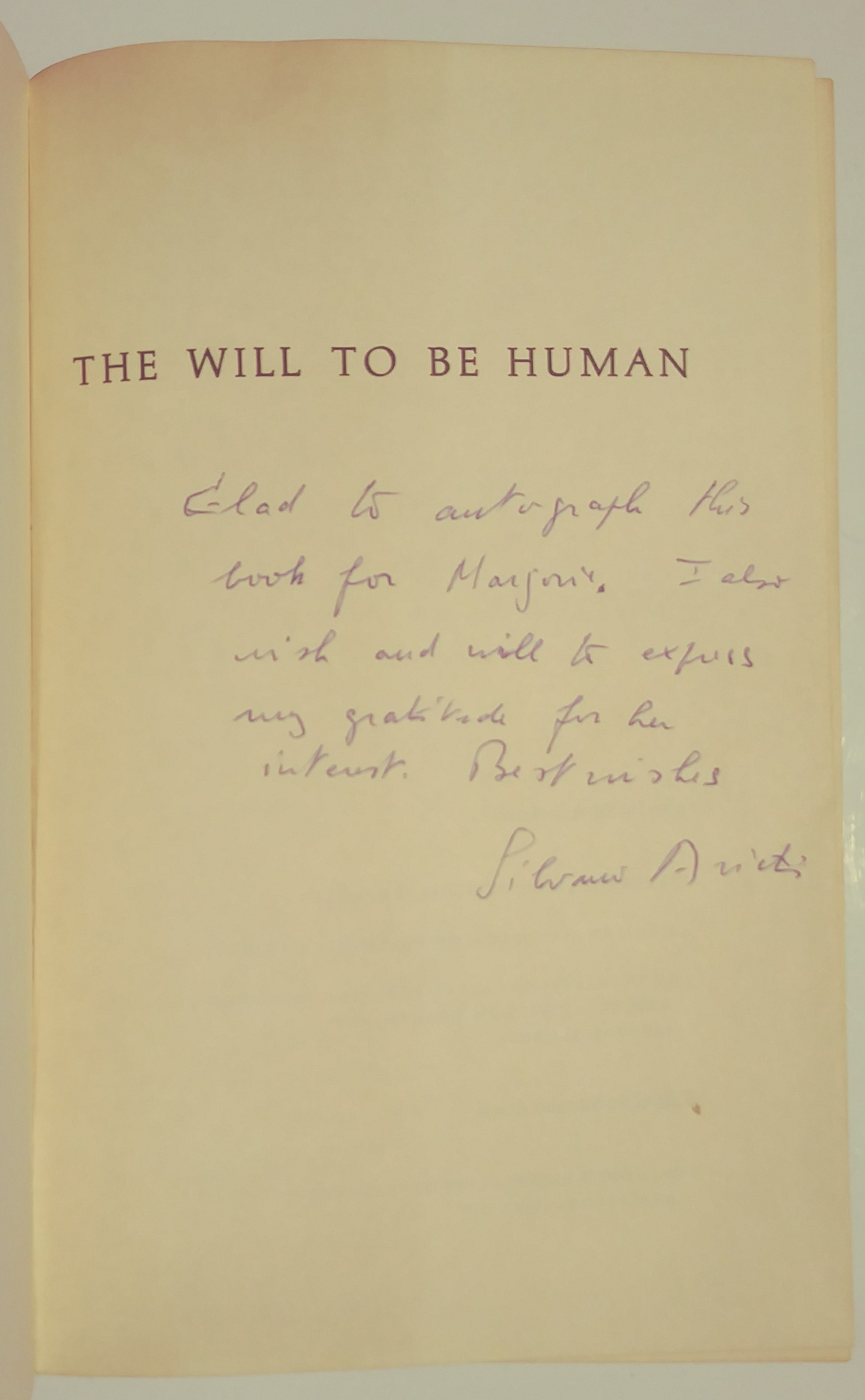
Arieti's book The Will to Be Human (signed copy)

== Treatment methods and Anti-Psychiatry misconceptions ==
Silvano Arieti is frequently erroneously associated with the anti-psychiatry movement, but this is a misconception, as he himself was never part of the movement, and in fact disapproved of the views of R. D. Laing regarding schizophrenia. In fact, Arieti himself supported the use of anti-psychotic medication in the treatment of people with schizophrenia, in order to make them more accessible to psychotherapy, and he frequently sent patients with disorganized schizophrenia to receive electroconvulsive shock therapy, in order to reduce their symptomatology. He wrote extensively on the use and efficacy of neuroleptics in Interpretation of Schizophrenia, and their benefit in treating patients.

Arieti mainly treated patients in the acute stage schizophrenia using psychotherapy, sometimes with additional neuroleptics, and described the difficulty in treating those in the chronic phase of the illness with the same methods, due to the crystallization of both the delusions and the psychotic way of thinking in this stage of the illness, and noted that the associated mental decline present at this stage also makes treatment with psychotherapy difficult. He also explored the behavior and symptomatology of those in the pre-terminal stages of the illness, and the eventual terminal stage, noting that patients in these stages are rarely seen in modern times, thanks to the widespread use of neuroleptic medication, which prevent such levels of regression.

== See also ==
- Interpretation of Schizophrenia
