= Association of Musical Marxists =

British political and cultural organisation

The Association of Musical Marxists (AMM) was a London-based cultural and political organisation active from 2010 to 2015. The organisation was formed by former Socialist Workers Party (UK) (SWP) members, including writer Ben Watson and Andy Wilson, to combine revolutionary politics with free improvisation and avant-garde music.

The AMM resisted professionalisation of both politics and the arts, endorsing instead radical and revolutionary history, creative improvisation, and mutual enjoyment. Its events were collective and combined political argument, reading of poetry, musical improvisation, and drinking, with a wish to overcome political-cultural boundaries. The AMM manifesto encouraged loyalty to revolutionary art and rejection of what they perceived as commodification of culture. They advocated the adoption of high-quality music as an example of restructuring human beings and as an entrance to the dialectic.

By combining improvised music and revolutionary politics, the AMM sought to subvert careerism and establish "both revolutionary art and the dictatorship of the proletariat, and Unkant Books are an attempt to fuse these two explosive concepts." Ultimately, however, political disagreements led to the AMM's demise.

Many people spoke, read or performed at AMM meetings including, Ben Watson ("Out To Lunch"), Andy Wilson, Keith Fisher, Sean Bonney, Oscillatorial Binnage, Helene le Bohec, Nina Power, Ben "Chewing Gum Man" Wilson, Dave Black, Esther Leslie, Robert Dellar, Alastair Kemp, Alternative TV.

== Unkant Publishing ==
The AMM was closely tied to Unkant Publishing which was a radical imprint launched by its members. From 2011 to 2015, Unkant published 14 titles ranging from political theory, revolutionary history, poetry and musicology. After the dissolution of the AMM and Unkant's closure in 2015, many of its authors found themselves "out of print and homeless."

The AMM advocated for a communal politics establishing links with the Psychedelic Bolsheviks in Sheffield, Assoziation Daemmerung in Berlin, the Occupy Movement, London students protesting tuition fees and the Rab-Rab Collective in Helsinki. Unkant published revolutionary history such as Helen Macfarlane's journalism, about the Chartists in 1839, Raymond Challinor's book on World War Two, Sheila Lahr's wartime memoirs, and others on musicology, psychiatry and politics. It also published poetry and hosted performances by Sean Bonney and Ken Fox.

One of Unkant's most significant contributions was the publication of the book, "1839: The Chartist Insurrection" by David Black and Chris Ford (2012). It is a Marxist reinterpretation of the revolutionary fervour surrounding the Chartist movement in Britain. While overlooked by mainstream reviewers, the book drew praise from across radical and fringe media. Ben Watson described it as "a revolutionary handbook," and John McDonnell MP, in the foreword to the book, commended on its detailed research and its challenge to dominant Labour histories. Dan La Botz, writing in New Politics, called it "fast-paced" and praised its "masterful command of the sources." Historian, Stephen Roberts found it politically committed and compelling. James Heartfield in Spiked Online admired its unapologetic focus on working-class agency and Adam Buick in the Socialist Standard acknowledged its vivid storytelling while offering a critical view of its revolutionary emphasis.

=== Unkant Books ===
- Adorno for Revolutionaries by Ben Watson (2011). ISBN 9780956817600
- 1839: The Chartist Insurrection by David Black and Chris Ford (2012). ISBN 9780956817679
- More Years for the Locust: The Origins of the SWP by Jim Higgins (2012): An exploration of the origins of the Socialist Workers Party.
- Splitting in Two: Mad Pride & Punk Rock Oblivion by Robert Dellar (2014) ISBN 0992650909
- Socialism from Below: Writings from an Unfinished Tradition by Dave Renton (2013) ISBN 9780956817624
- Azmud: An Oily Saga on the Surface of the Wordbath in 5 Expired Generations by Ken Fox (2013). ISBN 9780956817648
- Psycho Politics by Peter Sedgwick (2015). ISBN 9780992650957
- Yealm: A Sorterbiography by Sheila Lahr (2015). ISBN 9780992650940

== AMM All-Stars ==
Following the disbanding of the AMM, Ben Watson continued the group's musical ethos with drummer Peter Baxter calling the collective the AMM All-Stars. As a free improvisation ensemble it featured regulars such as Dave Black, Paul Shearsmith, Esther Leslie, and guest appearances with Jair-Rohm Parker Wells, Iain Sinclair, Guy Evans, Sam Amant, John Plant and artist and sculpture Eleanor Crook.

AMM All-Stars have performed at international festivals like Zappanale. At Zappanale's 30th anniversary, under the musical direction of Graham Davis (Mint Douche and Gabba Zappa Hey!), they performed a recomposition of Frank Zappa's album Lumpy Gravy. Journalist, Julian Cowley noted that recorded version the results "succeeds notably well" by oozing "a warm, almost homely feel".

Criticism of the AMM All-Stars remains fluid and wide-ranging. Chris Searle, writing in the Morning Star about their album In "This Scrumple No Taste is Fixed" wondered whether Karl Marx would have found their music "in kicking a stone against railings, splashing his boots in an open sewer or drumming on brickwork." In contrast, Massimo Ricci in Touching Extremes hears in their sound "hundreds of cues dictated by sheer memory, by recent or distant experiences, by the continuous urge to switch roles and mix instantaneous views." Richard Thomas in The Wire described one Cafe Oto gig as an "anaemic chicken coup squabble".

Collaborations with AMM All-Stars and their aesthetic philosophy were profiled in publications like The Wire, Herri, and Rab-Rab Journal. They have cultivated international collaborations with improvising collectives in South Africa and Australia. In 2023, they worked with the Africa Open Institute on xenochronic sound experiments. Earlier projects included cross-hemispheric recordings with Australian group "Music With My Insane Friend", expanding AMM's collaborations across borders.

The group remains committed to the AMM's founding spirit by subverting form and the merging of music and Marxism. They broadcast live and regular on shows such as Late Lunch with Out to Lunch on Resonance FM and The OTL Show on Soho Radio.
