= Memoirs of a Revolutionist (disambiguation) =

Memoirs of a Revolutionist is Peter Kropotkin's 1899 autobiography.

It may also refer to:

- Memoirs of a Revolutionist (Figner), the autobiography of Russian revolutionary activist Vera Figner
- Memoirs of a Revolutionary, 1901–1941, the autobiography of Russian revolutionary Victor Serge
