= Boris Kagarlitsky =

Russian sociologist and publicist

- Борис Кагарлицкий
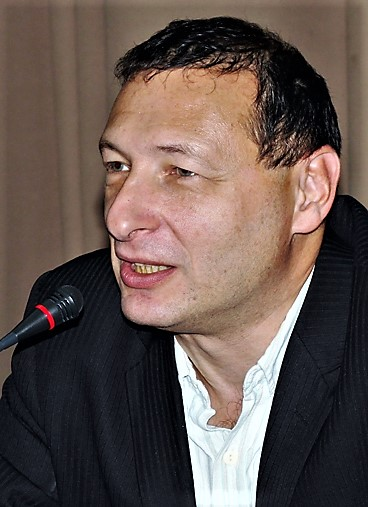
- Kagarlitsky in 2011
- Born: 29 August 1958 (age 68); Moscow, Russian SFSR, Soviet Union

Education
- Education: State Institute of Theatrical Art (GITIS); Moscow State Social University

Philosophical work
- Era: Contemporary philosophy
- Region: Western philosophy Russian philosophy
- School: Marxism; World-systems theory
- Main interests: Philosophy, sociology, labour, history, class struggle
- Boris Kagarlitsky's voice Kagarlitsky on the Echo of Moscow program, 26 October 2013

Boris Yulyevich Kagarlitsky (Russian: Бори́с Ю́льевич Кагарли́цкий; born 29 August 1958) is a Russian Marxist theoretician and sociologist who has been a political dissident in the Soviet Union and the Russian Federation. He is an associate of the Transnational Institute. Kagarlitsky is the director of Institute of Globalisation Studies and Social Movements (IGSO), as well as editor in chief of Levaya Politika (Left Politics) quarterly in Moscow. Kagarlitsky founded online platform Rabkor which has a YouTube channel and an online newspaper of the same name. He is widely known as a critic of capitalism and imperialism.

== Political activities ==
=== Soviet Union ===
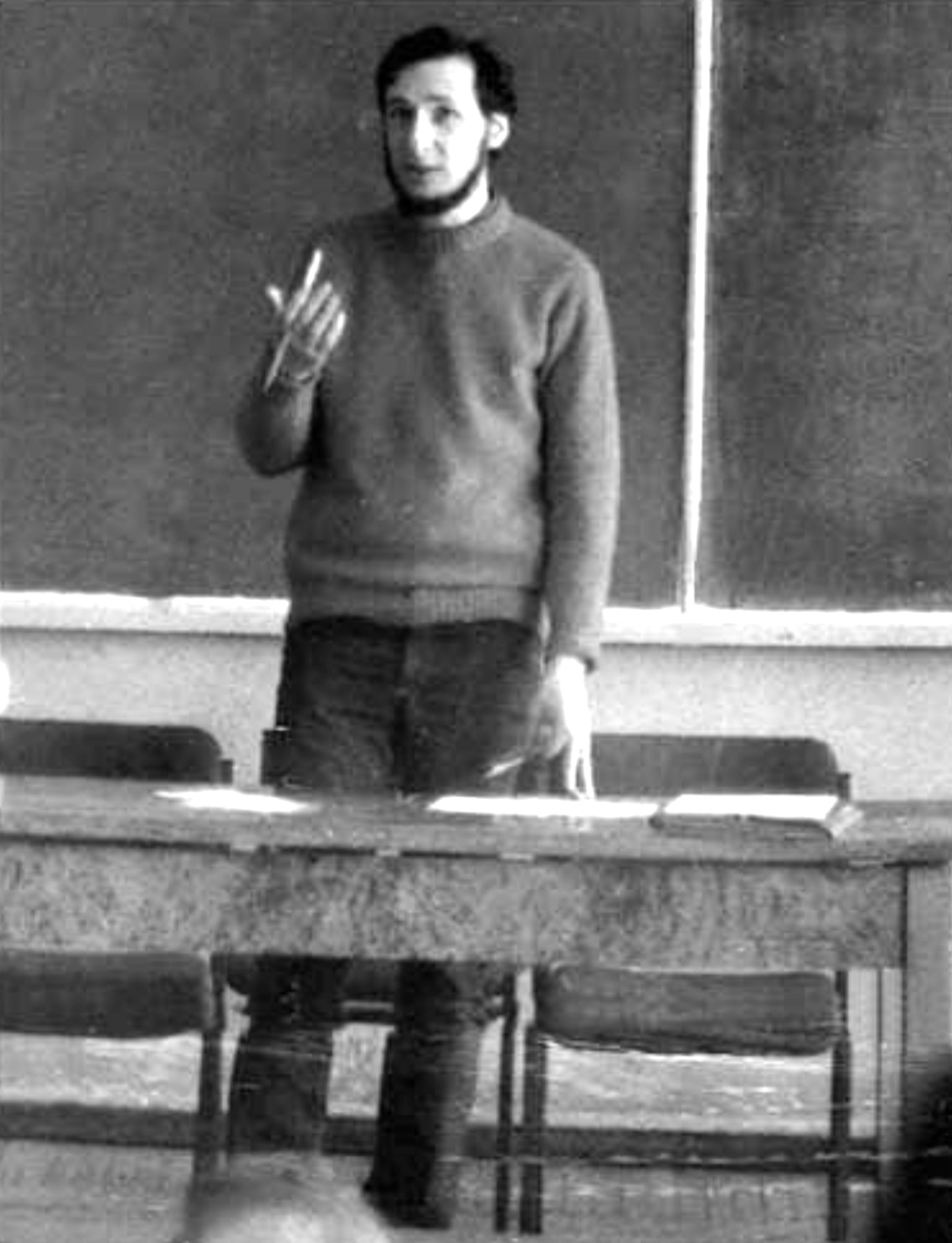
Kagarlitsky, aged 22, in 1980

In the 1970s, Kagarlitsky studied theatre criticism at the State Institute of Theatrical Art (GITIS), before being expelled for dissident activities in 1980. His editorship of the samizdat journal Levy Povorot (Left Turn) from 1978 to 1982, and contributions to the samizdat journal Varianty (Variants) during the same period, led to his arrest for 'anti-Soviet' activities in 1982. He was pardoned and released in 1983. In 1988, he published his book, Thinking Reed: Intellectuals and the Soviet State from 1917 to the Present, which won the Deutscher Memorial Prize. Also in 1988, after the rise of Mikhail Gorbachev and perestroika, he was permitted to resume his studies at the GITIS, graduating in the same year, and became coordinator of the Moscow People's Front. In 1990, he was elected to the Moscow City Soviet and to the Executive of the Socialist Party (USSR).

=== Russian Federation ===
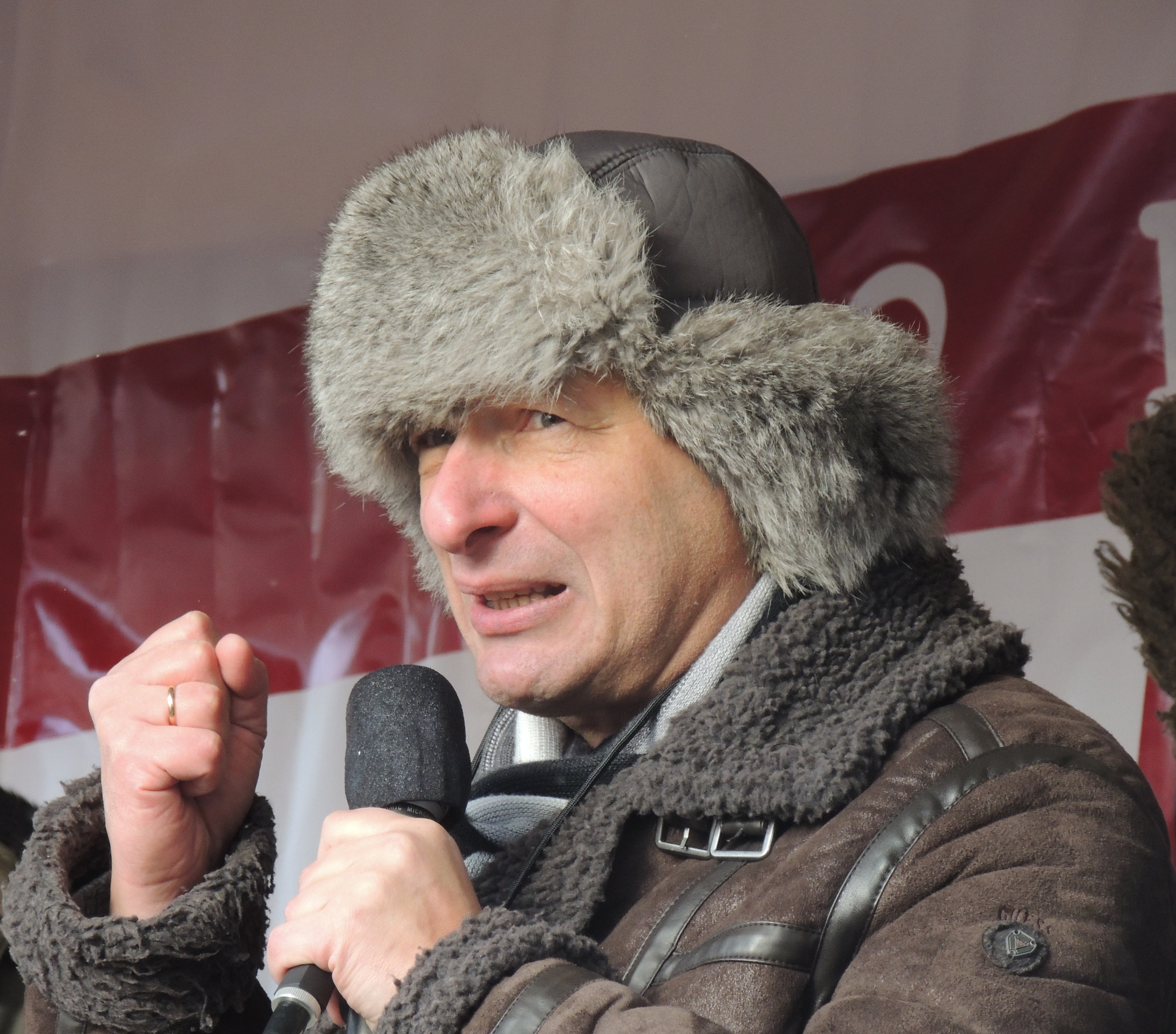
Kagarlitsky speaking at Moscow opposition rally "For the social rights of Muscovites", 2 March 2013

Kagarlitsky co-founded the Party of Labour in October 1992. In October 1993, the former Soviet dissident was arrested, with two other members of his party, for his opposition to President Boris Yeltsin during the 1993 Russian constitutional crisis, but was released the next day after international protests. Later that year, his job and the Moscow City Soviet were abolished under Yeltsin's new constitution. He documents the events and his experiences during this period in his book Square Wheels: How Russian Democracy Got Derailed. His 2005 historical essay Marxism: Not Recommended for Teaching was criticized by Mikhail Vasilyevich Popov.

=== Imprisonment ===
In 2022, Kagarlitsky condemned the Russian invasion of Ukraine. Also in 2022, Russian authorities designated Kagarlitsky as a foreign agent. On 25 July 2023, Russia's Federal Security Service opened a criminal case against Kagarlitsky. As part of a wider crackdown on outspoken critics of the 2022 Russian invasion of Ukraine, he was arrested on charges of "justifying terrorism" on 26 July 2023 according to Russian state agencies. In December 2023, he was charged 600,000 rubles fine on this charge. In February 2024, his sentence was changed to five years' detention in a prison colony.

After his arrest in 2023, the Kagarlitsky Solidarity Committee was formed and signed by public and political figures around the world: Jean-Luc Mélenchon, Jeremy Corbyn, Slavoj Žižek, Nadya Tolokonnikova, and many others. Suzi Weissman, an American scholar of Soviet and Russian politics, has publicized Kagarlitsky's cause in American left publications, and coauthored an article with Kagarlitsky about the defeat of Victor Orban's Hungarian government in 2026.

== Academic career ==
From 1994 to 2002, Kagarlitsky was a senior research fellow at the Institute for Comparative Political Studies of the Russian Academy of Sciences (ISPRAN). He was awarded his Doctorate degree for his thesis, "Collective Actions and Labour Policies in Russia in the 90s", in 1995, and has taught political science at Moscow State University, the Moscow School for Social and Economic Sciences, and the Institute of Sociology of the Russian Academy of Sciences.

== Rabkor ==
In 2008, Kagarlitsky was co-founder of the Russian online leftist media platform Rabkor, short for "Rabochiy Korrespondent" (Worker Correspondent). It is a Russian multimedia platform that advocates for progressive democratic views, and is characterised as an intersection between academic research and political activism. The platform encompasses a website, YouTube channel, and Telegram channel. Rabkor has been influential in uniting individuals with diverse left-wing and pro-democratic perspectives.

Rabkor's stance on the Russo-Ukrainian war shifted significantly over time. Initially, it supported Russia's annexation of Crimea and the Donbas separatist movements, viewing them as progressive and anti-imperialist. However, after Russia's full-scale invasion of Ukraine in 2022, Rabkor strongly opposed the war, criticizing Russia's military actions and calling for anti-war agitation. This shift reflects a major ideological realignment in its editorial stance. Also in 2022, Kagarlitsky and Rabkor convened the Anti-War Round Table of the Left Forces, which unequivocally condemned the invasion and called for anti-war agitation among Russian citizens.

== Personal life ==
According to Kagarlitsky, his paternal family descends from Ilya Kagarlitsky, a successful Jewish businessman from the city of Kaharlyk in Ukraine. His mother comes from an Orthodox Christian family. He has a daughter, Ksenia.

== Books in English ==
- Thinking Reed: Intellectuals and the Soviet State from 1917 to the Present, Verso Books, 1989, ISBN 0860919617
- The Dialectic of Change, Verso Books, 1990, ISBN 0860919617
- Farewell Perestroika: A Soviet Chronicle, Verso Books, 1990, ISBN 0860912922
- The Disintegration of the Monolith, Verso Books, 1993, ISBN 0860915735
- Square Wheels: How Russian Democracy Got Derailed, Monthly Review Press, 1994, ISBN 0853458928
- Mirage of Modernization, Monthly Review Press, 1995, ISBN 0853459126
- Restoration in Russia: Why Capitalism Failed, Verso Books, 1995, ISBN 1859849628
- Globalization and Its Discontents: The Rise of Postmodern Socialisms, co-edited with Roger Burbach and Orlando Nunez, Pluto Press, 1997, ISBN 0745311709
- New Realism, New Barbarism: Socialist Theory in the Era of Globalization, Pluto Press, 1999, ISBN 0745315569
- The Return of Radicalism: Reshaping the Left Institutions, Pluto Press, 1999, ISBN 0745315917
- The Twilight of Globalization: Property, State and Capitalism, Pluto Press, 2000, ISBN 074531581X
- Russia Under Yeltsin and Putin: Neo-Liberal Autocracy, Pluto Press, 2002, ISBN 0745315070
- The Politics of Empire: Globalisation in Crisis, co-edited with Alan Freeman, Pluto Press, 2004, ISBN 0745321836
- Empire of the Periphery: Russia and the World System, Pluto Press, 2007, ISBN 074532682X
- Back in the USSR (What Was Communism?), Seagull Books, 2009, ISBN 9781906497279
- From Empires to Imperialism: The State and the Rise of Bourgeois Civilisation, Routledge, 2014, ISBN 9781138778856
- Russia, Ukraine and Contemporary Imperialism, Routledge, 2019, ISBN 0367231085
- Between Class and Discourse: Left Intellectuals in Defence of Capitalism, Routledge, 2020, ISBN 0367562707
- The Long Retreat: Strategies to Reverse the Decline of the Left, Pluto Press, 2024, ISBN 9780745350288

Awards
Preceded by Teodor Shanin	Deutscher Memorial Prize; 1988	Succeeded by Terry Eagleton
