= We Can =

We Can may refer to:

- We Can! (Croatia), a political party in Croatia
- "We Can" (song), by LeAnn Rimes, 2003
- "We Can", a song by James Morrison from Higher Than Here, 2015
- "We Can", a song by Kranium, 2016
- "We Can", a song by Ted Poley and Tony Harnell from Sonic Heroes, 2004

== See also ==
- Yes We Can (disambiguation)
- We Can Do It!, an American image and slogan
- Podemos (disambiguation) (Spanish and Portuguese for 'We can')
