= Suzi Weissman =

American socialist scholar and radio host

- Born: Susan Weissman; January 2, 1949 (age 77); United States
- Education: University of Glasgow
- Occupations: Political commentator, journalist, radio host, professor
- Years active: 1970s–present
- Employer: Saint Mary's College of CA
- Known for: Hosting Beneath the Surface and Jacobin Radio
- Notable work: Victor Serge: The Course Is Set on Hope; John Reed and the Russian Revolution
- Title: Host of Beneath the Surface
- Board member of: Against the Current; Critique

Suzi Weissman (born January 2, 1949) is an American radio host, journalist, historian, and activist focusing on Soviet and post-Soviet Russian politics, international revolutionary and labor movements, and American progressive and labor movements. She is best known as the leading biographer of the Bolshevik Revolutionary writer Victor Serge, and as the longtime host of Beneath the Surface on KPFK Pacifica Radio Los Angeles, which podcasts via Jacobin Radio.

Weissman is professor emerita of politics at Saint Mary’s College of California. Her writing has appeared widely on topics including foreign policy, labor movements, and post-Soviet politics, and she has served as an editor of the journals Against the Current and Critique: Journal of Socialist Theory.

== Academic career ==
A native of Great Falls, Montana, Weissman earned her A.B. in English from Stanford University in 1972, her M.Phil. in Soviet Studies in 1976 and Ph.D. from the Institute of Soviet and East European Studies at the University of Glasgow in 1991 with a dissertation about Victor Serge. She moved to Los Angeles in 1979 and started her broadcasting career at KPFK in 1981. She taught Modern History in the Liberal Studies Department at Otis College of Art & Design of the New School for Social Research from 1986 to 1992 and was Professor of Politics at Saint Mary's College of California from 1992 to 2023. receiving the college's Distinguished Service Award before her retirement. Continuing to live in Los Angeles, Weissman flew to the Bay Area to teach classes.

=== Victor Serge biography ===
Weissman is a leading expert on Victor Serge who was a significant Bolshevik Revolutionary, Left Opposition activist and literary author. Weissman has documented how Serge promoted an anti-authoritarian version of socialism during the Revolution, during the rise of Stalin, and in exile, arguing "Serge’s political experience led him not to renounce socialism once Stalin had triumphed, but to bring to it a declaration of the rights of man, enriching socialist goals."

Among other early projects related to Victor Serge, she translated an article by the Spanish POUM militant Wilebaldo Solano on his 1939 meeting with Serge in Paris where they were both in exile, later also writing an obituary for Solano.

Weissman's 2001 book Victor Serge: The Course Is Set on Hope was featured on the cover of the Sunday Books edition of the Los Angeles Times, with a review by Christopher Hitchens.

Hitchens states 'Biography has many tasks, the most salient of which is obviously the recreation of a human personality for subsequent generations. Sometimes, this duty takes the form of a rescue operation, by which the record of an important life is prevented from toppling into oblivion. And sometimes, too, it is necessary to redeem a reputation from calumny. At the point where this is done properly, biography may shade into history and alter the way in which we view an epoch. Susan Weissman's study of Victor Serge meets all the above conditions.'" The book was also reviewed by The Times Literary Supplement, along with many academic journals and left publications.

Weissman repeatedly attempted to visit Mark Zborowski, a Soviet spy who infiltrated and caused discord in exiled Trotskyist circles, to question him for the Victor Serge project. He slammed the door in her face. She subsequently wrote a two part study of Zborowski, Stalin's master spy in the Left Opposition in exile.

The Serge biography's second expanded edition was published as Victor Serge: A Political Biography in 2013 with an editorial review by Adam Hochschild. and additional reviews by Christopher Hitchens, Italian political philosopher Antonio Negri and Russian poet Yevgeny Yevtushenko. Yevtushenko stated: "This is a unique book about a unique man, Victor Serge, who, in being one of the first to fight for a truly humanitarian socialism, was punished for his shame at the betrayal of the revolution he so longed for."

Weissman traveled to the Soviet Union with Victor Serge's son, Vlady Kibalchich, in 1989 as part of a delegation representing the families of Leon Trotsky and Victor Serge, seeking their rehabilitation during the period of Gorbachev's glasnost. She was also close to Leon Trotsky's grandson, Sieva Volkov, who endorsed Weissman's efforts to preserve historical footage of Trotsky. She is co-producer of the David Weiss–Lindy Laub documentary film project Trotsky, the Most Dangerous Man in the World, in which Esteban "Sieva" Volkov is extensively featured.

== Broadcasting career ==
Weissman has hosted talk shows on KPFK in Los Angeles since 1981, beginning with Portraits of the USSR and Read All About It. Her current weekly program Beneath the Surface beginning in 1994. The program is described by KPFK as consisting of interviews with "thinkers and activists" on topics ranging from "the breakup of the USSR and shifting politics in Eastern Europe, to global financial crises and their aftermath, labor struggles and working-class politics, the history of socialism and experiments in social change, and mass uprisings from the Arab Spring and Occupy to Syriza, Podemos, and the rise of right-wing populism."

Weissman began podcasting Jacobin Radio in early 2017. The inaugural podcast episode was an interview with Robert Brenner and Bhaskar Sunkara about the future of the Left after Trump's 2016 election. Other Jacobin Radio interviews have included Paul Mason on the British Labor Party after the 2017 election, David Graeber on Bullshit Jobs. Tariq Ali on multiple occasions including for his book on Lenin. and Nelson Lichtenstein on the UAW strike.

== Activism against the current Russian regime ==
Weissman has used her editorial and radio platforms to criticize the Putin regime from an explicitly left perspective. She hosted a notable panel discussion about the Ukraine War in April 2022 and interviewed the historian Simon Pirani about the roots of the Russian war against Ukraine.

Weissman has publicized the cause of the Russian political prisoner Boris Kagarlitsky, including writing for major American left magazines including The Nation and Jacobin In April 2026, Weissman co-authoreed an article with Kagarlitsky (from prison) about the defeat of Victor Orban in Hungarian elections, which was published by The Nation.

== Other writing and activism ==
Weissman was an associate editor of Larry Flynt's short-lived political newsweekly The Rebel in 1983-84.

While living in the UK in the 1970s, Weissman was associated with the International Marxist Group and was later associated with Solidarity movement. She has been a long-term editor of Against the Current which has been a frequent venue for her writing about Soviet history, contemporary Russia, the US labor movement, and political struggles around the world, along with interviews and remembrances of activists including written versions of Beneath the Surface interviews. Subjects for her interviews include Iranian Marxist Mansoor Hekmat in 1992, titled "Socialism Is Not Stalinism", Gilbert Achcar about the aftermath of the invasion of Iraq in 2006 and Thomas Frank on corruption.

She has also served as an Editor and writer for Critique: Journal of Socialist Theory, founded by her graduate school mentors at University of Glasgow.

Weissman has served on the Board of the Daniel Singer Prize Foundation since it was established in 2001, the year after Singer's death. It sponsors an annual prize for an essay "that is written in the spirit and with the elegance Daniel exemplified as a writer and man of action."

Weissman received the 1999 Movers and Shakers Award for Journalism from the Southern California Library of Social Studies and Research.

Weissman's work for the American labor movement includes a 2014 article for Jacobin Magazine with Robert Brenner on the decreasing frequency of strikes an example of weakening unions.

Following a 2018 fire in Malibu, Weissman interviewed Mike Davis for Jacobin, correctly predicting future fires without systemic reform.

== Personal life ==
Weissman met her first husband Roberto Naduris while they were both living in Scotland in the 1970s. Before their marriage they lived in a flat with several other students including Mike Davis. Naduris was a refugee from the Pinochet dictatorship in Chile. They had two children, Eli and Natalia. Roberto Naduris died of a heart attack in 1995. Weissman later married the Marxist historian Robert Brenner, a long time friend.
