= Peter Sedgwick =

English translator (1934–1983)

- Born: Peter Harold Sedgwick; 9 March 1934; Liverpool, England
- Died: 8 September 1983 (aged 49); Shipley, West Yorkshire, England
- Education: Balliol College, Oxford
- Occupations: Author; translator
- Years active: 1956–1983

Peter Harold Sedgwick (9 March 1934 – 8 September 1983) was an English translator of Victor Serge, author of a number of books including PsychoPolitics and a revolutionary socialist activist.

== Early life ==
Peter Sedgwick grew up in Liverpool and won a scholarship to Balliol College, Oxford, where he became a member of the Communist Party of Great Britain.

== Career ==
In 1956, after the Hungarian Revolution, he left and joined the Socialist Review Group, later the International Socialists (forerunners of the Socialist Workers Party). He wrote for the group's press while also getting involved in the activities of rank-and-file members. He was opposed to the International Socialists' renaming themselves the Socialist Workers Party in January 1977 and refused to join the new organisation. However, he remained dedicated to the left. Christopher Hitchens called him "a noble remnant of the libertarian left" and dedicated his book Letters to a Young Contrarian (2001) to Sedgwick's memory.

For the 15 years until his death Sedgwick earned his living as a lecturer in politics at the Universities of York and Leeds.

In his book PsychoPolitics (1982) he argued that the severe reductions in psychiatric services that were already taking place as a result of the "politically correct" conceptions of mental illness, such as those of the anti-psychiatry writers Michel Foucault, R.D. Laing and Thomas Szasz, were actually being pursued by governments anxious to reduce spending on health care. Ben Watson has compared the spirit of Sedgwick's work to the later campaigns of the Mad Pride movement.

== Death ==
Sedgwick was found dead on 8 September 1983, aged 49, in a canal near his home in Shipley, West Yorkshire. He was editing some of the works of Victor Serge at the time of his death.

== Selected writings ==
- Translation (with introduction) of Victor Serge's Memoirs of a Revolutionary (1963)
- "George Orwell: International Socialist?" (1969: the second part of this article was promised, but has never been published)
- PsychoPolitics (Pluto Press, 1982, 2nd edition 1987) New edition, Unkant, July 2015.
- "The Unhappy Elitist: Victor Serge’s Early Bolshevism" (1984)
