= Laurette Séjourné =

Mexican archeologist and ethnologist (1914–2003)

Laurette Séjourné (L'Aquila, October 24, 1914 – Mexico City, May 25, 2003) was a Mexican archeologist and ethnologist best known for her study of the civilizations of Teotihuacan and the Aztecs and her theories concerning the Mesoamerican culture hero, Quetzalcoatl.

== Life ==
Laurette Séjourné was born in L'Aquila, Italy, as Laura Valentini Corsa, although one also finds her mentioned as Laura Bianchi. Little is known about her early years; even her precise birth-date is rarely mentioned. In her prime youth, she appears to have moved to France, perhaps in connection with Italy's fascist take-over of 1922; in later life, she still wrote in French. She married a French film editor, Bernard Séjourné, and participated in cultural life and in the world of the cinema, meeting such figures as André Breton and Jean Cocteau. Strongly politicized like many others at the time, she divorced her husband, and became the partner of Viktor Kibalchich or Kibaltchitch (Russian: Виктор Кибальчич, 1890–1947), a Russian novelist and revolutionary also known as Victor Serge. She left occupied France in 1942 to join him in exile in Mexico. There, she became a naturalized Mexican citizen and married him. Soon after his death, she joined the Mexican Communist Party. Later, she married Arnaldo Orfila, director of the Fondo de Cultura Económica and founder of Siglo XXI Editores.

Séjourné's militant spirit can be captured from a passage like the following one:

[In] spite of extreme demographic density and the lack of machinery and work animals, the members of Precolumbian societies enjoyed physical health, individual independence, security, some leisure, which implies a distribution of resources and an integration to the collectivity that in our days would seem a utopia. From all of this follows that if we refuse to analyze the invasion that destroyed a civilized world and laid the seed of a system in which hunger, humiliation, and bloody repression constitute the only form of survivorship, contemporary underdevelopment should be a result of congenital incapacity, of the irremediable racial inferiority that justified extermination and vassalage.

Later, her focus came to rest more and more on what to her was the embodiment of this Prehispanic 'utopia', Quetzalcoatl.

During the 1950s, Séjourné worked for Mexico's National Institute of Anthropology and History (INAH). She did anthropological fieldwork in Oaxaca, but then changed to the field of archaeology, excavating at the pre-Spanish metropolis of Teotihuacan, which she believed was the legendary Tollan. She published several beautifully illustrated books on the art and architecture of Teotihuacan. Although she was the first to recognize the discontinuity between Teotihuacan and the much later Aztec civilization, her archaeological work has been subject to criticism.

To a wider public she became known through her 1957 publication on the cosmology and religion of the Toltecs and Aztecs, translated into English as Burning Water: Thought and Religion in Ancient Mexico. The book's main focus is the figure of Tollan's priestly king, Quetzalcoatl, and his teachings. Five years later, there was a follow-up in Quetzalcoatls' Universe (Spanish: El Universo de Quetzalcoatl, 1962). Perhaps influenced by the ideas of Carl Jung, or by the historian of religion, Mircea Eliade, with whom Séjourné maintained a correspondence, these books sketch a rather spiritualized image of king Quetzalcoatl and his legendary reign, referring to "laws of interior preparation" supposedly left by the Toltec king and to advances "along the road to spirituality" made possible by these.

== Published works ==
- Palenque, una ciudad maya, Mexico, Fondo de Cultura Económica, 1952.
- Supervivencias de un mundo mágico, imágenes de 4 pueblos mexicanos, dessins de Leonora Carrington, Mexico, Tezontle, 1953.
- Pensamiento y religión en el México antiguo, Mexico, Fondo de Cultura Económica, 1957; English translation: Burning water, thought and religion in Ancient Mexico, Shambala 1976 [[[Thames & Hudson]], 1957]; La Pensée des anciens Mexicains, Paris, F. Maspero, 1966.
- Un Palacio en la ciudad de los dioses, Teotihuacán, Mexico, Instituto nacional de antropología e historia, 1959.
- El Universo de Quetzalcóatl, Fondo de Cultura Económica, 1962.
- Arqueología de Teotihuacán, la cerámica, Fondo de Cultura Económica, 1966.
- Teotihuacan, métropole de l'Amérique, Paris, F. Maspero, 1969.
- Antiguas culturas precolombinas, México, Siglo XXI de España editores, 1976.
- El Pensamiento náhuatl cifrado en los calendarios, Siglo XXI, 1983.
- Teotihuacan, capital de los Toltecas, Mexico, Siglo Veintiuno Editores, 1994
- Cosmogonia de Mesoamérica, Mexico, Siglo veintiuno editores, 2004.

Correspondence

- Ecris-moi à Mexico: correspondence inédite 1941–1942, Paris, Signes et balises, 2017. [Correspondence with Victor Serge]
