= Richard Greeman =

American Marxist scholar (born 1939)

Richard Greeman (born August 11, 1939, in New York City) is a Marxist scholar long active in human rights, anti-war, anti-nuclear, environmental, and labor struggles in the U.S., Latin America, France, and Russia. Greeman is best known for his studies and translations of the Franco-Russian novelist and revolutionary Victor Serge (1890–1947). He also writes regularly about politics, international class struggles, and revolutionary theory. Co-founder of the Praxis Research and Education Center in Moscow, Russia, and director of the International Victor Serge Foundation, Greeman splits his time between Montpellier, France and New York City.

== Early life and education ==
Greeman describes himself as a "Red-diaper grand baby" who inherited the socialist books and ideas of his maternal grandfather, Sam Levin, an immigrant Russian-Jewish tailor from Hartford, Connecticut. His father, Edward Greeman, was a decorated World War I ambulance driver, 1948 American Labor Party candidate for the New York State Assembly, and a member of Vietnam Veterans Against the War. Richard graduated from Mamaroneck High School in Mamaroneck, New York, in 1957, and entered Yale College, where as a freshman, he became active in the George Orwell Forum and joined the Young People's Socialist League.

During his 1959–60 junior year in Paris, he participated in the anti-Algerian War movement as a member of the group Socialisme ou Barbarie ("socialism or barbarism"). Returning to Yale in 1960, he helped found the New Haven chapters of the Congress of Racial Equality (CORE) and Fair Play for Cuba Committee. Greeman encountered Raya Dunayevskaya after reading her Marxism and Freedom and joined her Marxist-humanist organization News & Letters Committees, where he remained active until 1973, when he was ousted by the central leadership after being denied a hearing.

In 1961, Greeman enrolled at Columbia University, where as a graduate student and French teaching assistant, he was active in CORE, the Independent Committee Against the War in Vietnam, and Students for a Democratic Society. He participated in the 1968 Columbia University protests as a junior faculty member in support of the Strike Committee, and he received his Ph.D. at the "Counter-Commencement" on the student-occupied campus.

== Academic and political career ==
During 1963–64, Greeman returned to Paris with a French government scholarship, took courses at the Sorbonne, and began research on the life and works of Victor Serge (1890–1947), whom he admired as a novelist, a revolutionary witness, and a libertarian socialist thinker. In Paris, Greeman befriended Serge's son, the Russian-Mexican painter Vlady, who encouraged his research and authorized him to translate Serge's fiction into English. To date, Greeman has translated and introduced five Serge novels, including Unforgiving Years, which was voted one of Time Out New York's "Best of 2008". Greeman has also prefaced and edited a number of Serge's books in French.

From 1964 to 1970, Greeman taught French and humanities at Columbia College, then at Wesleyan University in Middletown, Connecticut, where he was active in anti-war, labor, and Black Panther defense groups, and helped organize the May 1970 student strike that occupied the university. In 1973, he was denied tenure in a controversial case. In 1975, he joined the faculty of the University of Hartford. Greeman was active in the Hartford Coalition for Justice in Central America, with CISPES and Nicaragua Network, and in the defense of the Macheteros—Puerto Rican socialist party defendants in the 1983 West Hartford Wells Fargo "Robin Hood" robbery. Greeman also traveled to Sandinista Nicaragua in the summer of 1984 to observe the elections and join Witness for Peace during the Contra war on the border of Honduras. Twice rejected for tenure at the University of Hartford, he won on appeal and retired to France in 1997 to devote himself to writing and political work.

== Projects in Russia ==
In 1991, during Russia's perestroika period, Greeman traveled to Saint Petersburg and Moscow as part of the first group of informali: U.S. political, labor, and environmental activists invited by their Russian counterparts. In 1993, he organized the "Books for Struggle" drive, collecting 88 boxes of non-Stalinist Left books and periodicals to be shipped to Russia. In 1997, he helped establish the Victor Serge Public Library in Moscow, and in 1998, he co-founded the Praxis Research and Education Center in Moscow, which promotes anti-totalitarian socialism in the ex-Soviet space. Praxis has published Serge's works for the first time in Russian translation as well as books by anarchists like Volin and libertarian Marxists like Maximilian Rubel and Raya Dunayevskaya. Praxis also publishes a newspaper, Free Thought, and holds annual international conferences.

== Writings ==
Greeman's essays on Serge have appeared in Yale French Studies, TriQuarterly, the Massachusetts Review, New Politics, Revolutionary History, International Socialism, ReThinking Marxism, and Vuelta (Mexico). His political writings deal with international politics (strikes in France, struggles in Russia, revolt in the Arab world, the Euro crisis, Marxist economics, and the theory of revolutionary self-organization.

Greeman's major essays have been collected in the book Beware of 'Vegetarian' Sharks: Radical Rants and Internationalist Essays. Reviewer Ian Birchall found Vegetarian Sharks a 'useful volume', containing 'much of interest to historians of the socialist movement', but 'excessively optimistic about the Internet' and 'poorly proofread'. Birchall described Greeman's critique of Leninism as 'nuanced' but 'weak because the alternative forms of organization he prefers are, on his own admission "ephemeral"'. Reviewer Eli Messinger 'found his candor refreshing. Greeman's is not a heavily footnoted, scholarly treatise. His lively style is likely to make this book particularly attractive to younger readers as will the high drama of Victor Serge's life story. [...] Greeman's work brings to light people and events in our recent past which deserve to be known by those struggling today.'
