= Charles Lahr =

German anarchist, bookseller and publisher

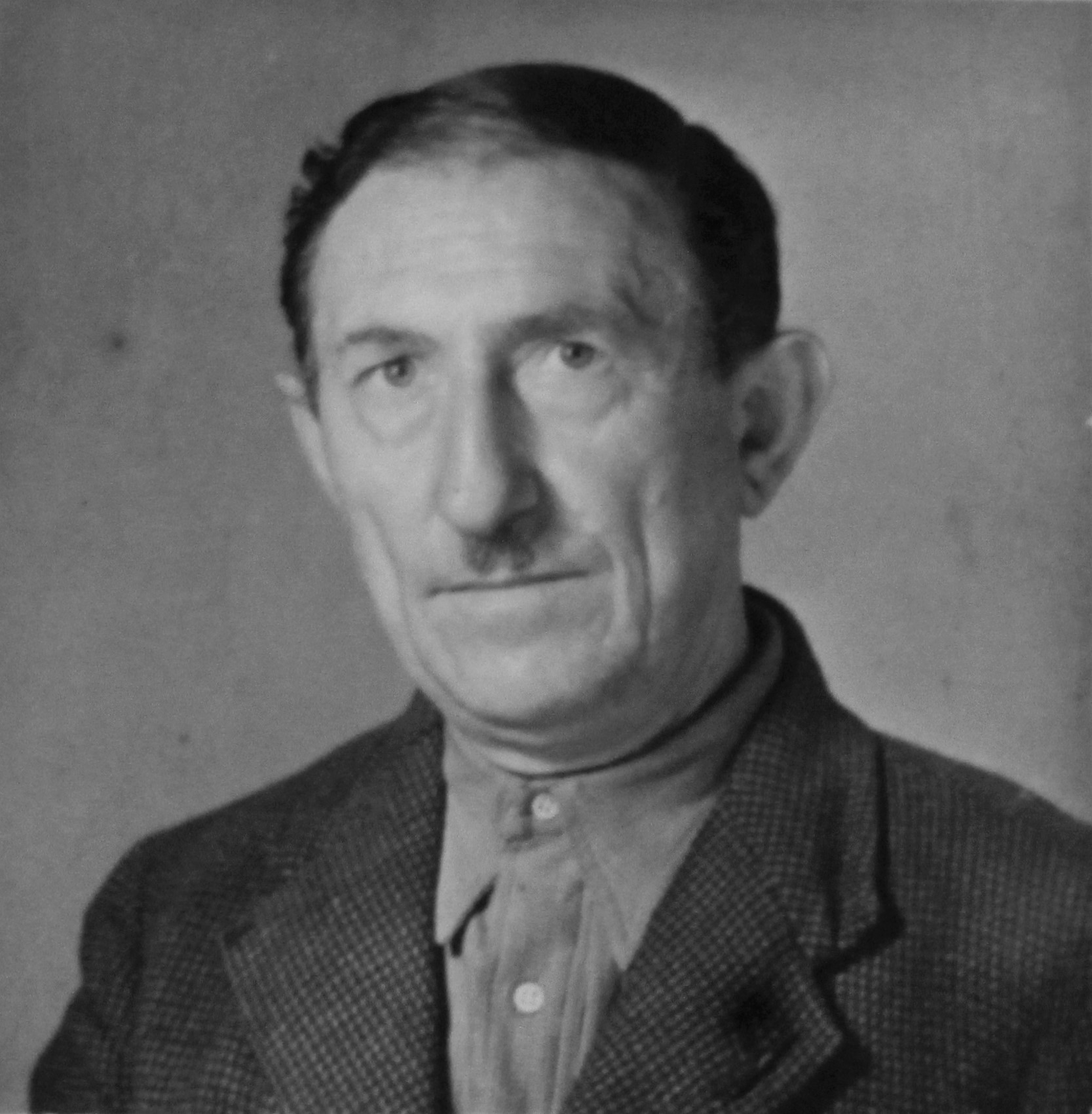
- Lahr in 1947
- Born: Carl Lahr; 27 July 1885; Bad Nauheim, Grand Duchy of Hesse, German Empire
- Died: 15 August 1971 (aged 86); Muswell Hill, London, England
- Citizenship: German, then stateless
- Occupations: Bookseller and publisher
- Movement: Anarchist
- Spouse: Esther Archer (m. 1922)

Charles Lahr (27 July 1885 – 15 August 1971), born Carl Lahr, was a German-born Jewish anarchist, London bookseller and publisher. He was born at Bad Nauheim in the Grand Duchy of Hesse, the eldest of 15 children "of peasant stock". He fled Germany in 1905 to evade military service and then went to London, where he lived until his death in 1971. In London, he was a member of several left-wing groups and established friendships with writers such as D. H. Lawrence. He was interned as an enemy alien during both world wars.

== Life in London ==
Lahr arrived in London stateless because he gave up his German citizenship. (Note: Lahr never became a British citizen. Consequently, he became and remained legally stateless. Osborne 2016, p. 134.) In London Lahr encountered the anarchist Guy Aldred while working as a baker. He was soon (1907) under police observation. He joined the Industrial Workers of the World in 1914; at that time he had a bookshop in Hammersmith.

In 1915, he was interned for four years as an enemy alien in Alexandra Palace. Between 1920 and 1922 he was briefly a member of the Communist Party of Great Britain, however, he was excluded from membership in October 1922 on the grounds of 'political unreliability'. His interest in politics led him to befriend many left-wing thinkers, several of whom went on to establish important left-wing groups in Great Britain. In 1921, he took over the Progressive Bookshop in Red Lion Street, Holborn. From there he would branch out into publishing, and establish many literary friendships including H. E. Bates, Rhys Davies, T. F. Powys and D. H. Lawrence. At one point, when Lahr was in financial difficulties, his writer friends gathered a collection of eighteen short stories by various authors and published them under the supposed editorship of Charles Wain (1933). (Note: The authors included T.F. Powys, H.E. Bates, Rhys Davies, Seán Ó Faoláin and John Hampson. p7 item 100 Charles WAIN)

Lahr was married in 1922 to Esther Argeband (née Archer), who he first met at the Charlotte Street Socialist Club. She was a Jewish factory worker from East London. They were close friends of William Roberts, the artist, and his wife. William's portrait of Esther is in the Tate Gallery. (Note: Lahr, Charles, 1885-1971 (Heath, 2004).)

From 1925 to 1927 Lahr published The New Coterie literary and artistic magazine. In 1931, he founded a small press, the Blue Moon Press. Amongst the books that Blue Moon published was the first edition of a small book of poems by D. H. Lawrence called Pansies.

In subsequent misfortunes, Lahr was convicted in 1935 on a charge of receiving stolen books and was sentenced to 6 months in prison. He was interned again in the Second World War. Lahr believed the internment was based on his German background and anarchist beliefs. In a short story from Something Short and Sweet (published 1937), H. E. Bates describes the court case, with Lahr called "Oscar" in the story. The bookshop was bombed in 1941. He moved its premises several times in London.

Lahr died at home in Muswell Hill, London on 15 August 1971. His funeral was attended by many representatives from left wing groups in the UK. Esther Leslie, Professor of Political Aesthetics at Birkbeck, University of London, is his granddaughter.

Lahr's papers are held by the University of London.
