= Ben Watson (music writer) =

British writer

Ben Watson (born 1956) is a British writer on music and culture of Marxist views, known especially for his writings on Frank Zappa.

Watson is well known as a regular contributor to The Wire, as well as the author of numerous books, often entailing studies of popular culture from the perspective of Marxist aesthetics. Watson was a member of the British Trotskyist Socialist Workers' Party; his writing combines this background together with influences from Theodor Adorno and the Frankfurt School, the Situationists and wider cultural interests including the writings of James Joyce and J.H. Prynne. His first full-length book, Frank Zappa: The Negative Dialectics of Poodle Play argued that Zappa's work was part of the protest against capitalist society. Watson calls his own field of study in this area Zappology. He is also an experimental poet and novelist; his first novel Shit-Kicks and Dough-Balls was published in 2003.

Watson's partner is the Marxist philosopher (and scholar of Walter Benjamin and Georg Lukács) Esther Leslie with whom he has collaborated on various works.

Watson has written of going 'mad' in 1984 and being 'sectioned' under the Mental Health Act, later finding inspiration in the Mad Pride movement which he likened to the earlier work 'Psycho-Politics' by the Marxist Peter Sedgwick.

Since 2003 Watson has broadcast a weekly radio show on Resonance FM called Late Lunch with Out To Lunch.

In 2010, he and Andy Wilson founded the Association of Musical Marxists; together with Keith Fisher the AMM started up the Unkant imprint. In 2015 Wilson and Watson parted ways, but Watson carried on with a musical unit named the AMM All-Stars featuring drummer Peter Baxter.

== Publications ==
- 28 sliverfish macronix out to lunch (1992)
- Frank Zappa: The Negative Dialectics of Poodle Play (1994)
- Art, Class and Cleavage: A Quantulumcunque Concerning Materialist Esthetix (1998)
- The Complete Guide to the Music of Frank Zappa (1998)
- (with Robert Deller, Esther Leslie and Ted Curtis) The Mad Pride: A Celebration of Mad Culture (2000)
- Shit-Kicks and Dough-Balls (2003)
- Derek Bailey and the Story of Free Improvisation (2004)
- Frank Zappa: The Complete Guide to his Music (2005)
- (with Esther Leslie) Academy Zappa: Proceedings of the First International Conference of Esemplastic Zappology (2005)
- Adorno for Revolutionaries (2011)
- Blake in Cambridge (2012)
