= Esther Leslie =

British political aesthetician (born 1964)

Esther Leslie FBA
- Born: 1964 (age 61–62)
- Title: Professor of political aesthetics
- Board member of: Radical Philosophy; Revolutionary History; Historical Materialism; People's Museum: Somers Town

Academic background
- Education: Free University of Berlin
- Alma mater: University of Sussex
- Influences: Walter Benjamin

Academic work
- Discipline: Cultural studies
- Institutions: University of East London; Middlesex University; London Guildhall University; London Consortium; Birkbeck
- Main interests: Politics, art and technology
- Notable works: Walter Benjamin: Overpowering Conformism
- Website: militantesthetix.co.uk

Esther Leslie FBA (b. 1964) is a Professor of Political Aesthetics at Birkbeck, University of London. She has taught at Birkbeck since January 2000. She has written on Walter Benjamin, Adorno, Kracauer and the Frankfurt School, and explored themes such as animation, chemical industries, including IG Farben and Imperial Chemical Industries, liquid crystals, fascism and culture, Weimar radio, screen and digital cultures, Marxism and Anarchism, fashion, design and craft, Romanticism, and Black radicalism in Somers Town.

== Early life ==
Leslie has identified her upbringing, within a political family from a mixed immigrant background, as forming her politics at an early age. Her parents were both avowed Trotskyists who were involved with the Revolutionary History journal, she had a grandfather who had participated in the hunger marches, another, Charles Lahr, who was a German anarchist, and a grandmother, Esther Argeband, who was an anarchist of Polish-Jewish heritage. As a teenager Leslie was drawn to the philosophy of Karl Marx and punk. In particular she liked bands such as Alternative TV, Buzzcocks, and The Nightingales for their musical repertoire, whilst being drawn to the political leanings of Crass and Poison Girls.

== Academic career ==
Leslie was formerly a Lecturer in Cultural and Media Studies at the University of East London, she taught on the contextual studies programme of the Art School at Middlesex University, and in Communication Studies at London Guildhall University. Leslie oversaw the final period of the MRes/PhD programme of the London Consortium, on which she had taught a course on Cold with Steven Connor.

Leslie was elected as a Fellow of the British Academy in 2019. She is co-director of the Birkbeck Institute for the Humanities. She is one of the developers of the Arts and Humanities Research Council-funded project Animate Assembly, which provides an expanded glossary of animation.

Leslie is a co-director and academic lead at the People's Museum: Somers Town founded by Diana Foster. She helped to curate the lead exhibition - Lost and Found: Somers Town, which opened in May 2022. She is a founding editor of the journal Historical Materialism. For several years, she was on the editorial collective of Radical Philosophy. She was an editor of Revolutionary History, a journal of Trotskyist history, inter alia.

== Personal life ==
Her partner is Ben Watson. She is the granddaughter of Charles Lahr.

== Selected publications ==
- Leslie, E. and Dolbear, S. 2023. Dissonant Waves: Ernst Schoen and Experimental Sound in the Twentieth Century. London, Goldsmiths Press.
- Leslie, E. 2023. The Rise and Fall of Imperial Chemical Industries: Synthetics, Sensism and the Environment. London, Palgrave Macmillan.
- Leslie, E. and Juarez, G. (eds.) 2018. Flux until sunrise, a booklet for Geraldine Juarez. Sweden: Rojal Förlag.
- Leslie, E. and Jackson, M. 2018 Deeper in the pyramid. London, UK: Banner Repeater.
- Lori, M., Chalmers, C., Evans, G. Mooney, S., Mudie, P., Taberham, P., Sheehan, R., Hamblyn, N., Leslie, E.and Lori, M. (eds). 2018. Stan Brakhage: the realm buster. London, UK: John Libbey.
- Leslie, E. 2016. Liquid crystals: the art and science of a fluid form. London, UK: Reaktion.
- Leslie, E.,2017. Dolbear, S., and Truskolaski, S., (eds.) 2016. Walter Benjamin: the storyteller. London, UK: Verso.
- Leslie, E. 2007. Synthetic Worlds: Nature, Art and the Chemical Industry. London, UK: Reaktion.
- Leslie, E. 2015. Derelicts: Thought Worms from the Wreckage<. London, UK: Unkant.
- Leslie, E. 2000. Hollywood Flatlands: Animation, Critical Theory and the Avant Garde. London, UK: Verso.

=== Selected media work ===
- Thought Cloud, an essay for series Head in the Clouds, broadcast on BBC Radio 3 on 26 Feb 2009.
- Walter Benjamin, an episode of In Our Time, BBC Radio 4, 10 Feb 2022.

=== External links ===
- A career-spanning interview is hosted on various sites, including the Verso blog.
