= Robert Dellar =

Mental health advocate

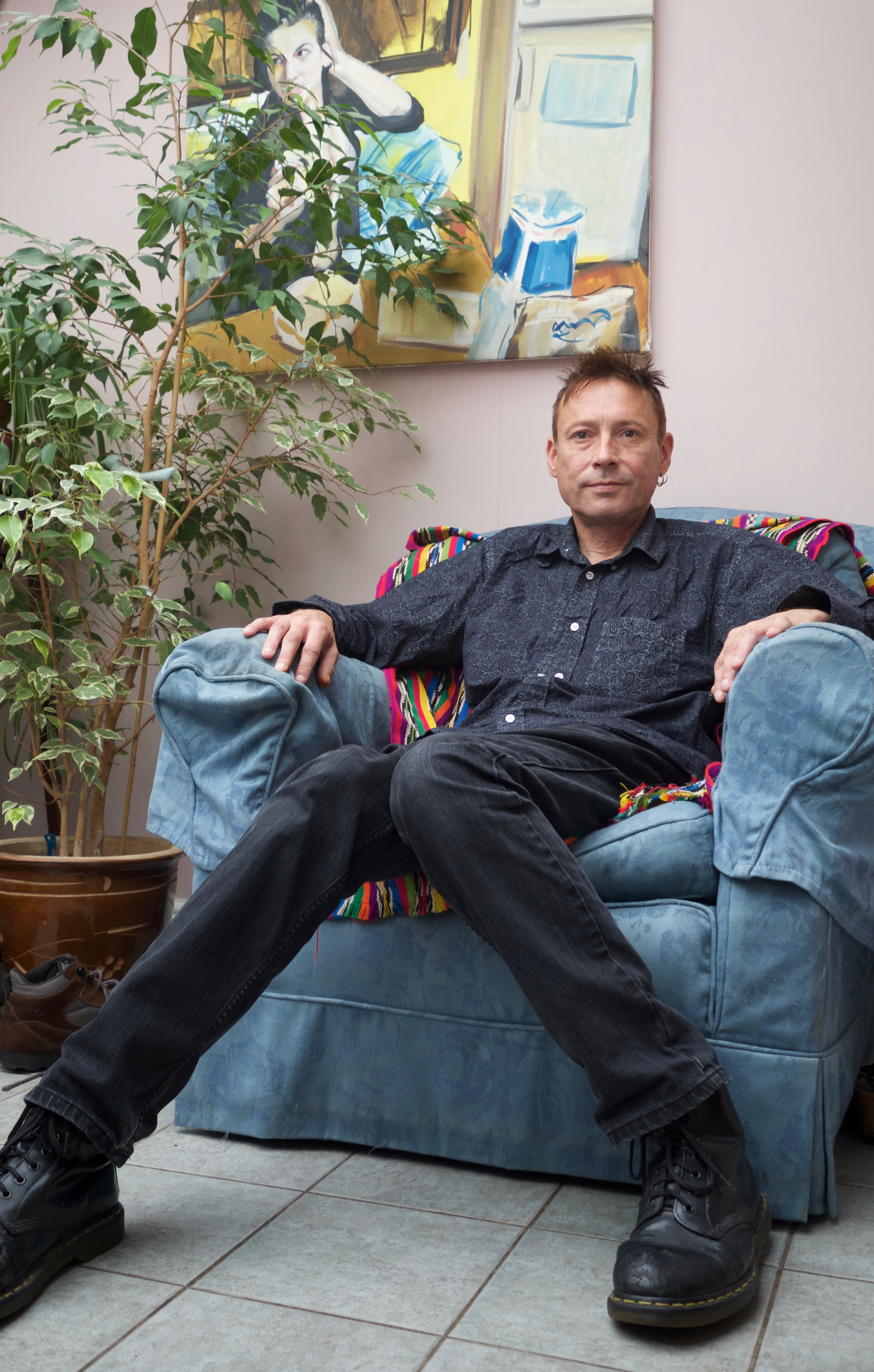
- Portrait of Dellar, 2016
- Born: 16 December 1964
- Died: 17 December 2016 (aged 52); London
- Education: WBGS; University of Sussex
- Occupation: Development worker
- Years active: 1980s-2016
- Notable work: Mad Pride (ed.)
- Partner: Shirley
- Children: 1

Robert Dellar (16 December 1964 – 17 December 2016) was a British activist, musician and poet who was one of the founders of the Mad Pride movement.

Dellar grew up in Garston, Hertfordshire, attending Watford Grammar School for Boys..

In the mid 1980s Dellar moved to Brighton to study at Sussex University, also publishing the fanzine Straight Up. He then moved to London, where he would live for the rest of his life. He founded Spare Change Books, an independent publisher, in 1995.

Dellar worked for the mental health charity Mind, initially at Hackney & City Mind in the early 1990s. He also founded Hackney Patients Council in 1994. He was appointed as a development worker at Southwark Mind in 1997.

Dellar died of a pulmonary embolism one day after his fifty-second birthday, with a post mortem revealing he also had pancreatic cancer. He wrote several books, and a biography was published posthumously.

== Publications ==
- Gobbing, Pogoing and Gratuitous Bad Language!: An Anthology of Punk Short Stories (editor) Spare Change Books (1998) ISBN 0952574454
- Seaton Point Robert Dellar and others, Spare Change Books (1998) ISBN 0952574411
- Mad Pride: A Celebration of Mad Culture (Edited by Robert Dellar with Ted Curtis and Esther Leslie), Spare Change Books (2003) ISBN 095257442X
- Splitting in Two: Mad Pride and Punk Rock Oblivion Unkant Publishers (2014) ISBN 0992650909
- Kiss Of Life: Remembering Robert Dellar (ed. Lawrence Burton) Ce Acatl Publishing (2017)
