= Mikhail Vasilyevich Popov =

Soviet-Russian philosopher and economist

- Russian: Михаил Васильевич Попов
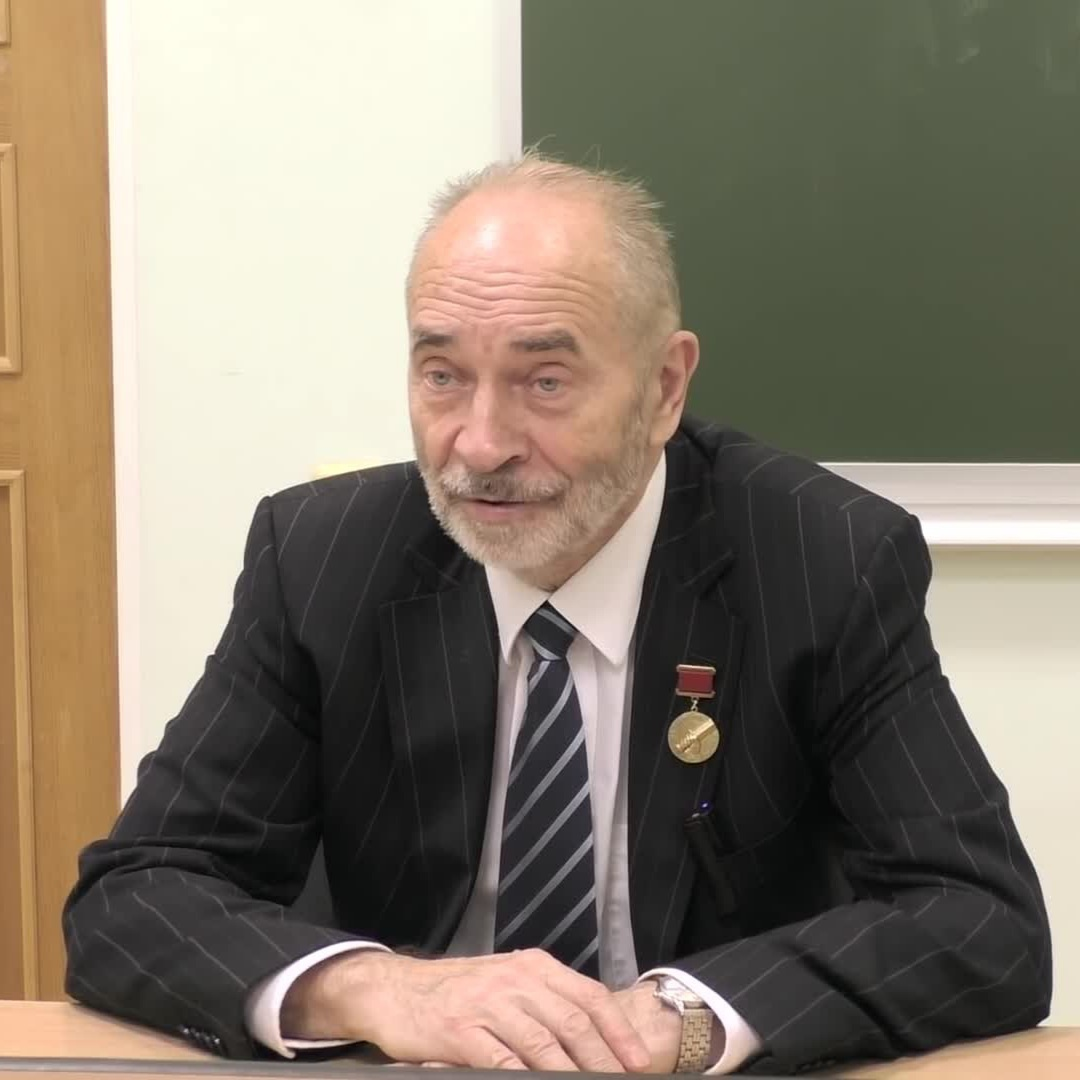
- Born: 24 February 1945 (age 81); Tambov Oblast

Academic background
- Education: Saint Petersburg State University

Academic work
- Discipline: philosophy economics
- Institutions: Saint Petersburg State University

Mikhail Vasilyevich Popov (Russian: Михаил Васильевич Попов; born 24 February 1945 in Tambov Oblast) is a Soviet Russian scientist in the fields of philosophy and economy. Doktor Nauk in Philosophical Sciences (1989), Professor at the Saint Petersburg State University, Member of the Petrovskaya Academy of Sciences and Arts. He is a popularizer of Marxism and socialism. He is the leader and ideologist of the Workers' Party of Russia.

Lived in Saint Petersburg (since 1946). He graduated with honors as a mathematician from the Faculty of Mathematics and Mechanics of Saint Petersburg State University in 1968. During his student years, he was engaged in sambo. He was a Komsomol member.

He received the Candidate's degree in 1971. In 1987, he defended his doctoral dissertation. In 1995, he received the title of Professor.

From 1971 he worked at the Saint Petersburg State University. Alexei Kudrin was his student.

Popov is the author of 9 monographs and more than 300 works.

Member of the Communist Party of the Soviet Union since 1967. He was a member of the Leningrad Regional Committee of the Communist Party of the Soviet Union. He was a candidate for People's Deputies of the USSR. In the 1991 Russian presidential election, Mikhail Popov was a trusted representative of Albert Makashov. Popov was assistant to Oleg Shein.

He is a Molodaya Gvardiya (magazine) award winner (1981).

== Views ==
In March 2022, Popov supported Russian invasion of Ukraine and published a video appealing to "the Ukrainian working class".

Since the 2000s, Mikhail Popov has supported the restoration of Russian SFSR and of the USSR, and he has also stated about the need of a Second October Revolution for make Socialism great again, and the "Great Trial Against Capitalism" in order to end capitalism. And since the start of the war on Gaza, Popov has advocated for a "NATO People's Revolt" and has appealed to the "North Atlantic Working Class" and to the "Western Working Class" for rebel and revolt against their governments and states because of the "genocide on Gaza".

Mikhail Popov has also opposed Liberal Democracy considering it a form of "Liberal Authoritarianism" and "Liberal Totalitarianism" and a way to legitimate and justify the Dictatorship of the Capital and the Dictatorship of the Market.

== Select bibliography ==
- Демократический централизм – основной принцип управления социалистической экономикой. Лениздат. 1975 – 174 стр.
- Ленинизм как современный марксизм
