= Victor Serge =

Russian revolutionary and author (1890–1947)

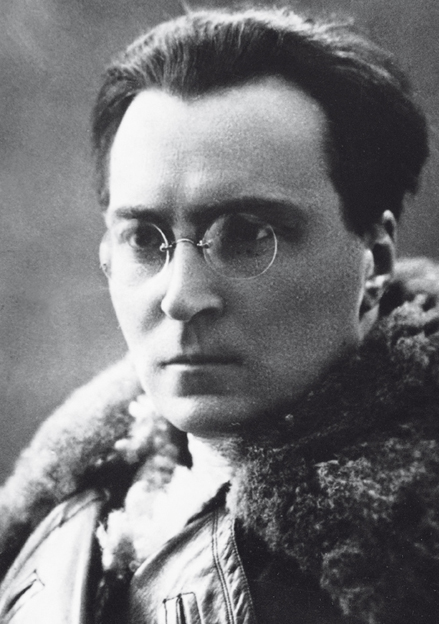
- Serge in the early 1920s
- Born: Viktor Lvovich Kibalchich; 30 December 1890; Brussels, Belgium
- Died: 17 November 1947 (aged 56); Mexico City, Mexico
- Notable work: The Case of Comrade Tulayev (1949); Memoirs of a Revolutionary, 1901–1941 (1951)
- Political party: Socialist Young Guards (1905–1909); Russian Communist Party (1919–1928)
- Spouse: Lyubov Aleksandrovna Rusakova
- Partner: Laurette Séjourné
- Children: 2, including Vlady

Victor Serge (French: [viktɔʁ sɛʁʒ]; born Viktor Lvovich Kibalchich, Russian: Ви́ктор Льво́вич Киба́льчич; 30 December 1890 – 17 November 1947) was a Belgian-born Russian revolutionary, novelist, poet, historian, journalist, and translator. Serge was a key eyewitness to and participant in the revolutionary movements of the 20th century and the opposition to Stalinism, which influenced his writing along with contemporary Modernist experiments. His notable and best-known works as an author include such novels as The Case of Comrade Tulayev, his historical account Year One of the Russian Revolution, and his Memoirs of a Revolutionary, 1901–1941.

Originally an anarchist, Victor Serge joined the Bolsheviks in January 1919 after arriving in Petrograd (Saint Petersburg) at the height of the Russian Civil War. He worked for the Comintern as a journalist, editor, and translator and was an early critic of the emerging Stalinist regime. Serge joined the Left Opposition in 1923 and was expelled from the Communist Party in late 1927 or early 1928. He was imprisoned by the Soviet regime in 1928 and again from 1933 to 1936.

Following an international campaign by prominent intellectuals, Serge was released from deportation in Orenburg and allowed to leave the Soviet Union in April 1936. During his subsequent exiles in France and Mexico, he continued to write extensively, producing critical analyses of the Soviet Union, several acclaimed novels depicting the lives of revolutionaries and the psychological toll of political struggle, and historical works.

His writings offer a unique perspective on the Russian Revolution, its degeneration into totalitarianism, and the broader struggles against fascism and authoritarianism; critics have also embraced his fiction works as remarkable examples of Modernist literature influenced by Joyce, Freud and Russian modernism. After decades of relative obscurity, interest in Serge's work experienced a significant revival towards the end of the 20th century and into the 21st, with many of his books being republished. He is remembered for his unwavering commitment to socialist ideals, his defense of individual freedom and critical thought, and his powerful literary testimonies to the "unforgettable times" he lived through.

== Early life and political beginnings ==
Viktor Lvovich Kibalchich was born on 30 December 1890, in Brussels, Belgium, to impoverished Russian émigré intellectuals. His parents were Narodnik sympathizers who had fled Russia after the assassination of Tsar Alexander II in 1881, a plot in which a relative, Nikolai Kibalchich, a chemist, played a key technical role and was subsequently executed. Victor Kibalchich did not adopt the name "Victor Serge" until 1917, when he began writing for Tierra y Libertad in Spain.

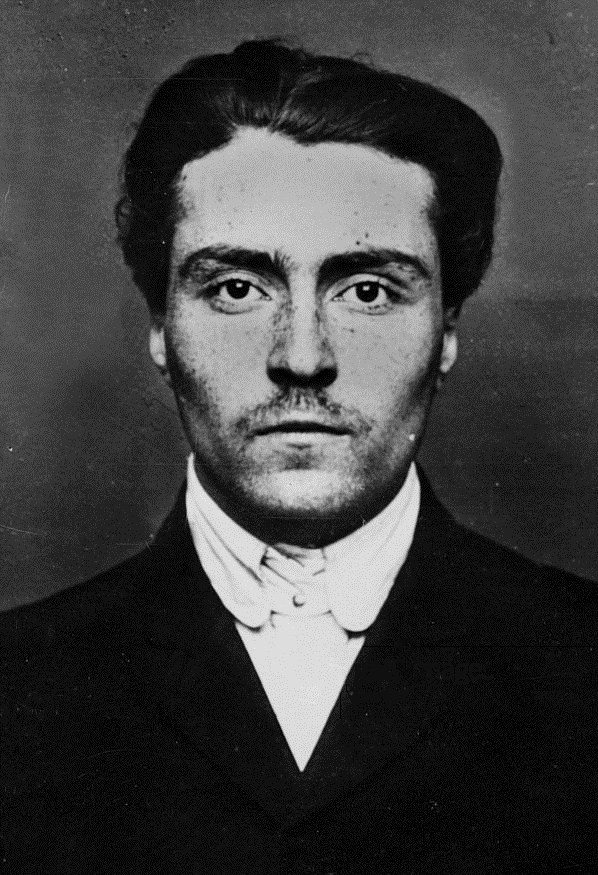
Mugshot taken by French police, 1912

In his youth, Serge joined the Belgian Young Socialists but soon became disgusted with their electoralism and opportunism. He turned to anarchism, moving to Paris in 1909. There, he associated with anarcho-individualist and illegalist circles, became a writer and editor for the journal L'Anarchie under the pen name Le Rétif (The Stubborn One), and was implicated with the Bonnot Gang. Although he did not participate in the gang's expropriations, he defended the principle of individual expropriation. Refusing to denounce his comrades, Serge was sentenced to five years of solitary confinement in 1913 for his association with the group. This experience formed the basis of his first novel, Men in Prison.

Released in January 1917, Serge was expelled from France and went to Barcelona, Spain. There, he joined the CNT, participated in the syndicalist uprising of July 1917, and wrote for Tierra y Libertad. Disillusioned with anarchism's inability to confront the question of power and drawn by the Russian Revolution, he decided to go to Russia. He attempted to reach Russia via France but was arrested in October 1917 for violating his expulsion order and interned as a "Bolshevik suspect" in a French concentration camp at Precigne for fifteen months. In the camp, he studied Marxism with other Russian revolutionaries.

== Russian Revolution and Comintern ==
=== Arrival in Russia and joining the Bolsheviks ===
Serge was exchanged for French military officers held by the Russians and arrived in Petrograd in January 1919. He was immediately struck by the harsh realities of the Civil War, famine, and the Red Terror, as well as the Bolsheviks' authoritarian measures. An article by Grigory Zinoviev on "The Monopoly of Power" shocked him, raising concerns about the suppression of democratic liberties. Nevertheless, Serge believed Bolshevism was necessary for the survival of the revolution and joined the Russian Communist Party (Bolsheviks) in May 1919.

=== Work in the Comintern and Civil War ===
Serge was quickly put to work in the newly formed Communist International (Comintern), leveraging his linguistic skills and European revolutionary experience. He worked with Zinoviev, then President of the Comintern, and Vladimir Mazin to establish the Comintern's administration. He ran the Romance-language section, edited publications, translated, and met foreign delegates. During the Civil War, Serge participated in the defense of Petrograd, served as a trooper in a Communist battalion, engaged in smuggling arms, and became a commissar in charge of the archives of the former Tsarist secret police, the Okhrana. His experiences with the Okhrana archives led to his book What Everyone Should Know about State Repression.

=== Early critiques and Kronstadt ===
While committed to the Bolshevik cause, Serge was critical of their authoritarian practices from early on. He objected to the "stultifying structures" and the rise of bureaucracy. The suppression of the Kronstadt rebellion in March 1921 was a particularly distressing event for Serge. He believed the Bolsheviks could have reached a compromise with the sailors, whose demands often mirrored earlier Bolshevik ideals, but that the Party panicked. Serge was horrified by the Party's lies surrounding the event, considering it a "watershed for the Revolution and its ideals". Despite his anguish, he ultimately sided with the Party, believing the alternative was counter-revolution.

The introduction of the New Economic Policy (NEP) in 1921 dismayed Serge, who saw it as a retreat towards capitalism. He proposed an alternative, a "communism of associations", based on worker-controlled cooperatives and democratic planning from below, but this found little traction. Disillusioned by the growing bureaucratization and the compromises of NEP, Serge and some French Communist friends attempted to establish an agricultural commune, "Novaya-Ladoga", in late 1921, but it failed due to local hostility and hardship.

== Germany, Vienna, and Left Opposition ==
In late 1921 or early 1922, Serge accepted a Comintern assignment in Berlin. He was tasked with editing the French edition of the Comintern journal International Press Correspondence (Inprekorr, or La Correspondance Internationale, LCI). He witnessed firsthand the economic and social decay of Weimar Germany, the rampant inflation, and the political polarization. He was critical of the Comintern's often misinformed and bureaucratic handling of the German revolutionary situation, particularly during the failed "German October" of 1923.

During a trip to Moscow at the end of 1922 or in June 1923 for a Comintern Executive meeting, Serge was surprised by the relative prosperity brought by NEP but alarmed by the growing corruption and social disparities. He noted the degeneration within the Comintern itself.

From late 1923 to 1925, Serge was based in Vienna, continuing his Comintern work. Vienna had become a crossroads for international revolutionaries, and Serge associated with figures like Georg Lukács, Antonio Gramsci, and Adolf Joffe. It was during this period in Vienna, in 1923, that Serge formally joined the Left Opposition, which was coalescing around Leon Trotsky in the Soviet Union to resist the bureaucratization of the Party and advocate for a policy of industrialization and workers' democracy. After Vladimir Lenin's death in 1924, Serge wrote Lenin 1917, a study that, while seemingly an official tribute, implicitly criticized the emerging Stalinist leadership by emphasizing Lenin's internationalism and reliance on mass democracy.

== Return to USSR and anti-Stalinist struggle ==
Serge returned to the Soviet Union in 1925, intending to actively participate in the Left Opposition. He found a society in moral crisis under NEP, with widespread disillusionment and the rise of a new privileged stratum. He became a leading figure in the Leningrad Opposition, working closely with Trotsky's supporters like Alexandra Bronstein. The Opposition advocated for a program of industrialization, revitalization of Soviet democracy, and a commitment to international revolution, opposing Joseph Stalin's theory of "Socialism in One Country".

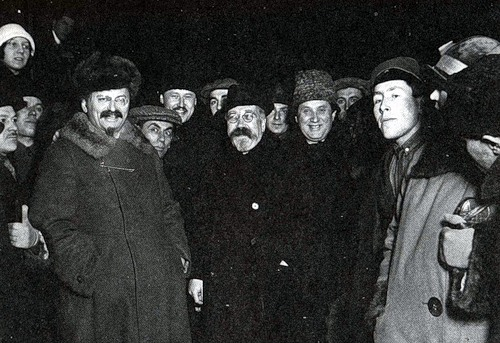
Leon Trotsky, Lev Kamenev and Grigory Zinoviev, mid-1920s

The internal Party struggle intensified, with Stalin, Zinoviev, and Lev Kamenev (the "Troika") launching a campaign against Trotsky and Trotskyism. After the Troika split in 1925, Zinoviev and Kamenev briefly formed the United Opposition with Trotsky in 1926. Serge was involved in unifying the Leningrad Trotskyist and Zinovievist groups. Despite their efforts, the Opposition was systematically silenced, their members harassed, and their platform suppressed. Serge was expelled from the Communist Party just after the Fifteenth Party Congress in December 1927, which also expelled the leading figures of the United Opposition. He was arrested in March 1928 and imprisoned for seven to eight weeks.

After his release from prison in 1928, Serge, now politically silenced within the USSR, turned to "serious writing" as a means of resistance and testimony. He had suffered a near-fatal intestinal occlusion, which, combined with his political "death", led him to dedicate the rest of his life to chronicling the "unforgettable times". In the following five years of precarious liberty, he produced a remarkable body of work, including the novels Men in Prison and Birth of Our Power, and the historical work Year One of the Russian Revolution. His works were published abroad but boycotted in the Soviet Union and often ignored or criticized by both the mainstream Western press and the official Communist left.

Serge was a firsthand witness to the brutal processes of forced collectivization and crash industrialization initiated by Stalin in 1928–29. He documented the ensuing grain crisis, the war against the peasantry (dekulakization), the mass deportations, and the devastating famine of 1932–33. His analysis, articulated in works like Soviets 1929 (published under Panaït Istrati's name) and later in Russia Twenty Years After, traced these policies to Stalin's bureaucratic response to the failures of NEP and the regime's determination to maintain power at any cost. He also chronicled the wave of show trials against "specialists" and former oppositionists, recognizing them as a means to find scapegoats for the regime's failures and consolidate Stalin's totalitarian control.

== Deportation to Orenburg ==
In March 1933, Serge was arrested again by the OGPU (Soviet secret police). After 85 days of solitary confinement and interrogation in the Lubyanka, he was condemned without trial to three years of deportation in Orenburg, a remote city in the Ural region, for "counter-revolutionary conspiracy". His apolitical sister-in-law, Anita Russakova, was falsely implicated in his case through a fabricated confession.

Life in Orenburg was marked by extreme hardship, famine, and constant surveillance. Serge, along with his son Vlady who joined him in 1934, endured near starvation. His wife Liuba's mental health deteriorated under the strain. Despite the conditions, Serge continued to write, producing four books: the novels Les Hommes perdus (about pre-war French anarchists) and La Tourmente (a sequel to Conquered City), a collection of poems titled Résistance, and work on Year Two of the Russian Revolution.

Meanwhile, an international campaign for Serge's release was launched by his friends in Paris, including Magdeleine Paz and Jacques Mesnil. The "Victor Serge Affair" gained prominence, particularly at the 1935 International Congress of Writers for the Defence of Culture in Paris, where prominent figures like André Malraux and André Gide were pressed to intervene. Romain Rolland eventually raised Serge's case directly with Stalin during a visit to Moscow in 1935.

In April 1936, Serge was unexpectedly granted permission to leave the Soviet Union. However, his manuscripts were confiscated by the NKVD upon his departure, a loss he deeply lamented.

== Exile in Europe ==
Serge arrived in Brussels, Belgium, in April 1936, then moved to Paris. He was immediately stripped of his Soviet nationality and faced continued harassment from NKVD agents and the Communist press, which libeled him as a "common criminal" and an agent of Trotsky. He threw himself into exposing the Moscow Trials, writing pamphlets like Sixteen Executed: Where is the Revolution Going? and From Lenin to Stalin, and the more extensive analysis Destiny of a Revolution (published in English as Russia Twenty Years After).

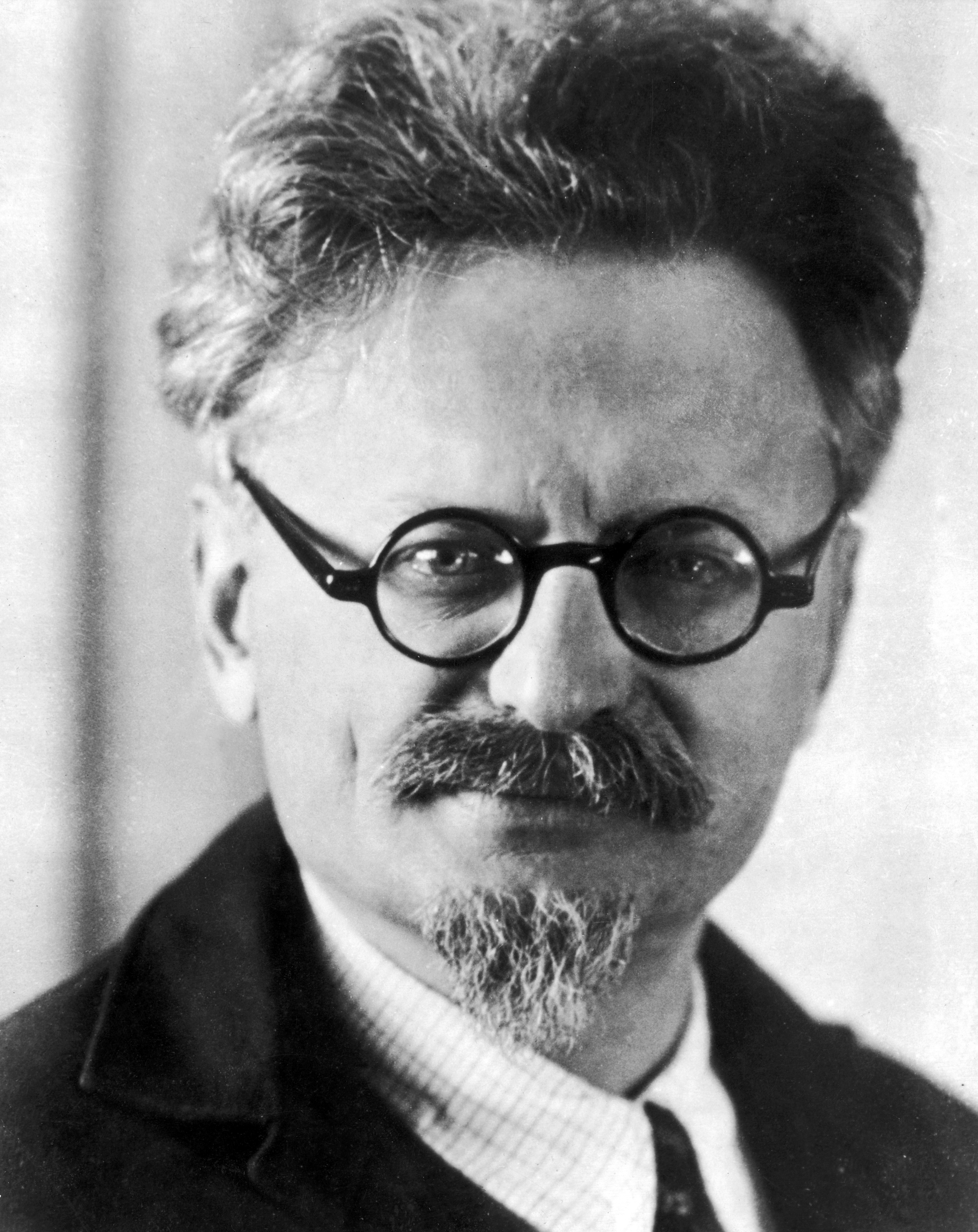
Trotsky in the 1930s

During this period (1936–1938), Serge engaged in an intense correspondence with Leon Trotsky, then in Norway and later Mexico. They collaborated on refuting the Moscow Trial charges and analyzing Soviet developments. However, significant political differences emerged, particularly over the Spanish Civil War (Serge supported the POUM, which Trotsky criticized), the Kronstadt issue (which Serge insisted on re-examining publicly), and the formation of the Fourth International (which Serge viewed as premature and sectarian). These disagreements led to a bitter polemical exchange and a rupture in their relationship by 1939, though Serge always maintained a deep respect for Trotsky's historical role and intellectual contributions.

Serge was deeply involved in assisting anti-Stalinist and anti-fascist refugees in Paris. The NKVD's assassination campaign extended into Europe, claiming victims like Ignace Reiss and Leon Sedov, Trotsky's son, whose deaths Serge investigated and publicized.

== Final exile in Mexico ==
=== Flight from Europe ===
With the fall of France in June 1940, Serge, accompanied by his son Vlady and his companion Laurette Séjourné, fled Paris. After a perilous journey, they reached Marseille, which had become a temporary refuge for thousands of anti-fascist intellectuals and political militants seeking to escape Europe. Serge worked with Varian Fry and the Emergency Rescue Committee (ERC), living for a time at the Villa Air-Bel, a haven for endangered artists and writers. Obtaining visas was an arduous process, hampered by bureaucratic obstacles and political suspicions. After six harrowing months, Serge and Vlady finally secured passage on a freighter, the Capitaine Paul Lemerle, in March 1941. Their journey involved detentions in Martinique (where they were briefly jailed) and the Dominican Republic before they finally arrived in Mexico in September 1941. Laurette Séjourné and Serge's young daughter, Jeannine (born in Orenburg in 1935), joined them in Mexico in March 1942.

=== Life and work in Mexico ===
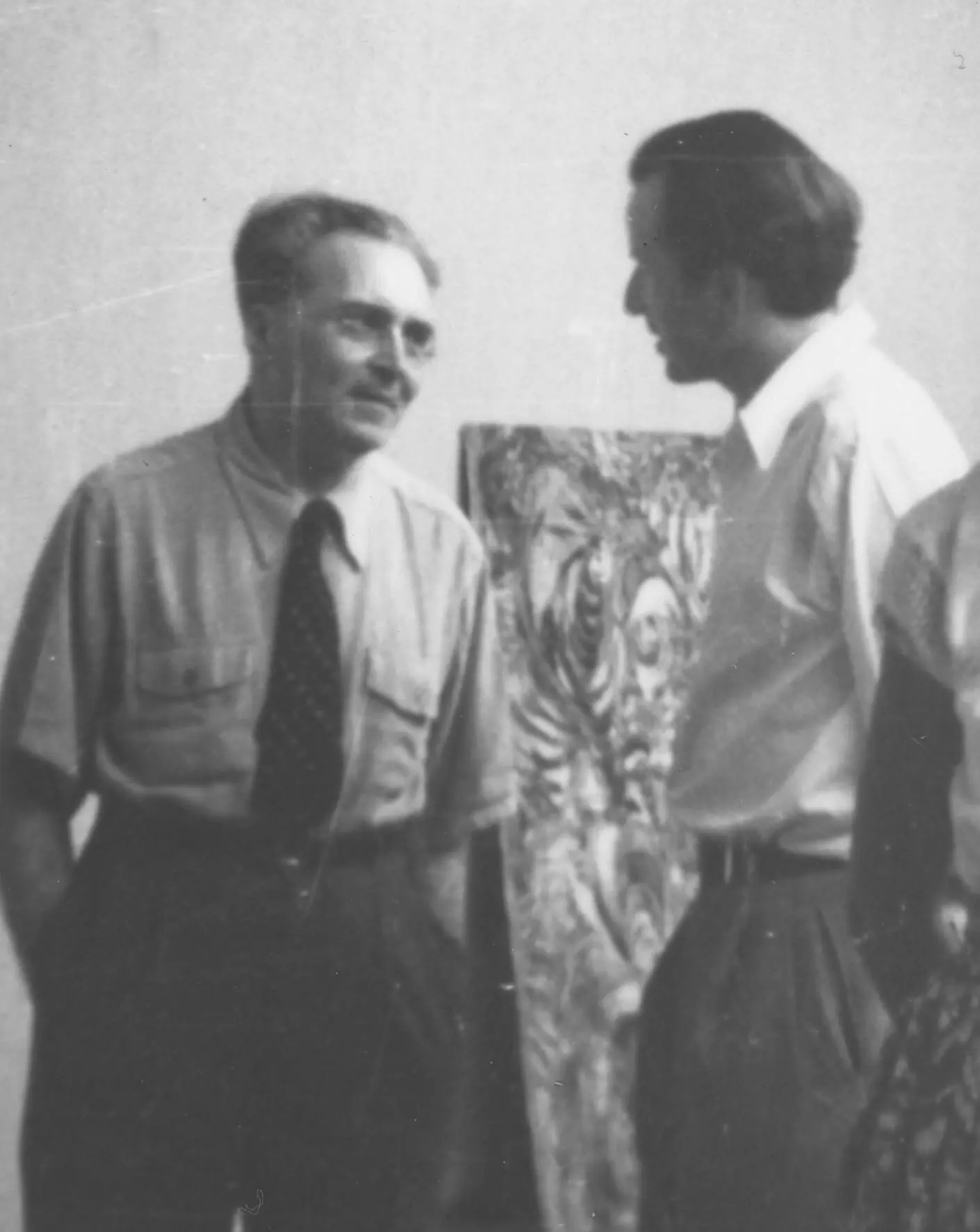
Serge (left) in Wolfgang Paalen's studio in Mexico, 1942

In Mexico City, Serge faced continued poverty, political isolation, and difficulties in publishing his work. He was slandered by the local Communist press and NKVD agents as a Nazi sympathizer and "fifth columnist". He associated with other European exiles, including members of the POUM and independent socialists, forming the discussion group "Socialismo y Libertad", which published the journals Mundo and Analysis.

Despite the hardships, Serge's final years in Mexico were a period of intense literary and political reflection. He completed some of his most important works, including his Memoirs of a Revolutionary, 1901–1941, the novels The Case of Comrade Tulayev and The Long Dusk (published in English as Last Times), and kept a voluminous journal (Carnets). He wrote extensively on the nature of World War II, the future of socialism, the Soviet system, and the rise of totalitarianism.

=== Later political thought ===
In his final writings, Serge grappled with the profound crisis of socialism in the wake of Stalinism and fascism. He analyzed the Soviet Union as a form of "bureaucratic totalitarianism with collectivist leanings", distinct from both capitalism and traditional socialism. He saw similar "collectivist tendencies" in Nazi Germany and even in aspects of the New Deal, fearing the rise of new, undemocratic social formations managed by technocratic elites.

Serge called for a fundamental renewal of socialist thought, emphasizing the "defence of man", "defence of truth", and "defence of thought" as essential preconditions for any genuine socialist project. He stressed the need for socialist movements to integrate democratic principles and individual liberties, warning against the dangers of authoritarianism, sectarianism, and dogmatism. He maintained a deep, albeit critical, adherence to Marxism, arguing for its humanistic core and its relevance for understanding and transforming the world. His concept of the "sense of history"—a conscious participation in the collective human endeavor for a better future—remained a central theme.

== Death ==
Victor Serge died of a heart attack in Mexico City on 17 November 1947. He was impoverished, his clothes threadbare. Some of his associates, including his son Vlady, suspected he might have been poisoned by MGB agents, as the circumstances of his death while hailing a taxi were somewhat unclear, though no definitive proof has emerged. In 1995, the US government released a decrypted Soviet secret message traffic "Venona" which confirmed that there indeed was a cell of MGB agents among Mexico City cab drivers who specialized in liquidations of undesirables. He was buried in the Spanish section of the Panteón Francés cemetery in Mexico City.

== Literary works ==
Victor Serge's literary output was prodigious, encompassing novels, historical works, political essays, poetry, and memoirs. He turned to "serious writing" as a novelist in 1928 after his first Soviet imprisonment, viewing literature as a means of testimony and a way to explore the human dimensions of revolutionary struggle and defeat. According to William Giraldi, Serge's novels may be "read like an alloy of" George Orwell and Franz Kafka: "the uncommon political acuity of Orwell and the absurdist comedy of Kafka, a comedy with the damning squint of satire, except the satire is real." In his studies of Serge, Richard Greeman described him as a Modernist writer influenced by James Joyce, Andrei Bely and Freud; Greeman also believed that Serge, although writing in French, continued the experiments of such Russian Soviet writers as Isaac Babel, Osip Mandelstam, and Boris Pilnyak, and poets Vladimir Mayakovsky and Sergei Yesenin.

Ben Lerner in a review of the "unsettling explorations of the tension between individual and collective life" that are Serge's novels describes his materialism as having "a spiritual element [where] physics and metaphysics, frequencies and faith, interpenetrate". Furthermore, that "everything that glows is precious to Victor Serge, is a source of wonder, a glimmer of possibility beyond the catastrophe of the present".

His novels, such as Men in Prison (1930), Birth of Our Power (1931), Conquered City (1932), Midnight in the Century (1939), The Case of Comrade Tulayev (1948), and Unforgiving Years (published posthumously), are deeply informed by his personal experiences as an anarchist, Bolshevik, oppositionist, prisoner, and exile. They often depict the moral dilemmas, psychological pressures, and human tragedies faced by individuals caught in the maelstrom of historical events. Weissman notes Serge's style often involved portraying great historical events where the actions of the masses, rather than single characters, drove the plot. Nicholas Lezard calls The Case of Comrade Tulayev "one of the great 20th-century Russian novels" that follows the traditions of "Gogolian absurdity".

His historical and political works, including Year One of the Russian Revolution (1930), From Lenin to Stalin (1937), and Russia Twenty Years After (1937, originally Destiny of a Revolution), offer partisan yet scholarly analyses of the Russian Revolution and its subsequent degeneration. His Memoirs of a Revolutionary (1951) is considered a classic of 20th-century political autobiography.

== Legacy ==
Victor Serge's life and work were largely marginalized during the Cold War, caught between the anathemas of Stalinism and Western anti-communism. However, beginning in the late 20th century, there has been a significant revival of interest in his writings. Many of his books have been republished and translated into multiple languages, and his work is increasingly recognized for its literary merit and its profound insights into the political and moral crises of the 20th century.

He is valued as an incorruptible witness to the revolutionary upheavals and totalitarian tragedies of his time. His consistent defense of human freedom, his critique of all forms of oppression, and his efforts to forge a democratic, libertarian socialism continue to resonate with contemporary readers and activists. As Susan Weissman notes, Serge "belongs to our future" due to his unwavering commitment to a society that "defends human freedom, enhances human dignity and improves the human condition". Despite the defeats he witnessed, a persistent theme in Serge's work was that "the course is set on hope".

== Works available in English ==
=== Fiction ===
- The Long Dusk (1946) Translator: Ralph Manheim; New York : The Dial Press. Translation of Les derniers temps, Montreal 1946.
- The Case of Comrade Tulayev (1967) Translator: Willard R. Trask; New York : New York Review of Books Classics. Translation of L'Affaire Toulaev. Paris 1949.
- Birth of our Power (1967) Translator: Richard Greeman; New York : Doubleday. Translation of Naissance de notre force, Paris 1931.
- Men in Prison (1969) Translator: Richard Greeman; Garden City, NY: Doubleday. Translation of Les hommes dans le prison, Paris 1930.
- Serge, Victor (2011) [1932]. Conquered City [Ville conquise] (in French). Translated by Greeman, Richard. New York City: NYRB Classics. ISBN 978-1-59017-366-4.
- Serge, Victor (2014) [1939]. Midnight in the Century [S'il est minuit dans le siècle] (in French). Translated by Greeman, Richard. New York City: NYRB Classics. ISBN 9781590177709.
- Serge, Victor (2008) [1971]. Unforgiving Years [Les Années sans pardon] (in French). Translated by Greeman, Richard. New York City: NYRB Classics. ISBN 978-1-59017-247-6.
- Serge, Victor (2022). Greeman, Richard (ed.). Last Times. Translated by Manheim, Ralph. New York City: NYRB Classics. ISBN 9781681375144. (revised edition of The Long Dusk)

=== Poems ===
- Resistance (1989) Translator: James Brooks; San Francisco: City Lights. Translation of Résistance, Paris 1938.
- A Blaze in the Desert: Selected Poems by Victor Serge, translated by James Brook PM Press, Oakland, California, 2017.

=== Non-fiction: books ===
- From Lenin to Stalin (1937) Translator: Ralph Manheim; New York: Pioneer Publishers. Translation of De Lénine à Staline, Paris 1937.
- Russia Twenty Years After (1937) Translator: Max Shachtman; New York: Pioneer Publishers. Translation of Destin d'une révolution, Paris 1937. Also published as Destiny of a Revolution.
- Memoirs of a Revolutionary, 1901–1941 (2012) Translator: Peter Sedgwick with George Paizis; New York: New York Review of Books Classics. Translation of Mémoires d'un révolutionnaire, 1901–1941, Paris 1951.
- Year One of the Russian Revolution (1972) Translator: Peter Sedgwick; London: Allen Lane. Translation of L'An 1 de la révolution russe, Paris 1930.
- The Life and Death of Leon Trotsky (1973) (with Natalia Sedova Trotsky) Translator: Arnold J. Pomerans; Garden City, NY: Doubleday. Translation of: Vie et mort de Leon Trotsky, Paris 1951.
- What Everyone Should Know About State Repression (1979) Translator: Judith White; London: New Park Publications. Translation of Les Coulisses d'une Sûreté générale. Ce que tout révolutionnaire devrait savoir sur la répression, Paris 1926.
- Serge, Victor (2008). Albertani, Claudio; Rioux, Claude (eds.). Notebooks 1936-1947. Translated by Abidor, Mitchell; Greeman, Richard. New York City: NYRB Classics. ISBN 9781681372709.

=== Non-fiction: collections of essays and articles ===
- The Century of the Unexpected – Essays on Revolution and Counter-Revolution (1994) Editor: Al Richardson; special issue of Revolutionary History, Vol.5 No.3.
- The Serge-Trotsky Papers (1994) Editor: D.J. Cotterill; London: Pluto.
- Revolution in Danger – Writings from Russia 1919–1921 (1997) Translator: Ian Birchall; London: Redwords.
- The Ideas of Victor Serge: A Life as a Work of Art (1997), Edited by Susan Weissman, London: Merlin Press.
- Witness to the German Revolution (2000) Translator: Ian Birchall; London: Redwords.
- Collected Writings on Literature and Revolution (2004) Translator and editor: Al Richardson; London: Francis Boutle.

=== Non-fiction: pamphlet ===
- Kronstadt '21 (1975) Translator: not named; London: Solidarity.

Sources: British Library Catalogue and Catalog of the Library of Congress.

== See also ==
- Anarchism in France
- Anti-Stalinist left
- Transatlantic (portrayal in 2023 TV series)

== Sources ==
- Weissman, Susan (2001). Victor Serge: The Course is Set on Hope. London: Verso Books. ISBN 1-85984-987-3.
- Adam Hochschild Finding the Trapdoor: Essays, Portraits, Travels (Syracuse University Press, 1997), "Two Russians," pp. 65–87.
