= Memoirs of a Revolutionary, 1901–1941 =

1951 memoir by Victor Serge

- 1967 edition
- Author: Victor Serge
- Subject: Memoir
- Publication date: 1951

Memoirs of a Revolutionary, 1901–1941 is a 1951 memoir by Victor Serge. Posted posthumously in French as Mémoires d'un révolutionnaire, Peter Sedgwick translated an abridged version into English in 1963 with Oxford University Press. A longer version of the translation, with index, glossary and foreword by Adam Hochschild was issued by NYRB Classics in 2012.
