= Memoirs of a Revolutionist (Figner) =

Autobiography by Vera Figner

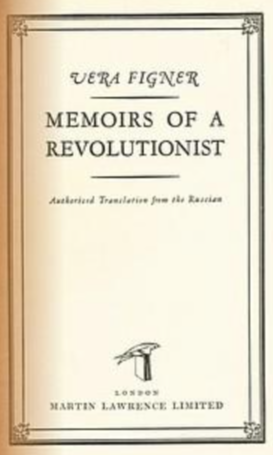
- Title page for Memoirs of a Revolutionist (1929 edition)
- Author: Vera Figner
- Publisher: International Publishers
- English publication date: 1927

Memoirs of a Revolutionist is the memoir of Vera Figner, a member of the Narodnaya Volya who helped plan the assassination of Alexander II in 1881. The Russian version was published in 1921. It was first translated into English in an abridged 1927 edition by International Publishers.

== Bibliography ==
- "Check List of New Books". The American Mercury. June 1927. p. 28.
- Cournos, John (1927). "Russia—Obverse and Reverse". The Forum. Vol. 78, no. 1. pp. 318–319.
- Frierson, Cathy A. (1991). "Review of Memoirs of a Revolutionist". Russian History. 18 (3): 369–370. ISSN 0094-288X. JSTOR 24656568.
- Littell, Robert (June 8, 1927). "Memoirs of a Revolutionist (1927)". The New Republic. p. 78.
- Pearson, Edmund (July 13, 1927). "The Book Table". The Outlook. pp. 352–353.
- Radziwill, Catherine (October 26, 1927). "Memoirs of a Revolutionist (1927)". Commonweal. p. 616.
- "Rev. of Memoirs of a Revolutionist". The New York Times. June 19, 1927. ISSN 0362-4331.
- Wolfson, Theresa (August 31, 1927). "Memoirs of a Revolutionist (1927)". The Nation. p. 208.
