= Podemos =

Podemos (We can in Spanish and Portuguese) may refer to:

- Podemos (Bolivia), Bolivian political party
- Podemos (Spanish political party), Spanish political party
- Podemos (Guatemala), Guatemalan political party
- Podemos (Venezuela), Venezuelan political party
- Juntos Podemos Más, Chilean political coalition
- Podemos (Brazil), Brazilian political party
- Optimist Party for the Development of Mozambique, known as PODEMOS
