= Russell Jackson Drake =

American civil rights attorney (born 1945)

- Jack Drake
- Born: 1945 (age 80–81); Birmingham, Alabama
- Occupations: Attorney, civil rights lawyer
- Known for: Wyatt v. Stickney

Russell Jackson "Jack" Drake (born 1945) is an American civil rights attorney, known for his role as plaintiffs' counsel in the landmark institutional reform litigation Wyatt v. Stickney.

== Early career and civil rights advocacy ==
Russell Jackson "Jack" Drake was born in Gardendale, Alabama. He graduated from the University of Alabama School of Law in 1969. Early in his legal career, he served as staff counsel for the Selma (Alabama) Interreligious Project, a civil rights organization focused on expanding economic opportunity for African Americans in Alabama's Black Belt. Working alongside regional cooperative efforts, including the Freedom Quilting Bee, he helped establish regional childcare centers and agricultural initiatives.

On October 23, 1970, Drake and co-counsel George Dean filed a landmark class-action lawsuit against the Alabama Department of Mental Health in the U.S. District Court for the Middle District of Alabama. Filed on behalf of 15-year-old principal plaintiff Ricky Wyatt in response to budget-driven layoffs at Bryce Hospital, the case challenged the constitutionality of providing mere custodial care without psychiatric treatment. The resulting rulings by judge Frank M. Johnson Jr. established minimum constitutional standards of care and treatment for patients in mental health facilities and institutions for individuals with developmental disabilities, creating a blueprint adopted nationwide, known as the "Wyatt Standards".

== Publications ==
Drake has authored several legal articles and book contributions examining judicial implementation and civil rights legal history.

- (1972) "Enforcing the Right to Treatment." American Criminal Law Review.
- (1981) "Judicial Implementation and Wyatt v. Stickney." Alabama Law Review.
- (2011) "Drafting The Case: The Parallel Legacies of Wyatt v. Stickney and Lynch v. Baxley." Law & Psychology Review.
- (2016) Voices of Civil Rights Lawyers; Reflections from the Deep South, 1964–1980 University Press of Florida.

== Personal life ==
Drake lives in Birmingham, Alabama. His career and civil rights advocacy are chronicled in his autobiography, Be Not Afraid: A Southern Journey Through Law, Liberty, and Civil Rights published by the University of Alabama Press.
