= Frank Calloway =

American artist

Frank Calloway (July 2, 1915 – September 1, 2014) was an American self-taught artist. Diagnosed with schizophrenia in 1952, he was committed to Bryce Hospital and the Alabama Department of Mental Health in Tuscaloosa. He lived in the Alice M. Kidd Nursing Facility in Tuscaloosa. His imagery was primarily agrarian, depicting the Old American South as he remembered it. He drew on butcher paper using crayons, pen and markers. The scrolls were either 24 or 36 inches high and Calloway made them anywhere from 8 to over 60 feet in length. While he claimed to be 112 years of age in 2008, research by gerontology experts deduced that he was actually born in 1915.

== Work ==
While Calloway had always done some drawing, his prolific output as an artist dates from the time he took an art class in the 1980s. Some of his drawings, most of which portray the rural Southern United States of his youth, were part of an autumn 2008 exhibit at the American Visionary Art Museum in Baltimore, Maryland.
