= Mount Vernon Arsenal-Searcy Hospital Complex =

The Mount Vernon Arsenal-Searcy Hospital Complex may refer to either of two entities that have occupied the same site:

- Mount Vernon Arsenal
- Searcy Hospital
