= Morton Birnbaum =

American lawyer and physician

- Born: October 26, 1926; Brooklyn, New York
- Died: November 26, 2005 (aged 79); Brooklyn, New York
- Education: Columbia Law School; New York Medical College, M.D. Columbia University JD, Doctorate, Legal Jurisprudence
- Known for: Advocating for the right of psychiatric patients to have adequate, humane care sanism right to treatment doctrine

Morton Birnbaum (October 20, 1926 – November 26, 2005) was an American lawyer and physician who advocated for the right of psychiatric patients to have adequate, humane care, and who coined the term sanism.

His seminal paper on "The Right To Treatment" appeared in 1960 in the American Bar Association Journal, marking the first published use of the term sanism to describe a form of discrimination against the mentally ill. His "right to treatment" concept primarily addressed the legal right of 'mentally ill' patients who were involuntarily confined to receive appropriate care. He went as far as suggesting that if suitable treatment was not provided then the person should be entitled to be released, even if this presented a risk to themselves and others. It was his belief that this practice was the only way to ensure public opinion would demand suitable treatment be made available. Over a period of two years, fifty publications refused the paper. It was not published by a psychiatric journal until 1965. At the time, public mental hospitals were warehousing large numbers of patients, often without significant treatment efforts or qualified treatment staff.

== Early life and education ==
Birnbaum was born to Jewish parents on October 20, 1926 in Brooklyn, NY. He attended Erasmus Hall High School and then Columbia University. After serving in the US Navy, Birnbaum received his Juris Doctor degree from Columbia Law School in 1951. He earned his medical degree from New York Medical College in 1957. He then undertook a postdoctoral fellowship at Harvard University in 1958, which included a training program funded by a grant from the National Institute of Mental Health. He earned his final degree, a Juris Doctor (JD) (a legal doctoral degree) from Columbia University in 1961.

Throughout his life, Birnbaum would work as an internist in a private gerontology practice in Bedford-Stuyvesant and conduct legal work pro bono. It was through his pro bono work that he first advocated for better treatment for the mentally ill, winning several legal victories for their civil rights, and for improved Medicaid benefits in state hospitals.

== Important concepts and cases ==
=== Birnbaum's "right to treatment" concept ===
Birnbaum's "right to treatment" doctrine asserted that mentally ill patients confined against their will had a fundamental legal right to proper treatment. After publishing an article describing the legal concept of "right to treatment" in 1960 and getting it published in the New York Times, Birnbaum was contacted by two separate psychiatric patients confined for mental health issues, Edward Stephens and Kenneth Donaldson, and acquired their cases. He would spend the next decade fighting similar cases, often using his own funding to finance his expenses. Though Birnbaum found success arguing for Donaldson, he was unsuccessful arguing the case of Edward Stephens, a man with schizophrenia who was detained in prison for more than 30 years without treatment, though Stephens was later released. Other lawyers disagreed with his concept because it still allowed that a patient could be indefinitely detained as long as some potentially superficial criteria were met (staffing levels, some claimed treatment), and instead argued for a better review process.

=== O'Connor v. Donaldson, 1961-75, lengthy landmark case ===
Ken Donaldson was confined fourteen years at a Florida State Mental Hospital in Chattahoochee from 1957-71 without his consent by his parents for "incompetency". Birnbaum first took on the case in the late 60's, though he had many earlier contacts with Donaldson beginning around 1960, encouraging him unsuccessfully to petition the courts for his release. In 1967 Birnbaum petitioned the 5th Circuit Court of Appeals on behalf of Donaldson, but when he was turned down, he decided to file the case with the Supreme Court. In all, Donaldson wrote 19 appeals for a court hearing.

In helping to bring the Florida-based Donaldson case to the U. S. Supreme Court in the landmark case O'Connor v. Donaldson, Birnbaum was instrumental in not only "confirming the right to treatment" for many mental patients, but also in "proposing a way to achieve better therapy for those now in inadequate public mental hospitals". After Donaldson was released in 1971 at the age of 63, the Supreme Court ruled in favor of Donaldson unanimously on June 26, 1975, and trumpeted the words of Judge Potter Stewart that "mentally ill patients cannot be confined in institutions against their will and without treatment if they are dangerous to no one and are capable of surviving on the outside".

Donaldson upon release was awarded £20,000. Over a period of 14 years inside, doctors had spoken to him for a total of less than 5 hours. Donaldson later worked for a year as a night auditor for a hotel, and began writing a book on conditions in mental institutions, entitled Insanity Inside Out.

To the disappointment of Birnbaum, the court ruled so narrowly and stated their opinion so ambiguously in Donaldson that it was doubtful whether many other mentally ill patients would be released from confinement through the use of State or other regional courts. Birnbaum was quoted as saying "The Donaldson case did nothing to guarantee the right of treatment to all the other patients who are still institutionalized,...as the Chief Justice was unable to determine what 'adequate treatment should be". The Supreme Court decision never directly addressed Birnbaum's concept of "Right to Treatment", but instead wrote that "a person could not be held against their will unless they were deemed dangerous to themselves or others". Birnbaum lamented the obstacles of obtaining treatment, noting that in Florida there was only one Doctor for one thousand patients.

He would later recall with amazement that for 14 years, in every Florida and federal court with jurisdiction and before more than 30 state, federal, and Supreme Court judges, he was unable to obtain a fundamental writ of habeas corpus for Mr. Donaldson. Securing the writ would have required the State, as custodian, to release Donaldson from confinement, at least temporarily, and bring him to court to determine the cause of his confinement.

=== Rouse v. Cameron, 1966 ===
A partial legal victory involving the right to treatment argument was the case of Rouse v. Cameron (1966), when U.S. Appeals Court District Judge David L. Bazelon became the first appellate judge, writing for the court, to state that civilly committed mental patients had a "right to treatment." Birnbaum's client had been found not guilty by reason of insanity on a deadly weapons charge and hospitalized indefinitely. Birnbaum argued that his client would have to be released if he did not receive proper care.

==== Observations on the treatment of psychopathic offenders, 1966 ====
Around 1966, Birnbaum argued that offenders diagnosed as psychopaths should more often be sent to mental hospitals than prisons. He suggested that the unrelenting debate among many psychiatrists and lawyers about whether to use a McNaughten rule, Durham rule or Model Penal Code test for an insanity defense, would make no real difference to the outcome of the case and was a distraction from the real issues presented by the case. In 1966, he noted three essential factors affecting the law and confinement of psychopathic offenders; a need for a practical dividing line between the areas of mental health and correction; a lack of adequate psychiatric knowledge concerning the many aspects of the psychopathic personality, and a dire lack of personnel and facilities required to provide even minimal care for the nearly 500,000 patients in public mental health facilities at the time.

=== Wyatt v. Stickney, 1970 ===
Beginning in 1970, Birnbaum was involved in the Alabama class-action lawsuit of Wyatt v. Stickney. U.S. District Court judge Frank Minis Johnson held that withholding adequate care and treatment from involuntarily committed patients was a violation of the equal protection clause of the Fourteenth Amendment to the United States Constitution. Subsequent hearings defining this right continued for decades, making Wyatt v. Stickney the longest mental health case in US history. Resolution of the case resulted in the "Wyatt Standards" which called for a humane psychological and physical environment, adequate staffing, and individualized treatment plans for involuntarily committed mental health patients. However, as Birnbaum pointed out, there was little in the way of effective enforcement, as was true in other cases he successfully brought to a verdict.

In the mid-1970s case of Woe v. Weinberger, Birnbaum contended that "the states were segregating the mentally ill in such a fashion that the poorer and sicker patients went to inferior state hospitals while the wealthier and less ill went to better private hospitals." Birnbaum also contended that the commitment laws of New York were unconstitutional because "they do not require that involuntary patients be given the active psychiatric care that was...the initial reason for their commitment."

=== Sanism ===
Birnbaum is credited with coining the term sanism (from sane), a form of discrimination, which he felt was in all areas of life and which obstructed justice in the courtroom. He described it as:

... the irrational thinking, feeling and behavior patterns of response by an individual or by a society to the irrational behavior (and too often even the rational behavior) of a mentally ill individual. It is morally reprehensible because it is an unnecessary and disabling burden that is added by our prejudiced society to the very real affliction of severe mental illness … It should be clearly understood that sanists are bigots …

According to Birnbaum's daughter, Rebecca Birnbaum MD, he was influenced in the concept by his close friend the lawyer and civil rights activist Florynce Kennedy, with whom he graduated from Columbia Law School. Kenneth Donaldson used the term sanism in his memoir "Insanity Inside Out," in 1976, as well as acknowledging the 'dedicated fighter', Birnbaum. Later Michael L. Perlin, now professor at New York Law School, read about it in 1980 and would use and publish on it widely.

=== The negative effects of deinstitutionalization ===
During his cases, Birnbaum sometimes disagreed with fellow advocates who were primarily concerned with civil liberties to the exclusion of welfare rights, such as lawyers from the American Civil Liberties Union. The civil liberties advocates would emphasize a stricter due process on involuntary commitment and more rights to refuse forced treatment, sometimes resulting in a rejection of both treatment and confinement. Birnbaum was horrified to observe that deinstitutionalization or the process of replacing long-stay psychiatric hospitals with community mental health services often led to many mentally ill being placed in prison or put out on the streets rather than being properly cared for. He felt that a clearer standard for a therapeutic quality of care was needed, whether it be in the community or the hospital.

Ultimately Birnbaum's legalistic approach failed to achieve a constitutional right to treatment, described as 'a disappointing failure'. Most 'right to treatment' cases were dealt with by 'consent decrees' which tended to descend into superficial bureaucratic disputes.

In November 2005, Birnbaum died of a stroke in Brooklyn at the age of 79, survived by his wife Judith and children: Julius, Jacob, Belinda, Rebeca, and David.

== See also ==
- Bazelon Center for Mental Health Law

== Sources ==
- American Bar Association Journal, May 1960 (Vol 46) Pgs 499-504: The Right To Treatment by Morton Birmbaum
- My Father's Advocacy for a Right to Treatment Rebecca Birnbaum, MD, J Am Acad Psychiatry Law 38:1:115-123 (March 2010)
- Disability Discrimination Law, Evidence and Testimony: A Comprehensive Reference Manual for Lawyers, Judges and Disability Professionals John Parry, American Bar Association, 2008. Page 7-13
- Morton Birnbaum, 79, Champion of Mentally Ill, Dies Potts, M., NY Times, October 2005
- The Right to Psychiatric Treatment: A Social-Legal Approach to the Plight of the State Hospital Patient Jonas Robitscher, Vol 18 Vill. L. Rev. Issue 1 (1972).
