= Deaf mental health care =

Deaf mental health care is the providing of counseling, therapy, and other psychiatric services to people who are deaf and hard of hearing in ways that are culturally aware and linguistically accessible. This term also covers research, training, and services in ways that improve mental health for deaf people. These services consider those with a variety of hearing levels and experiences with deafness focusing on their psychological well-being. The National Association of the Deaf has identified that specialized services and knowledge of the Deaf increases successful mental health services to this population. States such as North Carolina, South Carolina, and Alabama have specialized Deaf mental health services. The Alabama Department of Mental Health has established an office of Deaf services to serve the more than 39,000 deaf and hard of hearing person who will require mental health services.

There are multiple models of deafness; Deaf mental health focuses on a cultural model in that people who are deaf view themselves as part of a socio-cultural linguistic community, rather than people with a medical deficit or disability. Accordingly, providing deaf mental-health care to people of the Deaf community requires services from clinicians, doctors, and interpreters who are trained with this perspective and the inclusion of deaf professionals in this system of health care.

== Deaf children language development ==
Early access to language in deaf children is important for normal development of language. The critical period of language development is an important part of the linguistic development of all children - and delaying access to language input can lead to mental health concerns. Deprivation of language can negatively affect mental health and in severe cases can cause language deprivation syndrome. Child psychiatrist Sanjay Gulati is a strong proponent for the importance of language access in deaf children so that they can establish a fundamental first language. Access to auditory and visual language is important, and availability differs based on each child's abilities. Approximately 40% of deaf children also have additional disabilities.

Many states have deaf schools and institutions that provide appropriate language models along with mental health services for their students and those in the surrounding Deaf communities. The Lexington School for the Deaf in Queens, New York, provides a variety of educational and social services for the deaf. The Texas School for the Deaf in Austin, Texas, also provides a focus on mental health for students.

Deaf children in mainstream schools may be more neglected in the classroom than their hearing peers. It is also more common for deaf children to have a harder time making friends. Bullying can occur frequently among children who are deaf or hard of hearing, which can lead to negative mental health outcomes.

== Education and access ==
For a deaf person, obtaining access to proper medical treatment is challenging and they face a variety of obstacles in communication and access. This can include the way in which medical professionals initiate patient's various health exams without prior modification suitable for deaf individuals. Communication challenges and lack of doctor awareness of the culture and language of the deaf can lead deaf patients to avoid making medical appointments. An increase in the number of professionals who are trained in American Sign Language and have experience with Deaf culture increase positive mental health outcomes for deaf people.

== Aging and deafness ==
Age-related hearing loss gradually occurs in many people as they get older, typically affecting those over the age of 65. This type of hearing loss can lead to feelings of embarrassment and isolation due to the fact that those affected may no longer be able to hear family, friends, or simple everyday sounds. Those with hearing loss are less likely to want to engage in social activities due to frustration over not being able to hear. A study conducted by the National Council on Aging showed that a large portion of elders with hearing loss who were studied reported symptoms of lasting depression. Higher rates of exclusion from social and employment opportunities due to higher rates of miscommunication, making deaf adults more susceptible to mental illnesses.

Studies have found that when a person becomes deaf at an older age, it has a less extreme impact on their mental health than it does when hearing loss begins at an earlier age. However, those who were either born deaf or lost their hearing at a younger age and then age as a deaf person face some particularly difficult challenges. When a non-deaf person ages, isolationist tendencies are generally increased. This increase is even more drastic for deaf people. Furthermore, many technological advancements that are heavily dependent on auditory communication also present challenges to deaf people.

== Knowledge of professionals ==
The type and onset of deafness may cause different types of language disfluencies, diagnoses, and treatments of clients who are deaf. Cultural knowledge, language skills (e.g., fluency in American Sign Language or access to trained interpreters), and other social-cultural factors are part of the deaf mental health access model. Lack of knowledge about Deaf culture and sign language among mental health professionals can make it difficult for deaf people to access appropriate services.

== American Sign Language interpreting and training for mental health ==
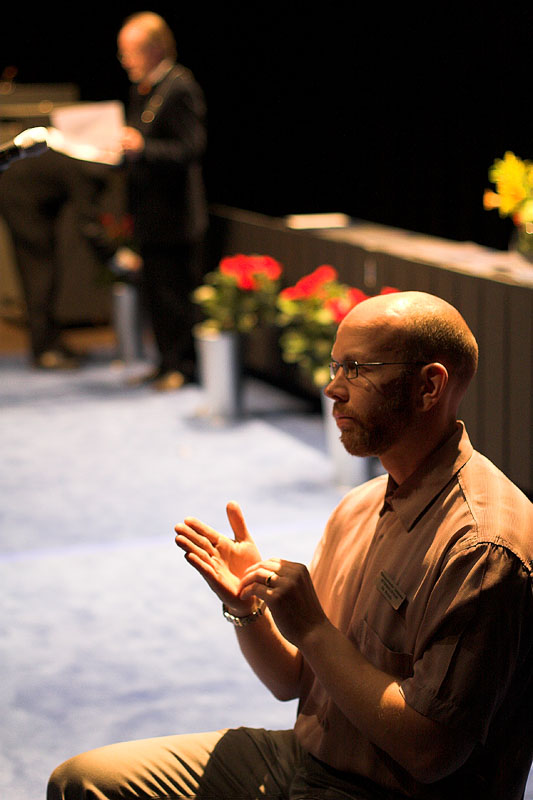
Sign language interpreter

The National Association of the Deaf has eight recommendations for qualifications of interpreters working in mental health settings:

1. Fluency in American Sign Language
2. Fluency in English and register choices
3. Culturally competent
4. Attending a comprehensive training curriculum for mental health interpreting
5. Mentoring with experienced mental health interpreters (at least 50 hours)
6. Individual or group supervision and peer consultation
7. High standards of ethical practice
8. Knowledge of relevant ethical literature or decision-making models in interpreting

Specific knowledge and training in mental health contexts is necessary for adequate sign language interpreting for mental health clients. Accordingly, the State of Alabama requires "Certification of mental health interpreters for persons who are deaf" for interpreters to work in mental health contexts, and this certification must be renewed yearly by either: a) working 40 hours in clinical settings; b) attending 40 hours of training; or c) a combination of work in clinical settings and training equaling 40 hours. To provide the opportunity for education and training, the Alabama Department of Mental Health's Office of Deaf Services directed by Steve Hamerdinger established the Alabama's Mental Health Interpreter Training Project.

=== Attitudes about the use of interpretation in psychotherapy ===
According to psychologist Camilla Williams, "Deaf people enter therapy with the same problems as hearing people." As members of a linguistic minority, the ability to receive psychotherapy in their preferred language, independent of a translator can be difficult. Within the Deaf community, sign language fluency is considered very important when choosing a therapist. While it is preferred to have a therapist familiar with Deaf culture and fluent in American Sign Language the reality is that there are very few therapists having the specific skills necessary. This impacts the ability of both the client and the therapist to communicate effectively allowing for a therapeutic alliance to be formed. The addition of a translator shifts the dynamic between client and therapist. Research shows that while a well-qualified translator is appreciated, translation often creates additional challenges. It can be frustrating when the therapist believes that the translator is only for the client's comfort and not benefiting both parties.
