= Social impact of profound hearing loss =

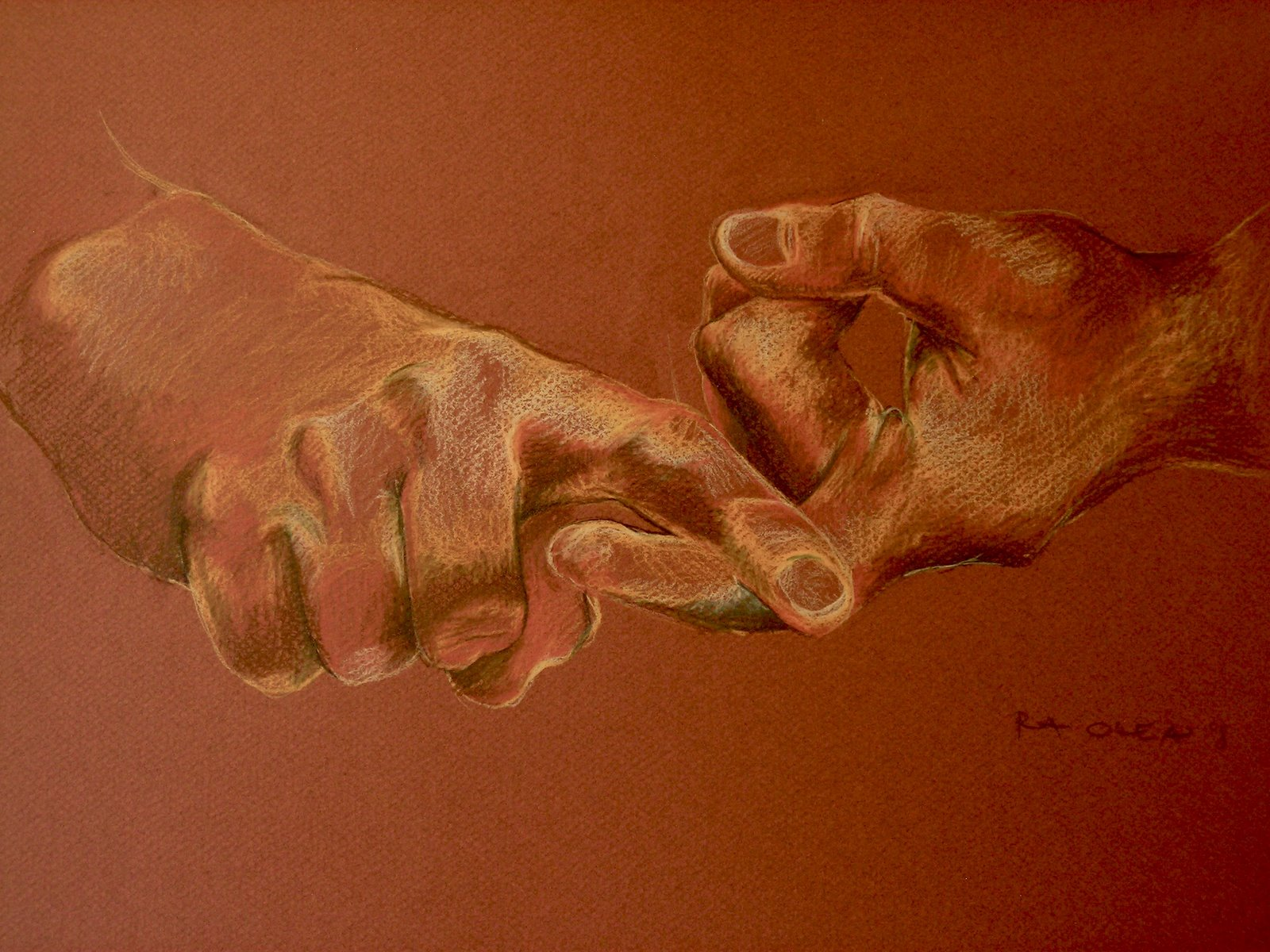
The sign language for "friend".

People with extreme hearing loss may communicate through sign languages. Sign languages convey meaning through manual communication and body language instead of acoustically conveyed sound patterns. This involves the simultaneous combination of hand shapes, orientation and movement of the hands, arms or body, and facial expressions to express a speaker's thoughts. "Sign languages are based on the idea that vision is the most useful tool a deaf person has to communicate and receive information".

Deaf culture refers to a tight-knit cultural group of people whose primary language is signed, and who practice social and cultural norms which are distinct from those of the surrounding hearing community. This community does not automatically include all those who are clinically or legally deaf, nor does it exclude every hearing person. According to Baker and Padden, it includes any person or persons who "identifies him/herself as a member of the Deaf community, and other members accept that person as a part of the community," an example being children of deaf adults with normal hearing ability. It includes the set of social beliefs, behaviors, art, literary traditions, history, values, and shared institutions of communities that are influenced by deafness and which use sign languages as the main means of communication. Members of the Deaf community tend to view deafness as a difference in human experience rather than a disability or disease. When used as a cultural label especially within the culture, the word deaf is often written with a capital D and referred to as "big D Deaf" in speech and sign. When used as a label for the audiological condition, it is written with a lower case d.

== Family ==
The communication limitations between people who are deaf and their hearing family members can often cause difficulties in family relationships, and affect the strength of relationships among individual family members. It was found that most people who are deaf have hearing parents, which means that the channel that the child and parents communicate through can be very different, often affecting their relationship in a negative way. If a parent communicates best verbally, and their child communicates best using sign language, this could result in ineffective communication between parents and children. Ineffective communication can potentially lead to fights caused by misunderstanding, less willingness to talk about life events and issues, and an overall weaker relationship. Even if individuals in the family made an effort to learn deaf communication techniques such as sign language, a deaf family member often will feel excluded from casual banter; such as the exchange of daily events and news at the dinner table. It is often difficult for people who are deaf to follow these conversations due to the fast-paced and overlapping nature of these exchanges. This can cause a deaf individual to become frustrated and take part in less family conversations. This can potentially result in weaker relationships between the hearing individual and their immediate family members. This communication barrier can have a particularly negative effect on relationships with extended family members as well. Communication between a deaf individual and their extended family members can be very difficult due to the gap in verbal and non-verbal communication. This can cause the individuals to feel frustrated and unwilling to put effort into communicating effectively. The lack of effort put into communicating can result in anger, miscommunication, and unwillingness to build a strong relationship.

== Community ==
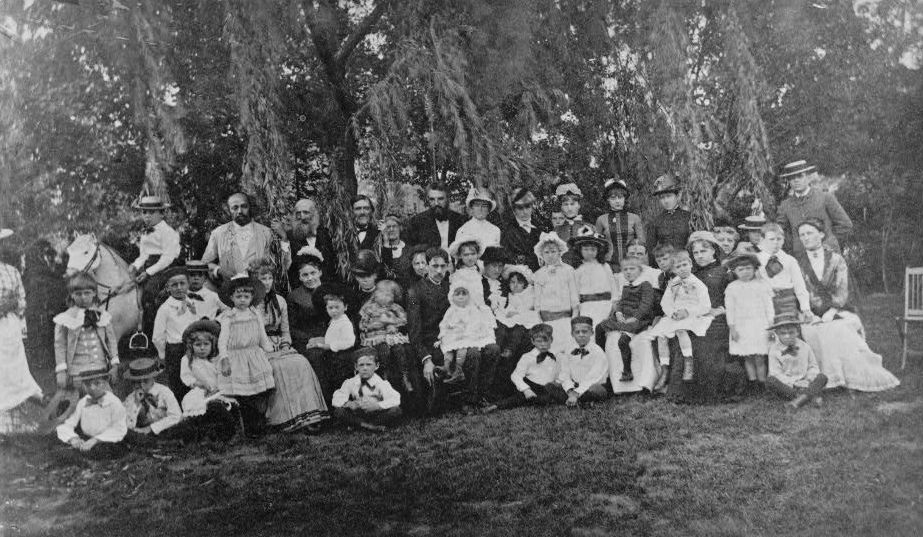
Alexander Graham Bell with teachers and students of the Scott Circle School for deaf children, Washington, D.C., 1883

People who have hearing loss can often experience many difficulties as a result of communication barriers among them and other hearing individuals in the community. Some major areas that can be impacted by this are involvement in extracurricular activities and social relationships. For young people, extracurricular activities are vehicles for physical, emotional, social, and intellectual development. However, it is often the case that communication barriers between people who are deaf and their hearing peers and coaches/club advisors limit them from getting involved. These communication barriers make it difficult for someone with a hearing loss to understand directions, take advice, collaborate, and form bonding relationships with other team or club members. As a result, extracurricular activities such as sports teams, clubs, and volunteering are often not as enjoyable and beneficial for individuals who have hearing loss, and they may engage in them less often. A lack of community involvement through extracurricular activities may also limit the individual's social network. In general, it can be difficult for someone who is deaf to develop and maintain friendships with their hearing peers due to the communication gap that they experience. They can often miss the jokes, informal banter, and "messing around" that is associated with the formation of many friendships among young people. Conversations between people who are deaf and their hearing peers can often be limited and short due to their differences in communication methods and lack of knowledge on how to overcome these differences. Deaf individuals can often experience rejection by hearing peers who are not willing to make an effort to find their way around communication difficulties. Patience and motivation to overcome such communication barriers is required by both the deaf or hard of hearing and hearing individuals in order to establish and maintain good friendships.

Many people tend to forget about the difficulties that deaf children encounter, as they view the deaf child differently from a deaf adult. Deaf children grow up being unable to fully communicate with their parents, siblings and other family members. Examples include being unable to tell their family what they have learned, what they did, asking for help, or even simply being unable to interact in daily conversation. Deaf children have to learn sign language and to read lips at a young age, however, they cannot communicate with others using it unless the others are educated in sign language as well. Children who are deaf or hard of hearing are faced with many complications while growing up, for example, some children have to wear hearing aids and others require assistance from sign language (ASL) interpreters. The interpreters help them to communicate with other individuals until they develop the skills they need to efficiently communicate on their own. Although growing up for deaf children may entitle more difficulties than for other children, there are many support groups that allow deaf children to interact with other children. This is where they develop friendships. There are also classes for young children to learn sign language in an environment that has other children in their same situation and around their same age. These groups and classes can be very beneficial in providing the child with the proper knowledge and not to mention the societal interactions that they need in order to live a healthy, young, playful and carefree life that any child deserves.

There are three typical adjustment patterns adopted by adults with hearing loss. The first one is to remain withdrawn into your own self. This provides a sense of safety and familiarity which can be a comforting way to lead your life. The second is to act "as if" one does not even have hearing loss. A positive attitude will help people to live a life with no barriers and thus, engage in optimal interaction. The final and third pattern is for the person to accept their hearing loss as a part of them without undervaluing oneself. This means understanding that one is forced to live life with this disability, however, it is not the only thing that constitutes life's meaning. Furthermore, many feel as if their inability to hear others during conversation is their fault. It's important that these individuals learn how to become more assertive individuals who do not lack fear when it comes to asking someone to repeat something or to speak a little louder. Although there is much fatigue and frustration that is produced from one's inability to hear, it is important to learn from personal experiences in order to improve on one's communication skills. In essence, these patterns will help adults with hearing loss deal with the communication barriers that are present.

== Workplace ==
In most instances, people who are deaf find themselves working with hearing colleagues, where they can often be cut off from the communication going on around them. Interpreters can be provided for meetings and workshops, however, are seldom provided for everyday work interactions. Communication of important information needed for jobs typically comes in the form of written or verbal summaries, which do not convey subtle meanings such as tone of voice, side conversations during group discussions, and body language. This can result in confusion and misunderstanding for the worker who is deaf, therefore making it harder to do their job effectively. Additionally, deaf workers can be unintentionally left out of professional networks, informal gatherings, and casual conversations among their collogues. Information about informal rules and organizational culture in the workplace is often communicated though these types of interactions, which puts the worker who is deaf at a professional and personal disadvantage. This could sever their job performance due to lack of access to information and therefore, reduce their opportunity to form relationships with their co-workers. Additionally, these communication barriers can all affect a deaf person's career development. Since being able to effectively communicate with one's co-workers and other people relevant to one's job is essential to managerial positions, people with hearing loss can often be denied such opportunities.

To avoid these situations in the workplace, individuals can take full-time or part-time sign language courses. In this way, they can become better able to communicate with the deaf and hard of hearing. Such courses teach the American Sign Language (ASL) language as most North Americans use this particular language to communicate. It is a visual language made up of specific gestures (signs), hand shapes, and facial expressions that contain their own unique grammatical rules and sentence structures By completing sign language courses, it ensures that deaf individuals feel a part of the workplace and have the ability to communicate with their co-workers and employer in the manner as other hearing employees do.

== Health care ==
Not only can communication barriers between deaf and hearing people affect family relationships, work, and school, but they can also have a very significant effect on a deaf individual's physical and mental health care. As a result of poor communication between the health care professional and the deaf or hard of hearing patient, many patients report that they are not properly informed about their disease and prognosis. This lack of or poor communication could also lead to other issues such as misdiagnosis, poor assessments, mistreatment, and even possibly harm to patients. Poor communication in this setting is often the result of health care providers having the misconception that all people who are deaf or hard of hearing have the same type of hearing loss, and require the same type of communication methods. In reality, there are many different types and range of hearing loss, and in order to communicate effectively a health care provider needs to understand that each individual with hearing loss has unique needs. This affects how individuals have been educated to communicate, as some communication methods work better depending on an individual's severity of hearing loss. For example, assuming every deaf or hard of hearing patient knows American Sign Language would be incorrect because there are different types of sign language, each varying in signs and meanings. A patient could have been educated to use cued speech which is entirely different from ASL. Therefore, in order to communicate effectively, a health care provider needs to understand that each individual has unique needs when communicating.

Although there are specific laws and rules to govern communication between health care professionals and people who are deaf, they are not always followed due to the health care professional's insufficient knowledge of communication techniques. This lack of knowledge can lead them to make assumptions about communicating with someone who is deaf, which can, in turn, cause them to use an unsuitable form of communication. Acts in countries such as the Americans with Disabilities Act (ADA) state that all health care providers are required to provide reasonable communication accommodations when caring for patients who are deaf. These accommodations could include qualified sign language interpreters, CDIs, and technology such as Internet interpretation services. A qualified sign language interpreter will enhance communication between a deaf individual and a health care professional by interpreting not only a health professional's verbal communication, but also their non-verbal such as expressions, perceptions, and body language. A Certified Deaf Interpreter (CDI) is a sign language interpreter who is also a member of the Deaf community. They accompany a sign language interpreter and are useful for communication with deaf individuals who also have language or cognitive deficits. A CDI will transform what the health care professional communicates into basic, simple language. This method takes much longer, however it can also be more effective than other techniques. Internet interpretation services are convenient and less costly, but can potentially pose significant risks. They involve the use of a sign language interpreter over a video device rather than directly in the room. This can often be an inaccurate form of communication because the interpreter may not be licensed, is often unfamiliar with the patient and their signs, and can lack knowledge of medical terminology.

Aside from utilizing interpreters, healthcare professionals can improve their communication with deaf or hard of hearing patients by educating themselves on common misconceptions and proper practices depending on the patient's needs. For example, a common misconception is that exaggerating words and speaking loudly will help the patient understand more clearly. However, many individuals with hearing loss depend on lip-reading to identify words. Exaggerated pronunciation and a raised voice can distort the lips, making it even more difficult to understand. Another common mistake health care professionals make are the use of single words rather than full sentences. Although language should be kept simple and short, keeping context is important because certain homophonous words are difficult to distinguish by lip-reading. Health care professionals can further improve their own communication with their patients by eliminating any background noise and positioning themselves in a way where their face is clearly visible to the patient, and suitably lit. The healthcare professional should know how to use body language and facial expressions to properly communicate different feelings.
