= Michael L. Perlin =

American lawyer

Michael L. Perlin is an American lawyer and professor at the New York Law School. He is an internationally recognized expert on "mental disability law" and how the legal system deals with individuals with mental disorders or intellectual disability. He has authored over 23 books and nearly 300 scholarly articles on the subject.

== Biography ==
Perlin started practicing law in New Jersey, US as a public criminal defense lawyer and mental health advocate for people with mental disabilities, and joined the New York Law School faculty in 1984. In 1985 he filed an amicus brief in Ake v. Oklahoma, in which the Supreme Court ruled that a person who is indigent has a right to receive a psychiatric evaluation, provided by the state, in cases where the insanity defense is being used.

Perlin has written extensively about "sanism", a concept created from the term "sane" by lawyer-physician Morton Birnbaum. Perlin refers to the widespread prejudice and discrimination that "permeates all aspects of mental disability law and affects all participants in the mental disability law system: litigants, fact finders, counsel, and expert and lay witnesses."

In 1996 Perlin wrote an article criticizing the Supreme Court decision Godinez v. Moran, as its repercussions were evident in what was widely considered a "charade" trial of mass murderer Colin Ferguson. Perlin entitled his paper "Dignity was the First to Leave" and since then has used Bob Dylan lyrics to name all of his scholarly law articles.

Perlin has said that he sums up the essence of his attempt to educate society about the manner in which sanist bias prevents equal justice in his ninth book The Hidden Prejudice: Mental Disability on Trial (2001). Professor of psychiatry Harvey Bluestone concluded in review that all psychiatrists should read Perlin, even though he sometimes presents them as responsible for alleged sanism.

Perlin sat on the board of the International Academy of Law and Mental Health for 20 years and worked extensively with Mental Disability Rights International, providing training and workshops in nations such as Hungary and Latvia. Since the receipt of funding in 2008, and as part of his work with the Justice Action Center, Perlin has been collaborating with advocates from Japan, Australia, and the Pacific Rim to create the Disability Rights Tribunal for Asia and the Pacific (DRTAP).

== Bibliography ==
- Perlin, Michael L (2013). A Prescription for Dignity: Rethinking Criminal Justice and Mental Disability Law. Surrey, England: Ashgate Publishing Limited. ISBN 978-0-7546-9440-3.
- Perlin, Michael L (2000). The hidden prejudice: mental disability on trial. Washington, DC: American Psychological Association. ISBN 978-1-55798-616-0.
- Perlin, Michael L (2013). Mental disability and the death penalty: the shame of the states. Lanham, Md.: Rowman & Littlefield. ISBN 978-1-4422-0056-2.
- Perlin, Michael L (2012). International human rights and mental disability law: when the silenced are heard. Oxford; New York: Oxford University Press. ISBN 978-0-19-539323-1.
- Perlin, Michael L; Lynch, Alison J (2016). Sexuality, disability, and the law: beyond the last frontier?. Palgrave Macmillan US. ISBN 978-1-137-48107-8.
- Perlin, Michael L (2008). Competence in the law: from legal theory to clinical application. Hoboken, N.J.: John Wiley & Sons. ISBN 978-0-470-14420-6.
- Perlin, Michael L (2006). International human rights and comparative mental disability law: cases and materials. Durham, N.C.: Carolina Academic Press. ISBN 978-1-59460-210-8.
- Perlin, Michael L (1994). The jurisprudence of the insanity defense. Durham, N.C.: Carolina Academic Press. ISBN 978-0-89089-555-9.
- Perlin, Michael L (1998). Mental disability law: civil and criminal. LEXIS Law Pub. ISBN 978-0-327-00493-6.

== Personal life ==
Perlin has played clarinet for the Lawrence Township Community Band, and is a fan of baseball and opera. Perlin is also a huge fan of Bob Dylan, having seen him many times live and titling many of his law review articles with Dylan lyrics.
