= The Meteor =

American newspaper

The Meteor was an internal newspaper written, edited, printed and published by the patients of the Alabama Insane Hospital, soon renamed as the Bryce Hospital after superintendent Dr. Peter Bryce, from 1872 to 1881.

== History ==
It was originally intended for the benefit of the patients and to explain the practical operation of the institution to its patrons. Later, it was used to inform the friends and patrons of the hospital, state newspaper editors, and state legislators of the condition and purposes of the hospital. In 1873 the editors of the American Journal of Insanity noted that the Meteor was only the third paper edited and printed by patients in an insane asylum in the United States. The other two newspapers were The Opal, written and published by the patients of the New York State Lunatic Asylum at Utica and another entitled the Asylum Journal, published by the patients at the Vermont State Hospital in Brattleboro.

Although Dr. Bryce boasted of the paper as his institution's "remarkable enterprise", he did not himself take part in it.

The Meteor's editor replied to accusations that the true editor of the paper was the superintendent by saying that although "as in the United States we have a troop of the craziest sane folks the world ever knew, so also we can boast some of the sanest crazy ones", who were responsible for the paper. The "sanest crazy" folk conducted this "remarkable enterprise," providing lucid and readable prose and a nearly unique window into a mental hospital which was, at and for that time, surprisingly progressive.
