= Lexington School and Center for the Deaf =

- East Elmhurst, Queens, New York City; United States

Information
- Type: Private, state-supported
- Established: 1864
- Staff: 350
- Enrollment: 330
- Campus: Closed urban campus
- Colors: Blue and white
- Mascot: Blue jay
- Website: www.lexnyc.org

Lexington School and Center for the Deaf comprises the Lexington School for the Deaf, the Lexington Hearing and Speech Center, Lexington Vocational Services, and the Lexington Center for Mental Health in New York City, aimed at serving the deaf and hard of hearing community.

== Lexington School for the Deaf ==
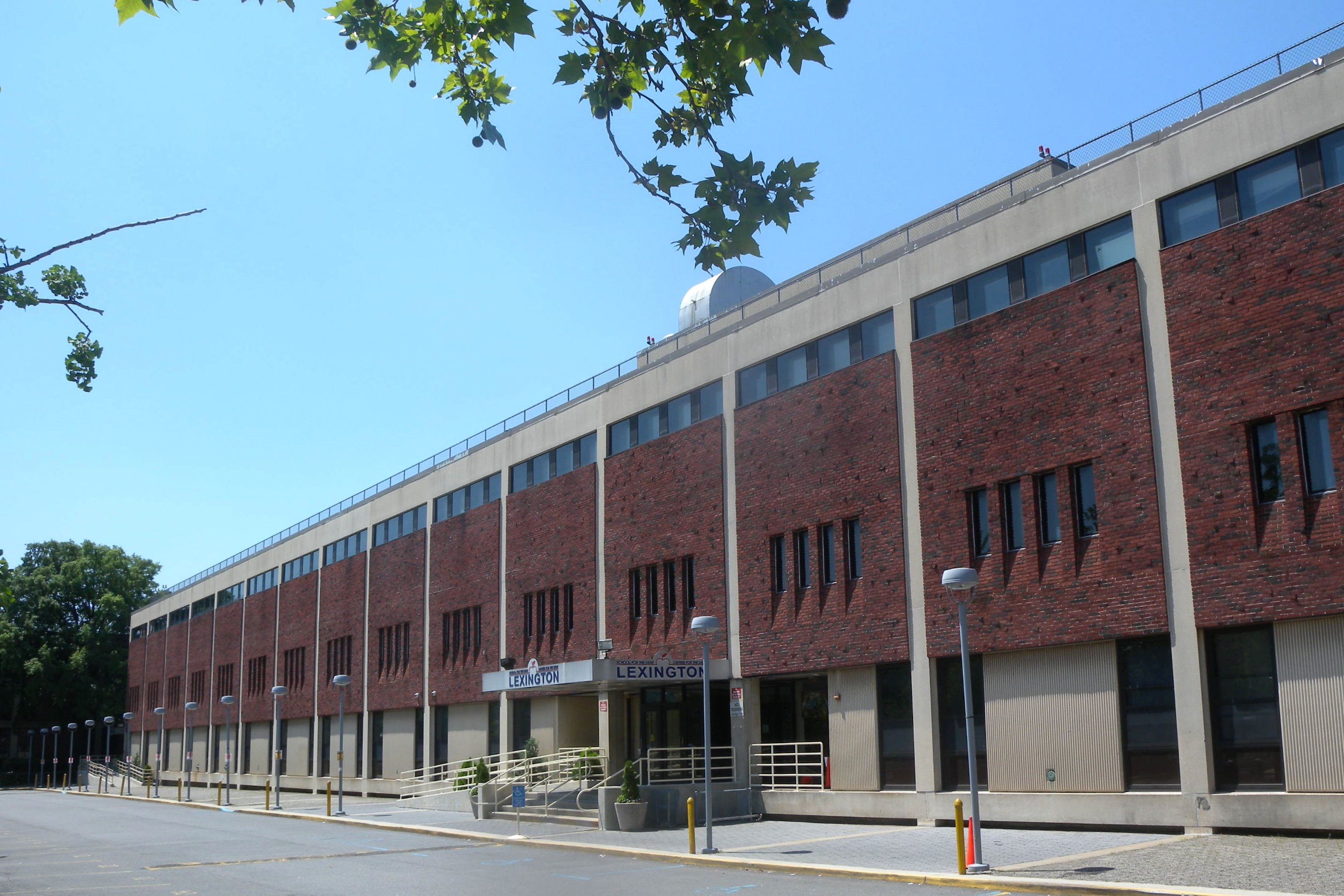
Lexington School for the Deaf

The Lexington School for the Deaf was founded in 1864. It is the oldest school for the deaf in New York. According to The Encyclopedia of Special Education, the school was "a pioneer in oral education", as other schools for the deaf in the United States relied solely on sign language at the time. It has become a "world-renowned leader" for its work with infants, children and adolescents.

The school takes students from birth to 21 years of age. The student body is racially, ethnically, and linguistically diverse. Many have other disabilities, such as mobility and mental impairments, and most live below the poverty threshold set by New York City. The school's focus is on, in addition to assisting students in living with their disabilities, preparing them for higher education with an academic curriculum compliant with the New York State Education Department standards from preschool to its fully accredited high school. The school utilizes a "mediated learning experience" (MLE) approach which provides training for parents and teachers as part of its emphasis on the importance of adult mediators to education. The school uses American Sign Language (abbreviated ASL) and English for instruction.

In 1994, the school was subject to a community protest following the appointment of a hearing chairman of the board without what protesters felt was adequate representation of the deaf community in the selection process. Following picket lines and other protest measures, Phil Bravin was placed in the position; Bravin had become the first deaf chair of the Gallaudet University Board following a similar protest in 1988.

== Lexington Hearing & Speech Center ==
The Lexington Hearing & Speech Center is a medical center that provides clinical services in hearing and speech to people in New York City's five boroughs, including infants, children, adults, and seniors. Beyond attempting to determine the cause of speech and language difficulty, the center focuses on medical and rehabilitative care, with a specialty in hearing aids. They operate a Mobile Hearing Evaluation Unit which visits seniors and residences throughout the New York City metropolitan area to conduct hearing tests and evaluate and analyze hearing aids already in use.

== Lexington Vocational Services Center ==
The Lexington Vocational Services Center, which has offices in New York and New Jersey, is intended to help deaf adults prepare for and obtain employment and also to help employers maintain deaf-friendly workplaces. They also host ASL classes for the community and employers.

== Lexington Center for Mental Health Services ==
The Lexington Center for Mental Health Services provides mental health services to deaf adults and children, including evaluation, medication and treatment for those with mental illness and counseling for deaf parents of hearing children and hearing parents of deaf children.
