= Bazelon Center for Mental Health Law =

American nonprofit organization

- Named after: David L. Bazelon
- Formation: 1972; 54 years ago
- Type: Non-profit
- Tax ID no.: 23-7268143
- Location: 1101 15th Street NW, Washington, DC
- Coordinates: 38°54′15″N 77°2′2″W
- Region served: United States
- CEO: Holly O'Donnell
- Deputy Director: Jennifer Mathis
- Legal Director: Megan Schuller
- Revenue: 4,652,614 (FY 2024)
- Expenses: 1,920,143 (FY 2024)
- Website: bazelon.org
- Formerly called: The Mental Health Law Project

The Bazelon Center for Mental Health Law is a national legal-advocacy organization representing people with mental disabilities in the United States. Originally known as The Mental Health Law Project, the Center was founded as a national public-interest organization in 1972 by a group of specialized attorneys and mental disability professionals who were working to help the court define a constitutional right to treatment in terms of specific standards for services and protections. In 1993, the organization changed its name to the Judge David L. Bazelon Center for Mental Health Law to honor the legacy of Judge David L. Bazelon, whose decisions as Chief Judge of the United States Court of Appeals for the District of Columbia Circuit had pioneered the field of mental health law.

== Litigation ==
The Center's precedent-setting litigation has established important civil rights for people with mental illnesses or developmental disabilities. These include the right to treatment in Wyatt v. Stickney (decided in 1971 and successfully concluded in 1999), and the Supreme Court's 1999 Olmstead v. L.C. ex rel. Zimring decision affirming the right of people with disabilities to receive public services in the most integrated setting consistent with their needs.

== Federal policy ==
The Center also engages in federal policy advocacy, working with Congress and the administrative agencies to ensure for example, that people with mental disabilities are included under the protections of the Americans with Disabilities Act and amendments to the federal Fair Housing Act, and to generate resources such as Supplemental Security Income and Medicaid that can enable them to live and thrive in the community. In 2009, a major thrust was the integration of mental health in healthcare reform.

== Publications ==
The Bazelon Center's publications include reports; issue papers; law, regulation, and policy analyses; advocacy manuals; and consumer-friendly guides to legal rights. These are available for free download from the center's website, or print copies may be ordered by postal mail, telephone, or email.

== Funding ==
During the 2015 fiscal year, most of the Bazelon Center's revenue came from contributions, gifts, and grants. Notable organizations providing grant support to the Bazelon Center include the Open Society Foundations and the MacArthur Foundation. Beginning in 1978, the MacArthur Foundation has awarded multiple grants to the Bazelon Center, totaling $14,035,000 as of 2016.

== See also ==
- Morton Birnbaum
- Public interest law
