= Partlow Center =

School for people with disabilities in Alabama, US

William D. Partlow Developmental Center, also known as the Partlow State School and Hospital, was a state school for people with mental disabilities, primarily intellectual and developmental disabilities in Tuscaloosa, Alabama, US. It was operated by the Alabama Department of Mental Health. It was the last such full-sized facility operated by the State of Alabama and closed in 2011.

== History ==
=== Founding ===
Partlow Center was the third mental health facility to open in Alabama. The first was Bryce Hospital, initially known as the Alabama Insane Hospital. It was proposed to the state Legislature in 1836 by Dorothea Dix, a pioneering reformer in the treatment of mental illness, and accepted its first patient in 1861. Dix had traveled the country urging the creation of a system of humane care to replace practices such as locking away the mentally ill in jails with felons or the unregulated and underfunded system of towns contracting with individuals to provide housing—a system rife with abuse.

Searcy Hospital opened in 1902 to serve the mentally ill in the southern part of the state.

Partlow, which opened in 1923 to care for the intellectually disabled, was located about two miles away from Bryce Hospital in Tuscaloosa, Ala., and was under the supervision of the superintendent of Bryce although it had a separate board of trustees.

Early in the 1900s, doctors in Alabama had adopted a eugenics model to think about mental disabilities. They sought to segregate people with disabilities and also forcibly sterilize them so they would not have children, who the doctors believed would also be "mentally-deficient." In 1915, doctors from the Medical Association of the State of Alabama formed the Alabama Society for Mental Hygiene, led by William Partlow, to research and advocate for care for "mental defectives." In 1919, the state legislature of Alabama passed a bill allowing for the creation of a home for the feeble-minded. This bill also gave the superintendent of the school the power to sterilize the patients without consent.

As the Alabama Home for the Feeble-Minded, Partlow began operations in 1919 with William Partlow as the superintendent. Its final facility opened in 1923. Only two months after opening, the institution was full of people that had been transferred from poorhouses, jails, orphanages, and other institutions. In 1925, Partlow had 277 patients. In 1927, the school was renamed the Partlow State School for Mental Deficients, after eugenicist William D. Partlow.

Partlow, like the two institutions for the mentally ill, included a large farm that was operated by the residents who were able, making the institution nearly self-sufficient.

==== Compulsory sterilizations ====
The same law that authorized the creation of the state school allowed the superintendent to forcibly sterilize the "inmates". William Partlow, as both the proponent of the law and the founding superintendent, used that power to sterilize every inmate upon their release from the state school.

In 1923, Partlow became the superintendent of Alabama Insane Hospitals as well as the state school. He continued to advocate for more laws about compulsory sterilization. In 1934, he proposed a bill that would allow for sterilizations of every patient upon release (something he was already doing), as well as forming boards of doctors that would design on groups to be sterilized. It would also allow every superintendent of an institution to sterilize inmates. The bill passed both houses of the Alabama legislature but was vetoed by the governor, who was worried about its constitutionality. Parlow re-introduced the bill, where it was vetoed by the governor. After this, he halted the use of involuntary sterilizations on his patients. Partlow continued to try to pass legislation through 1945, when the tide was turning against eugenics due to its association with Nazi Germany.

In total, 224 people were sterilized in Alabama. The vast majority of them were at either the state school or Bryce Hospital.

=== Wyatt v. Stickney ===
Huge budget cuts and overcrowding at state hospitals led to Wyatt v. Stickney, which was filed in October 1970. The lawsuit was originally filed by laid-off employees at Bryce Hospital. They included Ricky Wyatt, a 15 year old "juvenile delinquent" who had been placed there by the courts without a mental health diagnosis. The case became much more about patient rights than about employee rights and the scope of the case grew to encompass Mount Searcy Hospital and Partlow State School.

==== Conditions at State Schools and Hospitals ====
At the time, Alabama was ranked last in the country for state funding for people with mental illness or developmental disabilities. The state spent 50 cents per day on each patient. At Bryce, there was one psychiatrist per 1,700 patients. At Partlow, the conditions were dire. Jack Drake, one of the plaintiffs' attorneys, has discussed the conditions at Partlow:

"I remember one of the things I did before the hearing was to review the accidental deaths of people who died at Partlow for a two-year-period and the extreme examples were residents who would get up in the middle of the night—go to one ward, maybe leave the door open and go into another ward, get into an unlocked medicine cabinet and eat the contents of 40 bottles and die."

Mr. Drake investigated a gruesome incident in which a boy with developmental disabilities had a garden hose inserted in his rectum, filling it with water and rupturing his spleen and killing him. Other examples of atrocious incidents presented to the court included a resident who was scalded to death as well as a resident who was restrained in a strait jacket for nine years to prevent hand and finger sucking.

Another finding is that none of the institutions in Alabama had any working fire safety plan. Bryce had fire hydrants, but they would not work with the fire engine hoses in use at the time. The Partlow phone system shut down at 5:00 pm, making it impossible for anyone to even call the fire department.

Reporter Hal Martin, who covered the case, compared the conditions of the institutions to Nazi concentration camps, mentioning his experiences covering war crime trials after WWII.

==== Decision ====
The case resulted in new federal minimum standards for federal minimum standards for the care of people with mental illness or developmental disabilities who reside in institutional settings. The standards elaborated in that agreement have served as a model nationwide. Known as the "Wyatt Standards", they are founded on four criteria for evaluation of care:

- Humane psychological and physical environment
- Qualified and sufficient staff for administration of treatment
- Individualized treatment plans
- Minimum restriction of patient freedom.

==== Long Road to Compliance ====
The case of Wyatt v. Stickney came to a conclusion after 33 years, through the tenure of nine Alabama governors and fourteen state mental health commissioners, the longest mental health case in national history. The case was finally dismissed on December 5, 2003, with the finding by Judge Myron H. Thompson that Alabama was in compliance with the agreement.

=== Deinstitutionalization Movement ===
Wyatt v. Stickney resulted in increased awareness of the horrific conditions at Partlow State School and other developmental centers were built in the 1970s to reduce overcrowding. Wyatt also resulted in the first state funding for community services, such as group homes for people with disabilities in Alabama. Over the next couple decades, more and more people would receive services in the community.

By 2004, all state developmental centers (their term for state schools) were closed except for Partlow. Some residents were moved from those institutions into Partlow Center.

In 2009, Alabama Disabilities Advocacy Program (ADAP), the Alabama protection and advocacy organization, issued a report, "At What Cost: Partlow's Legacy of Shame". This report called for the immediate closure of Partlow. Ellen Gillespie, the executive director of ADAP said:

"In the one remaining institution, the W. D. Partlow Developmental Center in Tuscaloosa, costs have soared beyond a tolerable level. Despite the huge budget, people live in filthy conditions. Their lives are filled with time-wasting activities intended to keep them quiet and compliant. They are subject to abuse and neglect and, most cruelly, to being ignored day after day. Partlow has repeatedly failed to meet basic health and safety standards monitored by external funding agencies. In this report we identify the many reasons why the W. D. Partlow Developmental Center must be closed. And, the sooner the better. The people who live at Partlow can be supported well for less money. It is not too late for individuals to have good lives with meaningful work, privacy, friends, and involvement with their communities and churches.There are no shortcuts. It is not enough to think that "changes" can be made to Partlow to improve it. Pouring good money after bad will not fix the problem. There is only one solution, and the people who live at Partlow told us that solution over and over. They know where they want to live. It is time for Alabama to listen to their voices."

=== Closure ===
In 2011, it had 151 patients. On March 4, 2011, the state decided to move the patients out of the facility, with a target shutdown date being September 30, 2011. Community-based facilities were to receive the patients. As area mental health facilities by other organizations had vacancies, employees at Partlow were encouraged to apply there. However the departure of the last patient did not occur until December 28, 2011.

In response to the closure, Jeff Ridgeway, president of the self-advocacy group People First of Alabama, said, "This is a great day for people with intellectual disabilities because it makes the statement loud and clear that we are people with abilities and we want to be integrated into society rather than segregated into an institution." Paul Davis, who witnessed the conditions at Partlow in the 1960s, said, "It was awful in so many ways. It was a place where humans became 'things,' things that didn't matter. A hellish place that never belonged in a humane society." In 2014, Bryce Hospital relocated to the Partlow property. There is also a cemetery where residents of the state school were buried.
