= Ricky J. Wyatt =

Ricky J. Wyatt (1954 – November 1, 2011)was the lead plaintiff in a landmark class-action federal lawsuit, Wyatt v. Stickney, protesting conditions in Bryce Hospital in Tuscaloosa, Alabama. The suit led to a landmark judgment that gave the federal government control of Alabama’s mental institutions and defined minimum constitutional standards and national guidelines for psychiatric care across the United States, known as the Wyatt Standards.

Wyatt was born in Tuscaloosa, Alabama, and was sent to a reform school as a teenager. Alabama law at the time made it easy to put people in mental institutions. Wyatt, at the time living at a children’s home, was committed to Bryce on the recommendation of his probation officer. The lawsuit began after state budget cuts caused the hospital to lay off workers. Among the workers was Wyatt's aunt, Mildred Rawlins, who along with other laid off workers asked Wyatt to be the lead plaintiff in the lawsuit.

Wyatt later worked in Florida and other states. After a fall from a ladder while working as a painter, he used a walker or a wheelchair. At the time of his death, he lived in Cottondale, Alabama.
