= Searcy Hospital =

- State of Alabama
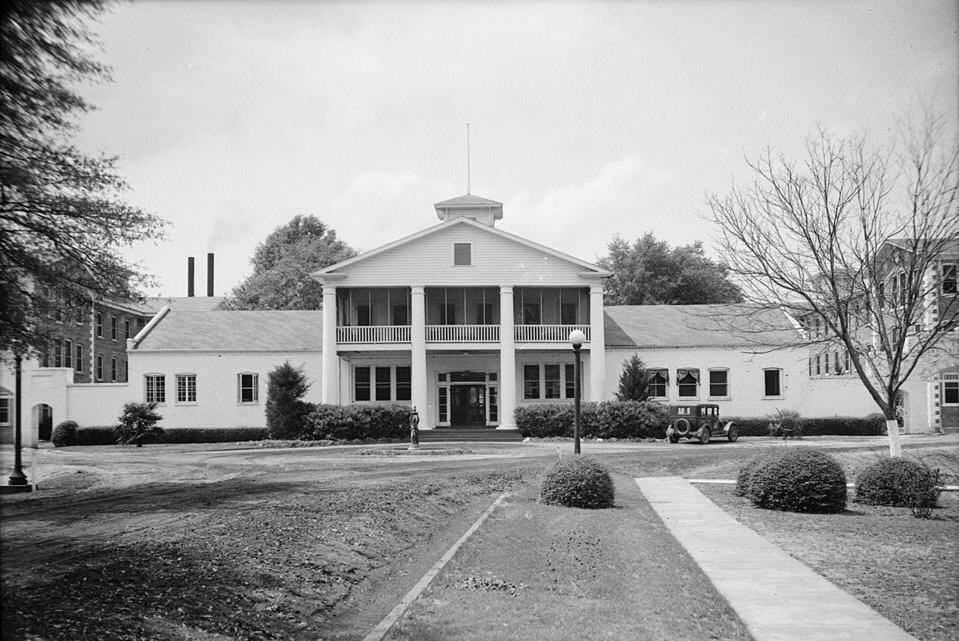
- The Administration Building at Searcy in 1935

Geography
- Location: Mount Vernon, Alabama, United States
- Coordinates: 31.09034°N 88.02986°W

Organization
- Type: Specialist

Services
- Beds: 525
- Speciality: Psychiatric

History
- Former name: Mount Vernon Insane Hospital
- Opened: 1902
- Closed: October 31, 2012

Links
- Lists: Hospitals in Alabama

Searcy Hospital was a state-owned and operated psychiatric hospital in Mount Vernon, Alabama. It was situated on the grounds of the former Mount Vernon Arsenal, a former United States Army munitions depot dating back to 1828. It closed permanently on October 31, 2012. It was also known for holding an Apache warrior and leader from the 1800s, whose name was Geronimo. It is currently an abandoned site and in disrepair, but protected by local authorities.

== History ==
In 1900, the Alabama Legislature established a mental health facility on the former site of the Mount Vernon Arsenal to relieve overcrowding at Bryce Hospital in Tuscaloosa. The new facility was named the Mount Vernon Insane Hospital upon its opening in 1902 but was renamed Searcy Hospital in 1919, in honor of Dr. J. T. Searcy, the first superintendent. It was initially known as the Mount Vernon Insane Hospital, the hospital for colored insane or the Mount Vernon Hospital for the Colored Insane, since it served African-Americans exclusively until 1969, when it was desegregated following the Civil Rights Act of 1964.

In 1906, 57 patients died due to an outbreak of a disease at the hospital. Initially the disease was a mystery, but it was later identified as one of the first major outbreaks of pellagra in the United States. The cause of pellagra was a mystery at the time, but one of the key observations was that it only struck the patients, not the staff. Joseph Goldberger later identified the cause of pellagra as a vitamin deficiency. It was caused by a poor, corn-based, diet at the hospital that was deficient in niacin.

In 2010 Searcy Hospital had approximately 400 extended-care beds and a 124-bed intermediate care unit for patients with severe mental illness. Patients were housed in modern buildings. It also served the female forensic in-patient psychiatric center for the southern one-third of Alabama. It was announced on February 15, 2012 that the Alabama Department of Mental Health would close Searcy and all but two of its other state-run mental health facilities in a move to transition all but its forensic and geriatric patients to community-based treatment. All admissions to Searcy were stopped in September, with the entire facility closing on October 31, 2012.
