= Steve Hamerdinger =

American deaf professional and advocate

Steven Hamerdinger
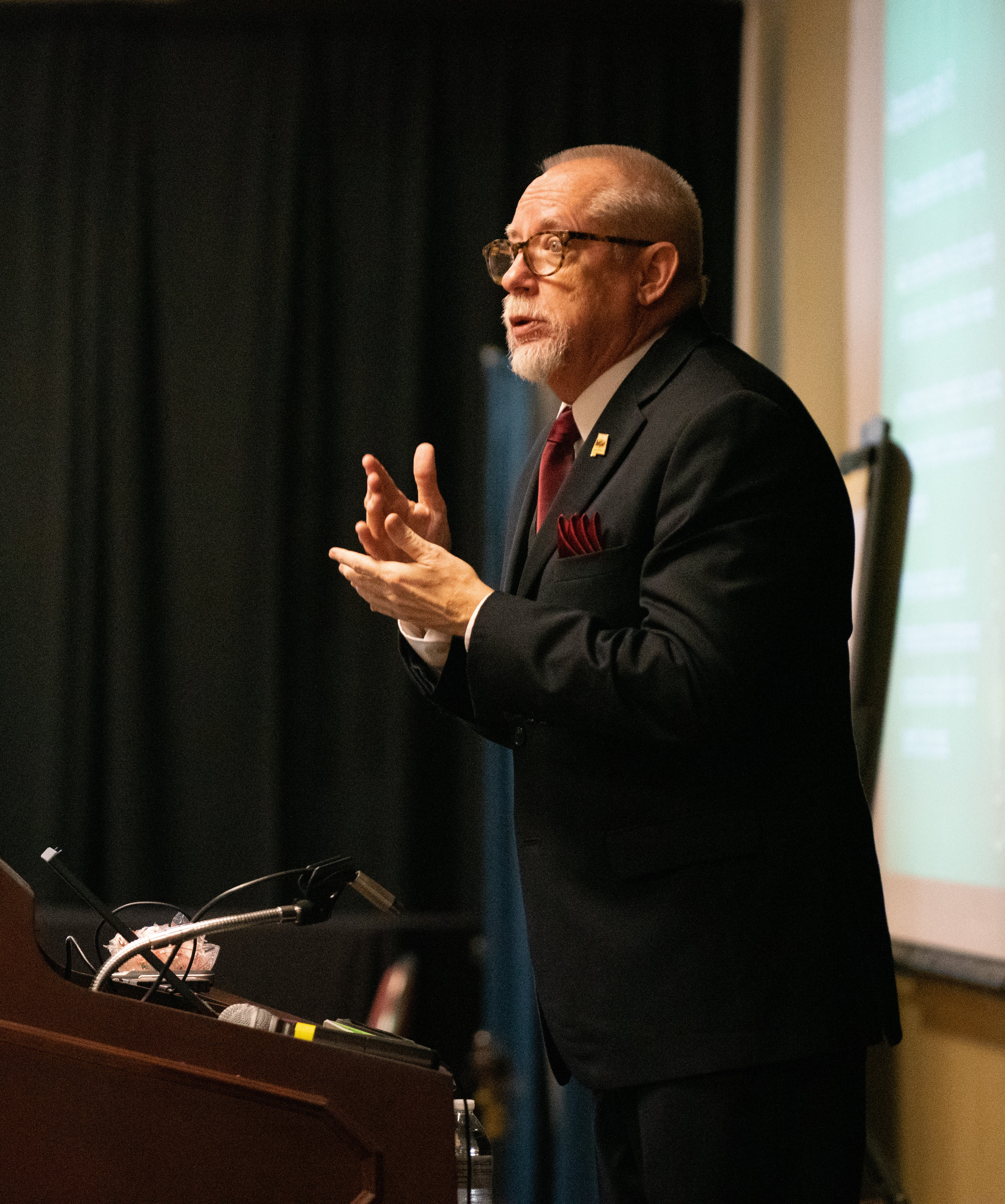
- Steve Hamerdinger, 2019
- Born: Maryland, U.S.
- Education: Temple Deaf College (BA); University of Kansas; Gallaudet University (MA)
- Occupations: Deaf professional; advocate

Steve Hamerdinger is an American deaf professional and advocate for deaf and hard of hearing people. He served as the Director of Deaf Services for the Alabama Department of Mental Health until he retired in March 2024. His work revolves around contexts related to deaf and hard of hearing persons and their mental well-being from childhood to end of life. He is an advocate for Deaf rights and has been a prominent influence in this field since the early 1980s.

== Education ==
Steve Hamerdinger earned his B.A. from Temple Deaf College in 1977. He completed coursework on Educational Psychology and Human Development at University of Kansas, and completed a Master's of Arts in Counseling in 1989 from Gallaudet University.

== Professional work ==
At the New Mexico School for the Deaf, Hamerdinger worked as a child therapist beginning in 1989, establishing a then novel in-school mental health program. His work there focused on deaf children and their families.

He helped establish the New Mexico Commission for the Deaf and Hard of Hearing. He was also a past president of the New Mexico Association of the Deaf. Before moving to Alabama in 2003, Hamerdinger was the Director of the Office of Deaf and Linguistic Support Services at the Missouri Department of Mental Health.

In 2009, Hamerdinger was appointed by the U.S. Department of Health and Human Services as a representative at the International Initiative for Mental Health Leadership Network on Mental Health and Deaf Individuals.

Hamerdinger, is a past-President of the American Deafness and Rehabilitation Association.

As the former director of Deaf Services in the Alabama Department of Mental Health, Hamerdinger worked to make sure that services were provided to deaf people with mental illnesses in Alabama. The services his department offer included consulting, advocacy, and teaching and continued education. The purpose behind their program is for deaf people to be assisted with their mental health by counselors who also know American Sign Language.

== Awards ==
In 2021, Hamerdinger was presented with the Boyce R. Williams Award in recognition of a lifetime of exemplary contributions that lead to the improvement in the lives of deaf people in the rehabilitation and behavioral health arenas.

He is the recipient of the 2015 Frederick C. Schreiber Award that recognizes individuals for exemplary work in government service for specialized programs for deaf and hard of hearing populations. He was also awarded the Alice Cogswell Award in 2010 which is used to recognize persons who have made respectable contributions to the deaf community. In 2008 Deaf Life magazine named Hamerdinger the "Deaf Person of the Month."

He was presented with the Knights of Flying Fingers award by the National Association of the Deaf and Mental Health Subcommittee in 2016 and elected to the board of directors of NAD in 2018.

== Personal life ==
Hamerdinger was born in Maryland to hearing parents. He attended public schools in Prince George's County until he was a Junior at Parkdale Senior High. He then dropped out of school, due to lack of support services, as was common in the late 60s and early 70s. He was admitted to Gallaudet University by testing the next year.

He currently lives in Montgomery, Alabama. Although he is retired, he still occasionally lectures, teaches and consults on deaf mental health care. He frequently uses comedy routines as a method for coping with and helping others cope with mental illness.
