= Mount Vernon Arsenal =

- Mount Vernon Arsenal-Searcy Hospital Complex
- U.S. National Register of Historic Places
- U.S. Historic district
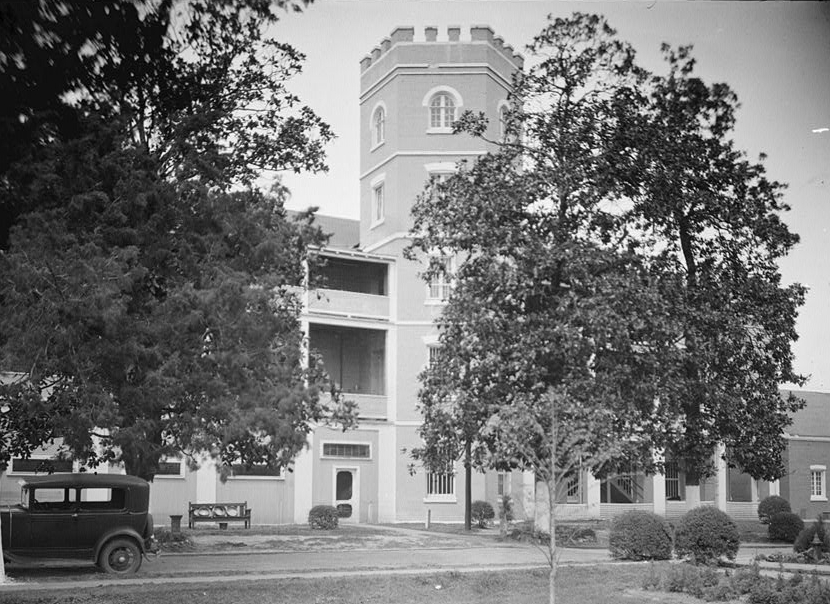
- The old barracks building in 1935

- Location within Alabama Location within the United States
- Location: Mobile County, Alabama
- Nearest city: Mount Vernon, Alabama
- Coordinates: 31°5′16″N 88°1′44″W
- Area: 36 acres (15 ha)
- Architectural style: Classical Revival, Greek Revival
- NRHP reference No.: 88000676
- Added to NRHP: May 26, 1988

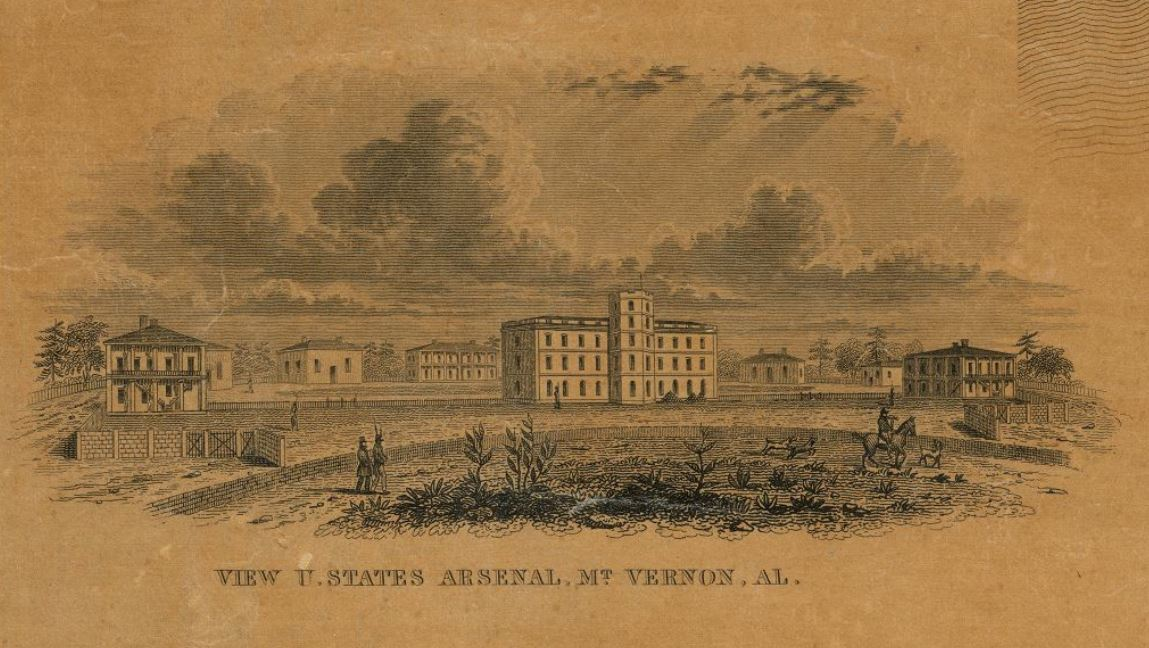
1837 sketch of Mount Vernon Arsenal by John La Tourrette

The Mount Vernon Arsenal in Mount Vernon, Alabama is a former United States Army munitions depot (arsenal), was used as a prison for captured Native Americans, and was served as a psychiatric hospital. The site is home to the now-closed Searcy Hospital. It was listed on the National Register of Historic Places on May 26, 1988, as the Mount Vernon Arsenal-Searcy Hospital Complex. Mount Vernon Arsenal was named to the 2025 Places in Peril list of Alabama's most vulnerable buildings by the Alabama Historical Commission.

== History ==
The Mount Vernon Arsenal was established by the United States Army near the Mobile River, three miles west of Fort Stoddert, and approximately 30 miles inland from the Gulf of Mexico. Along with the Kennebec Arsenal in Augusta, Maine, it is one of the most complete antebellum arsenals surviving to the present day. Established in 1828 as an ordnance manufacturing base, the Mount Vernon Arsenal served as one of the U.S. Army's main ammunition plants from its inception until the Civil War.

On January 4, 1861, troops of the Alabama state militia took possession of the arsenal on the orders of Alabama governor Andrew B. Moore. The takeover from the small US Army force, commanded by Captain Jesse L. Reno, was peaceful and bloodless. After Alabama joined with other seceded states to form the Confederacy, the Arsenal was turned over to the Confederate Army for the duration of the war. In 1862, after the Battle of New Orleans, the Confederacy moved ammunition manufacturing from the Mount Vernon Arsenal to Selma, Alabama. Selma offered a more secure location farther away from Union forces.

The Confederate Army held the Arsenal almost until the end of the Civil War. After the war was over, the arsenal was returned to the federal government and the site was renamed the Mount Vernon Barracks. From 1887 to 1894 the Barracks was used as a prison for captured Apache people, including Geronimo and his followers. In addition to its use as a prison, it was also used to assimilate the Apache and other Native Americans using methods decried by advocacy groups, and in 1891, the Mount Vernon Barracks Company I of the Twelfth Infantry was organized as the first military troop containing Native American prisoners of war. Walter Reed, the United States Army physician who confirmed that yellow fever is spread by mosquitoes, served as post surgeon in the 1880s. In 1895, the site was deeded to the state of Alabama. In 1910, the arsenal was adapted into a mental hospital for Black patients initially called the Mount Vernon Insane Hospital, the Mount Vernon Hospital for the Colored Insane, or just Mount Vernon Hospital, but in 1919 it was renamed to Searcy Hospital. The facility was segregated until 1969 and was closed in 2012. On April 10, 2026, the tower arsenal was heavily damaged in a fire that collapsed the roof and took more than 20 fire departments 6 hours to extinguish.

== See also ==
- National Register of Historic Places listings in Mobile County, Alabama
