= Bryce Hospital =

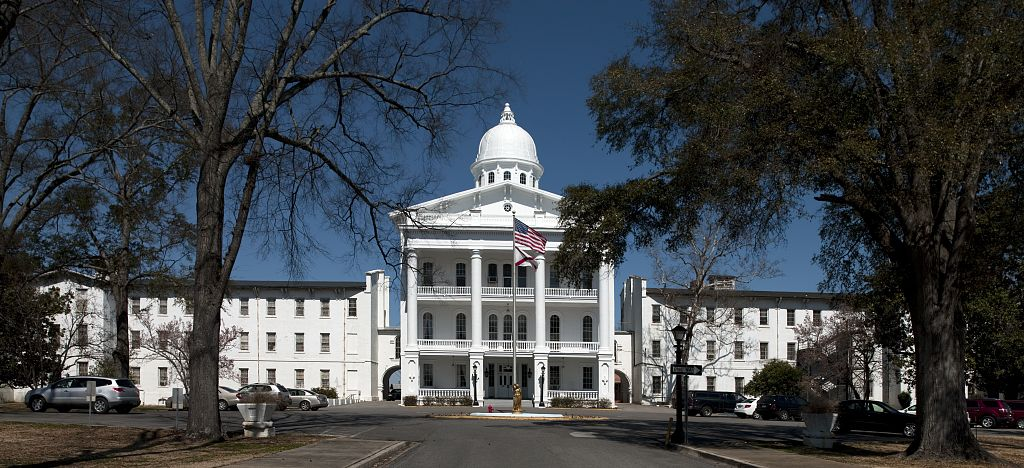
- Front of Administration Building, the first and oldest building on campus, completed in 1859.

Geography
- Location: Tuscaloosa, Alabama, United States
- Coordinates: 33°12′59″N 87°32′18″W

Organization
- Care system: Public
- Type: Specialist

Services
- Beds: 268
- Speciality: Psychiatric hospital

History
- Founded: 1861

Links
- Lists: Hospitals in Alabama
- Alabama Insane Hospital
- U.S. National Register of Historic Places
- Location within Alabama Location within the United States
- Location: University Blvd., Tuscaloosa, Alabama
- Area: 17 acres (7 ha)
- Built: 1853–59
- Architect: Sloan, Samuel, et al.; Stewart
- Architectural style: Mixed (more than 2 styles from different periods), Italianate, Roman Revival
- NRHP reference No.: 77000216
- Added to NRHP: April 18, 1977

Bryce Hospital opened in 1861 in Tuscaloosa, Alabama, United States. It is Alabama's oldest and largest inpatient psychiatric facility. First known as the Alabama State Hospital for the Insane and later as the Alabama Insane Hospital, the building is considered an architectural model. The hospital houses 268 beds for acute care, treatment and rehabilitation of full-time (committed) patients. The Mary Starke Harper Geriatric Psychiatry Hospital, a separate facility on the same campus, provides an additional 100 beds for inpatient geriatric care. The main facility was added to the National Register of Historic Places in 1977.

== History ==
The plans for a state hospital for the mentally ill in Alabama began in 1852. The new facility was planned from the start to utilize the "moral architecture" concepts of 1830s activists Thomas Story Kirkbride and Dorothea Dix. Dix's reformist ideas, in particular, are credited as the driving force behind the construction of the hospital. Architect Samuel Sloan designed the Italianate building using the Kirkbride Plan. Construction of the building began in 1853 but was not completed until 1859. The hospital was the first building in Tuscaloosa with gas lighting and central heat, "all clad in a fashionable Italianate exterior."

The Alabama Insane Hospital opened in 1861. It was later renamed for its first superintendent, Peter Bryce, who had first begun as a 27-year-old psychiatric pioneer from South Carolina. Bryce had been brought to the attention of the hospital trustees by Dix. He had studied mental-health care in Europe and worked in psychiatric hospitals in New Jersey, as well as his native state of South Carolina. His tenure was marked by absolute discipline among the staff of the hospital. He demanded that patients be given courtesy, kindness and respect at all times. The use of shackles, straitjackets and other restraints was discouraged, and finally abandoned altogether in 1882. Various work programs and other activities were encouraged, including farming, sewing, maintenance and crafts. Between 1872 and the early 1880s, some of the patients wrote and edited their newspaper, called The Meteor. These writings provide a rare inside look at life in a progressive mental institution in the late 19th century. At that time, Bryce's management and commitment to "scientific treatments" was recognized around the country as being in a class of its own.

== Decline ==
During the 20th century, the patient population expanded while standards of care fell to abysmal levels. Alabama Governor Lurleen Wallace viewed the facility in February 1967, and was moved to tears after an overweight, mentally challenged nine-year-old attempted to hug her, crying, "Mama! Mama!" She lobbied her husband, George Wallace (who held the actual power of her governorship) for more funds for the institution.

In 1970, Alabama ranked last among U.S. states in funding for mental health. Bryce Hospital at that time had 5,200 patients living in conditions that a Montgomery Advertiser editor likened to a concentration camp. That same year, a cigarette tax earmarked for mental-health treatment was cut. Ninety nine Bryce employees were laid off, including 20 professional staff. Members of the Department of Psychology at the University of Alabama attempted to file suit on behalf of the laid-off workers, but Federal Judge Frank M. Johnson ruled that the courts had no standing to intervene on behalf of fired employees. He left open, however, the possibility of a suit filed on behalf of patients, whose quality of care was affected.

== Wyatt v. Stickney ==
In 1970, Director Stonewall Stickney was the one who was forced to cut the DMH budget by one percent and to lay off the employees at Bryce Hospital. Ricky Wyatt, a 15-year-old who had always been labeled a "juvenile delinquent" and housed at Bryce despite not being diagnosed with a mental illness, became the named plaintiff in a class-action lawsuit filed on October 23, 1970, by attorneys George Dean and Jack Drake against the Alabama Department of Mental Health. The suit named two classes as plaintiffs: one designating Ricky Wyatt and the Bryce patients and the other consisting of dismissed employees. Wyatt’s aunt, Mildred Hunter Rawlins, was one of the employees who had been laid off. Together they testified about intolerable conditions and improper treatments designed only to make the patients more manageable. Attorneys for the plaintiffs alleged that insufficient staff at the hospital would prevent involuntarily committed mentally ill patients from receiving adequate treatment, a violation of their civil rights under the Fourteenth Amendment of the U.S. Constitution.

In 1971, the plaintiff class was expanded to include patients at Alabama's other inpatient mental health facilities, Searcy Hospital (Mt. Vernon), which from 1902 until 1939 was the only state facility serving African American patients, Partlow State School (Tuscaloosa), and the Jemison Center (Coker), which served African American patients in the northern half of the state from 1939 to 1969.

On April 13, 1972, Federal District Court judge Frank M. Johnson Jr. ruled in favor of the plaintiffs, concluding from evidence submitted during litigation that standards for adequate treatment did not exist. Judge Johnson issued his historic order containing the minimal constitutional treatment standards, later referred to as the Wyatt Standards, for the mentally ill and the developmentally disabled.

Wyatt v. Stickney's resulting court-ordered agreements formed the basis for federal minimum standards for the care of people with mental illness or developmental disabilities who reside in institutional settings. In 1999, a new settlement agreement was made, recognizing a great deal of progress. The case was finally dismissed on December 5, 2003, with the finding by Judge Myron H. Thompson that Alabama complied with the agreement.

The standards elaborated in that agreement have served as a model nationwide. Known as the "Wyatt Standards," they are founded on four criteria for evaluation of care:

- Humane psychological and physical environment
- Qualified and sufficient staff for the administration of treatment
- Individualized treatment plans
- Minimum restriction of patient freedom.

The case of Wyatt v. Stickney concluded after 33 years, the longest mental health case in United States history. The State of Alabama estimates its litigation expenses at over $15 million.

== Future ==
Gov. Bob Riley announced on December 30, 2009, that Bryce Hospital was to relocate into a newly constructed facility across McFarland Boulevard in Tuscaloosa, and The University of Alabama (UA) would take over the current Bryce campus. For several years the university had sought the 180-acre (73 ha) parcel of land, which is adjacent to its landlocked campus.

Riley said that a hospital for about 268 patients had been envisioned but the final size was yet to be determined. The deal, approved by Gov. Bob Riley and the Alabama Department of Mental Health on December 30, 2009, was worth $72 million in cash, including the construction of a replacement hospital, which was done under UA's supervision and direction. The university paid $50 million in cash and Mental Health received another $22 million in state bond money. The university pledged another $10 million to clean up environmental problems on the Bryce grounds and restore the main hospital building, construction of which started in 1853.

The sale of Bryce Hospital and Harper Center to UA was finalized on May 27, 2010, for $87.75 million. $77 million would go to installments plus the aforementioned $10 million for ground improvements. In 2014, the remaining patients were moved to the new Bryce Hospital, constructed on the former Partlow Center grounds, and UA began a restoration project estimated at $40 million. Dan Wolfe, the University of Alabama planner, revealed the two buildings will house a welcome center, two museums focusing on mental health and the history of the university, event space and classrooms for performing arts students. The $83,750,000 project is ongoing.

== Gallery ==
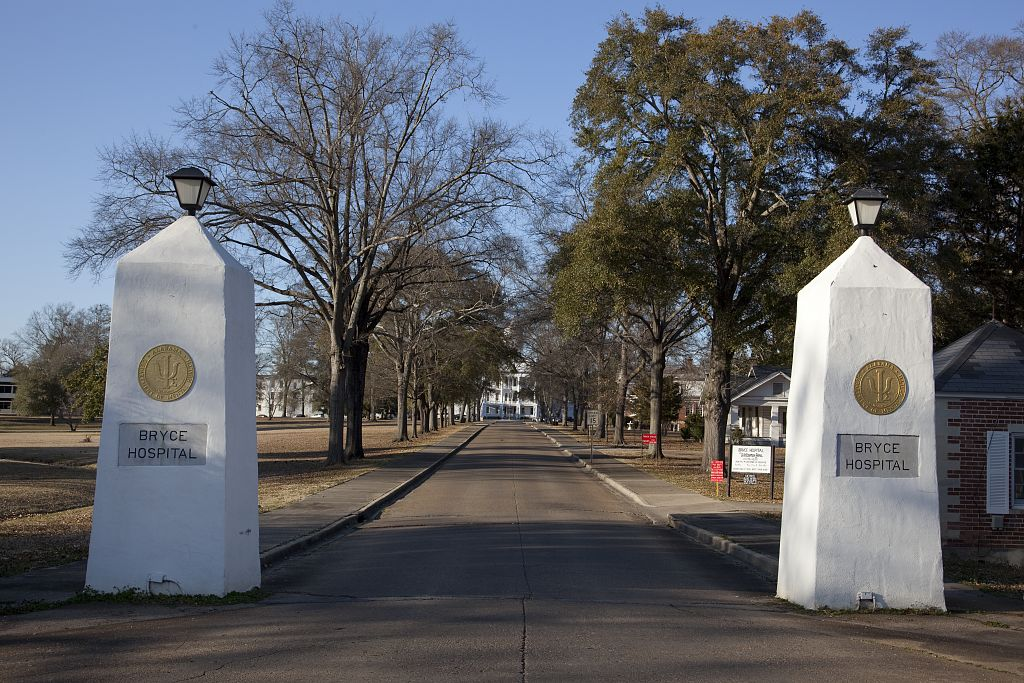
Entrance gate to the campus, now called the Peter Bryce Preserve.

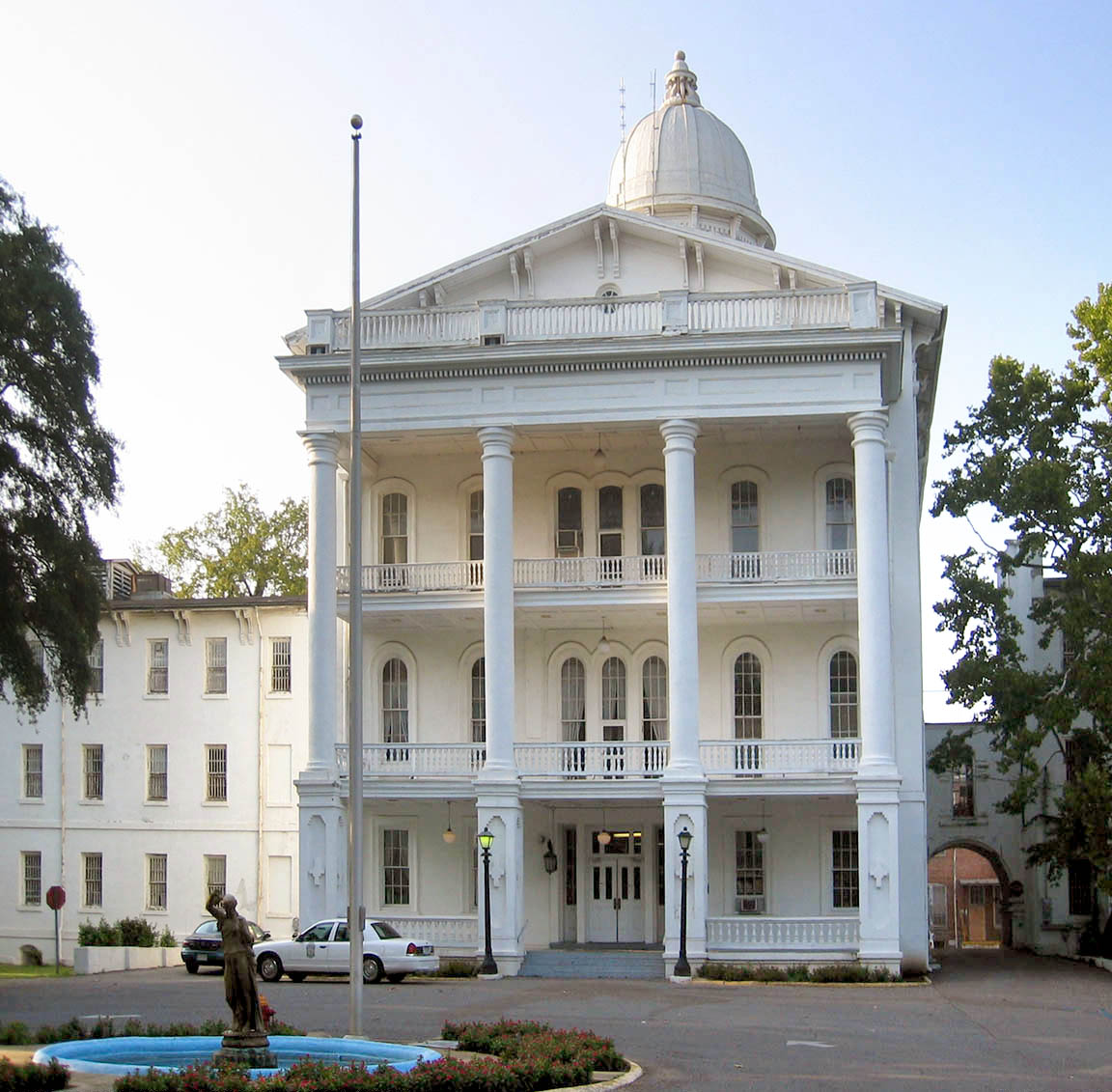
Detail of front portico on the Administration Building, now The University of Alabama Welcome Center.

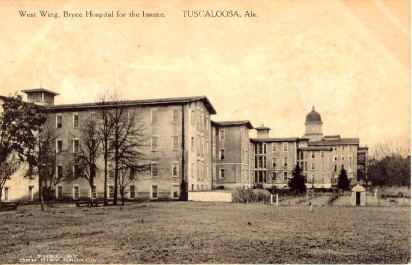
A postcard depicting Bryce Hospital around the turn of the 20th century

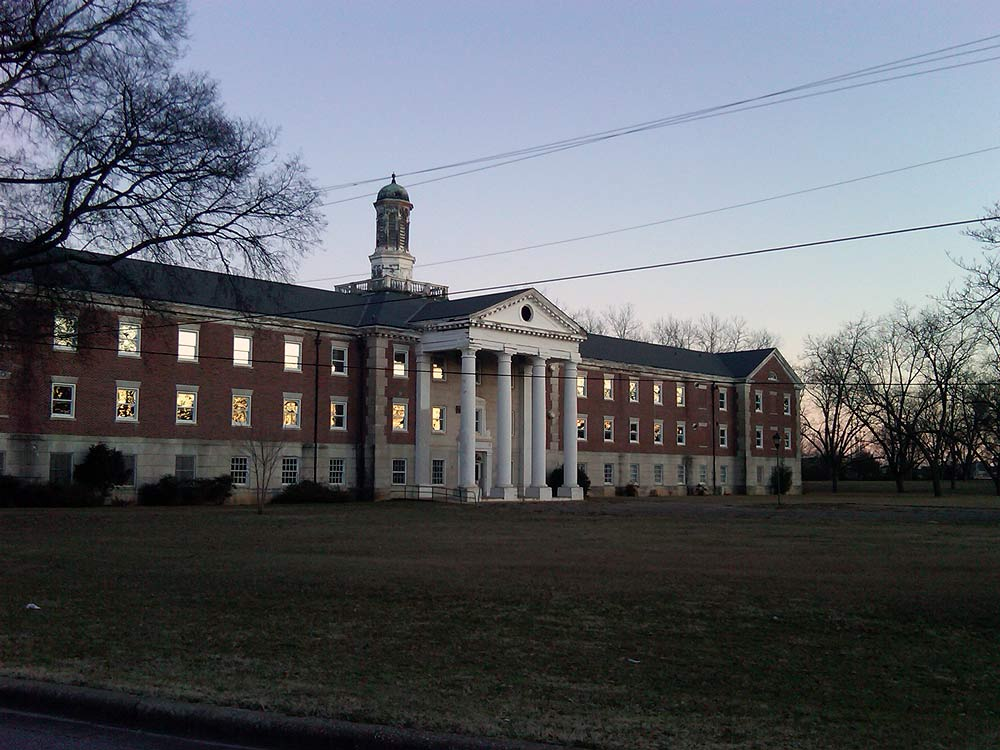
Former Women's Psychiatric Center. Renovated ca. 2017 and rechristened as University Hall.

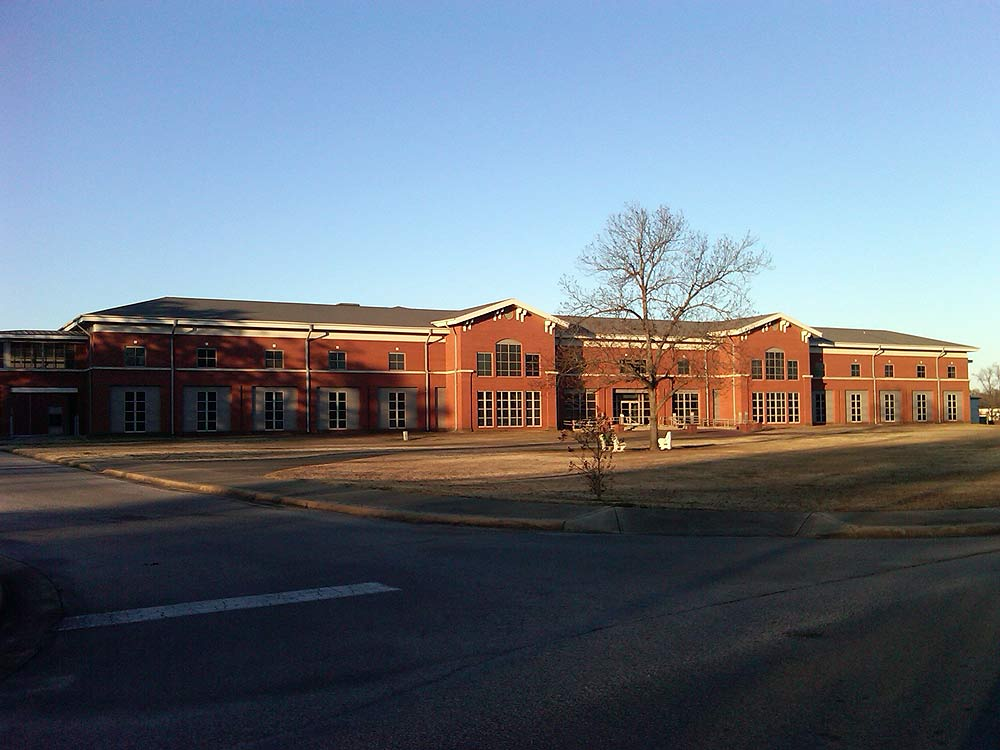
Admission building, where most patients are located

== See also ==
- Alabama Department of Mental Health
- Bazelon Center for Mental Health Law
- The Meteor, an internal paper published by the residents of Bryce Hospital between 1872 and 1881.
