= Alabama Department of Mental Health =

Agency of the U.S. state of Alabama

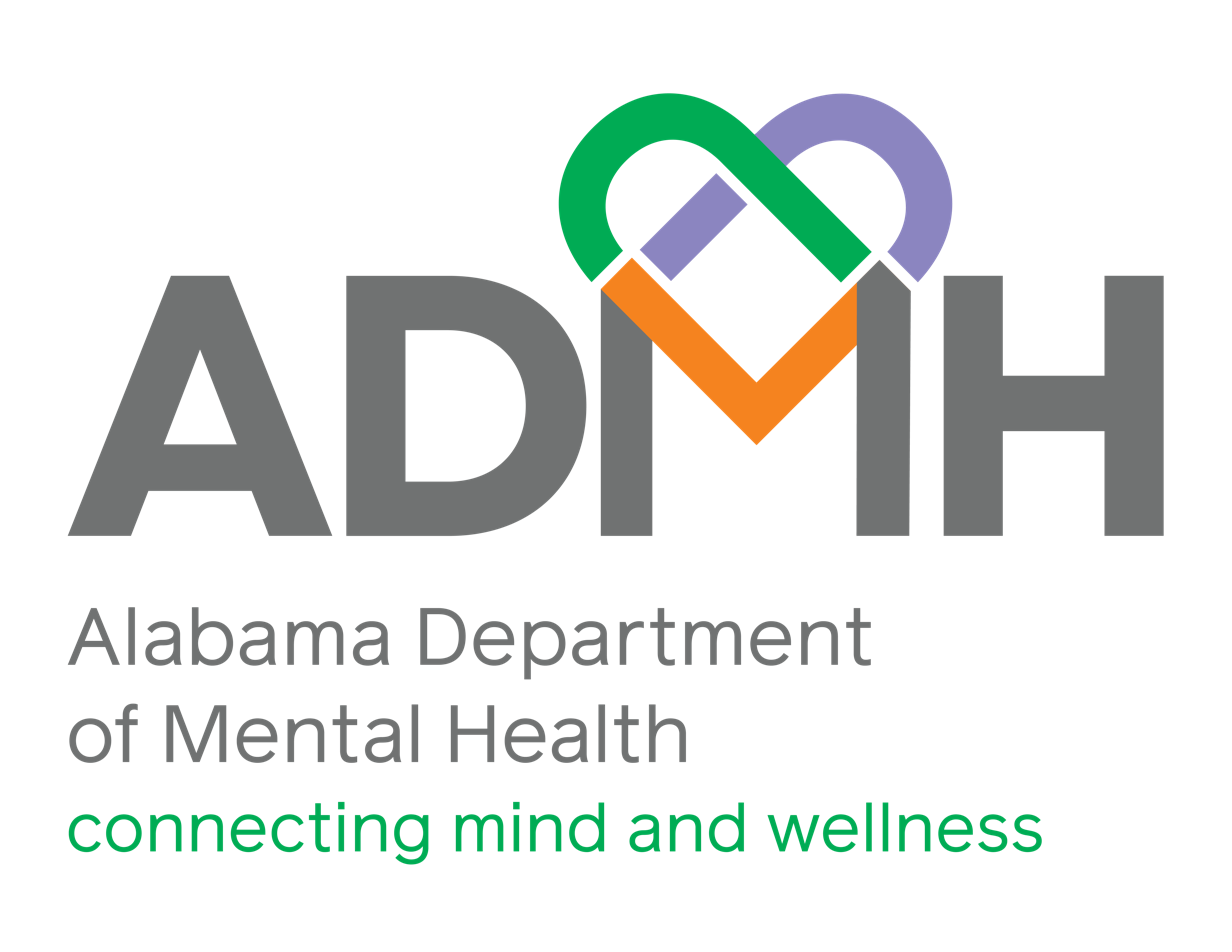
- Logo for the Alabama Department of Mental Health
- Formation: 1965
- Type: Government organization
- Headquarters: 100 North Union Street; Montgomery, Alabama
- Region served: Alabama
- Commissioner: Kimberly Boswell
- Website: www.mh.alabama.gov

Alabama Department of Mental Health is the state agency responsible for serving Alabama citizens with mental illnesses, intellectual disabilities, and substance use disorders. The department was formally established by ACT 881 in 1965.

Annually, ADMH serves every single person in Alabama through a broad network of community mental health services and three state-operated facilities: Bryce Hospital, Mary Starke Harper Geriatric Psychiatry Center, and Taylor Hardin Secure Medical Facility. The ADMH has the office of Deaf Services, directed by Steve Hamerdinger, that aids in providing culturally affirmative services to people who are deaf and hard of hearing.

The central office, located in Montgomery, consists of management and support personnel that facilitate all of the mental health services statewide. Budget management, planning, legal representation, advocacy, consumer empowerment, information technology, and certification are but a few of the functions conducted by the 35 offices and/or bureaus operating in central office. Less than thirteen percent of the 1,300 ADMH employees are housed at central office; included are the Commissioner and staff, as well as the Associate Commissioners for each division. Most ADMH employees are medical and direct care staff that work in facilities.

It was announced on February 15, 2012 that the department would close all but two of its state-run mental health facilities, in a move to transition all but its forensic and geriatric patients to community-based treatment. The closures are expected to be complete by September 2013.

== Facilities ==
- Bryce Hospital

Former facilities include:

- S.D. Allen Nursing Home (closed in 2003)
- A.P. Brewer-Bayside Developmental Center (closed in 2004)
- Eufaula Adolescent Center (closed in 1996)
- Greil Memorial Psychiatric Hospital (closed in 2012)
- Glenn Ireland, II Developmental Center (closed in 1994)
- Alice Kidd Nursing Home (closed in 2009)
- Partlow Center (closed in 2011)
- Searcy Hospital (closed in 2012)
- J.S. Tarwater Developmental Center (closed in 2004)
- Thomasville Mental Health Rehabilitation Center (became a part of Searcy in 2004)
- Lurleen B. Wallace Developmental Center (closed in 2003)

== See also ==
- Government of Alabama
