= California Mental Health Services Act =

California law

California Proposition 63 (2004)

California Legislature
- Long title: Mental Health Services Act (MHSA)
- Citation: Proposition 63 of 2004
- Passed by: Voter approval (53.8% in favor)
- Passed: November 2, 2004
- Enacted: January 2005
- Signed: November 2, 2004
- Introduced by: Voter initiative

Related legislation
- California Proposition 36 (2000) (Substance Abuse and Crime Prevention Act)

Summary
- The MHSA imposes a 1% tax on individuals with income over $1 million to fund mental health services and programs in California, aiming to improve mental health care access and reduce homelessness, while promoting innovative and preventative community-based services.
- Status: Unknown

In November 2004, voters in the U.S. state of California passed Proposition 63, the Mental Health Services Act (MHSA), which has been designed to expand and transform California's county mental health service systems. The MHSA is funded by imposing an additional one percent tax on individual, but not corporate, taxable income in excess of one million dollars. In becoming law in January 2005, the MHSA represents the latest in a Californian legislative movement, begun in the 1990s, to provide better coordinated and more comprehensive care to those with serious mental illness, particularly in underserved populations. Its claim of successes thus far, such as with the development of innovative and integrated Full Service Partnerships (FSPs), are not without detractors who highlight many problems but especially a lack of oversight, large amount of unspent funds, poor transparency, lack of engagement in some communities, and a lack of adherence to required reporting as challenges MHSA implementation must overcome to fulfill the law's widely touted potential.

== Background ==
At one time, California was known for having a strong mental health system. Treatment was available for Medi-Cal recipients with few limitations on care. Legislators and voters have acknowledged the inadequacy of California's historically underfunded mental health system to care for the state's residents, especially those with serious mental illness, over the past few decades. In 1991, to build a more community- and county-based system of care, the California legislature instituted realignment, a delegation of the control over mental health funds and care delivery from state to county. This was followed by a succession of legislation targeted towards marginalized populations with high documented rates of mental illness, such as the homeless (AB 2034, in 1999) and the potentially violent mentally ill (Laura's Law, in 2002). However, with the passage of Proposition 63 in 2004, California voters acted upon a widespread perception that state and county mental health systems were still in disrepair, underfunded, and requiring a systematic, organizational overhaul. This perception echoed a nationwide perspective, with the President's New Freedom Commission on Mental Health in 2003 calling for fundamental transformation of the historically fragmented mental health system. The MHSA is California's attempt to lead the way in accomplishing such systemic reform.

In the end, voter consciences were pricked by the well-organized and -funded campaign that displayed both the need (50,000 mentally ill homeless people, according to the National Alliance on Mental Illness) and the promise (successes of past mental health initiatives) of increased funding for the mental health system. Then-Assemblyman Darrell Steinberg and Rusty Selix, executive director of the Mental Health Association in California, led the initiative by collecting at minimum 373,816 signatures, along with financial ($4.3 million) and vocal support from stakeholders. Though Governor Arnold Schwarzenegger and the business community were opposed to Proposition 63 because of the tax it would impose on millionaires, the opposition raised only $17,500. On November 2, 2004, Proposition 63 passed with 53.8% of the vote, with 6,183,119 voting for and 5,330,052 voting against the bill.

Proposition 63 results by county Yes: 70–80%; 60–70%; 50–60%; No: 60–70%; 50–60%

== Overview ==
The voter-approved MHSA initiative provides for developing, through an extensive stakeholder process, a comprehensive approach to providing community based mental health services and supports for California residents. Approximately 51,000 taxpayers in California will be helping to fund the MHSA through an estimated $750 million in tax revenue during fiscal year 2005–06.

The MHSA was an unprecedented piece of legislation in California for several reasons:

- Its funding source, quantity, and allocation is dedicated for mental health services, including times of budget cuts to many other public programs
- It was intended to engage communities in prioritizing which service elements would be funded.
- It was focused on developing preventive and innovative programs to help transform the mental health care system in California.

To accomplish its objectives, the MHSA applies a specific portion of its funds to each of six system-building components:

- Community program planning and administration (10%)
- Community services and supports (45%)
- Capital (buildings) and information technology (IT) (10%)
- Education and training (human resources) (10%)
- Prevention and early intervention (20%)
- Innovation (5%)

Notably, none of the funds were to be used for programs with existing fund allocations, unless it was for a new element or expansion in those existing programs. At least 51% of the funds have to be spent on community services and support for children and adults with or at risk of developing mental illness.

The MHSA stipulates that the California State Department of Mental Health (DMH) will contract with county mental health departments (plus two cities) to develop and manage the implementation of its provisions. Oversight responsibility for MHSA implementation was handed over to the sixteen member Mental Health Services Oversight and Accountability Commission (MHSOAC) on July 7, 2005, when the commission first met.

The MHSA specifies requirements for service delivery and supports for children, youths, adults and older adults with serious emotional disturbances and/or severe mental illnesses. MHSA funding will be made annually to counties to:

- Define serious mental illness among children, adults and seniors as a condition deserving priority attention, including prevention and early intervention services and medical and supportive care
- Reduce the long-term adverse impact on individuals, families and State and local budgets resulting from untreated serious mental illness
- Expand the kinds of successful, innovative service programs for children, adults and seniors already established in California, including culturally and linguistically competent approaches for underserved population
- Provide State and local funds to adequately meet the needs of all children and adults who can be identified and enrolled in programs under this measure
- Ensure all funds are expended in the most cost-effective manner and services are provided in accordance with recommended best practices, subject to local and State oversight to ensure accountability to taxpayers and to the public

== Implementation ==
Starting from enactment, implementation of the MHSA was intended to take six months; in reality, the process of obtaining stakeholder input for administrative rules extended this period by several months. By August 2005, 12 meetings and 13 conference calls involving stakeholders across the state resulted in the final draft of rules by which counties would submit their three-year plans for approval.

Counties are required to develop their own three-year plan, consistent with the requirements outlined in the act, in order to receive funding under the MHSA. Counties are obliged to collaborate with citizens and stakeholders to develop plans that will accomplish desired results through the meaningful use of time and capabilities, including things such as employment, vocational training, education, and social and community activities. Also required will be annual updates by the counties, along with a public review process. County proposals will be evaluated for their contribution to achieving the following goals:

- Safe and adequate housing, including safe living environments, with family for children and youths
- Reduction in homelessness
- A network of supportive relationships
- Timely access to needed help, including times of crisis
- Reduction in incarceration in jails and juvenile halls
- Reduction in involuntary services, including reduction in institutionalization and out-of-home placements

MHSA specifies three stages of local funding, to fulfill initial plans, three-year plans, and long-term strategies. No services would be funded in the first year of implementation. The DMH approved the first county plan in January 2006. Allocations for each category of funding were planned to be granted annually, based upon detailed plans with prior approval. However, an amendment to the MHSA, AB 100, which passed in March 2011, serves to streamline the DMH approval and feedback process to the counties, ostensibly to relieve the DMH of some of its administrative burden.

== Roles and responsibilities ==
While the county mental health departments are involved in the actual implementation of MHSA programs, the MHSA mandates that several entities support or oversee the counties. These include the State Department of Mental Health (DMH) and the Mental Health Services Oversight and Accountability Commission (MHSOAC).

=== California State Department of Mental Health (DMH) ===
In accordance with realignment, the DMH approves county three-year implementation plans, upon comment from the MHSOAC, and passes programmatic responsibilities to the counties. In the first few months immediately following its passage, the DMH has:

- Obtained federal approvals and Medi-Cal waivers, State authority, additional resources and technical assistance in areas related to implementation
- Established detailed requirements for the content of local three year expenditure plans
- Developed criteria and procedures for reporting of county and state performance outcomes
- Defined requirements for the maintenance of current State and local efforts to protect against supplanting existing programs and their funding streams
- Developed formulas for how funding will be divided or distributed among counties
- Determined how funding will flow to counties and set up the mechanics of distribution
- Established a 16-member Mental Health Services Oversight and Accountability Commission (MHSOAC), composed of elected State officials and Governor appointees, along with procedures for MHSOAC review of county planning efforts and oversight of DMH implementation
- Developed and published regulations and provide preliminary training to all counties on plan development and implementation requirements

The DMH has directed all counties to develop plans incorporating five essential concepts:

- Community collaboration
- Cultural competence
- Client/family-driven mental health system for older adults, adults and transition age youth and family-driven system of care for children and youth
- Wellness focus, which includes the concepts of recovery and resilience
- Integrated service experiences for clients and their families throughout their interactions with the mental health system

The DMH, in assuming and asserting its primacy over MHSA implementation, has dictated requirements for service delivery and supports as follows:

- Full Service Partnership (FSP) Funds - funds to provide necessary services and supports for initial populations
- General System Development Funds - funds to improve services and infrastructure
- Outreach and Engagement Funding - funds for those populations that are currently receiving little or no service

=== Mental Health Services Oversight and Accountability Commission (MHSOAC) ===
The authors of the MHSA created the MHSOAC to reflect the consumer-oriented focus of the law, mandating at least two appointees with severe mental illness, two other family members of individuals with severe mental illness, and various other community representatives. This diverse commission holds the responsibility of approving county implementation plans, helping develop mental illness stigma-relieving strategies, and recommending service delivery improvements to the state on an as-needed basis. Whenever the commission identifies a critical issue related to the performance of a county mental health program, it may refer the issue to the DMH.

The first meeting of the MHSOAC was held July 7, 2005, at which time Proposition 63 author Darrell Steinberg was selected unanimously by fellow commissioners as chairman, without comment or discussion. After accepting the gavel, Steinberg was roundly praised for devising Proposition 63's 'creative financing' scheme. Steinberg then said, "We must focus on the big picture," and stated his priorities with regard to the implementation of the MHSA:

- Prioritize prevention and early intervention, without falling into the trap of fail first service provision,
- Address "the plight of those at risk of falling off the edge," and to
- Advocate for mental health services from his "bully pulpit."

==== MHSOAC commissioners ====
In accordance with MHSA requirements, the Commission shall consist of 16 voting members as follows:

1. The Attorney General or his or her designee
2. The Superintendent of Public Instruction or his or her designee
3. The Chairperson of the Senate Health and Human Services Committee or another member of the Senate selected by the President pro Tempore of the Senate
4. The Chairperson of the Assembly Health Committee or another member of the Assembly selected by the Speaker of the Assembly
5. Twelve appointees of the Governor, who shall seek individuals who have had personal or family experience with mental illness, to include:

- two persons with a severe mental illness
- a family member of an adult or senior with a severe mental illness
- a family member of a child who has or has had a severe mental illness
- a physician specializing in alcohol and drug treatment
- a mental health professional
- a county Sheriff,
- a Superintendent of a school district
- a representative of a labor organization
- a representative of an employer with less than 500 employees
- a representative of an employer with more than 500 employees
- a representative of a health care services plan or insurer

==== State government appointees ====
The initial government officials and designee appointed:

- Senator Wesley Chesbro (Democrat), of Arcata, chair of the Senate Budget and Fiscal Review Committee and the Senate Select Committee on Developmental Disabilities and Mental Health.
- Assemblyman Mark Ridley-Thomas (Dem), of Los Angeles, a member of the Assembly Health committee and former L.A. city councilman.
- Attorney General Bill Lockyer, of Hayward, a former State Senator and Assemblyman.
- Darrell Steinberg (Dem), of Sacramento, an attorney, the author of Proposition 63, former Assemblyman. Steinberg is the appointee of the Superintendent of Public Instruction.

==== Governor's appointees ====
On June 21, 2005, Governor Schwarzenegger announced his appointment of twelve appointees to the MHSOAC:

- MHOAC Vice Chairman Linford Gayle (declined to state party), 46, of Pacifica, a mental health program specialist at San Mateo County Mental Health Services.
- Karen Henry (Republican), 61, of Granite Bay, a labor attorney and a board member of California National Alliance for the Mentally Ill (NAMI). Henry is afflicted by 'rapid cycling' bipolar disorder, has a son who has autism, and another son with a mental illness.
- William Kolender (Rep), 70, of San Diego, the San Diego County Sheriff and president of the State Sheriffs Association, a member of the State Board of Corrections, and was for three years the director of the California Youth Authority (CYA). Kolender's wife died as a result of mental illness, and he has a son with a mental disorder.
- Kelvin Lee, Ed.D. (Rep), 58, of Roseville, a superintendent of the Dry Creek Joint Elementary School District.
- Andrew Poat (Rep), 45, of San Diego, former director of the government relations department for the City of San Diego, a member of the public policy committee for the San Diego Gay and Lesbian Center, and a former deputy director of the United States Office of Consumer Affairs. Poat represented employers of more than 500 workers on the commission, and says he will use his experience building multimillion-dollar programs to bring together mental health advocates.
- Darlene Prettyman (Rep), 71, of Bakersfield, is a psychiatric nurse, a board member and past president of NAMI California, and a past chairman and a member of the California Mental Health Planning Council. Her son has schizophrenia, and her stated priority is to enhance provision of housing for mental health service clients.
- Carmen Diaz (Dem), 53, of Los Angeles, a family advocate coordinator with the L.A. County Department of Mental Health and a board member of United Advocates for Children of California. Diaz has a family member with a severe mental illness.
- F. Jerome Doyle (Dem), 64, of Los Gatos, is chief executive officer of EMQ (a provider of mental health services for children and youth), a board member and past president of the California Council of Community Mental Health Agencies, and a board member of California Mental Health Advocates for Children.
- Saul Feldman DPA, (Dem), 75, of San Francisco, is chairman and CEO of United Behavioral Health, a member of the American Psychological Association, the founder and former president of the American College of Mental Health Administration, and a former president and CEO of Health America Corporation of California. Feldman was appointed as a health care plan insurer.
- Gary Jaeger, M.D. (Dem), 62, of Harbor City, is currently the chief of addiction medicine at Kaiser Foundation Hospital, South Bay, a member and former chair of the Behavioral Health Advisory Board of the California Healthcare Association, and former medical director of family recovery services at St. Joseph Hospital in Eureka. He says members of his family have an "80 percent rate of drug and alcohol abuse."
- Mary Hayashi (Dem), 38, of Castro Valley, president of the Iris Alliance Fund and a board member for Planned Parenthood Golden Gate and member of the Board of Registered Nursing. Hayashi's concerns include transportation access for clients and paratransit services, and represents employers with 500 or fewer workers.
- Patrick Henning (Dem), 32, of West Sacramento, is the legislative advocate for the California Council of Laborers. He was previously the Assistant Secretary at the Labor and Workforce Development Agency (An Agency that he helped create), deputy director for the Department of Industrial Relations and Prior to his State service Special Advisor and Congressional Liaison to President Bill Clinton. Henning is a member of the Career Technical Education Standards and Framework Advisory Group and the California Assembly Speaker's Commission on Labor Education. He represents labor.

== Current progress ==
One unqualified success story from the MHSA thus far involves the implementation of Full Service Partnerships (FSPs) demonstrating the "whatever it takes" commitment to assist in individualized recovery - whether it is housing, "integrated services, flexible funding [such as for childcare], intensive case management, [or] 24 h access to care." FSP interventions are based upon evidence from such programs as Assertive community treatment (ACT), which has effectively reduced homelessness and hospitalizations while bettering outcomes. But the FSP model looks more like that of the also-popular MHA Village in Long Beach, which is a center that offers more comprehensive services besides those specifically mental health-related. Beyond these guiding principles, however, there has not been much consensus over unifying strategies to define and implement an FSP - resulting in varying FSP structures across counties.

Overall, though, the Petris Center, funded by the DMH and California HealthCare Foundation to evaluate the MHSA, has reported quantifiable improvements in many areas:

- Homelessness rates
- Entry rates into the criminal justice system
- Suffering from illness
- Daily functioning
- Education rates
- Employment rates
- General satisfaction with FSPs

== Continued challenges ==
According to the UCLA Center for Health Policy Research, the 2007 and 2009 California Health Interview Surveys (CHIS) demonstrate continued mental health needs of almost two million Californians, about half of which were unmet in 2011. In spite of steady tax revenue ($7.4 billion raised as of September 2011) earmarked for the MHSA, the unremittingly high numbers of mentally ill who lack treatment contrast starkly with the implementation of new programs like the FSPs, which may cost tens of thousands of dollars annually per person. The MHA Village program, for example, averages around $18,000 annually per person. One of the major growing concerns regarding MHSA implementation is its unintentional but worrying tendency to create silos of care. As directed by the DMH, counties search for "unserved" mentally ill or at-risk individuals to enroll in their new programs, while keeping existing and perhaps underserved clients in old programs that are usually underfunded, but cannot take MHSA funds. Ironically, while the MHSA was established in part to address racial/ethnic disparities in health care, it may be perpetuating the disparity in services delivery between underfunded and well-funded, new programs.

A possible solution to this issue highlights another challenge for the MHSA: the need for more comprehensive evaluation, oversight, and advisory mechanisms. Though there is an accountability commission, the MHSOAC, its oversight and regulatory responsibilities are not well-defined. However, it is a relatively new entity, having been created by the MHSA in 2004, and has yet to fully delineate its role in the MHSA. With time, the MHSOAC will hopefully continue to develop towards its stated function. Objective and expert evaluation of the MHSA will also be necessary to achieve the kind of longstanding system-wide improvement that then becomes a model for others.

== See also ==
- Care in the Community
- Chemical imbalance theory
- History of mental illness
- Lanterman-Petris-Short Act
- MindFreedom International
- New Freedom Commission on Mental Health
- Outpatient commitment
- Psychiatric hospital
- Psychiatric survivors movement
- Texas Medication Algorithm Project
- The Village ISA (award-winning recovery program)
- Whitehall Study
- Mental Health Association of San Francisco
