= Community mental health service =

Treatment of mental disorders in homes over asylums

Community mental health services, also known as community mental health teams in the United Kingdom, support or treat people with mental disorders (mental illness or mental health difficulties) in a domiciliary setting, instead of a psychiatric hospital (asylum). The array of community mental health services vary depending on the country in which the services are provided. It refers to a system of care in which the patient's community, not a specific facility such as a hospital, is the primary provider of care for people with a mental illness. The goal of community mental health services often includes much more than simply providing outpatient psychiatric treatment.

Community services include supported housing with full or partial supervision (including halfway houses), psychiatric wards of general hospitals (including partial hospitalization), local primary care medical services, day centers or clubhouses, community mental health centers, and self-help groups for mental health.

The services may be provided by government organizations and mental health professionals, including specialized teams providing services across a geographical area, such as assertive community treatment and early psychosis teams. They may also be provided by private or charitable organizations. They may be based on peer support and the consumer/survivor/ex-patient movement.

The World Health Organization states that community mental health services are more accessible and effective, lessen social exclusion, and are likely to have fewer possibilities for the neglect and violations of human rights that were often encountered in mental hospitals. However, WHO notes that in many countries, the closing of mental hospitals has not been accompanied by the development of community services, leaving a service vacuum with far too many not receiving any care.

New legal powers have developed in some countries, such as the United States, to supervise and ensure compliance with treatment of individuals living in the community, known as outpatient commitment or assisted outpatient treatment or community treatment orders.

== History ==
=== Origins ===
Community mental health services began as an effort to contain those who were "mad" or considered "lunatics". Understanding the history of mental disorders is crucial in understanding the development of community mental health services. As medical psychology developed as a science and shifted toward the treatment of the mentally ill, psychiatric institutions began to develop around the world, and laid the groundwork for modern day community mental health services.

=== Pre-deinstitutionalization ===
On 3 July 1946, President Harry Truman signed the National Mental Health Act which, for the first time in the history of the United States, generated a large amount of federal funding for both psychiatric education and research. The passing of this Act eventually led to the founding of the National Institute of Mental Health (NIMH) in 1949. At the end of the 1940s and moving into the beginning of the 1950s, the governor of Minnesota Luther Youngdahl initiated the development of numerous community-based mental health services. He also advocated for the humane treatment of people in state institutions.

=== Deinstitutionalization ===
Philippe Pinel played a large role in the ethical and humane treatment of patients and greatly influenced Dorothea Dix. Dix advocated the expansion of state psychiatric hospitals for patients who were at the time being housed in jails and poor houses. Despite her good intentions, rapid urbanization and increased immigration led to a gross overwhelming of the state's mental health systems and because of this, as the 19th century ended and the 20th century began, a shift in focus from treatment to custodial care was seen. As quality of care declined and psychotropic drugs were introduced, those with mental illnesses were reintroduced to the community, where community mental health services were designated as primary care providers.

=== Mental health movements ===
Reform movement	Era	Setting	Focus of reform
Moral Treatment	1800–1850	Asylum	Humane, restorative treatment
Mental Hygiene	1890–1920	Mental hospital or clinic	Prevention, scientific orientation
Community Mental Health	1955–1970	Community mental health center	Deinstitutionalization, social integration
Community Support	1975–present	Communities	Mental illness as a social welfare problem (e.g. treatment housing, employment)

=== Post-deinstitutionalization ===
In the United States, following deinstitutionalization, many mentally ill people were released into communities with inadequate care, leading to an increase in incarceration, homelessness and an influx into community care facilities. Low-income and marginalized communities were disproportionately impacted. Specifically, racial and ethnic minorities faced increased obstacles to care.It was at this point in history that modern community mental health services started to grow and become influential. In 1955, following a major period of deinstitutionalization, the Mental Health Study Act was passed. With the passing of this Act, the U.S. Congress called for "an objective, thorough, nationwide analysis and reevaluation of the human and economic problems of mental health." Following Congress' mandate, the Joint Commission on Mental Illness conducted studies, resulting in recommendations to establish community mental health care centers across the country. In 1963 the Community Mental Health Centers Act was passed, essentially kick-starting the community mental health revolution. This Act contributed further to deinstitutionalization by moving mental patients into their "least restrictive" environments. The Community Mental Health Centers Act funded three main initiatives:

1. Professional training for those working in community mental health centers
2. Improvement of research in the methodology utilized by community mental health centers
3. Improving the quality of care of existing programs until newer community mental health centers could be developed.

The Mental Health Act of 1963 aimed to implement these three initiatives to expand access for some of the most vulnerable members of the community. Despite its well-intentioned reform, the transition from institutions to community health centers was severely underfunded, leaving community centers unable to meet the growing service demands. During the rapid defunding of large psychiatric facilities, there was no redistribution of federal resources to community health centers. The lack of reinvestment by states during deinstitutionalization led to underfunded centers with inadequate services to support the needs of the community. Additionally, the community health centers and institutions were given unclear instructions on how to navigate continuity of patient care. Specifically, the protocols given to community health centers after deinstitutionalization did not recognize the need for coordinated referral systems, discharge planning, and continuity and alignment of care, which are all essential in the delivery of competent mental health care. With mass institutional closures, many patients were not referred to new health centers, and instead, left without consistent psychiatric care, leading to growing numbers of homeless and incarcerated individuals living with mental illness.

That same year, the Mental Retardation Facilities and Community Mental Health Centers Construction Act was passed. President John F. Kennedy focused his campaign platform on strongly supporting community mental health in the United States. KKennedy's ultimate goal was to reduce the custodial care of mental health patients by 50% in ten to twenty years. In 1965, the Community Mental Health Act was amended to ensure a long list of provisions. First, construction and staffing grants were extended to include centers that served patients with substance abuse disorders. Secondly, grants were provided to bolster the initiation and progression of community mental health services in low-SES areas. Lastly, new grants were established to support mental health services aimed at helping children. As the 20th century progressed, even more political influence was exerted on community mental health. In 1965, with the passing of Medicare and Medicaid, there was an intense growth of skilled nursing homes and intermediate-care facilities that alleviated the burden felt by the large-scale public psychiatric hospitals.

=== 20th century ===
From 1965 to 1969, $260 million was authorized for community mental health centers. Compared to other government organizations and programs, this number is strikingly low. The funding drops even further under Richard Nixon from 1970 to 1973 with a total of $50.3 million authorized. Even though the funding for community mental health centers was on a steady decline, deinstitutionalization continued into the 1960s and 1970s. The number of state and county mental hospital resident patients in 1950 was 512,501 and by 1989 had decreased to 101,402. This continuing process of deinstitutionalization without adequate alternative resources led the mentally ill into homelessness, jails, and self-medication through the use of drugs or alcohol. In 1975 Congress passed an Act requiring community mental health centers to provide aftercare services to all patients in the hopes of improving recovery rates. In 1980, just five years later, Congress passed the Mental Health Systems Act of 1980, which provided federal funding for ongoing support and development of community mental health programs. This Act strengthened the connection between federal, state, and local governments with regards to funding for community mental health services. It was the final result of a long series of recommendations by Jimmy Carter's Mental Health Commission. Despite this apparent progress, just a year after the Mental Health Systems Act was passed, the Omnibus Budget Reconciliation Act of 1981 was passed. The Omnibus Act was passed by the efforts of the Reagan administration as an effort to reduce domestic spending. The Act rescinded a large amount of the legislation just passed, and the legislation that was not rescinded was almost entirely revamped. It effectively ended federal funding of community treatment for the mentally ill, shifting the burden entirely to individual state governments. Federal funding was now replaced by granting smaller amounts of money to the individual states. In 1977, the National Institute of Mental Health (NIMH) initiated its Community Support Program (C.S.P.). The C.S.P.'s goal was to shift the focus from psychiatric institutions and the services they offer to networks of support for individual clients. The C.S.P. established the ten elements of a community support system listed below:

1. Responsible team
2. Residential care
3. Emergency care
4. Medicare care
5. Halfway house
6. Supervised (supported) apartments
7. Outpatient therapy
8. Vocational training and opportunities
9. Social and recreational opportunities
10. Family and network attention

This conceptualization of what makes a good community program has come to serve as a theoretical guideline for community mental health service development throughout the modern-day United States psychological community. In 1986 Congress passed the Mental Health Planning Act of 1986, which was a Federal law requiring that at the state government level, all states must have plans for establishing case management under Medicaid, improving mental health coverage of community mental health services, adding rehabilitative services, and expanding clinical services to the homeless population. More specifically, community mental health providers could now receive reimbursement for services from Medicare and Medicaid, which allowed for many of the centers to expand their range of treatment options and services. As the 1990s began, many positive changes occurred for people with mental illnesses through the development of larger networks of community-based providers and added innovations with regards to payment options from Medicare and Medicaid. Despite these advancements, there were many issues associated with the increasing cost of health care. Community mental health services moved toward a system more similar to managed care as the 1990s progressed. Managed care as a system focuses on limiting costs by one of two means: either keeping the total number of patients using services low or reducing the cost of the service itself. Despite the drive for community mental health, many physicians, mental health specialists, and even patients have come to question its effectiveness as a treatment. The underlying assumptions of community mental health require that patients who are treated within a community have a place to live, a caring family, or supportive social circle that does not inhibit their rehabilitation. These assumptions are in fact often wrong. Many people with mental illnesses, upon discharge, have no family to return to and end up homeless. While there is much to be said for the benefits that community mental health offers, many communities as a whole often harbor negative attitudes toward those with mental illnesses. Historically, people with mental illnesses have been portrayed as violent or criminal and because of this, "many American jails have become housing for persons with severe mental illnesses arrested for various crimes." In 1999 the Supreme Court ruled on the case Olmstead v. L.C. The Court ruled that it was a violation of the Americans with Disabilities Act of 1990 to keep an individual in a more restrictive inpatient setting, such as a hospital, when a more appropriate and less restrictive community service was available to the individual.

=== 21st century and modern trends ===
In 2002 President George W. Bush increased funding for community health centers. The funding aided in the construction of additional centers and increased the number of services offered at these centers, which included healthcare benefits. In 2003, the New Freedom Commission on Mental Health, established by President Bush, issued a report. The report was in place to "conduct a comprehensive study of the United States mental health delivery system..." Its objectives included assessing the efficiency and quality of both public and private mental health providers and identifying possible new technologies that could aid in treatment. As the 20th century came to a close and the 21st century began, the number of patients diagnosed with a mental health or substance abuse disorder receiving services at community mental health centers grew from 210,000 to approximately 800,000. This nearly four-fold increase shows just how important community mental health centers are becoming to the general population's wellbeing. This drastic rise in the number of patients was not mirrored by a concomitant rise in the number of clinicians serving this population. The staggering new numbers of patients then are being forced to seek specialized treatment from their primary care providers or hospital emergency rooms. The result of this trend is that a patient who is working with a primary care provider is more likely to receive less care than with a specialized clinician. Politics and funding have always been and continue to be a topic of contention when it comes to funding of community health centers. Political views aside, it is clear that these community mental health centers exist largely to aid areas painfully under resourced with psychiatric care. In 2008, over 17 million people utilized community mental health centers with 35% being insured through Medicaid, and 38% being uninsured. Networks like Open Path Collective, established in 2015, offer discounted rates to uninsured and underinsured people who cannot otherwise afford psychotherapy. As the 2000s continued, the rate of increase of patients receiving mental health treatment in community mental health centers stayed steady.

=== Purpose and examples ===
Cultural knowledge and attitude is passed from generation to generation. For example, the stigma with therapy may be passed from mother to daughter. San Diego county has a diverse range of ethnicities. Thus, the population diversity in San Diego include many groups with historical trauma and trans-generational trauma within those populations. For example, witnesses of war can pass down certain actions and patterns of survival mechanism to generations. Refugee groups have trans-generational trauma around war and PTSD. Providing services and therapy to these communities is important because it affects their day-to-day lives, where their experiences lead to trauma or the experiences are traumatic themselves. Knowledge and access to mental health resources are limited in these multicultural communities. Government agencies fund community groups that provide services to these communities. Therefore, this creates a power hierarchy. If their missions do not align with each other, it will be hard to provide benefits for the community, even though the services are imperative to the wellbeing of its residents.

The combination of a mental illness as a clinical diagnosis, functional impairment with one or more major life activities, and distress is highest in ages 18–25 years old. Despite the research showing the necessity of therapy for this age group, only one fifth of emerging adults receive treatment. Psychosocial interventions that encourage self-exploration and self-awareness, such as acceptance and mindfulness-based therapies, is useful in preventing and treating mental health concerns. At the Center for Community Counseling and Engagement, 39% of their clients are ages 1–25 years old and 40% are in ages 26–40 years old as well as historically underrepresented people of color. The center serves a wide range of ethnicities and socio-economic statuses in the City Heights community with counselors who are graduate student therapists getting their Master's in Marriage and Family Therapy or Community Counseling from San Diego State University, as well as post-graduate interns with their master's degree, who are preparing to be licensed by the state of California. Counseling fees are based on household incomes, which 69% of the client's annual income is $1–$25,000 essentially meeting the community's needs. Taking into account of San Diego's population, the clinic serves as an example of how resources can be helpful for multicultural communities that have a lot of trauma in their populations.

== See also ==
- American Association of Community Psychiatrists
- Community health
- Recovery model
