= David Shaffer =

Physician and pediatrician (1936–2023)

David Shaffer FRCP
- Born: April 20, 1936; Johannesburg, South Africa
- Died: October 15, 2023 (aged 87); Mastic Beach, New York, U.S.
- Citizenship: South Africa; United Kingdom; United States
- Education: University College London
- Spouses: Serena Millington (div. 1983) Anna Wintour (m. 1984; div. 1999)
- Children: 4
- Relatives: Francesco Carrozzini (son-in-law)
- Scientific career
- Fields: Pediatric psychiatry
- Workplaces: Columbia University Vagelos College of Physicians and Surgeons; New York–Presbyterian Hospital; New York State Psychiatric Institute

David Shaffer (April 20, 1936 – October 15, 2023) was a physician and pediatrician. He was the Irving Philips Professor of Child Psychiatry in the Departments of Psychiatry and Pediatrics, at Columbia University's College of Physicians and Surgeons in New York City, now the Columbia University Vagelos College of Physicians and Surgeons. Shaffer was also the chief of pediatric psychiatry at New York–Presbyterian Hospital and chief of the Division of Child and Adolescent Psychiatry, New York State Psychiatric Institute. He was the former spouse of British-American journalist Anna Wintour.

== Training ==
Shaffer was born in Johannesburg, South Africa, on April 20, 1936, In the late 1940s and early 1950s he attended the International School of Geneva as a boarder, since his father did not want him to be educated in the racist society of South Africa.

== Study of suicide ==
At the Maudsley, Shaffer conducted the first epidemiological study of child and early adolescent suicide using the psychological autopsy method. He found that there was a short delay between experiencing a stressor and the act of suicide, youth tended to show elevated levels of aggressive behavior prior to committing suicide, and imitation appeared to play a role in youth suicide. These findings would later be confirmed in his much larger controlled study in New York City and the surrounding area. Other important findings from the New York study included the very high prevalence of alcohol and substance abuse in older male teens who committed suicide and the occurrence of a prior suicide attempt as a predictor of suicide in males, but not females. In females, major depression was especially important predictor of suicide.

The finding of specific profiles and the almost universal presence of treatable psychiatric disorders among suicide victims suggested that case-finding would be a viable method for preventing suicide. However, one approach to case-finding, suicide-awareness educational programs, was found to offer few benefits and potentially increased risk. This stimulated the development of a screening strategy instead. Ultimately, Shaffer led a team of colleagues in creating the Columbia TeenScreen. The scoring algorithm had a sensitivity of 0.75, specificity 0.83, and positive predictive value 16% with suicidal ideation as the criterion.

Other research interests included the development of diagnostic instruments. He was charged by the National Institutes of Health (NIMH) to develop a child version of the Diagnostic Interview Schedule (DIS) for use in large field studies. The NIMH DISC "is a highly structured diagnostic interview, designed to assess more than 30 psychiatric disorders occurring in children and adolescents, and can be administered by "lay" interviewers after a minimal training period." Shaffer led the development of several editions of the DISC, including the version (NIMH DISC-IV), which is based closely on DSM-IV.

== Other research ==
Building on data collected as part of the Columbia Presbyterian Hospital chapter of the multi-center Collaborative Perinatal Project, Shaffer led a study of the sequelae of age-7 neurological soft signs. In that study, Shaffer and his colleagues found that neurological soft signs diagnosed at age 7 were related to mood and anxiety disorders ten years later.

== Later years ==
Shaffer retired as director of the Division of Child and Adolescent Psychiatry at the New York State Psychiatric Institute (NYSPI)/Columbia University (CU) in May 2008.

== Personal life and death ==
Shaffer was married and divorced twice. His first wife was the caterer Serena Bass, by whom he had two sons. They divorced in 1983. His second wife, by whom he had a daughter and a son, was Vogue editor-in-chief Anna Wintour.

David Shaffer died from respiratory failure in Mastic Beach, New York, on October 15, 2023, at the age of 87. He also had Alzheimer’s disease in his later years.

== Publications ==
- Shaffer, D; Gould, MS; Brasic, J; Ambrosini, P; Fisher, P; Bird, H; Aluwahlia, S (1983). "A children's global assessment scale (CGAS)". Arch. Gen. Psychiatry. 40: 1228–31. PMID 6639293..
- Shaffer, D; Gould, MS; Brasic, J; Ambrosini, P; Fisher, P; Bird, H; Aluwahlia, S (1985). "A children's global assessment scale (CGAS) (for children 4 to 16 years of age)". Psychopharmacol Bull. 1 (4): 747–748.
