= MHSA =

MHSA may refer to

- California Mental Health Services Act, legislation designed to expand and transform California's county mental health service systems
- Main Hoon Shahid Afridi, a 2013 Pakistani sports action-drama film
- Milwaukee High School of the Arts, a high school in Milwaukee, Wisconsin
- Montana High School Association, the governing body of high school athletics in the state of Montana
