= History of mental disorders =

Historically, mental disorders have had three major explanations, namely, the supernatural, biological and psychological models. For much of recorded history, deviant behavior has been considered supernatural and a reflection of the battle between good and evil. When confronted with unexplainable, irrational behavior and by suffering and upheaval, people have perceived evil. Physical causes of mental disorders have been sought in history. Hippocrates was important in this tradition as he identified syphilis as a disease and was, therefore, an early proponent of the idea that psychological disorders are biologically caused. This was a precursor to modern psycho-social treatment approaches to the causation of psychopathology, with the focus on psychological, social and cultural factors. Philosophers like Plato, Aristotle, and others wrote about the importance of fantasies, dreams, and thus anticipated, to some extent, the fields of psychoanalytic thought and cognitive science that were later developed. They were also some of the first to advocate for humane and responsible care for individuals with psychological disturbances.

== Ancient period ==
There is archaeological evidence for the use of trepanation in around 6500 BC, though it is unknown if this was done as a response to mental illnesses, or to treat physiological conditions such as cranial hemorrhaging.

=== Mesopotamia ===
Mental illnesses were well known in ancient Mesopotamia, where diseases and mental disorders were believed to be caused by specific deities. Because hands symbolized control over a person, mental illnesses were known as "hands" of certain deities. One psychological illness was known as Qāt Ištar, meaning "Hand of Ishtar". Others were known as "Hand of Shamash", "Hand of the Ghost", and "Hand of the God". Descriptions of these illnesses, however, are so vague that it is usually impossible to determine which illnesses they correspond to in modern terminology. Mesopotamian doctors kept detailed record of their patients' hallucinations and assigned spiritual meanings to them. A patient who hallucinated that he was seeing a dog was predicted to die; whereas, if he saw a gazelle, he would recover. The royal family of Elam was notorious for its members frequently being insane. Erectile dysfunction was recognized as being rooted in psychological problems.

=== Egypt ===
Limited notes in an ancient Egyptian document known as the Ebers papyrus appear to describe the affected states of concentration, attention, and emotional distress in the heart or mind. Some of these were interpreted later, and renamed as hysteria and melancholy. Somatic treatments included applying bodily fluids while reciting magical spells. Hallucinogens may have been used as a part of the healing rituals. Religious temples may have been used as therapeutic retreats, possibly for the induction of receptive states to facilitate sleep and the interpretation of dreams.

=== India ===
Ancient Hindu scriptures-Ramayana and Mahabharata-contain fictional descriptions of depression and anxiety. Mental disorders were generally thought to reflect abstract metaphysical entities, supernatural agents, sorcery and witchcraft. The Charaka Samhita which is a part of the Hindu Ayurveda ("knowledge of life"), saw ill health as resulting from an imbalance among the three body fluids or forces called Tri-Dosha. These also affected the personality types among people. Suggested causes included inappropriate diet, disrespect towards the gods, teachers or others, mental shock due to excessive fear or joy, and faulty bodily activity. Treatments included the use of herbs and ointments, charms and prayers, and moral or emotional persuasion. In the Hindu epic Ramayana, the Dasharatha died from despondency, which Shiv Gautam states illustrates major depressive disorder.

=== China ===
The earliest known record of mental illness in ancient China dates back to 1100 B.C. Mental disorders were treated mainly under Traditional Chinese medicine using herbs, acupuncture or "emotional therapy". The Inner Canon of the Yellow Emperor described symptoms, mechanisms and therapies for mental illness, emphasizing connections between bodily organs and emotions. The ancient Chinese believed that demonic possession played a role in mental illness during this time period. They felt that areas of emotional outbursts, such as funeral homes, could open up the Wei Chi and allow entities to possess an individual. Trauma was also considered to be something that caused high levels of emotion. Thus, trauma is a possible catalyst for mental illness due to its ability to allow the Wei Chi open to possession. This explains why the ancient Chinese believed that a mental illness was, in reality, a demonic possession. According to Chinese thought, five stages or elements comprised the conditions of imbalance between yin and yang. Mental illness, according to the Chinese perspective, is thus considered an imbalance of the yin and yang because optimum health arises from balance with nature.

China was one of the earliest developed civilizations in which medicine and attention to mental disorders were introduced (Soong, 2006). As in the West, Chinese views of mental disorders regressed to a belief in supernatural forces as causal agents. From the later part of the second century through the early part of the ninth century, ghosts and devils were implicated in "ghostevil" insanity, which presumably resulted from possession by evil spirits. The "Dark Ages" in China, however, were neither so severe (in terms of the treatment of mental patients) nor as long-lasting as in the West. A return to biological, somatic (bodily) views and an emphasis on psychosocial factors occurred in the centuries that followed. In recent history, China has been experiencing a broadening of ideas in mental health services and has been incorporating many ideas from Western psychiatry (Zhang & Lu, 2006).

=== Greece and Rome ===
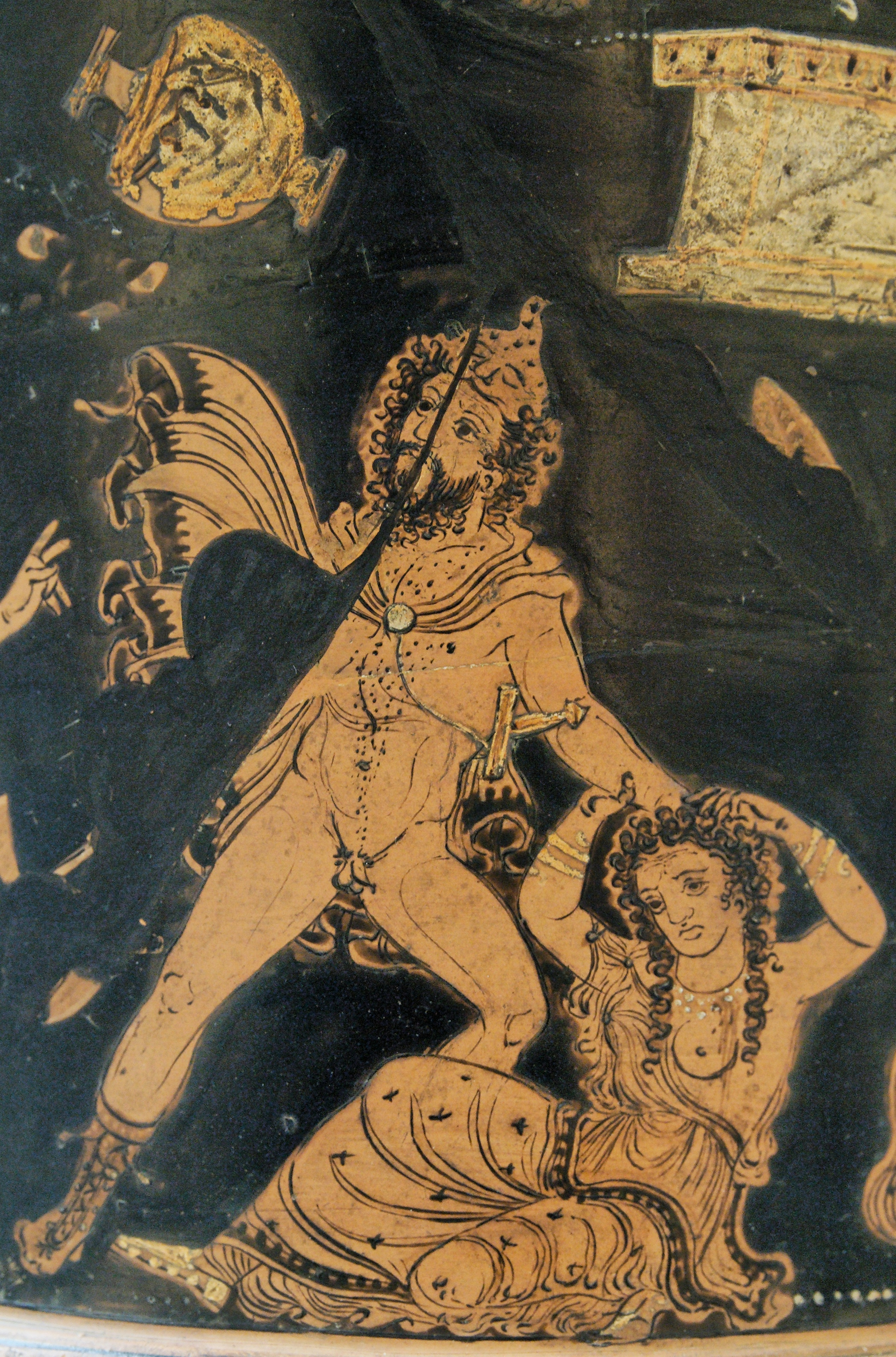
Lycurgus, driven mad by Dionysus, attacks his wife.

In ancient Greece and Rome, madness was associated stereotypically with aimless wandering and violence. However, Socrates considered positive aspects including prophesying (a 'manic art'); mystical initiations and rituals; poetic inspiration; and the madness of lovers. Now often seen as the very epitome of rational thought and as the founder of philosophy, Socrates freely admitted to experiencing what are now called "command hallucinations" (then called his 'daemon'). Pythagoras also heard voices. Hippocrates (470–c. 360 BC) classified mental disorders, including paranoia, epilepsy, mania and melancholia. Hippocrates mentions the practice of bloodletting in the fifth century BC.

Through long contact with Greek culture, and their eventual conquest of Greece, the Romans absorbed many Greek (and other) ideas on medicine. The humoral theory fell out of favor in some quarters. The Greek physician Asclepiades (c. 124–40 BC), who practiced in Rome, discarded it and advocated humane treatments, and had insane persons freed from confinement and treated them with natural therapy, such as diet and massages. Arateus (c. 30–90 AD) argued that it is hard to pinpoint from where a mental illness comes. However, Galen (129–c. 200 AD), practicing in Greece and Rome, revived humoral theory. Galen, however, adopted a single symptom approach rather than broad diagnostic categories, for example studying separate states of sadness, excitement, confusion and memory loss.

Playwrights such as Homer, Sophocles and Euripides described madmen driven insane by the gods, imbalanced humors or circumstances. As well as the triad (of which mania was often used as an overarching term for insanity) there were a variable and overlapping range of terms for such things as delusion, eccentricity, frenzy, and lunacy. Roman encyclopedist Celsus argued that insanity is really present when a continuous dementia begins due to the mind being at the mercy of imaginings. He suggested that people must heal their own souls through philosophy and personal strength. He described common practices of dietetics, bloodletting, drugs, talking therapy, incubation in temples, exorcism, incantations and amulets, as well as restraints and "tortures" to restore rationality, including starvation, being terrified suddenly, agitation of the spirit, and stoning and beating. Most, however, did not receive medical treatment but stayed with family or wandered the streets, vulnerable to assault and derision. Accounts of delusions from the time included people who thought themselves to be famous actors or speakers, animals, inanimate objects, or one of the gods.

=== Israel and the Hebrew diaspora ===
Passages of the Hebrew Bible/Old Testament have been interpreted as describing mood disorders in figures such as Job, King Saul and in the Psalms of David. Mental disorder was not a problem like any other, caused by one of the gods, but rather caused by problems in the relationship between the individual and God. They believed that abnormal behavior was the result of possessions that represented the wrath and punishment from God. This punishment was seen as a withdrawal of God's protection and the abandonment of the individual to evil forces.

From the beginning of the twentieth century, the mental health of Jesus is also discussed.

== Middle Ages ==
=== Middle East ===
Persian and Arabic scholars were heavily involved in translating, analyzing and synthesizing Greek texts and concepts. As the Muslim world expanded, Greek concepts were integrated with religious thought and over time, new ideas and concepts were developed. Arab texts from this period contain discussions of melancholia, mania, hallucinations, delusions, and other mental disorders. Mental disorder was generally connected to loss of reason, and writings covered links between the brain and disorders, and spiritual/mystical meaning of disorders. wrote about fear and anxiety, anger and aggression, sadness and depression, and obsessions.

Authors who wrote on mental disorders and/or proposed treatments during this period include Al-Balkhi, Al-Razi, Al-Farabi, Ibn-Sina, Al-Majusi Abu al-Qasim al-Zahrawi, Averroes, and Najab ud-din Unhammad.

Some thought mental disorder could be caused by possession by a djinn (devil), which could be either good or demon-like. There were sometimes beatings to exorcise the djin, or alternatively over-zealous attempts at cures. Islamic views often merged with local traditions. In Morocco the traditional Berber people were animists and the concept of sorcery was integral to the understanding of mental disorder; it was mixed with the Islamic concepts of djin and often treated by religious scholars combining the roles of holy man, sage, seer and sorcerer.

The first bimaristan was founded in Baghdad in the 9th century, and several others of increasing complexity were created throughout the Arab world in the following centuries. Some of them contained wards dedicated to the care of mentally ill patients, most of whom had debilitating illnesses or exhibited violence. In the centuries to come, the Muslim world would eventually serve as a critical way station of knowledge for Renaissance Europe, through the Latin translations of many scientific Islamic texts. Ibn-Sina's (Avicenna's) Canon of Medicine became the standard of medical science in Europe for centuries, together with works of Hippocrates and Galen.

=== Europe ===
Conceptions of madness in the Middle Ages in Europe were a mixture of the divine, diabolical, magical and transcendental. Theories of the four humors (black bile, yellow bile, phlegm, and blood) were applied, sometimes separately (a matter of "physic") and sometimes combined with theories of evil spirits (a matter of "faith"). Arnaldus de Villanova (1235–1313) combined "evil spirit" and Galen-oriented "four humours" theories and promoted trephining as a cure to let demons and excess humours escape. Other bodily remedies in general use included purges, bloodletting and whipping. Madness was often seen as a moral issue, either a punishment for sin or a test of faith and character. Christian theology endorsed various therapies, including fasting and prayer for those estranged from God and exorcism of those possessed by the devil. Thus, although mental disorder was often thought to be due to sin, other more mundane causes were also explored, including intemperate diet and alcohol, overwork, and grief. The Franciscan friar Bartholomeus Anglicus (c. 1203 – 1272) described a condition which resembles depression in his encyclopedia, De Proprietatibis Rerum, and he suggested that music would help. A semi-official tract called the Praerogativa regis distinguished between the "natural born idiot" and the "lunatic". The latter term was applied to those with periods of mental disorder; deriving from either Roman mythology describing people "moonstruck" by the goddess Luna or theories of an influence of the moon.

Episodes of mass dancing mania are reported from the Middle Ages, "which gave to the individuals affected all the appearance of insanity". This was one kind of mass delusion or mass hysteria/panic that has occurred around the world through the millennia.

The care of lunatics was primarily the responsibility of the family. In England, if the family were unable or unwilling, an assessment was made by crown representatives in consultation with a local jury and all interested parties, including the subject himself or herself. The process was confined to those with real estate or personal estate, but it encompassed poor as well as rich and took into account psychological and social issues. Those considered lunatics at the time probably had more support from their communities and families than those diagnosed with mental disorders today, since the focus now is primarily on providing professional medical support. As in other eras, visions were generally interpreted as meaningful spiritual and visionary insights; some may have been causally related to mental disorders, but since hallucinations were culturally supported they may not have had the same connections as today.

== Modern period ==
=== Europe and the Americas ===
==== 16th to 18th centuries ====
Some mentally ill people may have been victims of the witch-hunts that spread in waves in early modern Europe. However, those judged insane were increasingly admitted to local workhouses, poorhouses and jails (particularly the "pauper insane") or sometimes to the new private madhouses. Restraints and forcible confinement were used for those thought dangerously disturbed or potentially violent to themselves, others or property. The latter likely grew out of lodging arrangements for single individuals (who, in workhouses, were considered disruptive or ungovernable) then there were a few catering each for only a handful of people, then they gradually expanded (e.g. 16 in London in 1774, and 40 by 1819). By the mid-19th century there would be 100 to 500 inmates in each. The development of this network of madhouses has been linked to new capitalist social relations and a service economy, that meant families were no longer able or willing to look after disturbed relatives.

Madness was commonly depicted in literary works, such as the plays of Shakespeare.

By the end of the 17th century and into the Enlightenment, madness was increasingly seen as an organic physical phenomenon, no longer involving the soul or moral responsibility. The mentally ill were typically viewed as insensitive wild animals. Harsh treatment and restraint in chains was seen as therapeutic, helping suppress the animal passions. There was sometimes a focus on the management of the environment of madhouses, from diet to exercise regimes to number of visitors. Severe somatic treatments were used, similar to those in medieval times. Madhouse owners sometimes boasted of their ability with the whip. Treatment in the few public asylums was also barbaric, often secondary to prisons. The most notorious was Bedlam where at one time spectators could pay a penny to watch the inmates as a form of entertainment.

Concepts based in humoral theory gradually gave way to metaphors and terminology from mechanics and other developing physical sciences. Complex new schemes were developed for the classification of mental disorders, influenced by emerging systems for the biological classification of organisms and medical classification of diseases.

The term "crazy" (from Middle English meaning cracked) and insane (from Latin insanus meaning unhealthy) came to mean mental disorder in this period. The term "lunacy", long used to refer to periodic disturbance or epilepsy, came to be synonymous with insanity. "Madness", long in use in root form since at least the early centuries AD, and originally meaning crippled, hurt or foolish, came to mean loss of reason or self-restraint. "Psychosis", from Greek "principle of life/animation", had varied usage referring to a condition of the mind/soul. "Nervous", from an Indo-European root meaning to wind or twist, meant muscle or vigor, was adopted by physiologists to refer to the body's electrochemical signaling process (thus called the nervous system), and was then used to refer to nervous disorders and neurosis. "Obsession", from a Latin root meaning to sit on or sit against, originally meant to besiege or be possessed by an evil spirit, came to mean a fixed idea that could decompose the mind.

With the rise of madhouses and the professionalization and specialization of medicine, there was a considerable incentive for medical doctors to become involved. In the 18th century, they began to stake a claim to a monopoly over madhouses and treatments. Madhouses could be a lucrative business, and many made a fortune from them. There were some bourgeois ex-patient reformers who opposed the often brutal regimes, blaming both the madhouse owners and the medics, who in turn resisted the reforms.

Towards the end of the 18th century, a moral treatment movement developed, that implemented more humane, psychosocial, and personalized approaches. Notable figures included the medic Vincenzo Chiarugi in Italy under Enlightenment leadership; the ex-patient superintendent Pussin and the psychologically inclined medic Philippe Pinel in revolutionary France; the Quakers in England, led by businessman William Tuke; and later, in the United States, campaigner Dorothea Dix.

==== 19th century ====
The 19th century, in the context of industrialization and population growth, saw a massive expansion of the number and size of insane asylums in every Western country, a process called "the great confinement" or the "asylum era". Laws were introduced to compel authorities to deal with those judged insane by family members and hospital superintendents. Although originally based on the concepts and structures of moral treatment, they became large impersonal institutions overburdened with large numbers of people with a complex mix of mental and social-economic problems. The success of moral treatment had cast doubt on the approach of medics, and many had opposed it, but by the mid-19th century many became advocates of it but argued that the mad also often had physical/organic problems so that both approaches were necessary. This argument has been described as an important step in the profession's eventual success in securing a monopoly on the treatment of lunacy. However, it is well documented that very little therapeutic activity occurred in the new asylum system, that medics were little more than administrators who seldom attended to patients, and then mainly for other physical problems. The "oldest forensic secure hospital in Europe" was opened in 1850 after Sir Thomas Freemantle introduced the bill that was to establish a Central Criminal Lunatic Asylum in Ireland on 19 May 1845.

Clear descriptions of some syndromes, such as the condition that would later be termed schizophrenia, have been identified as relatively rare prior to the 19th century, although interpretations of the evidence and its implications are inconsistent.

Numerous different classification schemes and diagnostic terms were developed by different authorities, taking an increasingly anatomical-clinical descriptive approach. The term "psychiatry" was coined as the medical specialty became more academically established. Asylum superintendents, later to be psychiatrists, were generally called "alienists" because they were thought to deal with people alienated from society; they adopted largely isolated and managerial roles in the asylums while milder "neurotic" conditions were dealt with by neurologists and general physicians, although there was overlap for conditions such as neurasthenia.

In the United States it was proposed that black slaves who tried to escape had a mental disorder termed drapetomania. It was then argued in scientific journals that mental disorders were rare under conditions of slavery but became more common following emancipation, and later that mental illness in African Americans was due to evolutionary factors or various negative characteristics, and that they were not suitable for therapeutic intervention.

By the 1870s in North America, officials who ran Lunatic Asylums renamed them Insane Asylums. By the late century, the term "asylum" had lost its original meaning as a place of refuge, retreat or safety, and was associated with abuses that had been widely publicized in the media, including by ex-patient organization the Alleged Lunatics' Friend Society and ex-patients like Elizabeth Packard.

The relative proportion of the public officially diagnosed with mental disorders was increasing, however. This has been linked to various factors, including possibly humanitarian concern; incentives for professional status/money; a lowered tolerance of communities for unusual behavior due to the existence of asylums to place them in (this affected the poor the most); and the strain placed on families by industrialization.

By the end of the 19th century, active management was more widely taught to medical students, with Diagnostiek der Zielsziekten (1891) including treatments such as hydrotherapy, electrotherapy, massages and bowel management.

==== 20th century ====
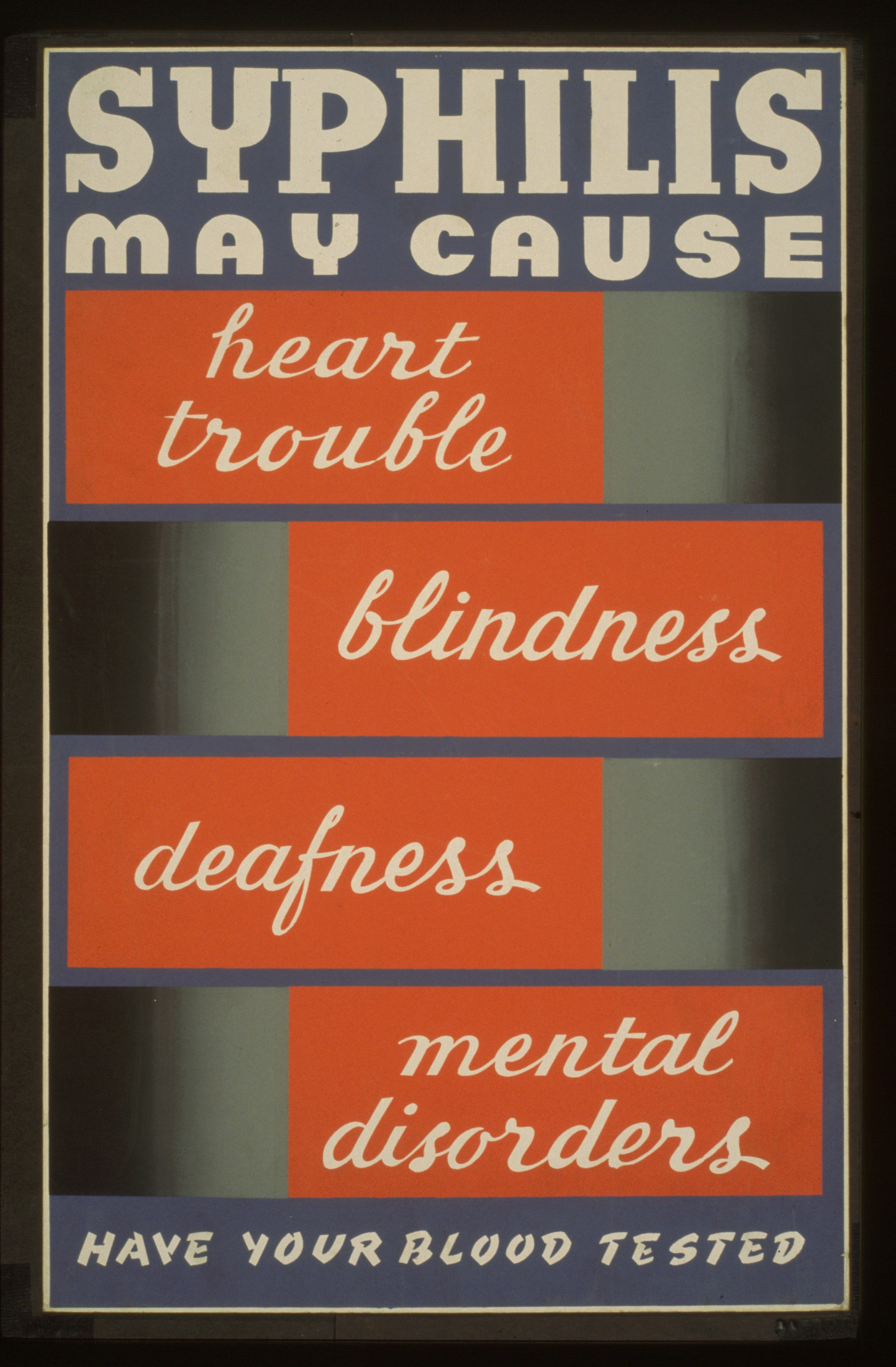
Poster promoting blood tests for syphilis.

The turn of the 20th century saw the development of psychoanalysis, which came to the fore later. Kraepelin's classification gained popularity, including the separation of mood disorders from what would later be termed schizophrenia.

Asylum superintendents sought to improve the image and medical status of their profession. Asylum "inmates" were increasingly referred to as "patients" and asylums renamed as hospitals. Referring to people as having a "mental illness" dates from this period in the early 20th century.

In the United States, a "mental hygiene" movement, originally defined in the 19th century, gained momentum and aimed to "prevent the disease of insanity" through public health methods and clinics. The term mental health became more popular, however. Clinical psychology and social work developed as professions alongside psychiatry. Theories of eugenics led to compulsory sterilization movements in many countries around the world for several decades, often encompassing patients in public mental institutions. World War I saw a massive increase of conditions that came to be termed "shell shock".

In Nazi Germany, the institutionalized mentally ill were among the earliest targets of sterilization campaigns and covert "euthanasia" programs. It has been estimated that over 200,000 individuals with mental disorders of all kinds were put to death, although their mass murder has received relatively little historical attention. Despite not being formally ordered to take part, psychiatrists and psychiatric institutions were at the center of justifying, planning and carrying out the atrocities at every stage, and "constituted the connection" to the later annihilation of Jews and other "undesirables" such as homosexuals in The Holocaust.

In other areas of the world, funding was often cut for asylums, especially during periods of economic decline, and during wartime in particular many patients starved to death. Soldiers received increased psychiatric attention, and World War II saw the development in the US of a new psychiatric manual for categorizing mental disorders, which along with existing systems for collecting census and hospital statistics led to the first Diagnostic and Statistical Manual of Mental Disorders (DSM). The International Classification of Diseases (ICD) followed suit with a section on mental disorders.

Previously restricted to the treatment of severely disturbed people in asylums, psychiatrists cultivated clients with a broader range of problems, and between 1917 and 1970 the number practicing outside institutions swelled from 8 percent to 66 percent. The term stress, having emerged from endocrinology work in the 1930s, was popularized with an increasingly broad biopsychosocial meaning, and was increasingly linked to mental disorders. "Outpatient commitment" laws were gradually expanded or introduced in some countries.

An antipsychiatry movement came to the fore in the 1960s. Deinstitutionalization gradually occurred in the West, with isolated psychiatric hospitals being closed down in favor of community mental health services. However, inadequate services and continued social exclusion often led to many being homeless or in prison. A consumer/survivor movement gained momentum.

Other kinds of psychiatric medication gradually came into use, such as "psychic energizers" and lithium. Benzodiazepines gained widespread use in the 1970s for anxiety and depression, until dependency problems curtailed their popularity. Advances in neuroscience and genetics led to new research agendas. Cognitive behavioral therapy was developed. Through the 1990s, new SSRI antidepressants became some of the most widely prescribed drugs in the world.

The DSM and then ICD adopted new criteria-based classification, representing a return to a Kraepelin-like descriptive system. The number of "official" diagnoses saw a large expansion, although homosexuality was gradually downgraded and dropped in the face of human rights protests. Different regions sometimes developed alternatives such as the Chinese Classification of Mental Disorders or Latin American Guide for Psychiatric Diagnosis.

In the early 20th century, lobotomy was introduced until the mid-1950s.

In 1927 insulin coma therapy was introduced and used until 1960. Physicians deliberately put the patient into a low blood sugar coma because they thought that large fluctuations in insulin levels could alter the function of the brain. Risks included prolonged coma. Electroconvulsive Therapy (ECT) was later adopted as a substitution to this treatment.

==== 21st century ====
DSM-IV and previous versions of the Diagnostic and Statistical Manual of Mental Disorders presented extremely high comorbidity, diagnostic heterogeneity of the categories, unclear boundaries, that have been interpreted as intrinsic anomalies of the criterial, neopositivistic approach leading the system to a state of scientific crisis. Accordingly, a radical rethinking of the concept of mental disorder and the need of a radical scientific revolution in psychiatric taxonomy was proposed.

In 2013, the American Psychiatric Association published the DSM-5.

Contemporary researchers have developed a perspective of evolutionary psychiatry, which interprets mental disorders partly through the lens of evolutionary theory. This approach often examines whether traits such as depression, anxiety, or attention differences might reflect adaptations to ancestral environments, or whether they are better understood as mismatches with modern settings.

== See also ==
- Anti-psychiatry
- Care in the Community
- DSM-IV codes
- History of psychiatric institutions
- Involuntary commitment
- Mad pride
- Neurology
- Political abuse of psychiatry in the Soviet Union
- Psychiatric hospital
- Psychiatric medication
- Psychiatric survivors movement
- Psychoanalysis
- Retrospective diagnosis
- Structured Clinical Interview for DSM-IV (SCID)
- Timeline of psychiatry
- Treatment of mental disorders
- Animal psychopathology
