= TeenScreen =

American mental health screening initiative

TeenScreen National Center
- Formation: 1999
- Purpose: Mental health screening
- Headquarters: New York City
- Key people: Executive director, Laurie Flynn
- Parent organization: Division of Child and Adolescent Psychiatry at Columbia University

The TeenScreen National Center for Mental Health Checkups at Columbia University was a national mental health and suicide risk screening initiative for middle- and high-school age adolescents. On November 15, 2012, according to its website, the program was terminated. The organization operated as a center in the Division of Child and Adolescent Psychiatry Department at Columbia University, in New York City. The program was developed at Columbia University in 1999, and launched nationally in 2003. Screening was voluntary and offered through doctors' offices, schools, clinics, juvenile justice facilities, and other youth-serving organizations and settings. As of August 2011, the program had more than 2,000 active screening sites across 46 states in the United States, and in other countries including Australia, Brazil, India and New Zealand.

== Screening program ==
=== Organization ===
The program was developed by a team of researchers at Columbia University, led by David Shaffer. The goal was to make researched and validated screening questionnaires available for voluntary identification of possible mental disorders and suicide risk in middle and high school students. The questionnaire they developed is known as the Columbia Suicide Screen, which entered into use in 1999, an early version of what is now the Columbia Health Screen. In 2003, the New Freedom Commission on Mental Health, created under the administration of George W. Bush, identified the TeenScreen program as a "model" program and recommended adolescent mental health screening become common practice.

The organization launched an initiative to provide voluntary mental health screening to all U.S. teens in 2003. The following year, TeenScreen was included in the national Suicide Prevention Resource Center's (SPRC) list of evidence-based suicide prevention programs. In 2007, it was included as an evidence-based program in the U.S. Substance Abuse and Mental Health Services Administration (SAMHSA)'s National Registry of Evidence-based Programs and Practices. In 2009, the organization launched the TeenScreen Primary Care initiative to increase mental health screening by pediatricians and other primary care providers, the same year the U.S. Preventive Services Task Force recommended annual adolescent mental health screening as part of routine primary care, and the Institute of Medicine recommended expansion of prevention and early identification programs.

As of 2011, the program was led by executive director Laurie Flynn, deputy executive director Leslie McGuire and scientific advisor Mark Olfson, M.D., alongside a National Advisory Council of healthcare professionals, educators and advocates.

As of November 15, 2012, TeenScreen has been terminated, will no longer train or register new programs, and will cease all operations by the end of the year.

=== Mission and locations ===
The mission of the TeenScreen National Center was to expand and improve the early identification of mental health problems in youth. In particular, TeenScreen aimed to find young people at risk of suicide or developing mental health disorders so they could be referred for a comprehensive mental health evaluation by a health professional. The program focuses on providing screening to young people in the 11-18 age range. From 2003 until 2012, the program was offered nationally in schools, clinics, doctors' offices and in youth service environments such as shelters and juvenile justice settings. As of August 2011, more than 2,000 primary care providers, schools and community-based sites in 46 states offered adolescent mental health screening through the TeenScreen National Center. In addition, the screening was also being provided in other countries including Australia, Brazil, India, New Zealand and Scotland.

=== Screening process ===
TeenScreen provided materials, training and technical help through its TeenScreen Primary Care and Schools and Communities programs for primary care providers, schools and youth-serving organizations that provided mental health screening to adolescents. A toolkit was provided, including researched and validated questionnaires, instructions for administering, scoring and interpreting the screening responses. Primary care program materials included information on primary care referrals for clinical evaluation. In the school and community setting, the screening process was voluntary and required active parental consent and participant assent prior to screening sessions.

The validated questionnaires included items about depression, thoughts of suicide and attempts, anxiety, and substance use. The screening questionnaires typically took up to ten minutes for an adolescent to complete. Once the responses to the questionnaire had been reviewed, any adolescent identified as being at possible risk for suicide or other mental health concerns would then assessed by a health or mental health professional. The result of this assessment determined whether the adolescent could be referred for mental health services. If this was the case, parents were involved and provided with help locating the appropriate mental health services.

== Research, endorsements and responses ==
=== Recommendations and research ===
Mental health screening has been endorsed by the former U.S. Surgeon General David Satcher, who launched a "Call to Action" in 1999 encouraging the development and implementation of safe, effective school-based programs offering intervention, help and support to young people with mental health issues. TeenScreen is included as an evidence-based program in the U.S. Substance Abuse and Mental Health Services Administration (SAMHSA)'s National Registry of Evidence-based Programs and Practices as a scientifically tested and reviewed intervention. In addition, the U.S. Preventive Services Task Force recommended in 2009 that mental health screening for teenagers be integrated into routine primary care appointments.

Studies have been conducted on the effectiveness and impact of mental health screening for young people. In a 2004 systematic evidence review, the U.S. Preventive Services Task Force found that there were no studies that addressed whether screening as part of primary care reduced morbidity and mortality, nor any information of the potential risks of screening. In a later review, published in 2009, the task force found that there was evidence supporting the efficacy of screening tools in identifying teenagers at risk of suicide or mental health disorders.

A team of researchers from Columbia University and the New York State Psychiatric Institute completed a randomized controlled clinical trial on the impact of suicide screening on high school students in New York State from 2002-2004. The study found that students who were given a questionnaire about suicide were no more likely to report suicidal thoughts after the survey than students in the control group who had not been questioned. Neither was there any greater risk for "high risk" students. A subsequent study by the researchers, in 2009, found that screening appeared to increase the likelihood that adolescents would receive treatment if they were at risk for mental health disorders or suicide.

A study published in 2011, involving 2,500 high school students, examined the value of routine mental health screening in school to identify adolescents at-risk for mental illness, and to connect those adolescents with recommended follow-up care. The research, conducted between 2005 and 2009 at six public high schools in suburban Wisconsin, found that nearly three out of four high school students identified as being at-risk for having a mental health problem were not in treatment at the time of screening. Of those students identified as at-risk, a significant majority (76.3 percent) completed at least one visit with a mental health provider within 90 days of screening. More than half (56.3 percent) received minimally adequate treatment, defined as having three or more visits with a provider, or any number of visits if termination was agreed to by the provider.

A separate study published in 2011, found that mental health screening was effective at connecting African-American middle school students from a predominantly low-income area with school-based mental health services. Researchers have also found evidence to support the addition of mental health screenings for adolescents while undergoing routine physical examinations.

=== Acceptance and critical responses ===
Recommendations endorsing adolescent mental health screening have been issued by the Institute of Medicine (IOM) and the U.S. Preventative Services Task Force (USPSTF). The American Academy of Pediatrics recommends assessment of mental health at primary care visits and suggests the use of validating screening instruments. These add to statements and recommendations to screen adolescents for mental illness from the American Medical Association (AMA), the Society for Adolescent Health and Medicine, the American Academy of Family Physicians and the National Association of Pediatric Nurse Practitioners. TeenScreen has been endorsed by a number of organizations, including the National Alliance for the Mentally Ill, and federal and state commissions such as the New Freedom Commission.

There is opposition to mental health screening programs in general and TeenScreen in particular, from civil liberties, parental rights, and politically conservative groups. Much of the opposition is led by groups who claim that the organization is funded by the pharmaceutical industry; however, in 2011, an inquiry launched by Senator Charles E. Grassley into the funding of health advocacy groups by pharmaceutical, medical-device, and insurance companies demonstrated to Senator Grassley's satisfaction that TeenScreen does not receive funding from the pharmaceutical industry. Sen. Grassley sent a letter to TeenScreen and 33 other organizations like the American Cancer Society asking about their financial ties to the pharmaceutical industry. TeenScreen replied saying they did not accept money from medical companies.

In 2005, TeenScreen was criticized following media coverage of a suit filed a local screening program in Indiana by the parents of a teenager who had taken part in screening. The suit alleged that the screening had taken place without parents' permissions. The complaint led to a change in how parental consent was handled by TeenScreen sites. In 2006, the program's policy was amended so that active rather than passive consent was required from parents before screening adolescents in a school setting.
