= Allen Jones (whistleblower) =

Allen Jones, gained widespread attention as a 'whistleblower' after discovering that state employees were receiving kickbacks from the pharmaceutical industry in Texas while working as an investigator in the Pennsylvania Office of the Inspector General (OIG). According to several sources he discovered similar issues in Pennsylvania as well, but when investigating the Department of Welfare he was told to back down, and that the pharmaceutical industry "write checks to both sides of the aisle." "

== See also ==
- Anti-psychiatry
- Biological psychiatry
- New Freedom Commission on Mental Health
