= Collaborative Perinatal Project =

Multisite cohort study in the United States

The Collaborative Perinatal Project (abbreviated CPP), also known as the National Collaborative Perinatal Project (or NCPP), was a multisite prospective cohort study designed to identify the effects of complications during either pregnancy or the perinatal period on birth and child outcomes, especially neurological disorders such as cerebral palsy. It was conducted by the National Institute of Neurological and Communicative Disorders and Stroke on over 55,000 pregnant mothers at 12 sites across the United States from 1959 to 1965. It is one of the largest and broadest epidemiological studies in American history; according to Mark Klebanoff, "No U.S.-based study of pregnancy and childhood conducted before or since has matched its size, breadth and depth".

== History ==
The CPP originated in 1954, when funding for the study was approved as a line item in the budget of the National Institute of Neurological Diseases and Blindness (later renamed the National Institute of Neurological Disorders and Stroke). It was originally dubbed the "Collaborative Study of Cerebral Palsy, Mental Retardation and Other Neurological and Sensory Disorders of Infants and Children". It was later renamed the Cerebral Palsy Project, and then renamed again to the Collaborative Perinatal Project. More recently, the word "National" has often been added to the name of the study. It was controversial from its inception, with critics arguing that the data being collected was of poor quality, and that the funding for the study would be better spent a larger number of smaller, more focused projects. Nevertheless, later validation studies demonstrated that the study's data was actually high-quality.

== Methods ==
The CPP enrolled its first woman on January 2, 1959. It was conducted at 12 academic centers, which had the advantage of facilitating expert involvement in the research and to complete follow-up, but had the drawback of decreasing representativeness. Each of the centers also had its own sampling frame, but many audits were developed to ensure that participants who were recruited were representative of the sampling frame. Researchers collected data on participants' "pre-pregnancy weight, height, and time to pregnancy; demographic and smoking related data; and reproductive, medical, and gynecological history." Maternal serum screening was also performed on each woman at each study visit.

== Published results ==
The first major report describing the study's findings was The Women and Their Pregnancies, published in 1972. The study also followed up on 37,431 babies born from 1959 to 1966; the results of this follow-up were described in the 1979 book The First Year of Life.
