= Open Path Collective =

Nonprofit network of psychotherapy professionals

- Company type: Nonprofit organization
- Industry: Psychotherapy
- Founded: 2013; 13 years ago
- Founders: Paul Fugelsang
- Headquarters: Asheville, North Carolina, U.S.
- Area served: United States
- Services: Psychotherapy network
- Website: openpathcollective.org

Open Path Collective is a nonprofit network of psychotherapy professionals who offer discounted services to members. Providers offer both in person and telemedicine services. Rates are offered at a significant discount to prevailing local prices for mental health services. The collective was started by Paul Fugelsang in 2013.

Membership is reserved for people who make less than $100,000 per year, and who cannot find providers through their insurance plan. To become a member, clients are asked to self certify that they are financially eligible, and cannot find appropriate care through their insurance. Clients also pay a one-time $65 fee to become a lifetime member. If their financial situation changes, members are expected to reevaluate the fee structure with their therapist. Couples who use the service are only charged one membership fee when they use couples therapy.

The network includes, licensed professional counselors, interns, and pre-licensed professionals; all of which offer their services at different prices. There is no cost for therapists to list their name in the directory.
