= Diagnostiek der Zielsziekten =

1891 book by J.W.H Wijsman

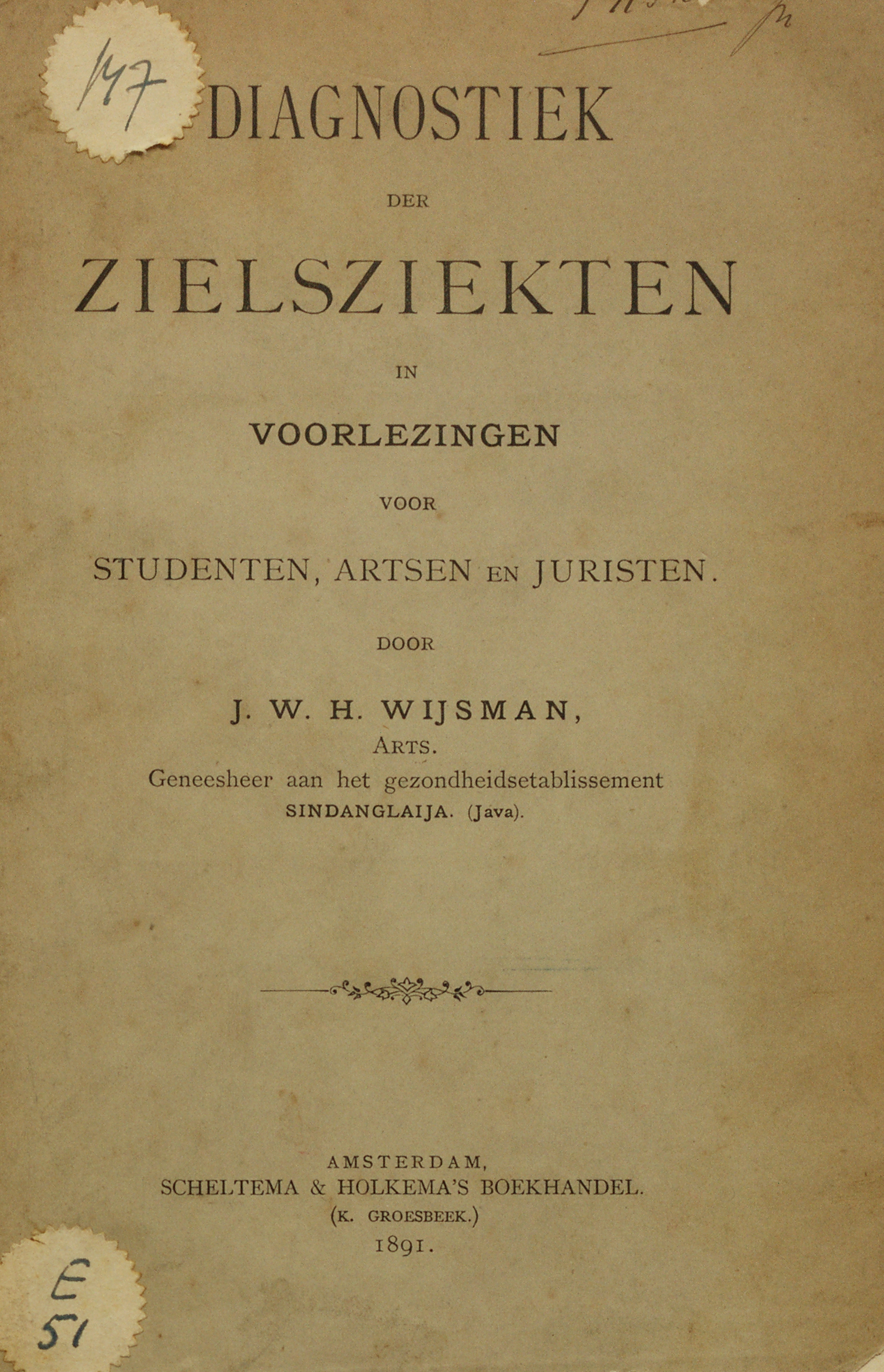
- Author: J.W.H Wijsman
- Original title: Diagnostiek der zielsziekten in voorlezingen voor studenten, artsen en juristen
- Language: Dutch
- Publisher: Scheltema & Holkema
- Publication date: 1891
- Pages: 248

The book Diagnostiek der Zielsziekten in voorlezingen voor studenten, artsen en juristen (English: Diagnostics for Mind diseases in Lectures for students, medical practitioners and jurists) is an 1891 book written by J.W.H Wijsman. Wijsman (1857–1928) was born in The Hague and studied in Amsterdam. In 1882, he became officer of health in the East Indies and worked as medical practitioner and director at the health establishment Sindanglaija. After this position, he came back to the Netherlands and became a school doctor in 1904. During the years Wijsman lived in the East Indies, he wrote the book Diagnostics for mind diseases as a manual for medical practitioners. According to him, medical practitioners had very little knowledge about psychiatry, and without this knowledge they could not examine and treat mentally ill people in a proper way.

== Structure ==
The book contains ten lectures. These lectures make up the chapters of the book. The first chapter, which is called Aetiology. Medical examination (Aetiologie. Ziekenonderzoek), gives an introduction of possible causes for mental diseases and instructions for diagnosing these diseases. The next six chapters are about specific diseases, in each chapter a couple of related diseases are discussed:

- hallucinations, illusions, affects, moods, delusions, hallucinational confusion and paranoia.
- psychical feelings, psychical perverse feelings, idiocy and melancholy
- mania, insanity, mental impairment, stupor and progressive paralysis.
- senile dementia, deficient judgement, imbecility, idiocy and cretinism, obsessions and compulsions
- chronic alcoholism, dipsomania and the working of alcohol by psychopathic predisposition
- morphinism, opium and cocaine abuse, lead poisoning, physical changes because of phthysis pulmonum (pulmonary tuberculosis), hysteria, epilepsy, organic brain diseases, lues cerebralis (neurosyphilis), psychical infection, children's crusade, dinomania, tarantismus.

The next chapter is named Therapy, this chapter mentions treatments for mental illness in general and treatments for some specific diseases. The chapter thereafter is about the laws related to mentally ill people in the Netherlands and in the East Indies. Finally, the last chapter contains medical reports in Dutch, German and French and gives information about crimes and accountability in case of people with mental diseases. At the end, former mental hospitals in the Netherlands and the East Indies are listed.

== Contents ==
=== Aetiology. Medical examination ===
Wijsman mentions a couple possible causes for mental illnesses. Important are inborn or obtained predispositions for functional or anatomical changes in the brain. Life or work circumstances can stimulate these predisposition or can exhaust the brain. Exhausting the brain can evolve in nutritional disturbance in the brain, which can lead to functional or anatomical changes. According to the book, even masturbating can contribute to mental illnesses, because this should irritate the nervous system and therefore could stimulate a predisposition.

A remarkable comment about these predispositions is that men should carry less predispositions compared to woman. Eventually, they will have just as much mental illnesses as woman, because men should be exposed to more difficulties in life.

In diagnosing a mental illness, the medical practitioner has to look into the past of the patient, for diseases or life events of family members and to circumstances at the time of conception. Other good indicators can be facial expressions, handwriting or physical abnormalities. Especially skull abnormalities are important, therefore medical practitioners will often do a skull measure. For some specific diseases the book gives certain features in handwriting, facial expressions and skull measures.

=== Therapy ===
For treating a mental disease, the medical practitioner has to search for the cause of this disease. If the cause can be found, taking it away can help in case of a disorder caused by functional changes in the brain. If a patient has anatomical brain changes, a surgical treatment is needed. If the cause cannot be found or cannot be taken away, the symptoms of the disease must be treated.

The patient often has to get rest and can be taken out of his old environment. If it is really necessary to keep the patient in bed or to prevent masturbation, a straitjacket can be used. Appropriate nutrition is also important, meals have to vary and for some diseases a certain diet is needed. For example, a patient with mania has to avoid meat because this can irritate the nervous system. In case of food refusal a patient has to move as little as possible to reserve recourses and a stomach tube can be used.

Other possible treatments are hydrotherapy, electrotherapy or massages. These can be used to stimulate the bowel movement or treat insomnia. A healthy bowel movement is important because obstipation can have a bad influence on mood.

=== Laws concerning mentally ill people in the Netherlands and the East-Indies ===
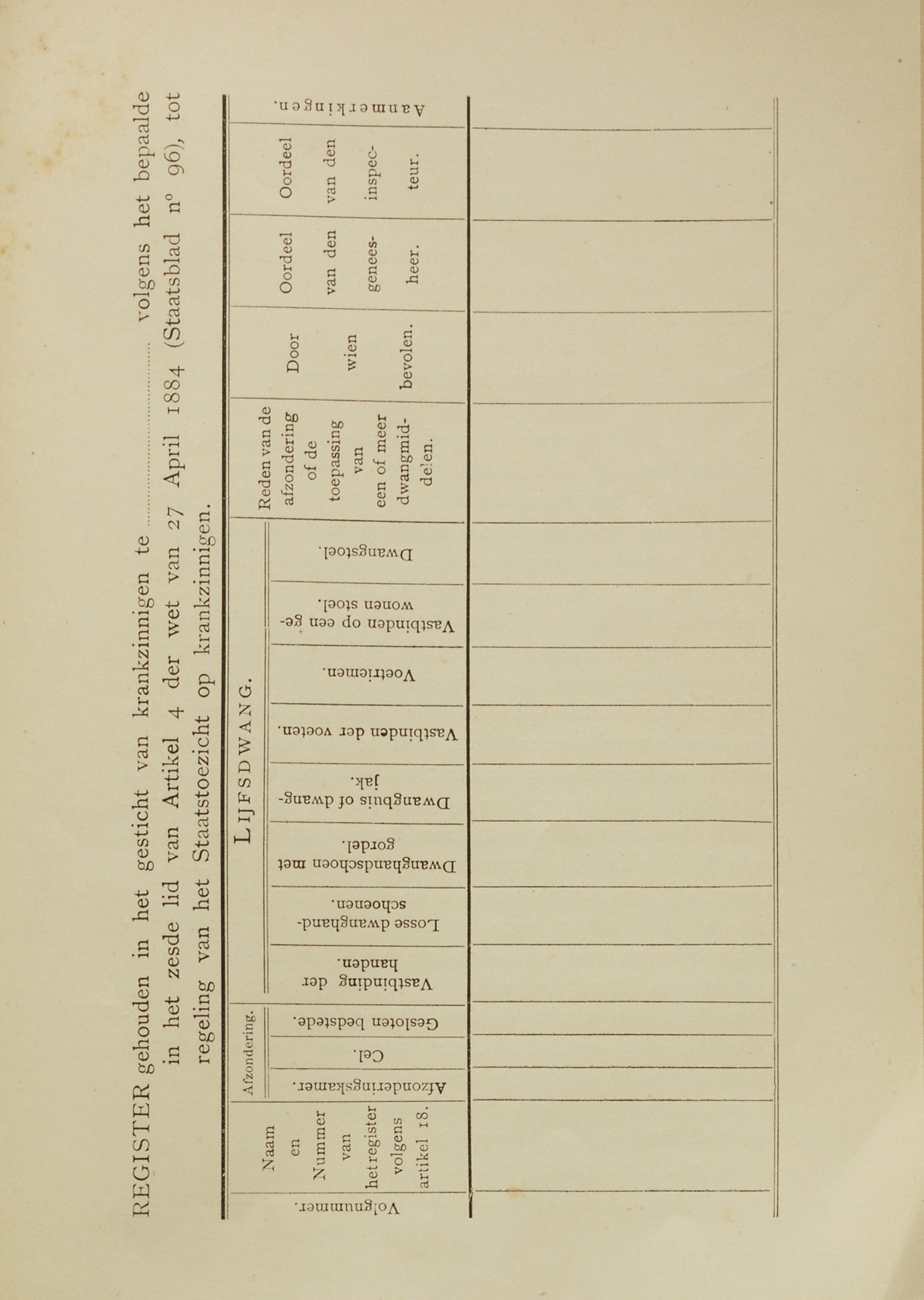
Registration form for use of coercive means

A license is mandatory for establishing a mental hospital. Each mental hospital is kept under strict supervision and will get unsuspected inspections. Every use of coercive means must be noted in a register. In case of hospitalization, removing, leave, dismissal or death, a written announcement must be made. The patient himself, other people or justice can demand for hospitalization of a patient and permission is required before a patient can be hospitalized.

With permission from the person who requested the hospitalization, the patient can go home for a short period of time. Dismissal from hospital can also be requested by the same person, if this person is not available, relatives or the city council can do it as well. If dismissal is requested, the medical practitioner will give an advice on this request and the final decision will be made by the court.

One final striking law in this chapter states that if people are hospitalized because their mental illness, they lose most of the possessions they have.

=== Judicial-medical reports ===
The most common crimes done by mentally ill people are: murder, theft, arson and fraud. For some diseases certain crimes are very distinctive, for example; paranoia is associated with murder and idiocy with moral offenses.

To decide about the liability in case of certain crimes, a mental examination can be done, which can change the sentence. A medical report contains the answers patients have given to questions of the medical practitioner, the impression the practitioner has of the patient and remarkable occurrences. The examination of genitals and skull measures is also mentioned. Further, it concludes the confession and explanation of the crime and the opinions of people who know the patient. At the end the conclusions of the examination and the continuation of the process are stated. Examples of these medical reports are included in the final chapter.

Because mental illnesses are difficult to simulate, fraud is not very common. Simulating a disease is very exhausting and can be noticed fast. Moreover, some features are not to simulate, like changes in respiration or blood circulation. The book gives an advice in how to handle by suspecting fraud: ignore the person and if this does not work ask critical questions. If the person still won't budge, he can be placed in a mental hospital, because he will stand out eventually.

== Reception ==
The book is reviewed in a critical way by Dr. Pierre F, Spaink in 1891. According to him, the book provides a better view towards mentally ill people, because at that time they were thought of in a bad way and often treated wrong. It is also very helpful for medical students, because it is clear written and gives a lot of information about different aspects of the psychiatry. Further gives the book good tips and warnings which can be helpful by treating mentally ill patients.

Although the review is primarily positive, Spaink also gives some critics and recommendations. He has a strong opinion against the use of a straitjacket. He believes that it is not possible that a straitjacket can help with giving a patient rest, because they will always try to get rid of it and this gives a lot of agitation. Spaink also introduces some other possible causes for mental diseases which he thinks should be implemented in the book.

== Timeframe ==
In the beginning of the book Wijsman mentions the wrong way mentally ill people have been treated in the past. At that time, they were not seen as people with an illness, but instead as people possessed by an 'evil spirit'. Clergy tried to drive this 'spirit' out of the body with painful 'treatments'.

In the time the book is written, mentally ill people are more and more treated by medical practitioners instead of clergy. Mental disease were still named soul diseases, but were not anymore seen as diseases of the soul. The last years before the book is written, people started to believe that mental illnesses are caused by functional or anatomical changes in the nervous system, especially in the brain.

Although the view towards mentally ill people began to change in this time, they were still seen as insane and weird by most people. People also had a really strong aversion against mental hospitals, which they named mad houses.

In the book Wijsman introduces mentally ill people as people with a disease who need the right help. He believed that mental illnesses are brain diseases which produce psychical symptoms and encourages less harmful treatments, with as little as possible coercive means. This more positive view towards mentally ill people and their treatment became more present at the time of the book. It is possible that Wijsman contributed to this shift.

== Sources ==
- Wijsman, J.H.W (1891). Diagnostiek der Zielsziekten in voorlezingen voor studenten, artsen en juristen (in Dutch). Scheltema & Holkema.
- Spaink, Pierre (1891). "Boekaankondiging" (PDF) (in Dutch).
