= Texas Medication Algorithm Project =

The Texas Medication Algorithm Project (TMAP) is a decision-tree medical algorithm, the design of which was based on the expert opinions of mental health specialists. It has provided and rolled out a set of psychiatric management guidelines for doctors treating certain mental disorders within Texas' publicly funded mental health care system, along with manuals relating to each of them The algorithms commence after diagnosis and cover pharmacological treatment (hence "Medication Algorithm").

== History ==
TMAP was initiated in the fall of 1997 and the initial research covered around 500 patients.

TMAP arose from a collaboration that began in 1995 between the Texas Department of Mental Health and Mental Retardation (TDMHMR), pharmaceutical companies, and the University of Texas Southwestern. The research was supported by the National Institute of Mental Health, the Robert Wood Johnson Foundation, the Meadows Foundation, the Lightner-Sams Foundation, the Nanny Hogan Boyd Charitable Trust, TDMHMR, the Center for Mental Health Services, the Department of Veterans Affairs, the Health Services Research and Development Research Career Scientist Award, the United States Pharmacopoeia Convention Inc. and Mental Health Connections.

Numerous companies that invent and develop antipsychotic medications provided use of their medications and furnished funding for the project. Companies did not participate in the production of the guidelines. However, in 2012 Dr. Stephen Shon, the medical director of Department of Mental Health and Mental Retardation (MHMR) and author of TMAP, admitted to receiving direct payment from the company Janssen Phamaceuticals while leading the creation of TMAP. Under such influence, TMAP favored drugs sold by Jansen. For example, the widely used antipsychotic drug Haldol was replaced with the more expensive Risperdal for every potential Haldol user covered by Texas Medicaid. Resperdal cost 40 times more than Haldol, had worse side effects, and had a similar efficacy to Haldol.

In 2004, TMAP was mentioned as an example of a successful project in a paper regarding implementing mental health screening programs throughout the United States, by President George W. Bush's New Freedom Commission on Mental Health, which looks to expand the program federally. The President had previously been Governor of Texas, in the period when TMAP was implemented. Similar programs have been implemented in about a dozen States, according to a 2004 report in the British Medical Journal.

Similar algorithms with similar prescribing advice have been produced elsewhere, for instance at the Maudsley Hospital, London.
