= New Freedom Commission on Mental Health =

US commission established in 2002

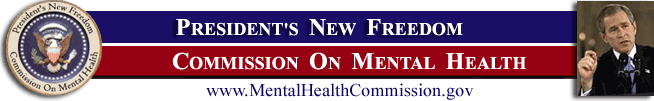

The New Freedom Commission on Mental Health was established by U.S. President George W. Bush through Executive Order 13263 on April 29, 2002, to conduct a comprehensive study of the U.S. mental health service delivery system and make recommendations based on its findings. The commission has been touted as part of his commitment to eliminate inequality for Americans with disabilities.

The President directed the commission to identify policies that could be implemented by Federal, State and local governments to maximize the utility of existing resources, improve coordination of treatments and services, and promote successful community integration for adults with a serious mental illness and children with a serious emotional disturbance. The commission, using the Texas Medication Algorithm Project (TMAP) as a blueprint, subsequently recommended screening of American adults for possible mental illnesses, and children for emotional disturbances, thereby identifying those with suspected disabilities who could then be provided with support services and state-of-the-art treatment, often in the form of newer psychoactive drugs that entered the market in recent years.

A broad-based coalition of mental health consumers, families, providers, and advocates has supported the Commission process and recommendations, using the commission's findings as a launching point for recommending widespread reform of the nation's mental health system.

A coalition of opponents questioned the motives of the commission, based on the results from a similar 1995 Texas mandate while Bush was Governor. During the Texas Medication Algorithm Project mandate, psychotropic medication was wrongfully prescribed to the general public. Specifically, TMAP and drug manufacturers marketed 'atypical antipsychotic drugs', such as Seroquel, Zyprexa, and others, for a wide variety of non-psychotic behavior issues. These drugs were later found to cause increased rates of sudden death in patients.

In addition to atypical antipsychotic drugs, earlier versions of psychotropic medications, including Prozac, were found to sharply increase rates of suicide, especially during the first month of drug use. Also during TMAP, psychotropic medication was wrongfully prescribed to people not suffering from mental illness, including troublesome children and difficult elderly people in nursing homes. In 2009, Eli Lilly was found guilty of wrongfully marketing Zyprexa for non-psychotic people.

Opponents also assert the New Freedom initiative campaign is a thinly veiled proxy for the pharmaceutical industry to foster psychotropic medication on mentally healthy individuals in its pursuit of profits. Opponents also contend that the initiative's wider objectives are to foster chemical behavior control of American citizens, contrary to civil liberties and to basic human rights.

== Reports ==
=== Interim report ===
The commission issued an interim report on November 1, 2002. Findings in the report included estimated prevalence of severe mental illness among adults and severe emotional disturbance in children, the existence of effective treatments, and barriers to care.

=== Final report ===
On July 22, 2003, the President's commission returned a report containing nineteen formal recommendations, organized under six proposed national goals for mental health. The commission emphasised recovery from mental illness, calls for consumer and family-centered care, and recommendations that states develop a more comprehensive approach to mental health.

The commission reported that "despite their prevalence, mental disorders often go undiagnosed," so it recommended comprehensive mental health screening for "consumers of all ages," including preschool children, because "each year, young children are expelled from preschools and childcare facilities for severely disruptive behaviors and emotional disorders."

In contradiction, the Congressional Research Service, stated the commission did not specifically recommend a nationwide screening program for mental illness, while it did discuss the need to identify mental illness in certain settings (juvenile detention facilities, foster care). The commission also recommended deeper study of the safety and effectiveness of medication use, especially among children.

== Recommendations ==
Noting the country's services for people with mental illness and disabilities were "fragmented," the commission's final report offered 19 recommendations within six larger goals to improve service coordination, move toward a recovery model, and help all individuals with mental illness and disability recover:

1. Americans Understand that Mental Health Is Essential to Overall Health.
  - Advance and implement a national campaign to reduce the stigma of seeking care and a national strategy for suicide prevention.
  - Address mental health with the same urgency as physical health.
2. Mental Health Care Is Consumer and Family Driven.
  - Develop an individualized plan of care for every adult with a serious mental illness and child with a serious emotional disturbance.
  - Involve consumers and families fully in orienting the mental health system toward recovery.
  - Align relevant Federal programs to improve access and accountability for mental health services.
  - Create a Comprehensive State Mental Health Plan.
  - Protect and enhance the rights of people with mental illnesses.
3. Disparities in Mental Health Services Are Eliminated.
  - Improve access to quality care that is culturally competent.
  - Improve access to quality care in rural and geographically remote areas.
4. Early Mental Health Screening, Assessment, and Referral to Services Are Common Practice.
  - Promote the mental health of young children.
  - Improve and expand school mental health programs.
  - Screen for co-occurring mental and substance use disorders and link with integrated treatment strategies.
  - Screen for mental disorders in primary health care, across the life span, and connect to treatment and supports.
5. Excellent Mental Health Care Is Delivered and Research Is Accelerated.
  - Accelerate research to promote recovery and resilience, and ultimately to cure and prevent mental illnesses.
  - Advance evidence-based practices using dissemination and demonstration projects and create a public–private partnership to guide their implementation.
  - Improve and expand the workforce providing evidence-based mental health services and supports.
  - Develop the knowledge base in four understudied areas: mental health disparities, long-term effects of medications, trauma, and acute care.
6. Technology Is Used to Access Mental Health Care and Information.
  - Use health technology and telehealth to improve access and coordination of mental health care, especially for Americans in remote areas or in underserved populations.
  - Develop and implement integrated electronic health record and personal health information systems.

== Opposition ==
Opponents of the plan see little in the way of potential benefits from the plan, except increased profits for pharmaceutical companies, and have concerns about the potential for unnecessarily causing neurological damage and contributing to increased substance abuse and drug dependence. Critics are also concerned by what they see as the pharmaceutical industry's use of front organizations and the compromise of scientific integrity under color of authority, look askance at the irony of the commission's 'freedom' descriptor, contending the commission is yet another example of the excesses of drug industry marketing, and that the effects of its recommendations will simply foster drug use rather than the prevention of mental illness and use of alternative treatment modalities.

=== Screening recommendations ===
Mad in America author Robert Whitaker criticized the commission's screening recommendations as "fishing for customers." A coalition of over 100 advocacy organizations, united under the banner of Mindfreedom.org in representing the psychiatric survivors movement, has been galvanized by their strong opposition to the New Freedom Commission. Using celebrity to advance their opposition, the MindFreedom coalition has again enlisted the support of longtime member and Gesundheit Institute founder Patch Adams, a medical doctor made famous by the movie that bears his name. Since 1992, Adams has supported MindFreedom campaigns, and in August, 2004, he kicked off the campaign against the New Freedom Commission by volunteering to screen President Bush himself. "He needs a lot of help. I'll see him for free," said Adams.

Others, including Congressman Ron Paul (R-TX14), were more concerned by the commission's suggestion to use schools as a site for screening. Paul's concern led to the introduction of H.R. 181 Parental Consent Act of 2005 in the US House of Representatives on January 4, 2005. The bill, which died in committee, would have forbidden federal funds from being used for any mental health screening of students without the express, written, voluntary, informed consent of parents. Paul introduced similar bills in May 2007 (H.R. 2387), April 2009 (H.R. 2218), and August 2011 (H.R. 2769); those, likewise, died in committee.

=== TMAP origin criticism ===
Critics also contend that the strategy behind the commission was developed by the pharmaceutical industry, advancing the theory that the primary purpose of the commission was to recommend implementation of TMAP based algorithms on a nationwide basis. TMAP, which advises the use of newer, more expensive medications, has itself been the subject of controversy in Texas, Pennsylvania and other states where efforts have been made to implement its use.

TMAP, which was created in 1995 while President Bush was governor of Texas, began as an alliance of individuals from the University of Texas, the pharmaceutical industry, and the mental health and corrections systems of Texas. Through the guise of TMAP, critics contend, the drug industry has methodically influenced the decision making of elected and appointed public officials to gain access to citizens in prisons and State psychiatric hospitals. The person primarily responsible for bringing these issues to the public's attention is Allen Jones, a former investigator in the Commonwealth of Pennsylvania Office of Inspector General (OIG), Bureau of Special Investigations.

Jones wrote a lengthy report in which he stated that, behind the recommendations of the New Freedom Commission, was the "political/pharmaceutical alliance." It was this alliance, according to Jones, which developed the Texas project, specifically to promote the use of newer, more expensive antipsychotics and antidepressants. He further claimed this alliance was "poised to consolidate the TMAP effort into a comprehensive national policy to treat mental illness with expensive, patented medications of questionable benefit and deadly side effects, and to force private insurers to pick up more of the tab."

== See also ==
- Allen Jones (whistleblower)
- Anti-psychiatry
- Biological psychiatry
- Involuntary treatment
- List of psychiatric drugs
- List of psychiatric drugs by condition treated
- Outpatient commitment
- Psychopharmacology
- Psychotherapy
- TeenScreen
- Self-help groups for mental health
- List of twelve-step groups
- Twelve-step program
- Recovery model
