= Bibliography of Gianni Berengo Gardin =

List of books of the work of the Italian photographer Gianni Berengo Gardin

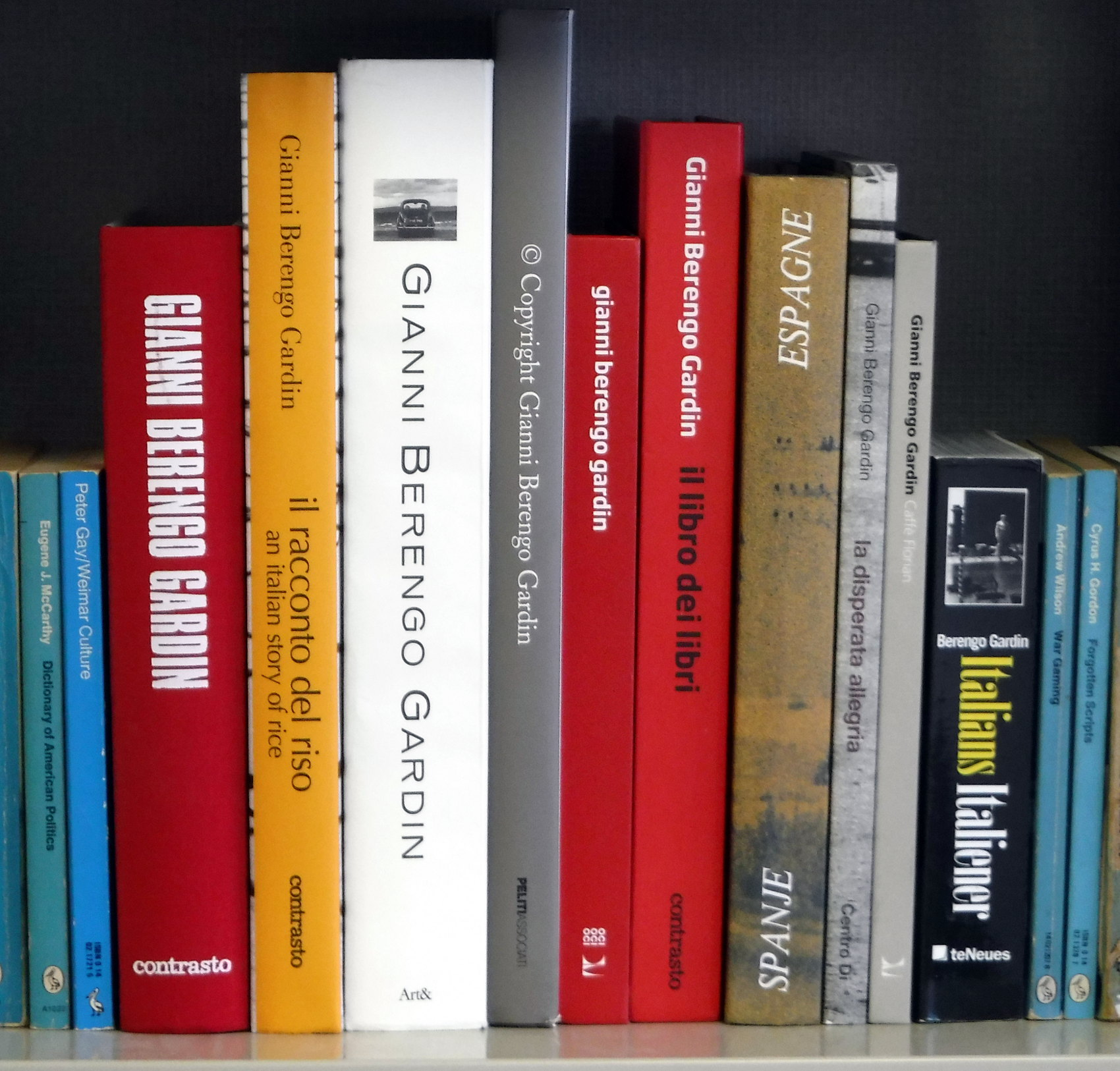
A small selection of photobooks by Gianni Berengo Gardin (flanked by off-topic blue Pelican paperbacks)

The Italian photographer Gianni Berengo Gardin (1930–2025) has been the sole contributor or a major contributor to a large number of photobooks from 1960 to the present.

Berengo Gardin's photobooks have included those for Touring Club Italiano (TCI) about regions within and outside Italy; multiple, TCI-unrelated books about particular parts of Italy, some of them lesser known (e.g. Polesine); books about particular artists (e.g. Giorgio Morandi); books about architecture (particularly that by Renzo Piano); and other commissioned publications (particularly for Istituto geografico De Agostini and Olivetti).

A large book published in 2013, Gianni Berengo Gardin. Il libro dei libri (Gianni Berengo Gardin: The book of books), introduces books with contributions by Berengo Gardin, presenting their covers and sample page spreads, and providing brief bibliographical information.

== Highlights ==
In the citation for Berengo Gardin's honorary doctorate (2009), the University of Milan singled out the books Morire di classe (1969, with Carla Cerati); Dentro le case (1977); Dentro il lavoro (1978); Un paese vent'anni dopo (1973, with Cesare Zavattini); In treno attraverso l'Italia (1991, with Ferdinando Scianna and Roberto Koch); Italiani (1999); and Reportage in Sardegna (2006).

India dei villaggi (1981) won the Scanno prize; La disperata allegria (1994) won the Leica Oskar Barnack Award at Rencontres internationales de la photographie d'Arles; and Zingari a Palermo (1997) won the Oscar Goldoni prize.

Asked to pick the one book of his that he would like to be known two hundred years into the future, Berengo Gardin was unable to decide among Italiani; a book on rice cultivation; (Note: This could be Terre di risaia (Rome: Peliti, 2001; ISBN 88-85121-75-6), but is more likely to be the larger Il racconto del riso = An Italian Story of Rice (Rome: Contrasto, 2013; ISBN 978-88-6965-425-1).) and Morire di classe.

== Books by or with contributions by Berengo Gardin ==
=== 1960s ===
- Biagio Rossetti, architetto ferrarese. Il primo architetto moderno europeo. Collana storia di architettura (in Italian). Vol. 4. Turin: Einaudi. 1960. OCLC 1106670. On the Ferrarese architect Biagio Rossetti; photography by Berengo Gardin; text by Bruno Zevi; 728 pages. (Note: Under the title "... ancora libri", briefly introduced in Bruno Carbone, ed. Gianni Berengo Gardin. Il libro dei libri. Rome: Contrasto Due, 2013. ISBN 978-88-6965-444-2.) (Note: Although the OCLC record does not mention Berengo Gardin, there is other evidence for his contribution.)
- Le case-fondaco sul Canal Grande. Contributo allo studio dell'architettura civile veneziana dal IX al XII secolo (in Italian). Vol. 1. Venice: Scattolin. 1961. OCLC 313785134. On the houses on the Grand Canal in Venice; photography by Berengo Gardin, text by Giorgia Scattolin; 60 pages.
- Agenda. Venezia 1962. Ente Turismo Venezia. A diary with photography by Berengo Gardin; 110 pages.
- CIA. Manifatture del Seveso (in Italian). 1963. Photography by Berengo Gardin; 68 pages.
- Venezia: Venezia e la sua laguna. Attraverso l'Italia (nuova serie) (in Italian). Vol. 11. Milan: Touring Club Italiano. 1963. OCLC 888807584. Photographers include Berengo Gardin, who contributes 1 colour and 18 B/W photographs; introduction by Sergio Bettini; 272 pages. About Venice and its lagoon. (Note: Under the title "libri collectivi", briefly introduced in Bruno Carbone, ed. Gianni Berengo Gardin. Il libro dei libri. Rome: Contrasto Due, 2013. ISBN 978-88-6965-444-2.)
- Venezia. Collana italiana (in Italian). Vol. 1. Milan: Tamburini. 1964. OCLC 22224113. Text by Guido Perocco; 55 pages.
- Veneto. Attraverso l'Italia (nuova serie) (in Italian). Vol. 13. Milan: Touring Club Italiano. 1964. OCLC 491536839. Photographers include Berengo Gardin, who contributes 2 colour and 18 B/W photographs; text by Giuliano Manzutto; edited by Alessandro Cruciani; introduction by Giovanni Comisso; 256 pages. About the Veneto.
- Venise des saisons = Venedig: Stadt auf 118 Inseln
  - Venise des saisons. La Guilde du Livre (in French). Vol. 478. Lausanne: La Guilde du Livre. 1965. OCLC 714942359. Texts by Giorgio Bassani and Mario Soldati; 112 B/W photographs by Berengo Gardin; 194 pages. Ten thousand + 30 copies printed. (Note: Introduced in Bruno Carbone, ed. Gianni Berengo Gardin. Il libro dei libri. Rome: Contrasto Due, 2013. ISBN 978-88-6965-444-2.) Berengo Gardin describes Una storia d'amore: Venezia (1981) Gli anni di Venezia (1994) and Venezia (2004) as new editions of this book.
  - Venise des saisons (in French). Lausanne: Editions Clairefontaine. 1965. OCLC 716024503. 194 pages.
  - Venedig: Stadt auf 118 Inseln (in German). Starnberg: Keller. 1965. OCLC 73754294. Translated from the Italian by Marianne and Josef Keller; 116 pages. (Note: Mentioned in Bruno Carbone, ed. Gianni Berengo Gardin. Il libro dei libri. Rome: Contrasto Due, 2013. ISBN 978-88-6965-444-2.)
- Toscana
  - Toscana: parte prima (in Italian). Milan: Touring Club Italiano. 1966. 159 B/W and 9 colour photographs by Berengo Gardin; other contributions by Josip Ciganovich, Ezio Quiresi, et al.; introduction by Bino Sanminiatelli; 224 pages. About Tuscany.
  - Toscana: parte seconda (in Italian). Milan: Touring Club Italiano. 1966. 159 B/W and 9 colour photographs by Berengo Gardin; other contributions by Josip Ciganovich, Ezio Quiresi, et al.; introduction by Luciano Berti; 224 pages. About the region of Tuscany.
- Pierluca. Venice: Alfieri. 1966. OCLC 279551. In English, French and Italian; edited by Giuseppe Marchiori; 56 pages. About Pierluca.
- Monachesi (in Italian). Venice: Bruno Alfieri. 1966. OCLC 809607537. About Sante Monachesi; photographs by Berengo Gardin and Fulvio Roiter, texts by Alfredo Anitori, Monachesi, et al.; 76 pages.
- Un edificio per la RAI. Roma, Viale Mazzini. Monografie di architettura. Vol. 3. Venice: Bruno Alfieri. 1967. OCLC 3317530. About a building in Rome for the RAI. Photographs by Berengo Gardin, texts in Italian and English by Giuseppe Mazzariol, Francesco Berarducci and Marziano Bernardi; 80 pages.
- Puglia: 336 fotografie, 15 quadricromie fuori testo, 1 carta geografica. Attraverso l'Italia (in Italian). Vol. 17. Milan: Officine Grafiche Vallardi. 1967. OCLC 888807425. Introduction by Giuseppe Cassieri. Edited by Giuliano Manzutto and Alessandro Cruciani; 219 B/W and 8 color photographs by Berengo Gardin, additional photographs by Ezio Quiresi; 256 pages. About the region of Apulia.
- Viaggio in Toscana (in Italian). Florence: Marchi e Bertolli. 1967. OCLC 909693. Texts by Giorgio Soavi and Giuliano Manzutto; 98 black and white photographs; 126 pages. About Tuscany.
  - Toscane. La Guilde du livre (in French). Vol. 763. Lausanne: La Guilde du livre. 1968. OCLC 713884819. 10000+30 copies. French translation by Colette Gardaz. Not sold to the public.
  - Toscane (in French). Lausanne: Editions Clairefontaine. 1968. OCLC 77455454. Trade edition.
- Fabrizio Bruno. Architetture 1960–1967 (in Italian). Venice: Alfieri Edizioni d'Arte. 1967. OCLC 257950284. Text by Giuseppe Mazzariol; 114 pages.
- Lazio: 285 fotografie, 12 quadricromie, 1 carta geografica. Attraverso l'Italia (in Italian). Vol. 18. Milan: Touring Club Italiano. 1967. OCLC 888807439. Edited by Emilio Bianchi and Alessandro Cruciani; introduction by Mario Praz; 89 B/W and 2 colour photographs by Berengo Gardin; 256 pages. About Lazio.
- Liguria (in Italian). Milan: Electa. 1967. OCLC 886384906. Edited by Gian Vittorio Castelnovi, et al.; includes 36 B/W photographs by Berengo Gardin; 492 pages. About Liguria. (Not to be confused with the 1969 book Liguria.)
- Basilicata, Calabria: 271 fotografie, 19 quadricromie, 1 carta geografica. Attraverso l'Italia (in Italian). Vol. 19. Milan: Touring Club Italiano. 1968. OCLC 888807493. Edited by Giuliano Manzutto; introduction by Michele Abbate and Saverio Strati; 193 B/W and 4 colour photographs by Berengo Gardin; 240 pages. About Basilicata and Calabria.
- Trentino, Alto Adige: 244 fotografie, 15 quadricromie, 1 carta geografica. Attraverso l'Italia (in Italian). Vol. 20. Milan: Officine Grafiche Vallardi. 1968. OCLC 888807588. For the Touring Club Italiano. Edited by Emilio Bianchi; 129 B/W and 6 colour photographs by Berengo Gardin; 256 pages. About Trentino–Alto Adige.
- I Cadorin. Florence: Fratelli Alinari. 1968. OCLC 600660289. Photographs by Berengo Gardin, text by Giuseppe Marchiori; 60 pages. About the Cadorin family of architects and artists.
- Galleria privata di Paolo Barbieri: con 4 poesie e numerose pitture dal 1954 al 1968 (in Italian). Venice: Alfieri. 1968. OCLC 886406669. Text by Giuseppe Marchiori; 50 pages.
- Piemonte, Valle d'Aosta. Sèrie delle regioni d'Italia (in Italian). Vol. 5. Milan: Electa. 1968. OCLC 3362883. Includes 42 B/W photographs by Berengo Gardin; text by Giovanni Arpino, Riccardo Bacchelli et al.; 498 pages. Published for Banca Nazionale del Lavoro. About Piedmont and the Aosta valley.
- Canavese (in Italian). Turin: AEDA. 1969. OCLC 5272826. 88 B/W photographs by Berengo Gardin; text by Mario Minardi and Ermanno Franchetto; 156 pages. About Canavese.
- Morire di classe: la condizione manicomiale (in Italian). Turin: Einaudi. 1969. OCLC 464136129. Text by Franco Basaglia and Franca Ongaro Basaglia, photographs by Carla Cerati and 59 by Berengo Gardin. The title means "To die because of your class: The condition of asylums". 10,313 copies published; 8092 copies sold. (See also Morire di classe.)
  - Morire di classe: la condizione manicomiale (in Italian). Turin: Einaudi. 1974. 3958 copies published; 2575 copies sold. (Note: Although Foot says that "Morire di Classe only went through two editions, and was out of print by the early 1980s" and provides the print run for a 1974 edition, he mentions no difference between the two editions (suggesting that they are what are more commonly called printings or impressions), and various WorldCat entries suggest at least one additional "edition" (printing) in the late 1970s.) (Note: See also Per non dimenticare: 1968. La realtà manicomiale di "Morire di classe" (1998).)
  - Morire di classe: la condizione manicomiale (in Italian). Muggia: Duemilauno Agenzia Sociale. 2008. Issue 16 of the journal Sconfinamenti. This is the same as the first edition, with the addition of texts by the sociologist of politics Maria Grazia Giannichedda and the journalist and photographer Claudio Ernè, as well as an editorial note; its publisher makes it available as a PDF file. (Note: The PDF may be found here (Editore Duemilauno Agenzia Sociale).) (Note: See also Manicomi: psichiatria e antipsichiatria nelle immagini degli anni Settanta (2015).)
- Il nuovo impegno (in Italian). Vol. 18. 1969. Catalogue of an exhibition held by Berengo Gardin, Cesare Colombo and Toni Nicolini held at the gallery "Il Diaframma" in Milan in November 1968; 32 pages; with 11 B/W photographs by Berengo Gardin.
- Olivetti Pozzuoli (in Italian). Ivrea: Olivetti. 1969. About the Olivetti plant in Pozzuoli, with 20 photographs by Berengo Gardin and other photographs by Henri Cartier-Bresson; 34 pages.
- Umbria: 279 fotografie, 15 quadricromie, 1 carta geografica. Attraverso l'Italia (nuova serie) (in Italian). Vol. 21. Milano: Touring Club Italiano. 1969. OCLC 888807539. About Umbria; primary photographer Paolo Monti, but also with 60 B/W and 2 colour photographs by Berengo Gardin, and an introduction by Giacomo Prampolini; 256 pages.
- Liguria. Attraverso l'Italia (nuova serie) (in Italian). Vol. 22. Milan: Touring Club Italiano. 1969. OCLC 491537005. Includes 22 B/W photographs by Berengo Gardin; introduction by Carlo Bo; 272 pages. About Liguria. (Not to be confused with the 1967 book Liguria.)

=== 1970s ===
- Album no. 12. Edited by Bill Jay. London: Album, 1970. OCLC 878595550. Much of issue 12 of the photography magazine Album is devoted to Berengo Gardin, Édouard Boubat and Elliott Erwitt. Berengo Gardin has 13 B/W photographs. (Note: A PDF of this issue of Album is available here within Bill Jay's website as archived by the Wayback Machine on 8 July 2011.)
- Ivrea: le città che sono l'Italia. Milan: Electa. 1970. OCLC 5272950. Photography by Berengo Gardin (35 B/W photographs), Mario Mulas and Fulvio Roiter; text Ludovico Zorzi. Text in German, English, French, Italian and Spanish; 205 pages. About Ivrea.
- Immagine di Venezia (in Italian). Milan: Galassia editrice. 1970. OCLC 12824401. 160 B/W photographs by Berengo Gardin; text by Giuseppe Marchiori, Guido Perocco, and Sandro Zanotto; 208 pages. About Venice.
- L'occhio come mestiere: fotografie (in Italian). Milan: Il Diaframma. 1970. OCLC 3411863. 113 B/W photographs by Berengo Gardin, text by Cesare Colombo; 152 pages. Berengo Gardin describes this as the first anthology of a variety of his work.
- Sardegna: 277 fotografie, 14 quadricromie, 1 carta geografica. Attraverso l'Italia (in Italian). Vol. 23. Milan: Touring Club Italiano. 1970. OCLC 888807516. 204 B/W and 3 colour photographs by Berengo Gardin; edited by Giuliano Manzutto; introduction by Giuseppe Fiori; 256 pages. About Sardinia.
- Abruzzo, Molise. Attraverso l'Italia (in Italian). Milan: Touring Club Italiano. 1970. 57 B/W and 1 colour photographs by Berengo Gardin, other contributions by Pepi Merisio, Paolo Monti, and others; introduction by Ettore Paratore; 256 pages. About Abruzzo and Molise.
- Friuli Venezia Giulia: 331 fotografie, 15 quadricromie, 1 carta geografica. Attraverso l'Italia (in Italian). Vol. 26. Milan: Touring Club Italiano. 1971. OCLC 888807529. 246 B/W and 2 colour photographs by Berengo Gardin; other photographs by Elio Ciol and others; introduction by Biagio Marin; edited by Emilio Bianchi and Giuliano Manzutto; 256 pages. About Friuli-Venezia Giulia.
- Polesine (in Italian). Venice: Alfieri. 1971. OCLC 483670398. 263 B/W and 12 colour photographs by Berengo Gardin, text by Giuseppe Marchiori, with an essay by Sandro Zanotto; 54 pages. About Polesine. Some of the material here was reworked into a different book of the same title, published in 2008 (see below).
- Marche. Attraverso l'Italia (in Italian). Milan: Touring Club Italiano. 1971. 68 B/W and 3 colour photographs by Berengo Gardin; other photographs by Paolo Monti and others; introduction by Paolo Volpone; 256 pages. About the Marche.
- Piazze d'Italia. Italia meravigliosa (in Italian). Vol. 1. Milan: Touring Club Italiano. 1971. OCLC 715499736. 160 photographs by Berengo Gardin, other photographs by Pepi Merisio, Paolo Monti, et al.; essays by Cesare Brandi and Franco Mancuso. On the piazze of Italy; 192 pages.
- Lago di Como (in Italian). Como: Ente Provinciale Turismo. 1971. OCLC 82825300. Photography by Berengo Gardin, text by Cesare Rodi, edited by Ente Provinciale Turismo (Como); 30 pages. About Lake Como.
- Milano: 359 fotografie, 19 quadricromie, 1 pianta della città. Attraverso l'Italia (in Italian). Vol. 27. Milan: Touring Club Italiano. 1972. OCLC 888807492. Edited by Giuliano Manzutto and Emilio Bianchi; introduction by Carlo Bo; 240 pages. About Milan.
- Fattorie d'Europa. Un racconto fotografico (in Italian). Novara: Istituto geografico De Agostini. 1973. OCLC 5963262. 211 colour photographs by Berengo Gardin, commentary by Giovanni Arpino; 227 pages. About the farmhouses of Europe.
  - Fermes d'Europe (in French). Novara: Istituto geografico De Agostini. 1973. OCLC 465223779. 227 pages.
  - Farms of Europe. Novara: Istituto geografico De Agostini. 1973. OCLC 500283591.
  - Fincas de Europe (in Spanish). Novara: Istituto geografico De Agostini. 1973.
- Abbazie e conventi. Italia meravigliosa (in Italian). Vol. 3. Milan: Touring Club Italiano. 1973. OCLC 610715489. 90 B/W photographs by Berengo Gardin, essay by Giuseppe Zander, introduction by Giovanni Fallani; 192 pages. About abbeys and convents.
- Spagna. Attraverso l'Europa (in Italian). Milan: Touring Club Italiano. 1973. OCLC 797234529. Text by Giovanni Arpino, 270 B/W and 16 colour photographs by Berengo Gardin; 290 pages. About Spain.
  - Espagne = Spanje. Voyage Touring-Club = Touring Club Reizen. 1983. In Dutch and French.
- Catalogo Bolaffi dei naïfs italiani (in Italian). Turin: Giulio Bolaffi. 1973. OCLC 640155020. Photography by Berengo Gardin and texts by Antonio Amaduzzi and Cesare Zavattini; 150 pages.
- Catalogo nazionale Bolaffi dei naïfs italiani n. 2 (in Italian). Turin: Giulio Bolaffi. 1974. Photography by Berengo Gardin and texts by Antonio Amaduzzi and Cesare Zavattini; 150 pages.
- Qui Mosca. Grandi città del mondo (in Italian). Milan: Touring Club Italiano. 1974. OCLC 635553536. Text by Enzo Bettiza, 46 B/W photographs by Berengo Gardin; color photography by Novosti Press Agency; 64 pages. About Moscow.
- Tempo veneziano (in Italian). Genoa: Arti Grafiche Amilcare Pizzi – Italsider. 1974. OCLC 17604831. 110 B/W and 22 colour photographs by Berengo Gardin, texts by Diego Valeri, etchings by Michele Marieschi; 116 pages. About Venice. Edition of 3500, not sold to the public.
- Castelli e fortificazioni. Italia meravigliosa (in Italian). Vol. 4. Milan: Touring Club Italiano. 1974. OCLC 2010338. Introduction by Italo Calvino, essay by Antonio Cassi Ramelli, edited by Aurelio Natali, 179 B/W photographs by Berengo Gardin; 224 pages.
- I legni di Vallazza = Die Holzplastiken des Vallazza. Venice: Stamperia di Venezia. 1974. OCLC 634118028. Photography by Berengo Gardin and texts by Giuseppe Marchiori; 96 pages. On the wood sculpture of the Vallazza family.
- Francia. Attraverso l'Europa (in Italian). Milan: Touring Club Italiano. 1975. OCLC 797234502. Edited by Emilio Bianchi and Aurelio Natali; introduction by Mario Bonfantini; 251 B/W photographs by Berengo Gardin, 16 colour aerial photographs by Alain Perceval; 288 pages. About France.
- Monachesi (in Italian). Polenza-Macerata: La nuova Foglio. 1975. OCLC 3185904. By Sante Monachesi, Emilio Villa, Elverio Maurizi, Anna Caterina Toni; photographs by Augusto Bellavita, Berengo Gardin, and Fulvio Roiter; edited by Magdalo Mussio; 105 pages.
- Vedova (in Italian). Turin: Toso. 1975. OCLC 849136694. Photography by Berengo Gardin, Giuseppe Bruno and others; 100 pages. About Emilio Vedova.
- Grecia. Attraverso l'Europa (in Italian). Milan: Touring Club Italiano. 1976. OCLC 797234436. 197 B/W and 20 colour photographs by Berengo Gardin; edited by Aurelio Natali. About Greece.
- Tevere (in Italian). Milan: Dalmine. 1976. OCLC 5142790. 124 B/W and 47 colour photographs by Berengo Gardin; text by Giovanni Giudici On the Tiber.
- Un paese vent'anni dopo. Einaudi letteratura (in Italian). Vol. 50. Turin: Einaudi. 1976. OCLC 2964972. Text by Cesare Zavattini and 147 B/W photographs by Berengo Gardin; 175 pages. Revisiting the places in and near Luzzara photographed by Paul Strand in Strand's book Un Paese, twenty years later.
  - Un paese vent'anni dopo (in Italian). Milan: Federico Motta. 2002. ISBN 978-88-7179-337-5.
- Il paradiso di Rabuzin (in Italian). Milan: Tega. 1976. OCLC 635593191. Text by Giancarlo Vigorelli; 8 B/W and 39 colour photographs by Berengo Gardin. About Ivan Rabuzin. (Note: CiNii also shows a Ukrainian-language edition, romanized title Rabuzinov raj, published by Tega in 1977: CiNii record.)
  - Le Paradis de Rabuzin (in French). Milan: Tega. 1976. OCLC 883682285.
- Dentro le case (in Italian). Milan: Electa. 1977. OCLC 639003521. 269 B/W photographs by Berengo Gardin and Luciano D'Alessandro; contributions by Cesare Zavattini, Giuseppe Alario, and Pasquale Carbonara; 263 pages. Published for Società Generale Immobiliare – Sogene in 1977 and as a trade edition one year later. Berengo Gardin photographed Italy from Rome northwards, D'Alessandro from Rome southwards.
- E in Italia vanne (in Italian). Poggibonsi: Antonio Lalli. 1977. OCLC 800967737. 36 B/W photographs by Berengo Gardin, text by Ezio Bacino; 298 pages.
- Gran Bretagna. Attraverso l'Europa (in Italian). Milan: Touring Club Italiano. 1978. OCLC 797234452. 272 B/W and 17 colour photographs of Britain by Berengo Gardin; introduction by Alberto Moravia; 288 pages.
- Viaggio in Gran Bretagna (in Italian). Milan: Editphoto. OCLC 6278019. Supplement of Fotografia italiana no. 234, February 1978. 42 B/W photographs of Britain by Berengo Gardin, edited and with an interview by Gabriele Basilico; 32 pages.
- Dentro il lavoro (in Italian). Milan: Electa. 1978. OCLC 868703230. About workers. Photographs by Berengo Gardin and Luciano D'Alessandro; preface by Cesare Zavattini; contributions by Bruno Corà and Gianni Giannotti; 290 pages. Published for Società Generale Immobiliare – Sogene in 1978 and as a trade edition one year later. Berengo Gardin photographed Italy from Rome northwards, D'Alessandro from Rome southwards.
- Eliolona: Household textiles, furnishing and printed in Italy. Milan: Gally & Thierry. 1978. Photographs by Berengo Gardin; 52 pages.
- Case contadini. Italia meravigliosa (in Italian). Vol. 9. Milan: Touring Club Italiano. 1979. OCLC 602187780. 251 B/W and 50 colour photographs by Berengo Gardin; text by Giacomo Corna Pellegrini et al.; 208 pages. About farmhouses.
- Viaggio dalla Sicilia al continente, 1955–1980. Collana Documenti (in Italian). Vol. 3. Milan: C.S.A.P.P. 1978. OCLC 7740668. About emigration from Sicily to the mainland. By Francesco Saba Sardi, with 17 B/W photographs by Berengo Gardin as well as photographs by Luigi Ciminaghi, A. Benedetto Greco and Uliano Lucas; 93 pages.
- I golfi del silenzio. Iconografie funerarie e cimiteri d'Italia (in Italian). Poggibonsi: Antonio Lalli. 1979. OCLC 6358671. Photographs by Berengo Gardin (81 B/W) and others, text by Ezio Bacino; 168 pages. On funerary and cemetery architecture in Italy.
- Progresso fotografico (in Italian). OCLC 6325586. The May 1979 issue is a Berengo Gardin special; pages 15 to 61 are devoted to him.

=== 1980s ===
- Antico è bello: il recupero della città. Grandi opere (in Italian). Rome: Laterza. 1980. OCLC 8033565. Text by Renzo Piano, Magda Arduino and Mario Fazio; 188 B/W photographs by Berengo Gardin; 256 pages.
- India dei villaggi (in Italian). Como: Edizioni FotoSelex. 1981. OCLC 7946432. Photographs (300 B/W, 38 colour) by Berengo Gardin; text by Antonio Monroy; 162 pages. About the villages of India.
- Gianni Berengo Gardin. Electa Editrice portfolios. Milan: Electa. 1980. OCLC 797763038. A portfolio. Edition of 1000.
- Spazi dell'uomo. Collana Grandangolo (in Italian). Vol. 18. Ivrea: Priuli & Verlucca. 1980. Photographs by Berengo Gardin, text by Paola Mazzarelli; 47 B/W plates plus 17 additional pages.
- Incontro con Gianni Berengo Gardin (in Italian). Modena: Circolo fotografico modenese. 1980. OCLC 83681156. 32 pages.
- Iugoslavia. Attraverso l'Europa (in Italian). Milan: Touring Club Italiano. 1981. OCLC 799995469. 187 B/W and 12 colour photographs by Berengo Gardin, introduction by Giorgio Bocca; 232 pages. About Yugoslavia.
- Una storia d'amore, Venezia (in Italian). Veniano: FotoSelex. 1981. OCLC 9153381. 132 B/W photographs by Berengo Gardin, stories by Giorgio Soavi; 131 pages. Berengo Gardin describes this as one of several new editions of Venise des saisons (1965).
- Cagliari, Marina: memorie ed immagini per un recupero del vecchio quartiere (in Italian). Milan: Electa. 1981. OCLC 9897288. Edited by Antonio Romagnino, 96 B/W photographs by Berengo Gardin, with a text by Magda Arduino; 147 pages. About Marina in Cagliari.
- La Sardegna: con 93 illustrazioni. Itinerari de l'Espresso (in Italian). Vol. 16. Rome: Ed. l'Espresso. 1981. OCLC 888682201. Photographs by Berengo Gardin, text by Giusa Marcialis; 207 pages. About Sardinia.
- Napoli '81. Sette fotografi per una nuova immagine (in Italian). Milan: Electa. 1981. OCLC 9760864. 15 B/W photographs by Berengo Gardin; other photographs by Mario Cresci, Roberto Salbitani, Franco Fontana, Luigi Ghirri, Mimmo Jodice, and Antonia Mulas; 120 pages. Catalogue of an exhibition held in Naples, December 1981 – January 1982. About Naples.
- Acciaierie di Piombino: continuità di un'esperienza industriale. [Livorno]: [Belforte]. 1981. 39 B/W photographs by Berengo Gardin, text by Arrigo Benedetti and Franco Bonelli; 110 pages. For and about the Piombino-based company Acciaierie di Piombino.
- G. Berengo Gardin. Grandi fotografi (in Italian). Vol. 23. Milan: Gruppo Editoriale Fabbri. 1982. OCLC 79409115. 47 B/W photographs by Berengo Gardin; with contributions by Giovanni Chiaramonte, Attilio Colombo and Maurizio Capobussi; 64 pages.
  - G. Berengo Gardin. Los Grandes fotógrafos (in Spanish). Vol. 13. Barcelona: Orbis. 1983. ISBN 84-7530-189-4, ISBN 84-7530-188-6; 60 pages.
- Finlandia, Norvegia, Svezia. Attraverso l'Europa (in Italian). Milan: Touring Club Italiano. 1982. OCLC 10948151. 162 B/W and 25 colour photographs by Berengo Gardin, text by Lalla Romano and Cesare de Seta; 231 pages. On Finland, Norway and Sweden.
- L'Italia, uomine e territorio. L'Italia centrale (in Italian). Novara: Banca Populare di Novara. 1982. 67 B/W photographs by Berengo Gardin; edited by Eugenio Turri; 392 pages. About central Italy.
- SanFranciscoVenezia. Immagini di due città. Venice: Scuola Grande dei Carmini. 1982. OCLC 878558548. 10 B/W photographs by Berengo Gardin; others by other photographers; text in Italian and English; 108 pages. About San Francisco and Venice.
- Archeologia industriale: monumenti del lavoro fra XVIII e XX secolo. Italia meravigliosa (in Italian). Milan: Touring Club Italiano. 1983. OCLC 4950482843. 205 colour photographs by Berengo Gardin; contributions by Antonello Negri, Cesare de Seta, Mila Leva Pistoi, Pietro Cordara, Leonardo Di Mauro, Maria Flora Giubilei, Patrizia Chierici, and others. About the industrial archaeology of Italy.
- Germania: Repubblica federale e Berlino. Attraverso l'Europa (in Italian). Milan: Touring Club Italiano. 1983. OCLC 797199997. 152 B/W and 51 colour photographs by Berengo Gardin, essays by Enrico Filippini; 272 pages. About West Germany and Berlin.
- Storia di una mostra Torino 1983 (in Italian). Turin: Toro Assicurazioni. 1983. OCLC 255799449. 34 colour photographs by Berengo Gardin, texts by Pier Paolo Bendetto and Massimo Dimi; 123 pages.
- Italy: A guide for businessmen and investors (in Italian). Milan: Coopers & Librand. 1983. OCLC 65782889. 35 colour photographs by Berengo Gardin; 52 pages. And later editions.
- Renzo Piano. Progetti e architetture 1964–1983. Architettura, i contemporanei (in Italian). Milan: Electa. 1983. Photographs by Berengo Gardin, edited by Massimo Dimi; 246 pages. About the architecture of Renzo Piano. ISBN 88-435-0921-7; ISBN 88-435-1987-5.
  - Renzo Piano: Projects and buildings 1964–1983. Architectural Documents. New York: Electa/Rizzoli. 1983. ISBN 978-0-8478-0513-6.
- Lo spazio rubato. Architettura e fotografie (in Italian). Milan: Unicopli. 1983. ISBN 978-88-7061-745-0. Berengo Gardin is one of 11 photographers collected here; edited by Raffaello Cecchi; 132 pages.
- Exhibit (in Italian). Milan: IBM Italia. 1984. 35 B/W photographs by Berengo Gardin; 160 pages. Accompanying a travelling exhibition by IBM Italia.
- Aldo Amaduzzi: parole e immagini per un pittore (in Italian). Milan: Mazzotta. 1984. OCLC 886950827. 22 B/W photographs by Berengo Gardin; edited by Antonio Amaduzzi and Berengo Gardin; 112 pages. About the painter Aldo Amaduzzi.
- Paesaggio veneto (in Italian). Cinisello Balsamo: Almicare Pizzi per la Giunta Regionale del Veneto. 1984. ISBN 978-88-366-0055-7. 15 B/W photographs by Berengo Gardin, others by other photographers; edited by Bruno Dolcetta; 220 pages.
- Il grande libro del Veneto. I grandi libri delle regioni d'Italia (in Italian). Milan: Mondadori. 1985. OCLC 797442729. About the Veneto. Edited by Enrico Sturani, texts by Goffredo Parise, Mario Rigoni Stern and Giuliano Riavez; 4 B/W and 51 colour photographs by Berengo Gardin; 188 pages. A school book.
- I percorsi dei navigli. Milan: Comune di Milano. 1984. 61 B/W photographs by Berengo Gardin, others by Toni Nicolini; text in Italian and English by Carlo Tognoli, edited by Rossella Bigi; 136 pages. Along canals.
- Fotografie di Gianni Berengo Gardin per Il Mondo dal 1954 al 1965. Mazzotta/fotografia (in Italian). Milan: Mazzotta. 1985. ISBN 978-88-202-0598-0. 99 photographs by Berengo Gardin for Il Mondo; 108 pages. Preface by Carlo Tognoli. Catalogue of an exhibition held in Palazzo Dugani, Milan, January–February 1985. (The title can also be read as Il Mondo.)
- La grande fiera 1985. Milan: Fiera Milano. 1985. OCLC 15628814. 77 B/W photographs by Berengo Gardin, seven colour photographs by Gabriele Basilico; texts (in Italian and English) by Gianni Roggini, Giovanna Calvenzi, and Cesare Colombo; 112 pages. About Fiera internazionale di Milano.
- Paesaggio urbano (in Italian). Crema: Comune di Crema. 1985. OCLC 635626825. Photographs by Enzo Bassotto, Berengo Gardin, Ken Damy and Franco Fontana; texts by Giuliana Scimè and Giampaolo Ferrari; 47 pages.
- Quel passar l'Adda: vita arte e lavoro lungo il corso dell'Adda (in Italian). Milan: Aem, Azienda energetica municipale. 1985. OCLC 878737935. Texts by Luigi Santucci et al.; photographs by Berengo Gardin (14 B/W) et al.; 167 pages. On the arts and labour along the Adda.
- La casa e il contadino = The peasant and his home. Bologna: Edagricole. 1985. OCLC 13947066. In Italian and English; text by Alberto Fumagalli; photographs by Berengo Gardin (35 B/W), Francesco Radino, Fumagalli and others; 137 pages. Not sold to the public.
- Visages, paysages: hier et aujourd'hui (in French). Milan: Electa. 1985. OCLC 467894624. Ten B/W photographs by Berengo Gardin; also photographs by other photographers; edited by Italo Zannier; 147 pages. Accompanying an exhibition about Trieste, Trouver Trieste (sponsored by the city of Trieste and Institut culturel italien de Paris / Istituto italiano di cultura di Parigi), held at the Eiffel Tower from November 1985 to June 1986.
- Il grande libro della Toscana (in Italian). Milan: Mondadori. 1986. OCLC 165882426. Edited by Enrico Sturani, text by Mario Tobino, Salvatore Tarallo, and Chiara Terrachiano; six B/W and 130 colour photographs by Berengo Gardin. About Tuscany; 178 pages. A school book.
- I soldi in testa. Milan: Banca Mercantile Italiana. 1986. 77 B/W photographs by Berengo Gardin, 36 pages of text by Giampaolo Pansa; 118 pages. Edition of 1500. A book about the stock exchange, banks and finance, made for the Florence-based Banca Mercantile Italiana.
- Acciaierie di Piombino. Piombino: Acciaierie di Piombino. 1986. 39 B/W photographs by Berengo Gardin, text by Arrigo Benedetti and Franco Bonelli; 110 pages. For and about the Piombino-based company Acciaierie di Piombino.
- Roma. Attraverso l'Italia. (in Italian). Milan: Touring Club Italiano. 1986. ISBN 978-88-365-0284-4. About Rome; 225 colour photographs by Berengo Gardin; 320 pages.
  - Rom. Unterwegs in Italien (in German). Bern: Kümmerly und Frey. 1986. ISBN 978-3-259-08750-3. 312 pages.
- E se cent'anni vi sembran pochi: tre fotografi per la Lega delle Cooperative (in Italian). Bologna: Il Lavoro. 1986. ISBN 978-88-7663-066-8. Photographs by Berengo Gardin, Enzo Carli and Raffaello Scatasta.
- Dorsoduro – Giudecca. Guida alla città di Venezia: la luce, l'acqua (in Italian). Vol. 1. Venice: Edizioni l'Altra Riva. 1986. ISBN 978-88-7662-017-1. LCCN 90165744. Photographs by Berengo Gardin, text by Ugo Pizzarello and Ester Capitanio. On Dorsoduro and Giudecca.
- Vivere sempre (in Italian). Milan: Farmitalia Carlo Erba. 1986. 15 B/W photographs by Berengo Gardin, other photographs by Giovanna Nuvoletti and Rossana Bossaglia; text by Giovanni Arpino, Enzo Bettiza and Rossana Bossaglia; 80 pages. Not sold to the public.
- Energia a Milano (in Italian). Milan: AEM, Azienda energetica municipale. 1986. OCLC 636040124. 16 B/W photographs by Berengo Gardin; other photographs by Gabriele Basilico and Francesco Radino; texts by Daniele Baroni, Giorgio Schultze, Giancarlo Giambelli et al.; 158 pages. Edition of 3000, not sold to the public. About energy in Milan.
- Fortezze gotiche e lune elettriche: le centrali idroelettriche della AEM in Valtellina (in Italian). Milan: AEM, Azienda energetica municipale. 1986. 22 B/W photographs by Berengo Gardin; other photographs by Gabriele Basilico and Francesco Radino; texts by Daniele Baroni, Giovanni Bettini, Aldo Castellano, et al.; 160 pages. Not sold to the public.
- Scanno: un paese che non cambia (in Italian). Appiano Gentile, Como: Massimo Baldini. 1987. OCLC 79409112. 109 B/W photographs by Berengo Gardin; 128 pages; about Scanno, Abruzzo.
- L'agricoltura nell'area metropolitana milanese (in Italian). Milan: Provincia di Milano. 1987. 84 B/W photographs by Berengo Gardin; other photographs by Rossella Bigi; 140 pages; about agriculture in the Milan area.
- Obiettivo Italia (in Italian). Vercelli: White Star. 1987. OCLC 876637289. Texts by Giovanni Arpino and Bruno Quaranta; photographs by Berengo Gardin and others; 238 pages.
- Renzo Piano: The process of architecture. London: 9H Gallery. 1987. OCLC 636944911. From the OCLC record: "This catalogue has been publ. to coincide with the exhibition 'Renzo Piano: the process of architecture' held at the 9H Gallery, London, from 16 January to 15 February 1987"; 20 pages. On the architecture of Renzo Piano.
- Photographies 1954–1987: Rencontres internationales de la photographie: Arles, 4 juillet – 15 août 1987 (in French). Arles: Rencontres Internationales de la Photographie. 1987. OCLC 830656438. Accompanying an exhibition at Rencontres internationales de la photographie d'Arles, July–August 1987. 21 B/W photographs by Berengo Gardin; text by Guy Mandery; 54 pages.
- Apulien: Trulli und staufisches Erbe (in German). Bern: Kümmerly und Frey. 1987. ISBN 978-3-259-08753-4. Text by Maria Raffaella Fiory Ceccopieri.
- Santa Croce – San Polo, città di mercanti. Guida alla città di Venezia: la luce, l'acqua (in Italian). Vol. 2. Venice: Edizioni l'Altra Riva. 1987. Photographs by Berengo Gardin, text by Ugo Pizzarello and Ester Capitanio. ISBN 88-7662-017-6; ISBN 88-7662-027-3; 317 pages. On Santa Croce and San Polo.
- Donne, fotografie degli anni cinquanta (in Italian). Rome: Janssen. 1987. 29 B/W photographs by Berengo Gardin. (Note: Published by Peliti Associati for Janssen Farmaceutici.) Photographs from the 1950s of women.
- Donne, fotografie degli anni sessanta (in Italian). Rome: Peliti Associati. 1987. 29 B/W photographs by Berengo Gardin. Photographs from the 1960s of women.
- Donne, fotografie degli anni settanta (in Italian). Rome: Peliti Associati. 1987. 29 B/W photographs by Berengo Gardin. Photographs from the 1970s of women.
- Neorealismo e fotografia. Il gruppo friulano per una nuova fotografia, 1955–1965 (in Italian). Udine: Art&. 1987. ISBN 978-88-85893-01-6. 12 B/W photographs by Berengo Gardin; other photographs by Aldo Beltrame, Carlo Bevilacqua, Gianni Borghesan, Giuseppe Bruno, Toni Del Tin, Luciano Ferri, Nino Migliori, Giovanni Nogaro, Fulvio Roiter, Riccardo Toffoletti and Italo Zannier; edited by Italo Zannier; 186 pages.
- I fotografi e l'industria. Rassegna di fotografia industriale. Biblioteca Cedis Editrice: mostre; Immagini e riflessioni (in Italian). Vol. 2. Rome: Sedis. 1988. OCLC 888652156. By Associazione Sindicale Intersind; texts by Agostino Pace and Italo Zannier; 16 B/W photographs by Berengo Gardin; 176 pages. Catalogue of an exhibition held in San Michele a Ripa, Rome in January 1989.
- Gianni Berengo Gardin: fotografo 1953–1988 (in Italian). Udine: Art&. 1988. ISBN 978-88-85893-03-0. Edited by Romeo Martinez, texts by Giovanni Chiaramonte and Italo Zannier, photographs by Berengo Gardin; 346 pages.
  - Gianni Berengo Gardin: fotografie 1953–1990 (in Italian). Udine: Art&. 1990. ISBN 978-88-85893-23-8. 348 pages. (Note the change of title.)
- Giardini segreti a Venezia (in Italian). Venice: Arsenale. 1988. ISBN 978-88-7743-043-4. Texts by Cristiana Moldi-Ravenna and Teodora Sammartini; preface by Vittorio Fagone; 102 color photographs by Berengo Gardin; 168 pages. And later editions.
  - Die geheimen Gärten Venedigs (in German). Munich: Diederichs. 1989. ISBN 978-3-424-00992-7. And at least one later edition.
  - Secret gardens in Venice. Venice: Arsenale. 1988. ISBN 978-88-7743-169-1. And at least one later edition.
- Le isole della laguna di Venezia: un universo inesplorato. Guida alla città di Venezia: la luce, l'acqua (in Italian). Vol. 5. Venice: Edizioni l'Altra Riva. 1988. ISBN 978-88-7662-019-5. 162 colour and 32 B/W photographs by Berengo Gardin, text by Tudy Sammartini, Paolo Barbaro, Giovanni Caniato et al. 310 pages. On the smaller islands of the Venetian lagoon.
- IBM in Europe, the Middle East and Africa in 1988. Paris: IBM. 1988. 162 colour and 32 B/W photographs by Berengo Gardin; texts by Lynn Heigl and David Freeman; 104 pages. About IBM's major European customers.
- Stazione di notte. Maestri italiani di fotografia (in Italian). Cologne: Istituto italiano di cultura. 1988. OCLC 836419300. 30 B/W photographs by Berengo Gardin; text by Augusto G. Bertolini; 36 pages. Published in collaboration with Kodak Italia for Photokina 1988. About rail stations at night. The front cover reads "G. Berengo Gardin". One of a set of three volumes, the others by Ferdinando Scianna and Franco Fontana.
- Tra città e città: Cinisello Balsamo (in Italian). Cinisello Balsamo: Comune di Cinisello Balsamo. 1988. 72 B/W photographs by Berengo Gardin; text by Arturo Carlo Quintavalle and Cesare Stevan; 204 pages. Not sold to the public. About Cinisello Balsamo.
- Le isole del tesoro. Proposte per la riscoperta e la gestione delle risorse culturali (in Italian). Milan: Electa. 1988. OCLC 802611279. Texts by Umberto Eco, Federico Zeri, Renzo Piano and Augusto Graziani; contributions by Omar Calabrese and Carlo Bertelli; 76 B/W and 2 colour photographs by Berengo Gardin; also photographs by others. Published by and for IBM; not sold to the public.
- L'Italia di Repubblica (in Italian). Milan: A. Manzoni. 1988. 12 B/W photographs by Berengo Gardin; other photographs by Gianni Giansanti, Roberto Koch, Uliano Lucas, and John Vink; 80 pages.
- Tipografia: immagini quotidiane (in Italian). Rome: Peliti Associati. 1989. ISBN 978-88-85121-04-1. 84 B/W photographs by Berengo Gardin, text by Alfred Hohenegger and Marina Miraglia; 90 pages. About typography. About the printing company run by the parents of the publisher, Mario Peliti, which was about to close.
- Un pacco venuto da lontano (in Italian). Milan: Domenichelli. 1989. 124 B/W photographs by Berengo Gardin, text by Domenico Porzio, edited by Enzio Vigliani; 90 pages. About the lives of the drivers for the Domenichelli courier company.
- Comunque Italia (in Italian). Rome: Peliti Associati. 1989. ISBN 978-88-85121-05-8. Presentation by Federico Zeri. 87 colour photographs by Berengo Gardin; 124 pages. A portrait of Italy in colour.
- Palazzo Marino: Milano e il volto del suo governo (in Italian). Milan: Comune di Milano. 1989. OCLC 878579104. 68 B/W photographs by Berengo Gardin; other photographs by Rossella Bigi and Giovanni Chiaramonte; text by Guido Vergani; 179 pages. About Palazzo Marino.
- Karin B (in Italian). Ferrara: USL di Ferrara. 1989. Photographs by Berengo Gardin, concept and text by Eliseo Fava, graphic design by Ferruccio Dragoni; 34 pages.
- Donne: fotografie di quarant'anni (in Italian). Rome: Peliti Associati. 1989. ISBN 978-88-85121-02-7. 112 B/W photographs of women by Berengo Gardin, edited by Giorgio Soavi. Catalogue of an exhibition held in Rome in 1989.
- Cannaregio – Castello, potenza marittima. Guida alla città di Venezia: la luce, l'acqua (in Italian). Vol. 3. Venice: Edizioni l'Altra Riva. 1989. ISBN 978-88-7662-027-0. Photographs by Berengo Gardin, text by Ugo Pizzarello and Ester Capitanio. 304 pages. On Cannaregio and Castello.

=== 1990s ===
- Acqua e agricoltura: conferenza provinciale dell'agricoltura: Milano, 2 dicembre 1988, Palazzo Isimbardi (in Italian). Milan: Provincia di Milano. 1990. OCLC 889448271. 67 B/W photographs by Berengo Gardin, other photographs by Rossella Bigi; 238 pages.
- San Marco: città stato. Guida alla città di Venezia: la luce, l'acqua (in Italian). Vol. 4. Venice: Edizioni l'Altra Riva. 1990. ISBN 978-88-7662-035-5. Photographs by Berengo Gardin, text by Ugo Pizzarello and Ester Capitanio. 285 pages. On San Marco.
- Il gruppo Olivetti. Bilancio consolidato 1990 (in Italian). Olivetti. 1990. 46 colour and 29 B/W photographs by Berengo Gardin; 114 pages. About Olivetti.
- Officine grafiche De Agostini (in Italian). Milan: De Agostini. 1990. 34 photographs (B/W and colour) by Berengo Gardin; pages not numbered. About De Agostini.
- Legatorio del Verbano (in Italian). Milan: De Agostini. 1990. 34 photographs (B/W and colour) by Berengo Gardin; pages not numbered.
- Essere Fotografia, August 1990. Pages 16–40 are devoted to Berengo Gardin.
- Sei per l'Umbria. Itinerari fotografici nella regione (in Italian). Foligno: CO.GRA.FO. 1990. Photography by Berengo Gardin, Cesare Colombo, Mario Cresci, Mimmo Jodice, Toni Nicolini, George Tatge. Catalogue of an exhibition held at Foligno.
- Cesare Zavattini (in Italian). Milan: Franco Sciardelli. 1991. OCLC 33966307. 24 B/W photographs by Berengo Gardin, text by Lorenzo Pellizzari; 66 pages. About Cesare Zavattini and his life in Luzzara.
- In treno attraverso l'Italia (in Italian). Rome: Peliti Associati. 1991. ISBN 978-88-85121-08-9. 45 B/W photographs by Berengo Gardin; other photographs by Roberto Koch and Ferdinando Scianna; texts by Marco Sorteni, Goffredo Fofi and Sebastiano Addamo; edited by Irene Bignardi; 207 pages. About train journeys across Italy.
- Autostrada: una realtà italiana (in Italian). Milan: Aiscat. 1991. Photographs by Berengo Gardin; text by Luca Goldoni and Ernesto Robotti; 142 pages. About the autostrade of Italy.
- Corso di fotografia. Gianni Berengo Gardin. Supplement to Tutti fotografi, November 1992. 53 B/W photographs by Berengo Gardin; 32 pages.
- Il Monumentale di Milano: il primo cimitero della libertà 1866–1992 (in Italian). Milan: Electa. 1992. ISBN 978-88-435-4248-2. Photographs by Berengo Gardin, edited by Michele Petrantoni; 385 pages. About Cimitero Monumentale of Milan.
- Viva gli sposi: come ci si sposa oggi in Italia secondo il conduttore della trasmissione televisiva "Scene da un matrimonio" (in Italian). Milan: Mondadori. 1992. ISBN 978-88-04-36391-0. Text by Davide Mengacci, 28 B/W photographs by Berengo Gardin, 162 pages. About the television programme Scene da un matrimonio.
- Procter & Gamble Italia (in Italian). Procter & Gamble Italia. 1992. 10 B/W photographs by Berengo Gardin, 100 pages. About Procter & Gamble Italia.
- Storyboard: immagini quotidiane della Procter & Gamble Italia (in Italian). Rome: Peliti Associati. 1993. ISBN 978-88-85121-16-4. 67 B/W photographs by Berengo Gardin, 100 pages. About Procter & Gamble Italia.
- Lo studio di Giorgio Morandi (in Italian). Milan: Charta. 1993. ISBN 978-88-86158-38-1. 61 B/W photographs by Berengo Gardin; 79 pages. About the studio of Giorgio Morandi, which was about to be dismantled; published on the occasion of the opening of Museo Morandi, Bologna, 4 October 1993.
- Renzo Piano: Building Workshop. London: Phaidon. 1993. 150 B/W photographs by Berengo Gardin; text by Peter Buchanan; 240 pages. On the works of Renzo Piano.
- Il giardino del tempo (in Italian). Rome: Peliti Associati. 1993. ISBN 978-88-85121-18-8. 28 B/W photographs by Berengo Gardin; other photographs by Gabriella Nessi Parlato; texts by Guido Ceronetti, Susanna Berengo Gardin and Emilio Mazza; 103 pages. About the Monumental Cemetery of Staglieno.
- Gli anni di Venezia. Motta fotografia (in Italian). Milan: Federico Motta Editore. 1994. ISBN 978-88-7179-096-1. 37 B/W photographs by Berengo Gardin, texts by Iosif Brodskij; 69 pages. Berengo Gardin describes this as one of several new editions of Venise des saisons (1965).
- La disperata allegria: vivere da zingari a Firenze. Florence: Centro Di. 1994. ISBN 978-88-7038-260-0. 152 B/W photographs by Berengo Gardin; introduction by Günter Grass in Italian and Romani; text in Italian and English by Stefano Francolini, Bianca La Penna and Margherita Pia Francolini; edited by Gabriella Nessi Parlato; 174 pages; published for the exhibition Gianni Berengo Gardin, un Nomade Fotografo, held at Giardino delle Oblate, Florence, in October 1994. About Romani people in Florence.
- Gardin, Gianni Berengo; Basilico, Gabriele; Mormorio, Diego; Spila, Piero (1994). Scambi (in Italian). Rome. ISBN 978-88-85121-20-1. Published by Ferrovie dello Stato and Peliti Associati. Photographs by Berengo Gardin and Gabriele Basilico; texts by Piero Spila and Diego Mormorio; 121 pages. Published on the occasion of the exhibition Ring, Galleria d'arte moderna, Bologna, 1994.
- I medici de Alberobello (in Italian). Alberobello: Associazione Culturale Nicéphore Niépce. 1994. Photographs by Berengo Gardin, Gabriella Nessa Parlato, Makis Vovlas, Cosmo Laera; text by Giovanna Calvenzi.
- L'Aquila. Saggi e documenti. L'Aquila: Istituto cinematografico de l'Aquila. 1995. OCLC 264783116. 204 B/W photographs by Berengo Gardin; with a contribution by Rossella Bigi and texts by Romolo Continenza and Aldo Benedetti; in Italian and English; 13 pages plus 202 photographs. About L'Aquila.
- Il parco di Taino: Giò Pomodoro. Florence: Artificio. 1995. ISBN 978-88-86488-04-4. 63 B/W photographs by Berengo Gardin, in Italian and English; 120 pages. About sculptures by Giò Pomodoro.
- Gianni Berengo Gardin: immagini inedite 1954–1994. Edizioni del Museo. Vol. 8. Brescia: Edizioni del Museo Ken Damy. 1995. OCLC 34802236. 50 B/W previously unpublished photographs by Berengo Gardin; text in Italian, French and English by Charles-Henri Favrod, preface by Ken Damy; 68 pages.
- Pietre nude: l'Italia dell'architettura spontanea in pietra a secco. Parchi della memoria (in Italian). Pescara: Carsa. 1995. ISBN 978-88-85854-31-4. Text by Alfonso Alessandrini, Ennio De Concini, Edoardo Micati; photographs by Berengo Gardin; 107 pages. About dry stone building in Italy.
- Artelaguna '95: opere d'arte per la laguna di Venezia. Venice: Marsilio. 1995. ISBN 978-88-317-6284-7. Photographs by Berengo Gardin, edited by Cristiana Moldi Ravenna; in Italian and English; 98 pages. According to the OCLC entry, "Catalog of an exhibition held near the islands of San Giorgio Maggiore, San Servolo, and San Lazzaro degli Armeni, Venice, June 8 – July 31, 1995. 'Cascina Stal Vitale'". Subtitle means "Works of art for the Venetian lagoon".
- Gianni Berengo Gardin (in Italian). Ischia: Foro d'Ischia Galleria delle stampe antiche. 1995. 16 photographs by Berengo Gardin, 12 pages.
- Fotografi del Touring Club Italiano (in Italian). Milan: Touring Club Italiano. 1995. 17 B/W and 2 colour photographs by Berengo Gardin; other photographs by other photographers; 200 pages.
- Obiettivo famiglia: famiglie viste da Gianni Berengo Gardin, Antonio Biasiucci, Uliano Lucas, Gabriella Nessi Parlato, Franco Pinna, Ivo Saglietti, Francesco Zizola (in Italian). Turin: Gruppo Abele. 1995. ISBN 978-88-7670-237-2. 8 B/W photographs by Berengo Gardin; other photographs by Antonio Biasiucci, Uliano Lucas, Gabriella Nessi Parlato, Franco Pinna, Ivo Saglietti, and Francesco Zizola; 77 pages.
- FotoPiano. Rome: Peliti Associati. 1996. ISBN 978-88-85121-37-9. 50 B/W photographs by Berengo Gardin, text by Giovanna Calvenzi in Italian, French and English; 91 pages. A personal look at the architect Renzo Piano.
- Hutteriti: tirolesi d'America (in Italian). Bolzano: Rætia. 1996. ISBN 978-88-7283-085-7. 31 B/W photographs by Berengo Gardin, text by Tudy Sammartini, edited by Berengo Gardin and Gabriella Nessi Parlato; 99 pages. About Hutterites in America.
  - Die Hutterer: Tiroler in Amerika (in German). Bolzano: Rætia. 1996. ISBN 978-88-7283-084-0. Translated by Hans Mayr; 100 pages.
- I colori della luce: Angelo Orsoni e l'arte del mosaico. Venice: Marsilio. 1996. ISBN 978-88-317-6338-7. In Italian and English; 28 B/W photographs by Berengo Gardin; text by Andrea Zanzotto, Marco Verità, Renato Polacca and others; edited by Cristiana Moldi-Ravenna; 195 pages. About the mosaic maker Angelo Orsoni and the art of the mosaic.
- Persone, luoghi e culture. Quattro grandi fotografi per l'Alto Adige = Menschen, Orte und Kulturen. Vier namhafte Fotografen: Bilder aus Südtirol. Bolzano: Periplo. 1996. ISBN 978-88-86113-20-5. Photographs by Berengo Gardin, Mimmo Jodice, Angelika Kampfer and Francesco Radino; text in Italian and German by Isabella Bossi Fedrigotti and Aurelio Natali; 142 pages.
- Terre a nordest: Friuli Venezia Giulia 1996, a vent'anni dal terremoto. Major fotografia (in Italian). Vol. 4. Florence: Alinari. 1996. ISBN 978-88-7292-200-2. Edited by Italo Zannier; texts by Elio Bartolini, Roberto Pirzio Biroli, Caterina Furlan, and others; photography by Gabriele Basilico, Gianantonio Battistella, Berengo Gardin, and others; 170 pages. Twenty years after the earthquakes of Ancona.
- Fotografia di una giovane repubblica. Italia 1946–1966 = Photographie d'une jeune republique. Milan: Mazzotta. 1996. ISBN 978-88-202-1165-3. Accompanying an exhibition held Centre de Conférences Albert Borschette, February–May 1996. 15 B/W photographs by Berengo Gardin; other photographs by Publifoto, Elio Luxardo, Mario De Biasi, and Tazio Secchiaroli; texts by Alberto Arbasino and Giuliana Scimé; text in Italian and French; 112 pages.
- Cinque grandi fotografi interpretano Loreto. 7^{o} Centenario lauretano, traslazione della Santa Casa 1294/1994 (in Italian). [Loreto]: [Tecnostampa]. 1996. Accompanied an exhibition held in Loreto, November–December 1995. 20 B/W photographs by Berengo Gardin; other photographs by Olivo Barbieri, Antonio Biasiucci, Mario Giacomelli and Angelo Mezzanotte; introduction by Enzo Carli; 124 pages. (Note: May be found from the search page of Catalogo del Polo Maceratese, University of Macerata.)
- Italian Portfolio: Gian Paolo Barbieri, Gabriele Basilico, Gianni Berengo Gardin, Luigi Ghirri, Mario Giacomelli, Mimmo Jodice, Paolo Monti, Ugo Mulas, Federico Patellani, Ferdinando Scianna, Studio negri, Antonio Biasiucci. Wunderkammer (in Italian). Vol. 2. Milan: L'Archivolto. 1996. ISBN 978-88-7685-089-9. Accompanying an exhibition held in New York, October–November 1996. 5 B/W photographs by Berengo Gardin; other photographs by Gian Paolo Barbieri, Gabriele Basilico, Luigi Ghirri, Mario Giacomelli, Mimmo Jodice, Paolo Monti, Ugo Mulas, Federico Patellani, Ferdinando Scianna, Studio negri, and Antonio Biasiucci; with a text by Attilio Colombo.
- Gravner (in Italian). Oslavia: J. Gravner. 1997. OCLC 455631064. B/W photographs by Berengo Gardin; text in Italian, Slovene, English and German by Alessandro Sgaravatti; photographs by Berengo Gardin, 58 pages. About the wine producer Joško Gravner.
- Zingari a Palermo: Herdelesi e Santa Rosalia (in Italian). Rome: Peliti Associati. 1997. ISBN 978-88-85121-41-6. B/W photographs by Berengo Gardin, text by Nico Staiti; 95 pages. About the Romani people in Palermo, and particularly their worship, as Muslims, of Saint Rosalia.
- La vita, nonostante: sclerosi multipla, diario per immagini (in Italian). Genoa: Associazione Italiana Sclerosi Multipla. 1997. ISBN 978-88-7148-026-8. 26 B/W photographs by Berengo Gardin; 40 pages. About multiple sclerosis.
- Rom. Leben in den 50er und 60er Jahren = Roma: vita negli anni '50 e '60 = Rome: Life in the nineteen fifties and sixties. Weingarten: Weingarten-Verlag. 1997. ISBN 978-3-8170-2518-3. Photographs by Berengo Gardin, René Burri, David Seymour, Herbert List, Henri Cartier-Bresson, Inge Morath, Bruno Barbey, Sergio Larraín, Erich Lessing and Leonard Freed; preface by Wolfgang Mielke; text in German, Italian and English; 96 pages.
- Cervia: immagini di cinque fotografi. Tavagnacco, Udine: Art&. 1997. ISBN 978-88-86550-36-9. Catalogue of an exhibition held in Cervia in 1997. In Italian and English. Photographs by Berengo Gardin, Luigi Ghirri, Guido Guidi, Paolo Monti, George Tatge; edited by Roberta Valtorta; 95 pages. About Cervia.
- Per non dimenticare: 1968. La realtà manicomiale di "Morire di classe" (in Italian). Turin: Gruppo Abele. 1998. ISBN 978-88-7670-309-6. 42 B/W photographs by Berengo Gardin; other photographs by Carla Cerati; edited by Franca Ongaro Basaglia; 77 pages. The title means "We must not forget: 1968: The reality of the asylums and Morire di classe". Although often described as a new edition of Morire di classe (1969), this has been radically revised, with a new format, different texts, different photograph selection, and identification of the photographer and place of each photograph: "It is an entirely new publication."
- Pompei (in Italian). Milan: Federico Motta. 1998. ISBN 978-88-7179-130-2. 66 B/W and 39 colour photographs by Berengo Gardin, text by Umberto Pappalardo; 104 pages of photographs plus 23 pages. About Pompeii.
  - Pompéi (in French). Arles: Actes Sud. 1998. ISBN 978-2-7427-1713-2. Translated by Michel Bresson.
  - Ponpei: Janni Berengo Garudin shashinshū ポンペイ ジャンニ・ベレンゴ・ガルディン写真集 (in Japanese). Tokyo: Iwanami Shoten. 1998. ISBN 978-4-00-008193-1.
- Una città una fabbrica: Ivrea e la Olivetti dal 1967 al 1985 nelle fotografie di Gianni Berengo Gardin. Collana I grandi libri (in Italian). Ivrea: Priuli & Verlucca. 1998. ISBN 978-88-8068-095-6. 57 B/W photographs by Berengo Gardin, text by Renzo Zorzi. About Ivrea and Olivetti from 1967 to 1985.
- Les Italiens de Gianni Berengo Gardin: 1953–1997. Autrement. Série Monde/Photographie (in French). Paris: Autrement. 1998. ISBN 978-2-86260-795-5. 74 B/W photographs by Berengo Gardin, edited by Guy Mandery; 111 pages. Not sold to the public, but instead presented by the publisher.
- Bertone design machine. Car men. Vol. 1. Milan: Automobilia. 1998. ISBN 978-88-7960-085-9. Text in Italian, French and English by Giancarlo Perini; 12 pages of B/W photographs by Berengo Gardin; color photographs by Marcandrea Ferrari and Massimo Perini; 88 pages. About Carrozzeria Bertone.
- Walter de' Silva: Centro Stile Alfa Romeo. Car men. Vol. 2. Milan: Automobilia. 1998. ISBN 978-88-7960-032-3. Text in Italian, French and English by Riccardo P. Felicioli; 12 pages of B/W photographs by Berengo Gardin; edited by Gaetano Derosa; 95 pages. About Walter de Silva and Alfa Romeo design.
- Sergio Pininfarina: Pininfarina Studi & Ricerche. Car men. Vol. 3. Milan: Automobilia. 1998. ISBN 978-88-7960-049-1. Text in Italian, French and English by Riccardo P. Felicioli; 12 pages of B/W photographs by Berengo Gardin; edited by Saveria Tolomeo; 93 pages. About Sergio Pininfarina and Carrozzeria Pininfarina.
- Bruno Sacco: Mercedes-Benz Bereich Design. Car men. Vol. 4. Milan: Automobilia. 1998. ISBN 978-88-7960-090-3. Text in Italian, French and English; edited by Saveria Tolomeo and Alessandra Finzi; 12 pages of B/W photographs by Berengo Gardin. About Bruno Sacco and Mercedes-Benz design.
- Memorie di un dilettante: Vintage prints 1952–1960 (in Italian). Rome: Galleria Minima Peliti Associati. 1998. Photography by Berengo Gardin; 62 pages. Accompanied an exhibition at Galleria Minima Peliti Associati, June–July 1998.
- San Pietro in Vaticano: la magia degli interni: antologia di grandi viaggiatori dal 1400 al 1900 (in Italian). Milan: Touring Club Italiano. 1998. ISBN 978-88-365-1393-2. 49 B/W photographs by Berengo Gardin; other photographs by Olivo Barbieri; texts by Marina Carta, Diego Mormorio and Attilio Brilli; 171 pages. About St. Peter's Basilica.
  - San Pietro in Vaticano: emozioni nel tempo: antologia di grandi viaggiatori dal 1400 al 1900 (in Italian). Milan: Touring Club Italiano. 1998. OCLC 799962978. Special edition for Esso Italia.
  - St Peter's: Art and faith through the ages. Milan: Touring Club Italiano. 1998. ISBN 978-88-365-1393-2.
- Gli anni ribelli, 1968–1980. Storia fotografica della società italiana (in Italian). Rome: Editori Riuniti. 1998. ISBN 978-88-359-5449-1. By Tano D'Amico but with 14 B/W photographs by Berengo Gardin; introduction by Giovanni De Luna.
- Il '68 e Milano (in Italian). Milan: Leonardo arte. 1998. ISBN 978-88-7813-167-5. Catalogue of an exhibition held for Milan Triennale in Milan, May–June 1998. Exhibition curated by Uliano Lucas, book edited by Giovanna Calvenzi; 10 B/W photographs by Berengo Gardin; 80+144 pages.
- Il boom, 1954–1967. Storia fotografica della società italiana (in Italian). Rome: Editori Riuniti. 1998. ISBN 978-88-359-4458-4. By Giorgio Olmoti; 30 B/W photographs by Berengo Gardin; 192 pages.
- Giò Pomodoro at the seventh International Cairo Biennale 1998. Milan: Signum. 1998. OCLC 48863345. Co-sponsored by Egyptian Ministry of Culture, Egyptian National Center for the Fine Arts, 7th International Biennale of Cairo, Italian Ministry of Foreign Affairs, Italian Embassy in Cairo, Italian Cultural Institute of Cairo; accompanying an exhibition of Giò Pomodoro held for the seventh International Cairo Biennale, in Cairo, December 1998 – February 1999. 88 pages. An edition of 170 copies.
- I ponti di Milano: tutti gli attraversamenti dei Navigli milanesi e pavesi (in Italian). Milan: Mursia. 1998. ISBN 978-88-425-2444-1. 7 B/W photographs by Berengo Gardin; other photographs by Toni Nicolini and others; 234 pages. About canal bridges in Milan and Pavia.
- Lungo la via: itinerario fotografico sulla Via Francigena da Reims a Roma (in Italian). Fidenza: Mattioli. OCLC 886450817. On the Via Francigena from Reims to Rome; 43 pages. Circa 1998.
- Italiani. Tools photo (in Italian). Milan: Federico Motta. 1999. ISBN 978-88-7179-186-9. Photographs by Berengo Gardin; introduction by Stefano Benni; edited by Susanna Berengo Gardin; 477 pages.
  - Italiani (in French). Arles: Actes Sud. 2000. ISBN 978-2-7427-2674-5. Translated by Anne Bresson-Lucas.
  - Italians = Italiener. Kempen: te Neues. 2000. ISBN 978-3-8238-5453-1. Text in German and English, translated by Yvette Wiesenthal and Anthony Vivis respectively.
- Attraverso l'Italia del novecento. Immagini e pagine d'autore (in Italian). Milan: Touring Club Italiano. 1999. 60 B/W photographs by Berengo Gardin; other photographs by Giorgio Lotti, Paolo Monti and others; text by Indro Montanelli, Umberto Eco, Dino Buzzati and others; 336 pages.
- Parco Agricolo Sud Milano (in Italian). Milan: Prometheus. 1999. 50 B/W photographs by Berengo Gardin; other photographs by Gabriele Basilico; 126 pages. About Parco Agricolo Sud Milano.
- Giorgetto Giugiaro & Fabrizio: Italdesign. Car men. Vol. 5. Milan: Automobilia. 1999. ISBN 978-88-7960-103-0. Text in Italian, French and English by Giuliano Molineri; 12 pages of B/W photographs by Berengo Gardin; 115 pages. About Giorgetto Giugiaro, Fabrizio Giugiaro and Italdesign.
- Il mito del benessere, 1981–1990. Storia fotografica della società italiana (in Italian). Rome: Editori Riuniti. 1999. ISBN 978-88-359-4688-5. By Manuela Fugenza; 61 B/W photographs by Berengo Gardin; 192 pages.

=== 2000s ===
- Venerdì Santo: San Sisto: sei giorni nella città dei Ciclopi (in Italian). Alatri (FR): Comune di Alatri. 2000. OCLC 48913508. About the Festival of St Sixtus (Pope Sixtus I), held at Alatri; 50 B/W photographs by Berengo Gardin; edited by Antonio Rossi; 70 leaves of plates.
- Oltre l'acciaio. Andrea Pittini. Osoppo: Pittini. 2000. About Andrea Pittini (of the Pittini Group). 25 B/W photographs by Berengo Gardin; text in Italian and English by Piero Fortuna; 160 pages.
- Patrick Le Quément: Renault design. Car men. Vol. 6. Milan: Automobilia. 2000. ISBN 978-88-7960-106-1. Text in Italian, French and English by George Mason; 12 pages of B/W photographs by Berengo Gardin; 96 pages. About Patrick Le Quément and Renault design.
- Franco Mantegazza: I.DE.A. institute. Car men. Vol. 7. Milan: Automobilia. 2000. ISBN 978-88-7960-108-5. Text in Italian, French and English by Enrico Leonardo Fagone; 12 pages of B/W photographs by Berengo Gardin; 94 pages. About Franco Mantegazza and I.DE.A Institute.
- Chris Bangle: BMW Global Design. Car men. Vol. 8. Milan: Automobilia. 2000. ISBN 978-88-7960-112-2. Text in Italian, French and English by Bruno Alfieri; 12 pages of B/W photographs by Berengo Gardin; 95 pages. About Chris Bangle and BMW Global Design.
- Terre di risaia (in Italian). Rome: Peliti. 2001. ISBN 978-88-85121-75-1. 94 B/W photographs by Berengo Gardin, text by Arnaldo Colombo; 167 pages. On rice farming in Italy.
- © Copyright Gianni Berengo Gardin (in Italian). Rome: Peliti. 2001. ISBN 978-88-85121-69-0. Catalogue of an exhibition held at Museo Civico di Padova, June–October 2001. 151 B/W photographs by Berengo Gardin, text by Giovanna Calvenzi and Ferdinando Scianna; 195 pages.
- Centro Stile Lancia: Lancia. Car men. Vol. 9. Milan: Automobilia. 2001. ISBN 978-88-7960-121-4. Text in Italian, French and English by Daniele Cornil; 12 pages of B/W photographs by Berengo Gardin; 95 pages. About Centro Stile Lancia.
- Antonio Marras. Stardust 2. Gli emergenti. Milan: Stardust. 2001. ISBN 978-88-7960-124-5. Text in Italian, English and French by Cristina Morozzi; 20 B/W photographs by Berengo Gardin; 96 pages. About Antonio Marras.
- Cinisello Balsamo: dodici racconti di Gianni Berengo Gardin (in Italian). Cinisello Balsamo, Milan: Silvana. 2002. ISBN 978-88-8215-480-6. 200 B/W photographs by Berengo Gardin; text by Alessandro Balducci and Maurizio Zanuso. About Cinisello Balsamo; 127 pages.
- Genova nel cuore del porto = Genoa at the heart of the port. Genoa: Tormena. 2002. ISBN 978-88-8480-032-9. 86 B/W hotographs by Berengo Gardin; other photographs by Gabriella Nessi Parlato; text in Italian and English by Massimo Minella; 240 pages. About the port of Genoa.
- Veneziani (in Italian). Venice: Caffè Florian. 2002. Catalogue of an exhibition held at Caffè Florian, Venice, May–June 2002. 18 B/W photographs by Berengo Gardin; text by Daniela Gaddo Vedaldi, Stefano Stipitivich and Alvise Zorzi.
- In giro per Roma = A stroll through time (in Italian). Rome: Fratelli Palombi. 2002. ISBN 978-88-7621-266-6. 82 colour photographs by Berengo Gardin; text by Paolo Cipriani and Dario Girolami; 140 pages.
- Hartmut Warkuss: Volkswagen Design. Car men. Vol. 10. Milan: Automobilia. 2002. ISBN 978-88-7960-130-6. Text in Italian, French and English by Marco Degl'Innocenti; 12 pages of B/W photographs by Berengo Gardin; 83 pages. About Hartmut Warkuss and Volkswagen Design.
- Zagato (1919–2002). Car men. Vol. 11. Milan: Automobilia. 2002. ISBN 978-88-7960-163-4. Text in Italian, French and English by Andrea Zagato; 12 pages of B/W photographs by Berengo Gardin; other photographs by Simone Falcetta; 95 pages. About Zagato.
- Michael Mauer: Saab Design Centre. Car men. Vol. 12. Milan: Automobilia. 2002. ISBN 978-88-7960-138-2. Text in Italian, French and English; 12 pages of B/W photographs by Berengo Gardin; edited by Matt Davis; 95 pages. About Saab.
- Staglieno: giganti di marmo = marble giants. Genoa: Tormena. 2002. ISBN 978-88-8480-031-2. 38 B/W photographs by Berengo Gardin; other photographs by Gabriella Nessi Parlato, text in Italian and English by Antonio Riccardi and Simona Basso; 139 pages. About 19th and 20th century funerary sculpture at the Monumental Cemetery of Staglieno, Genoa.
- Gli anni del neorealismo. Tendenze della fotografia italiana. Turin: Federazione Italiana Associazioni Fotografiche. 2002. Catalogue of an exhibition. Text in Italian and French; includes 15 B/W photographs by Berengo Gardin; 272 pages.
- Catania in mostra. Tre sguardi sulla città (in Italian). Catania: Città di Catania, Assessorato alla Cultura. 2002. Photographs by Berengo Gardin, Carmelo Bongiorno and Giovanni Chiaramonte; 56 pages. Photographs of Catania.
- L'Italia, ingegno e civiltà. Bergamo: Grafica & Arte. 2002. ISBN 978-8872012314. 10 B/W photographs by Berengo Gardin; other photographs by Mario De Biasi and others; text in Italian and English by Amanzio Possenti; 164 pages.
- Toscane: een literaire ontdekkingsreis (in Dutch). Leuven: Davidsfonds/Literair. 2002. ISBN 978-9080675919. Simultaneously published in Utrecht by Het Spectrum. Photographs by Berengo Gardin, 288 pages. Extracts from literary texts about Tuscany, edited by Patrick Lateur.
- Ugo Nespolo: dentro lo studio. Milan: Skira. 2003. ISBN 978-88-8491-669-3. Title also rendered as Dentro lo studio quel che c'è e si vede. 135 B/W photographs by Berengo Gardin; text in Italian and English by Ugo Nespolo; 151 pages. About Ugo Nespolo and his studio.
- Il était une fois l'Europe (in French). Tourcoing: Helios. 2003. 53 B/W photographs by Berengo Gardin; preface by Guy Mandery; 64 pages.
- Piero Luigi Carcerano: automotive and design engineering. Car men. Vol. 14. Milan: Automobilia. 2003. ISBN 978-88-7960-150-4. Text in Italian, French and English by Bruno Alfieri; 12 pages of B/W photographs by Berengo Gardin; 108 pages. About Piero Luigi Carcerano.
- Assonime (in Italian). Milan: Assonime. 2003. Photography by Berengo Gardin; art direction and coordination by Ogilvy and Mather; 24 pages. About Assonime.
- Bitonto (in Italian). Alberobello: Associazione culturale Nicéphore Niépce. 2003. Photography by Berengo Gardin, Antonella Pierno and Nicola Pice; text by Denis Curti; 50 pages.
- CPictures. Rome: Contrasto Due. 2003. ISBN 978-88-86982-78-8. 68 B/W photographs by Berengo Gardin; other photographs by Martin Parr, Gueorgui Pinkhassov and Sandro Sodano; text in Italian and English by Renata Molho and Denis Curti.
- Italia: ritratto di un paese in sessant'anni di fotografia (in Italian). Rome: Contrasto. 2003. ISBN 978-88-86982-70-2. 11 B/W photographs by Berengo Gardin; edited by Giovanna Calvenzi; 156 pages.
  - Photographing Italy: 60 incredible years presented in over 350 amazing images by 120 of the world's greatest photographers. London: Thames & Hudson. 2003. ISBN 978-0-500-54279-8.
  - Italia. Portrait einer Nation: Fotografien aus sechs Jahrzehnten (in German). Munich: Schirmer/Mosel. 2003. ISBN 978-3-8296-0096-5.
  - Italia: Portrait d'un pays en soixante ans de photographie (in German). Marval. 2003. ISBN 978-2-86234-372-3.
- Quotidiano ai femminile. Trenta storie di donne nell'Italia che cambia (in Italian). Rome: Peliti Associati. 2003. ISBN 978-88-85121-84-3. 18 B/W photographs by Berengo Gardin; photographs by various other photographers; text by various authors; 276 pages.
- Il Campo: il senso di una piazza. Siena: Protagon editori toscani. 2003. ISBN 978-88-8024-111-9. Texts in Italian and English by Roberto Barzanti et al.; 6 B/W photographs by Berengo Gardin; also photographs by others; edited by Mauro Civai and Giovanni Santi; 190 pages. Published for the exhibition "Tre piazze d'Italia: Siena, Mantova e Pavia", held at Magazzini del Sale, Siena, August–September 2003. About Piazza del Campo, Siena.
- Leica. Testimone di un secolo (in Italian). Bergamo: Bolis. 2003. ISBN 978-88-7827-115-9. Preface by Berengo Gardin; edited by Alessandro Pasi; 160 pages.
  - Leica: Witness to a century. New York: W W Norton. 2004. ISBN 978-0-393-05921-2.
  - Leica: Witness to a century. New York: W W Norton. 2012. ISBN 978-0-393-08900-4. Revised edition.
- Viaggio a Corigliano (in Italian). Rome: Contrasto Due. 2004. ISBN 978-88-89032-59-6. 128 B/W photographs by Berengo Gardin; text by Enzo Viteritti and Denis Curti; 199 pages. About Corigliano Calabro.
- Incontri mantovani (in Italian). Rome: Peliti Associati. 2004. ISBN 978-88-89412-09-1. 154 B/W photographs by Berengo Gardin; text by Stefano Scansani, introduction by Edgarda Ferri, sponsored by Fondazione Banca Agricola Mantovana; 139 pages. About Mantua.
- La fabbrica Scala all'Ansaldo (in Italian). Milan: Edizioni del Teatro alla Scala. 2004. 148 B/W photographs by Berengo Gardin; preface by Carlo Fontana; text by Sandro Fusina; 182 pages.
- Viale della Previdenza sociale (in Italian). Rome: Peliti Associati. 2004. ISBN 978-88-85121-91-1. 70 B/W photographs by Berengo Gardin, texts by Gian Paolo Sassi, Francesco Lotito and Vittorio Crecco; 116 pages. About Istituto nazionale della previdenza sociale.
- Gianni Berengo Gardin. Toscana, gente e territorio (in Italian). Lucca: Fondazione Centro Ragghianti. 2004. ISBN 978-88-89324-00-4. The title may instead be simply Toscana, gente e territorio. 61 B/W photographs by Berengo Gardin, edited by Vittorio Fagone; 80 pages. About the people and land of Tuscany. Accompanying an exhibition held in Fondazione Ragghianti (Lucca), July–October 2004.
- Donne al timone: il management nell'impresa femminile: 30 storie di successo (in Italian). Rome: One group. 2004. OCLC 799703628. 83 B/W photographs by Berengo Gardin; texts by Francesca Pompa and Mariangela Gritta Grainer; edited by Alberto Valentini; 230 pages. About businesswomen.
- Miracolo a Pisogne: Gianni Berengo Gardin fotografa l'incontro tra Adolf Vallazza, scultore contemporaneo, e Girolamo Romanino, pittore del '500 (in Italian). S.l.: s.n. 2004. OCLC 799329409. Photographs by Berengo Gardin, 48 pages. About the sculptor Adolf Vallazza and the painter Girolamo Romanino; catalogue of an exhibition held at Pisogne.
- Ferretti, l'arte della scenografia: testi e bozzetti originali di Dante Ferretti = The art of production design: Texts and sketches by Dante Ferretti. L'Aquila: Electa. 2004. ISBN 978-88-370-2772-8. 17 B/W photographs by Berengo Gardin; edited by Gabriele Lucci; text in Italian and English; 344 pages. About Dante Ferretti.
- Venezia (in Italian). Palermo: Istituto Superiore per la Storia della Fotografia. 2004. ISBN 978-88-87928-09-9. Berengo Gardin describes this as one of several new editions of Venise des saisons (1965).
- Italia doppie visioni (in Italian). Rome: Contrasto. 2004. ISBN 978-8889032343. 11 B/W photographs by Berengo Gardin; edited by Giovanna Calvenzi; 156 pages. Accompanying an exhibition Palazzo del Quirinale / Scuderie Papali, June–August 2004.
- Gli anni della Dolce Vita. Tendenze della fotografia italiana (in Italian). Turin: FIAF. 2004. 17 B/W photographs by Berengo Gardin; text by Cesare Colombo and Antonio Maraldi; 188 pages. (Note: Although the SBN catalogue record does not mention Berengo Gardin, there is other evidence for his contribution.)
- Mediterranea. Dallo stretto dei Dardanelli alle Colonne d'Ercole (in Italian). Milan: Federico Motta. 2004. ISBN 978-88-7179-509-6. Catalogue of an exhibition held in Bari, 2005–2006. 12 B/W photographs by Berengo Gardin; 300 pages.
- Cesare Zavattini. Tra letteratura, cinema, pittura (in Italian). Naples: LER. 2005. ISBN 978-88-8264-352-2. Catalogue of an exhibition at Pinacoteca Civica di Latina, October–December 2005. Photographs by Berengo Gardin; exhibition curated by Lydia Palumbo Scalzi; 142 pages. About Cesare Zavattini.
- Gianni Berengo Gardin (in Italian). Rome: Contrasto. 2005. ISBN 978-88-89032-52-7. In conversation with Goffredo Fofi and Frank Horvat, interview about books by Floriana Pagano; edited by Roberto Koch and Alessandra Mauro. A large (439 pages) hardback survey of Berengo Gardin's work. (Note: OCLC 62269215 and other sources give the impression that there is one book, with two ISBNs, in both Italian and English. There are in fact two separate books, with identical titles and front covers and from the same publisher, one in Italian (Library Hub Discover record here) and the other in English (University of Texas at Austin library OPAC record here).)
  - Gianni Berengo Gardin. Rome: Contrasto. 2005. ISBN 978-88-89032-72-5.
  - Gianni Berengo Gardin, photographer. London: Thames & Hudson. 2005. ISBN 978-0-500-54312-2.
  - Gianni Berengo Gardin (in French). Paris: La Martinière. 2005. ISBN 978-2732432717. Translated from the Italian by Kareen Pinter and Martin Vincent Raynaud. Contains "Journal intime d'Italie, un demi-siècle de photographies", dialogue de l'artiste avec Goffredo Fofi; 439 pages.
- Dentro il lavoro. Nello studio di Andrea Martinelli (in Italian). Pontedera: SBP Editore. 2005. OCLC 908543573. 16 B/W photographs by Berengo Gardin; text by Umberto Cecchi and Flavio Arensi; 48 pages.
- Carlo Scarpa. Il complesso monumentale Brion. Studi su Carlo Scarpa (in Italian). Venice: Marsilio. 2005. ISBN 978-88-317-8859-5. Text by Vitale Zanchettin, 40 B/W photographs by Berengo Gardin, 211 pages. About Brion Cemetery and Carlo Scarpa.
- Gianni Berengo Gardin. FotoNote (in Italian). Vol. 10. Rome: Contrasto. 2005. ISBN 978-88-89032-65-7. 64 B/W photographs by Berengo Gardin; introduction by Giovanna Calvenzi. A compact paperback.
  - Gianni Berengo Gardin. Photo poche (in French). Vol. 102. Arles: Actes Sud. 2005. ISBN 978-2742754861. Translated by Valérie Lermite; 144 pages.
- Parigi 1954 (in Italian). Turin: FIAF. 2005. 67 B/W photographs by Berengo Gardin; text by Fulvio Merlak, Giorgio Tani, Cesare Colombo and Cinzia Busi Thompson; 96 pages. About Paris in 1954.
- L'altro sguardo = Mit anderen Augen = A distinct regard. Rome: Peliti. 2005. ISBN 978-88-89412-08-4. 98 B/W photographs by Berengo Gardin; text by Claudio Abbado and interview of Berengo Gardin by Peter Paul Kainrath, in Italian, German and English; 192 pages. About Gustav Mahler Jugendorchester and European Union Youth Orchestra. Catalogue of an exhibition held at Bolzano, July–October 2005.
- Fabrizio Pozzoli: oversize. 2005. Co-published by Silvana (Cinisello Balsamo) and Montrasio arte (Monza); text in Italian and English; photographs by Berengo Gardin and Vitale Zanchettin; 30 pages. About the sculptor Fabrizio Pozzoli.
- La pietra armata. Concezione e costruzione della Chiesa di Padre Pio, progettata da Renzo Piano = The reinforced stone, Padre Pio church by Renzo Piano in San Giovanni Rotondo, from concept to construction. Foggia: Claudio Grenzi editore. 2005. ISBN 978-88-8431-166-5. Photography by Berengo Gardin, Michel Denancé and Stefano Goldberg; in Italian and English; edited by Domenico Potenza; 56 pages. About the Padre Pio church.
- Sostenibile. Gianni Berengo Gardin fotografa Hera (in Italian). Bologna: Hera. 2005. ISBN 978-8890213304. 80 pages. About the Hera Group.
- Sostenibile. Gianni Berengo Gardin fotografa Hera (in Italian). Bologna: Hera. 2005. 96 pages. Catalogue of a travelling exhibition, June–December 2005. About the Hera Group.
- Andrea Martinelli: il volto e l'ombra (in Italian). Cinisello Balsamo: Silvana. 2005. ISBN 978-88-366-0605-4. Co-published by Montrasio (Monza, Milan); edited by Flavio Arensi and Ruggero Montrasio; photography by Berengo Gardin; poems by Alda Merini; text by Ada Masoero and others; 140 pages. About the works of the painter Andrea Martinelli. Catalogue of an exhibition held November–December 2005 at the Società per le Belle Arti ed Esposizione Permanente, Milan, March–June 2006 at the Rustin Foundation, Antwerp, and July–October 2006 at the Frisia Museum, Spanbroek-Amsterdam.
- Italiane: un fotografo per i diritti umani: Amnesty International. Immagini (in Italian). Turin: Edizioni Gruppo Abele (EGA). 2006. ISBN 978-88-7670-568-7. 68 B/W photographs by Berengo Gardin, edited by Carla Costamagna Martino; 79 pages.
- Leopardi: la biblioteca, la casa, l'infinito: fotografie di Gianni Berengo Gardin (in Italian). Verucchio (Rimini): P.G. Pazzini. 2006. ISBN 978-88-89198-89-6. 34 B/W photographs by Berengo Gardin, curated by Maria Perosino; text by Giorgio Ficara; 47 pages. On the house and library of Giacomo Leopardi. Catalogue of an exhibition held in the Palazzo Ducale, Urbino, September–October 2006.
- Gianni Berengo Gardin: reportage in Sardegna 1968–2006. Carta per gli occhi (in Italian). Nuoro: Imago. 2006. ISBN 978-88-89545-07-2. (The title is also presented as Reportage in Sardegna 1968–2006.) 125 B/W photographs by Berengo Gardin, edited by Daniela Zedda; text by Pino Corrias and Pasquale Chessa; 197 pages. About Sardinia.
- Gianni Berengo Gardin: Venezia (in Italian). Palermo: Istituto superiore per la storia della fotografia. 2006. ISBN 978-88-87928-09-9. (The title is also presented as Venezia.) B/W photographs of Venice by Berengo Gardin, text by Paolo Morello; 125 pages.
- Vicenza yes aim. Cronaca di una città sospesa tra passato e futuro (in Italian). Milan: Federico Motta. 2006. 73 B/W photographs by Berengo Gardin; text by Paolo Madron; edited by Rossella Castrusini; 96 pages. About Vicenza.
- Graziella Marchi: canto libero (in Italian). Cinisello Balsamo: Silvana. 2006. ISBN 978-88-366-5077-4. Text by Flavio Arensi; photographs by Berengo Gardin; 175 pages. About the artist Graziella Marchi.
- Immagini del costruire 1946–2006 (in Italian). Milan: Skira. 2006. ISBN 978-88-7624-627-2. Photographs by Berengo Gardin, Gabriele Basilico, Luca Campigotto; 133 pages.
- Gianni Berengo Gardin: reportage su Carlo Scarpa, fotografie 1966–1972. Quaderni del Museo Palladio (in Italian). Vol. 8. Vicenza: Centro internazionale di studi di architettura Andrea Palladio. 2006. OCLC 848766609. Photographs by Berengo Gardin, curated by Maddalena Scimemi; 36 pages. About Carlo Scarpa. Catalogue of an exhibition at the Museo Palladio, June–July 2006.
- Un paesaggio italiano. Immagini (in Italian). Turin: Edizioni Gruppo Abele (EGA). 2007. ISBN 978-88-7670-620-2. Published for the travelling exhibition Un paesaggio italiano. 95 B/W photographs by Berengo Gardin, preface by Maurizio Maggiani; 127 pages. About the countryside around Giovo.
- Le città visibili (in Italian). Milan: Edizione Triennale Electa. 2007. ISBN 978-88-370-5208-9. Title also given as Renzo Piano building workshop: le città visibili. 65 photographs by Berengo Gardin and others; text by Renzo Piano, Vittorio Sgarbi and Davide Rampello; edited by Fulvio Irace; 320 pages.
  - Renzo Piano building workshop: Visible cities. Milan: Edizione Triennale Electa. 2007. ISBN 978-88-370-5209-6. Translated by John Venerella.
- Le città del lavoro. Mestieri professioni a Milano tra memoria e futuro (in Italian). Milan: Skira. 2007. ISBN 978-88-6130-425-3. Photographs by Berengo Gardin and Luca Placido; essays by Elisa Bellavita, Andrea Granelli, Roberto Lavarini and others; edited by Walter Passerini; 160 pages.
- Impresa sociale. I mille volti dell'utile. Un reportage di Gianni Berengo Gardin (in Italian). Genoa: Finanziara Ligure per lo sviluppo economico. 2007. 112 pages.
- Morricone: cinema e oltre = cinema and more. Protagonisti del cinema. Milan: Electa. 2007. ISBN 978-88-370-4143-4. 19 B/W photographs by Berengo Gardin, edited by Gabriele Lucci; text in Italian and English; 303 pages; includes Compact Disc. About Ennio Morricone.
- Paesaggio prossimo. La provincia di Milano nello sguardo contemporaneo di dodici fotografi (in Italian). Rome: Contrasto. 2007. ISBN 978-88-6965-057-4. 12 B/W photographs by Berengo Gardin; other photographs by Gabriele Basilico, Enrico Bossan, Lorenzo Cicconi Massi, Daniele Dainelli, Stefano De Luigi, Guido Harari, Alex Majoli, Paolo Pellegrin, Francesco Radino, Massimo Siragusa and Riccardo Venturi; 240 pages.
- Il fiume dei fiumi: dieci fotografi e il Po (in Italian). Caselle di Sommacampagna, Verona: Cierre. 2007. ISBN 978-88-8314-454-7. 10 B/W photographs by Berengo Gardin; photographs by nine other photographers; 179 pages. About the river Po.
- Andrea Martinelli: il volto della lontananza: carte 1991–2007 (in Italian). Biasca: Comune di Biasca. 2007. ISBN 978-88-87278-81-1. Catalogue of an exhibition held at Casa Cavalier Pellanda, Biasca, December 2007 – February 2008. Photographs of Martinelli's studio by Berengo Gardin, text by Stefano Crespi; exhibition and catalogue curated by Marco Gurtner; 48 pages.
- Marcello Mariani: percorsi di luce. Mazzotta/fotografia. Milan: Mazzotta. 2008. ISBN 978-88-202-1874-4. Text in Italian and English; 72 B/W photographs by Berengo Gardin, curated by Silvia Pegoraro. 141 pages. About the painter and sculptor Marcello Mariani.
- Polesine (in Italian). Palermo: Istituto Superiore per la Storia della Fotografia. 2008. ISBN 978-88-87928-13-6. 93 B/W photographs by Berengo Gardin; text by Paolo Morello; 144 pages. On Polesine: a thematically organized new edition of some of the work that had appeared in the 1971 book Polesine.
- Blutfreitag: il venerdi del preziosissimo sangue. Mantua: Tre Lune. 2008. ISBN 978-88-89832-20-2. Title also presented as Blutfreitag: Mantova Weingarten: il venerdi del preziosissimo sangue. 51 B/W photographs by Berengo Gardin; other photographs by Antonella Monzoni; text by Rodolfo Signorini and Hans Ulrich Rudolf; postface by Filippo Trevisiani; in Italian and German; 112 pages. About Holy Week and Good Friday in Mantua.
- Fabrizio Pozzoli: oversize in studio. Cinisello Balsamo: Silvana. 2008. OCLC 227017820. 5 B/W photographs by Berengo Gardin; 32 pages. About the sculptor Fabrizio Pozzoli.
- Giorgio Morandi's Studio. Milan: Charta. 2008. ISBN 978-88-8158-720-9. Text in Italian and English by Carlo Zucchini and Silva Palombi; photographs by Berengo Gardin, 101 pages. About the studio of Giorgio Morandi.
- Oltre la pietra: la Puglia nelle fotografie di Olivo Barbieri, Gabriele Basilico, Gianni Berengo Gardin, Luca Campigotto, Ferdinando Scianna. Milan: Federico Motta. 2008. ISBN 978-88-7179-596-6. Text in Italian and English; edited by Arianna Fantoni; with 42 B/W photographs by Berengo Gardin; and photographs by Olivo Barbieri, Gabriele Basilico, Luca Campigotto and Ferdinando Scianna; 285 pages. About building stones in the region of Apulia.
- Montrasio, Ruggero (2008). Andrea Martinelli: relazioni possibili. Silvana. ISBN 978-88-366-1233-8. Catalogue of an exhibition held in Milan in 2008. Co-published in Cinisello Balsamo by Silvana and in Milano by Montrasio Arte. Text in Italian and English. Photographs by Berengo Gardin; edited by Ruggero Montrasio and Fabrizio Moretti; essays by Antonio Natali and Walter Schönenberger.
- Mimmo Paladino: ortissima (in Italian). Turin: Umberto Allemandi. 2009. ISBN 978-88-422-1777-0. Title also presented as Paladino. Accompanying an exhibition held at Palazzo Penotti Ubertini, Orta San Giulio, July–November 2009. 50 B/W photographs by Berengo Gardin; curated by Flavio Arensi and Valeria Greppi; texts by Flavio Arensi and Goffredo Fofi; 79 pages. About the artist Mimmo Paladino.
- Peggy Guggenheim, la casa, gli amici, Venezia (in Italian). Milan: Giunti. 2009. ISBN 978-88-09-74599-5. Catalogue of an exhibition at Arca, Vercelli, Vercelli, October–December 2009. 88 B/W photographs by Berengo Gardin, curated by Pina Inferrera; 127 pages. About Peggy Guggenheim.
- Camogli (in Italian). Milan: Federico Motta. 2009. ISBN 978-88-7179-632-1. Catalogue of an exhibition held at Fondazione Pier Luigi e Natalina Remotti, Camogli, Italy, October 2009 – January 2010. 103 B/W photographs by Berengo Gardin; made with the collaboration of Donatella Pollini; text by Silvana Turzio; 144 pages. About Camogli.
- Casa e parco di Grignano. Il santuario, il convento, la dimora di Grignano (in Italian). Vol. 3. Padua: Edizione Ignazio Vok. 2009. OCLC 858731429. Photographs by Berengo Gardin, Lorenzo Trento and Bogdan Zupan; texts by Sergio Ivanissevich and Ignazio Vok; not paginated. About Grignano, Trieste.
- Gianni Berengo Gardin (in Italian). Bergamo: Elleni Galleria d'arte. 2009. 30 B/W photographs by Berengo Gardin; edited by Uber Calori; interview by Giuseppe Meroni; 70 pages.
- La preziosa donazione di un antiquario galantuomo (in Italian). Venice: Fondazione Querini Stampalia Onlus. 2009. OCLC 664431585. Photographs by Berengo Gardin; edited by Elisabetta Dal Carlo; 158 pages.
- Gianni Berengo Gardin: reportrait: incursioni di un reporter nel mondo della cultura = Incursions of a reporter into the world of culture. Turin: Umberto Allemandi. 2009. ISBN 978-88-422-1766-4. Title is also rendered as Reportrait. Catalogue of an exhibition held at Palazzo Penotti Ubertini, Orta San Giulio, May–October 2009. Portrait photography: 215 B/W photographs by Berengo Gardin; text by Flavio Arensi; project by Flavio Arensi, Luca Caramella, Valeria Greppi; 254 pages.
- Viaggio lungo il Po: cento immagini per dieci storie. Caselle di Sommacampagna, Verona: Cierre. 2009. ISBN 978-88-8314-538-4. Text in Italian and English. 10 B/W photographs by Berengo Gardin; additional photographs by other photographers; text by Dario A. Franchini; 172 pages. About the river Po.
- Dieci fotografi d'oro (in Italian). Padua: Il Poligrafo. 2009. ISBN 978-88-7115-652-1. 10 B/W photographs by Berengo Gardin; other photographs by Gabriele Basilico, Luca Campigotto, Giovanni Chiaramonte, Mario Cresci, Mario De Biasi, Franco Fontana, Paolo Gioli, Guido Guidi, Mimmo Jodice, Fulvio Roiter and Marco Zanta.

=== 2010s ===
- Gente di Milano (in Italian). Milan: 24 ore cultura. 2010. ISBN 978-88-7179-654-3. 158 B/W photographs by Berengo Gardin, 240 pages. About the people of Milan.
- Gianni Berengo Gardin, Elliott Erwitt: nei luoghi di Piero della Francesca; Arezzo, Anghiari, Sansepolcro = In Piero della Francesca places. Cinisello Balsamo, Milan: Silvana. 2010. ISBN 978-88-366-1674-9. In Italian and English. Catalogue of an exhibition held at Palazzo Pichi Sforza, Sansepolcro, March–June 2010. 25 B/W photographs by Berengo Gardin; other photographs by Elliott Erwitt; edited by Stefano Curone; 96 pages. On the trail of Piero della Francesca in Arezzo, Anghiari and Sansepolcro.
- Incroci. ATM. Azienda trasporti milanesi S.p.A. (in Italian). Cava de'Tirreni: Grafica Metelliana Edizioni. 2010. ISBN 978-88-95534-03-9. 111 B/W photographs by Berengo Gardin; edited by Cristina Volpi; 128 pages. About Azienda Trasporti Milanesi.
- Fotografie al margine. Dalla società dell'immagine all'immagine della società = Photographs on the fringe: From society of images to images of society. Pescara: Carsa edizioni. 2010. ISBN 978-88-501-0251-8. 10 B/W photographs by Berengo Gardin; other photographs by Gabriele Basilico, Luca Campigotto and Andrea Jemolo. Curated by Domenico Potenza and Cosmo Laera, text in Italian and English by Carmen Andriani; 96 pages.
- La fotografia in Italia: 1945–1975 (in Italian). Rome: Contrasto. 2010. ISBN 978-88-6965-219-6. By Paolo Morello, includes 21 B/W photographs by Berengo Gardin; two volumes, 560+272 pages. (Note: Page about La fotografia in Italia: 1945–1975, Contrasto.)
- La fotografia in Sardegna: lo sguardo esterno 1960–1980. Storia della fotografia in Sardegna (in Italian). Nuoro: Ilisso. 2010. ISBN 978-88-6202-067-1. By Paolo Morello, includes 11 B/W photographs by Berengo Gardin; 280 pages.
- Festa di compleanno (in Italian). 2010. Text by Antonio Amaduzzi, includes 54 photographs by Berengo Gardin; 50 pages.
- Ieri e oggi (in Italian). Milan: Fondazione Istituto Sacra Famiglia. 2011. 23 B/W photographs by Berengo Gardin; other photographs by Sirio Magnabosco and Enrico Zuppi; edited by Giovanna Calvenzi. About Sacra Famiglia of Cesano Boscone.
- Castello di Mongiovino. I libri di Jupiter. 2011. 37 B/W photographs by Berengo Gardin; 54 pages.
- Transappenninica. La ferrovia transappenninica, il viaggio, i territori, la gente (in Italian). Porretta Terme: Nuèter. 2011. 15 B/W photographs by Berengo Gardin; other photographs by Mosé Noberto Franchi, Luciano Marchi, Davide Ortombina, Donatella Pollini and Massimo Zanti; text by Gianluigi Colin, Renzo Zagnoni and Mosé Noberto Franchi; 96 pages
- Terra da vivere: Figline Valdarno nelle immagini di Gianni Berengo Gardin (in Italian). Figline Valdarno: Comune di Figline Valdarno. 2011. ISBN 978-88-96698-01-3. 105 B/W photographs by Berengo Gardin, edited by Valerio Iossa; 174 pages. Accompanying an exhibition at Palazzo Pretorio, Figline Valdarno, February–May 2011. About Figline Valdarno.
- Presente! Andrea Martinelli. Prato: Gruppo Editoriale Centro per l'arte contemporanea Luigi Pecci. 2011. ISBN 978-88-6482-001-9. Photographs by Berengo Gardin; 154 pages. About Andrea Martinelli.
- Inediti (o quasi) (in Italian). Rome: Contrasto Due. 2012. ISBN 978-88-6965-350-6. 120 B/W photographs by Berengo Gardin; text by Ferdinando Scianna; contribution by Cesare Zavattini; 147 pages. (Note: Page about Inediti (o quasi), Contrasto.)
- L'Aquila prima e dopo (in Italian). Rome: Contrasto. 2012. ISBN 978-88-6965-353-7. Co-published by One Group in L'Aquila. 140 B/W photographs by Berengo Gardin, 147 pages. About the effects of the 2009 L'Aquila earthquake. (Note: Page about L'Aquila prima e dopo, Contrasto.)
- Almanacco dell'architetto (in Italian). Bologna: Proctor Edizioni. 2012. ISBN 978-88-902467-0-8. 130 B/W photographs by Berengo Gardin; additional photographs by other photographers; texts by Renzo Piano and Carlo Piano; 230 pages.
- Il racconto del riso = An Italian Story of Rice. Rome: Contrasto. 2013. ISBN 978-88-6965-425-1. 206 B/W photographs by Berengo Gardin; text in Italian and English by Carlo Petrini, Gianni Rondolino and Marco Vallora; 307 pages. About rice farming in the Po valley. (Note: Page about Il racconto del riso, Contrasto.)
- Gianni Berengo Gardin. Storie di un fotografo (in Italian). Venice: Marsilio. 2013. ISBN 978-88-317-1873-8. Catalogue of an exhibition held at Casa dei Tre Oci, Venice, February–May 2013. 133 B/W photographs by Berengo Gardin, text by Denis Curti and Italo Zannier; edited by Denis Curti; 205 pages. (Note: Two books with the same title, publisher, and year of publication. The cover photograph of the book accompanying the Venice exhibition is of a couple embracing; that of the book accompanying the Milan exhibition shows people on two balconies.)
  - Gianni Berengo Gardin: Stories of a Photographer. Venice: Marsilio. 2013. ISBN 978-88-317-1501-0.
- Gianni Berengo Gardin. Storie di un fotografo (in Italian). Venice: Marsilio. 2013. ISBN 978-88-317-1696-3. Catalogue of an exhibition held at the Royal Palace of Milan. 180 B/W photographs by Berengo Gardin; text by Denis Curti and Italo Zannier; 181 pages.
- Caffè Florian (in Italian). Venice: Marsilio. 2013. ISBN 978-88-317-1644-4. 40 B/W photographs by Berengo Gardin of Caffè Florian, prefaces by Andrea Formilli Fendi and Stefano Stipitivich, accompanying an exhibition curated by Stipitivich and held at Caffè Florian, September–October 2013; 93 pages.
- Palazzo Madama (in Italian). Turin: Tallone. 2013. Seven B/W photographs by Berengo Gardin; text by Alvar Gonzáles-Palacios; edited by Adele Re Baudengo; 127 pages. About the Palazzo Madama, Turin.
- Self portraits Andrea Martinelli. Florence: Galleria degli Uffizi. 2013. ISBN 978-88-6482-009-5. Eight B/W photographs by Berengo Gardin; 80 pages.
- Polesine (in Italian). Palermo: Istituto Superiore per la Storia della Fotografia. 2013. ISBN 978-88-87928-13-6. 93 B/W photographs by Berengo Gardin; text by Paolo Morello, Laura Negri and Tiziana Virgili; 140 pages.
- Il fiume dei fiumi. Dieci fotografie e il Po (in Italian). Verona: Cierre Edizioni. 2013. On the Po. 11 photographs by Berengo Gardin; other photographs by Stanislao Farri, Pepi Merisio, Ezio Quiresi, Roberto Roda, Roberto Bertoni, Luigi Briselli, Paolo Equisetto, Arrigo Giovannini, Alberto Roveri; 180 pages.
- Bella fuori. Nuovi centri in città. Un metodo, un progetto, le realizzazioni per riqualificare le periferie (in Italian). Bologna: Editrici Compositori. 2013. ISBN 978-88-7794-788-8. 14 photographs by Berengo Gardin; 150 pages.
- Gianni Berengo Gardin. Il libro dei libri (in Italian). Rome: Contrasto. 2014. ISBN 978-88-6965-444-2. Edited by Bruno Carbone, with an introductory essay by Peter Galassi; 311 pages. A book about books by Berengo Gardin. (Note: Page about Il libro dei libri, Contrasto.)
- I volti della psichiatria (in Italian). Cinisello Balsamo, Milan: Silvana. 2014. ISBN 978-88-366-2970-1. Photographs by Berengo Gardin; text by Donatella Pollini and Domenico Nano; 96 pages.
- Un'amicizia ai sali d'argento, fotografie 1950–2014 (in Italian). Rome: Contrasto. 2014. ISBN 978-88-6965-529-6. The friendship in silver chloride of Berengo Gardin and Elliott Erwitt. Tête-bêche binding, "Gianni Berengo Gardin" on one front cover and "Elliott Erwitt" on the other. (Note: Page about Un'amicizia ai sali d'argento, Contrasto.)
- Semicouture. Rome: Contrasto. 2014. ISBN 978-88-6965-576-0. 71 B/W photographs by Berengo Gardin of the workshop of the fashion designer Erika Cavallini; text by Angelo Flaccavento in Italian and English; 120 pages. (Note: Page about Semicouture, Contrasto.)
- Manicomi: psichiatria e antipsichiatria nelle immagini degli anni settanta (in Italian). Rome: Contrasto. 2015. ISBN 978-88-6965-588-3. A fuller selection of the photographs by Berengo Gardin than had appeared in Morire di classe: la condizione manicomiale (1969), omitting photographs by Carla Cerati. (Note: Page about Manicomi, Contrasto.)
- Storie in cucina. Ricordi, racconti e ricette (in Italian). Rome: Contrasto. 2015. ISBN 978-88-6965-602-6. Text by Caterina Stiffoni with 30 B/W photographs by Berengo Gardin. (Note: Page about Storie in cucina, Contrasto.)
- Venezia e le grandi navi (in Italian). Rome: Contrasto. 2015. ISBN 978-88-6965-620-0. 88 pages; 40 B/W photographs by Berengo Gardin. (Note: Page about Venezia e le grandi navi, Contrasto.)
- 9 Photographers for the Planet (in Italian). Rome: Contrasto. 2015. ISBN 978-88-6965-616-3. ISBN 9788869656071. Photographs by Berengo Gardin, Irene Küng, Joel Meyerowitz, Martin Parr, Sebastião Salgado, Alessandra Sanguinetti, Ferdinando Scianna, George Steinmetz, Alex Webb. (Note: Page about 9 Photographers for the Planet, Contrasto.)
- Zanetti, Mario (2015). Antonio Stagnoli nelle fotografie di Gianni Berengo Gardin. Skira. ISBN 9788857230467. Published Milano: Skira; and Bagolino (Brescia): Studio d'arte Zanetti. On the artist Antonio Stagnoli. Text by Franca Grisoni and others, in Italian and English; edited by Mario Zanetti. (Note: Page about Antonio Stagnoli nelle fotografie di Gianni Berengo Gardin, Studio d'arte Zanetti.)
- Gianni Berengo Gardin - vera fotografia: reportage, immagini, incontri (in Italian). Rome: Contrasto. 2016. ISBN 978-88-6965-657-6. Text by Alessandra Mammì and Alessandra Mauro. (Note: Page about Gianni Berengo Gardin - vera fotografia: reportage, immagini, incontri, Contrasto.)
- Il gioco delle perle di Venezia (in Italian). Milan: Rizzoli Lizard. 2016. ISBN 9788817091824. By Berengo Gardin, Marco D'Anna, Hugo Pratt, Marco Steiner. (Note: Page about Il gioco delle perle di Venezia, Rizzoli Lizard.)
- Adolf Vallazza, Gianni Berengo Gardin: opere = Werke = works: 1970–2016. Rome: Contrasto. 2017. ISBN 978-88-6965-558-6. Text in Italian, German and English. (Note: Page about Adolf Vallazza, Gianni Berengo Gardin, Contrasto.)
- Architetture di pietra: fotografie della Sardegna nuragica. Carta per gli occhi (in Italian). Nuoro: Imago. 2017. ISBN 9788889545485. By Berengo Gardin and Marco Minoja. (Note: Iolanda Carollo, "Architetture di pietra: la Sardegna nuragica di Gianni Berengo Gardin", Archeostorie, 18 June 2018.)
- In festa: viaggio nella cultura popolare italiana (in Italian). Rome: Contrasto. 2017. ISBN 978-88-6965-709-2. (Note: Page about In festa, Contrasto.)
- Storia di un libro: Sulle orme di Gianni Berengo Gardin (in Italian). Alpignano (TO): Edizioni Effedì. 2018. ISBN 9788885950092. By Cele Bellardone and Dino Boffa; with a translation, "The interview: Gianni Berengo Gardin in his own words". (Note: Page about Storia di un libro, Edizioni Effedì.)
- La più gioconda veduta del mondo: Venezia da una finestra (in Italian). Rome: Contrasto. 2019. ISBN 978-88-6965-762-7. (Note: Page about La più gioconda veduta del mondo, Contrasto.)
- In parole povere: Immagini, ricordi e incontri (in Italian). Rome: Contrasto. 2019. ISBN 978-88-6965-781-8. An autobiography.
- Isole di ordinaria follia (in Italian). Venice: Marcianum Press. 2019. ISBN 978-88-6512-642-4. Short stories by Marco Steiner, photographs by Berengo Gardin and Marco D'Anna, postface by Antonio Dragonetto. (Note: Page about Isole di ordinaria follia, Marcianum Press.)

== Books about Berengo Gardin ==
- Leica e le altre. Onesti tradimenti di Gianni Berengo Gardin (in Italian). Rome: Peliti Associati. 1998. OCLC 42415921. 48 B/W photographs of Berengo Gardin at work with his various cameras over the years; 64 pages.
- Gianni Berengo Gardin. Testi e pretesti (in Italian). Milan: B. Mondadori. 2009. ISBN 978-88-6159-117-2. Text by Silvana Turzio; 26 B/W photographs by Berengo Gardin; 179 pages.
