= Giovanni Chiaramonte =

Italian photographer (1948–2023)

- Born: 1948; Varese, Italy
- Died: 18 October 2023 (aged 75); Milan, Italy
- Occupation: Photographer

Giovanni Chiaramonte (1948 – 18 October 2023) was an Italian photographer, art theorist, art curator and academic.

== Biography ==
Born in Varese from parents who had moved there from Gela, Sicily, Chiaramonte graduated in philosophy from the Università Cattolica del Sacro Cuore in Milan. He started his professional activity as a photographer in the late 1960s. He held his first expositions in 1974. In 1977, he co-founded with Luigi Ghirri Punto e Virgola, the first Italian publishing house entirely devoted to photography.

Having among his models Hans Urs von Balthasar and Romano Guardini, Chiaramonte's approach to photography aimed at conflating ethics, aesthetics and theology. He considered photography as an instrument of both meditation and knowledge, and as a meeting point between the exteriority of the world and the interiority of the person. Often described as a "photographer of the thought", he gave a strong importance to light, which in his work had a philosophical and even metaphysical metaphorical significance.

Chiaramonte was professor of History and Theory of Photography at the IULM University of Milan and at the University of Palermo. He was also a theorist of photography, an essayist and an art curator. He died in Milan on 18 October 2023, at the age of 75.
