= Luca Campigotto =

Italian artist and photographer

Luca Campigotto (born February 23, 1962) is an Italian artist photographer and writer.

He was born in Venice, where he graduated in modern history. He is known for his images on night citiescapes and wild landscapes. Among his city series are Venice, New York, Chicago, Cairo, Morocco, Angkor, India, Iran, Patagonia, Easter Island, Yemen, and Lapland.

== Books ==
- L'ora blu, Fondazione Capri, 2019
- Matera, Opera Edizioni, San Benedetto del Tronto, 2019
- Disoriente, Postcart Edizioni, Rome, 2018
- Venezia, storie d'acqua, texts by Tiziano Scarpa, Silvana Editoriale, Milan, 2018
- Iconic China, texts by W. M. Hunt, Damiani, Bologna, 2017
- Le règles de la vision, texts by François Hébel and Walter Guadagnini, Italian Cultural Institute, Paris 2016
- ROMA. Un impero alle radici dell'Europa, texts by Louis Godart and Livio Zerbini, Silvana Editoriale, Milan 2015
- Theatres of War, texts by Lyle Rexer, Mario Isnenghi, Marco Meneguzzo, Gustavo Pietropolli Charmet, Silvana, Milan 2014
- Gotham City, text by Marvin Heiferman, Damiani, Bologna 2012
- 50+1, text by Domenico De Masi, Alinari 24 Ore, Milan 2012
- My Wild Places, text by Walter Guadagnini, Hatje Cantz, Ostfildern 2010
- The Stones of Cairo, text by Achille Bonito Oliva, Peliti Associati, Roma 2007
- Venicexposed, text by Henry James, Contrasto, Rome/Thames & Hudson, London/La Martinière, Paris 2006
- L’Arsenale di Venezia, text by Gino Benzoni, Marsilio, Venice 2000
- Molino Stucky, Marsilio, text by Massimo Cacciari, Venice 1998
- Venetia Obscura, text by Gino Benzoni, Peliti Associati, Roma/Dewi Lewis, Stockport/Marval, Paris 1995

== Essays ==
- Al-Qāhirah: Luca Campigotto in Egitto, by Flaminio Gualdoni, FMR nr.17 2007
- Fotografare significa trattenere il respiro, by Achille Bonito Oliva, Obiettivo Napoli, Electa, Naples 2005
- L'immagine fotografica in Italia, by Uliano Lucas e Tatiana Agliani, Storia d'Italia, Annali 20, Einaudi, Turin 2004
- Indugiare sul mondo con compassione, Abitare, nr. 455, 2005
- Fotologia nr. 20, edited Italo Zannier, Fratelli Alinari, Firenze 1999
- Luca Campigotto, edited by Francesca Fabiani, Fotografia-Le collezioni, MAXXI Architettura, Electa, Rome 2010
- The impossibility of forgetting, by Gustavo Pietropolli Charmet Fuori di casa, Imagina, Venice 1998
- VenicExposed, by Harvey Goldstein, Rangefinder Magazine, January 2007

== Exhibitions ==
- Iconic China, Palazzo Zen, Venice 2017
- The Empire of the Night, Bugno Art Gallery, Venice 2016
- Theatres of War - Teatri di guerra, Doge's Palace, Venice - Museo del Vittoriano, Rome 2014
- Gotham and Beyond, Laurence Miller Gallery, New York, 2013
- My Wild Places, Fortuny Palace, Venice 2010-11
- Landscapes as Memory, Bugno Art Gallery, Venice 2009
- Collective shows: Mois de la Photo, Paris 2006; CCA, Montreal 1998; The Art Museum, Miami 1999; The Warehouse, Miami 2008; MAXXI, Rome 2010; 47' Venice Biennale 1997; 54' Venice Biennale 2011; Festival della Fotografia, Rome 2006, 2007; MEP, Paris 2007; Galleria Gottardo, Lugano 1998; IVAM, Valencia 2003 .

== Collections ==
- Maison Européenne de la Photographie, Paris
- Canadian Centre for Architecture, Montreal
- The Progressive Collection, Cleveland
- The Margulies Collection at the Warehouse, Miami
- The Sagamore Collection, Miami
- UniCredit Group Collection, Milan
- Fondazione Sandretto Re Rebaudengo, Turin
- Fondazione Cassa di Risparmio di Modena, Modena
- Metropolitana, Naples
- Palazzo Fortuny, Venice
