= Carla Cerati =

Italian photographer and writer (1926–2016)

- Born: 3 March 1926; Bergamo
- Died: 19 February 2016 (aged 89); Milan
- Known for: photography of Milanese high society
- Notable work: Mondo Cocktail; Forma di donna

Carla Cerati (3 March 1926 Bergamo – 19 February 2016 Milan) was an Italian photographer and writer. She began her career focusing on social and cultural issues through her lens. Her work often depicted the bourgeois lifestyle of Milanese high society, and she was known for capturing intimate moments with her subjects. In 1974, she published Mondo Cocktail, a photo book showcasing the lavish cocktail parties of Milan's elite, and in 1978, she released Forma di donna, a collection of nude female portraits. She also worked as a fashion photographer and collaborated with various publications throughout her career. Cerati died in 2020, leaving a compelling and thought-provoking photography legacy.

== Life ==
In 1960, she began working as a still photographer, then devoted herself to reportage and portraiture. In 1962, she published her first works as a professional photographer, a report on Milanese schools, in the pages of the weekly L'Illustration Italiana, directed by Gaetano Tumiati. In the early 1960s, she frequented the "Milanese Photographic Club" circles, an important point of reference for Italian photographic associations (founded in 1930), and in the following years, she published some photographs in Italian periodicals such as Vie nuove and L'Espresso.

At the theatre, she photographed the comedy Nothing for Love by Oreste del Buono and the performances of the Compagnia dei Quattro by Franco Enriquez. Between 1967 and 1968, she photographed the Living Theater of Julian Beck and Judith Malina, in particular Antigone, Frankenstein and Paradise Now, the latter on the occasion of its international premiere at the Avignon Festival.

In 1969, the Einaudi publishing house published the book, Dying of class. The asylum condition photographed by Carla Cerati and Gianni Berengo Gardin edited by Franco Basaglia and Franca Basaglia Ongaro, where photographs were taken in the Italian psychiatric hospitals of Gorizia, Florence, Parma and Ferrara. Thanks to this project, with the passage of the law 13 May 1978 n. 180 (also known as the Basaglia Law) in favor of closing the asylums, the two photographers won the Palazzi Prize for reportage. In 1998, the volume was republished with the title Lest we forget 1968. The asylum reality of «To die of class.

Between the 1960s and 1970s, Cerati portrayed many personalities from the world of Italian and international culture and photographed some of the most important political and social events in Milan, such as the ongoing trial between Commissioner Luigi Calabresi and Lotta Continua, the feminist struggles, and the funeral of Giangiacomo Feltrinelli.

In 1974, she collaborated with publisher Amilcare Pizzi to release the photo book Mondo Cocktail. Maria Livia Serini provided an introductory note for the book, which featured 61 photographs depicting the affluent lifestyle of Milanese cocktail parties. In 1978, Mazzotta published the photo book Forma di donna, containing 34 photographs of female nudes.

As a writer, she made her debut in 1973 with the novel A fraternal love. In 1975, she published the novel A perfect marriage, finalist for the Campiello Prize. In 1977, she wrote the sentimental condition with which she won the Radio Montecarlo Award. In 1990, she published Her bad daughter, which won the Comisso Prize. In 1992, with The Loss of Diego, she became a finalist for the Strega Prize, while in 1996, with The Modeller's Friend, she won the Alghero National Prize for Literature and Journalism in the narrative section. In 2004, she published the autobiographical novel L'intruso.

== Works ==
- Cerati, Carla (1992). La perdita di Diego. Milano: Frassinelli. ISBN 88-7684-205-5. OCLC 30437877.
- —— (1993). Un amore fraterno. Milano: Frassinelli. ISBN 88-7684-237-3. OCLC 37862963.
- —— (1994). Legami molto stretti. Milano: Frassinelli. ISBN 88-7684-271-3. OCLC 31521378.
- —— (1996). L'amica della modellista. [Milano]: Frassinelli. ISBN 88-7684-388-4. OCLC 34849534.
- —— (1996). La cattiva figlia (1. Frassinelli Tascabili ed.). [Milano]: Frassinelli. ISBN 88-7684-396-5. OCLC 34892684.
- —— (1997). Milano 1960-1970. Manduria: Barbieri. ISBN 88-86187-41-6. OCLC 38546175.
- —— (1997). Il sogno della bambina : uno e l'altro. [Lieu de publication non identifié]: Frassinelli. ISBN 88-7684-487-2. OCLC 421853803.
- —— (1998). Grand Hotel Riviera. [Milano]: Frassinelli. ISBN 88-7684-499-6. OCLC 39023633.
- —— (2001). La seconda occasione. Milano: Frassinelli. ISBN 88-7684-647-6. OCLC 47396038.
- —— (2004). L'intruso (1 ed.). Venezia: Marsilio. ISBN 88-317-8401-3. OCLC 56820013.
- —— (2005). Un matrimonio perfetto. Cesare De Michelis (1 ed.). Venezia: Marsilio. ISBN 883178787X. OCLC 1302545356.
- —— (2005). Una donna del nostro tempo (1 ed.). Venezia: Tascabili Marsilio. ISBN 88-317-8790-X. OCLC 62754706.
- —— (2007). Carla Cerati : nudi. Paolo Morello. Palermo: Istituto superiore per la storia della fotografia. ISBN 978-88-87928-11-2. OCLC 173263778.
- —— (2008). Un uovo ... una frittatona : dal quaderno di cucina del tempo di guerra : 121 ricette antispreco e un racconto. Milano: Blu edizioni. ISBN 978-88-7904-056-3. OCLC 868531102.
- —— (2008). L'emiliana. Venezia: Marsilio. ISBN 978-88-317-9497-8. OCLC 232963464.
- —— (2013). L'eredità : idee e canzoni di un sessantottino : Federico Ceratti. Venezia: Marsilio. ISBN 978-88-317-1456-3. OCLC 820120832.

With others

- Berengo Gardin, Gianni (1998). Per non dimenticare : 1968 : la realtà manicomiale di Morire di classe. Carla Cerati, Franca Ongaro Basaglia. Torino: Gruppo Abele. ISBN 88-7670-309-8. OCLC 801125903.</ref>
- Vázquez Montalbán, Manuel (1999). Gli allegri ragazzi di Atzavara. Cles, tipografo trentino Mondadori. [Milano]: Milano. ISBN 88-7684-560-7. OCLC 797524283.
