= Palazzo Penotti Ubertini =

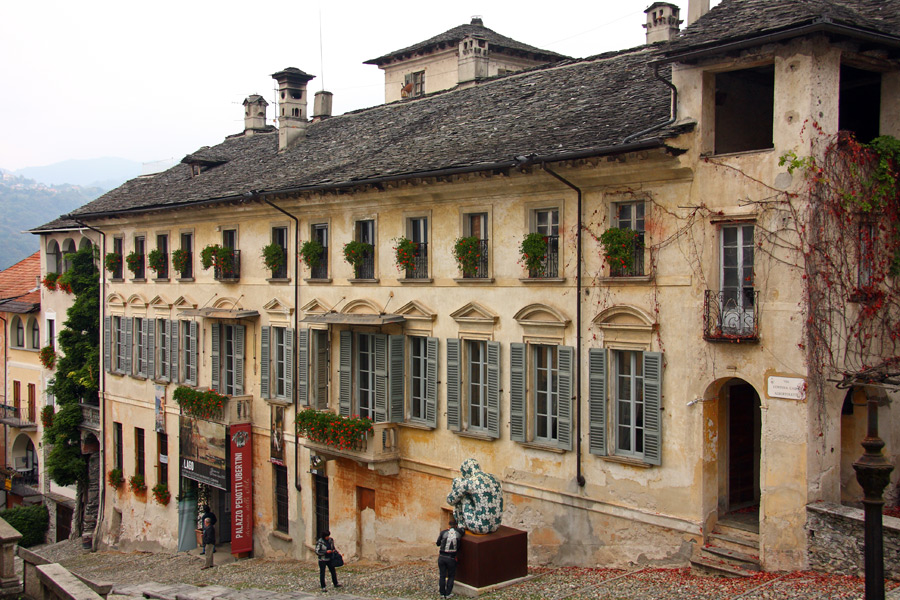
- Palazzo Penotti Ubertini in 2010
- Click on the map for a fullscreen view

General information
- Location: Orta San Giulio, Italy
- Coordinates: 45°47′54.8″N 8°24′24.9″E

Palazzo Penotti Ubertini is a historic building located in Orta San Giulio, Italy.

== History ==
Construction of the building began in the early 18th century and was completed in 1747 and commissioned by the Gemelli family. The property later passed by inheritance to the De Forte family, originally from Venice, who had taken refuge in Orta San Giulio during the Napoleonic era. It was subsequently inherited by the Penotti family, jurists and notaries in the area around Lake Orta, and later by the Ubertini family.

== Description ==
The building, located in the centre of the village of Orta San Giulio, on the Salita della Motta leading to the church of Santa Maria Assunta, features an imposing Neoclassical façade with two balconies in the central section.

== Gallery ==
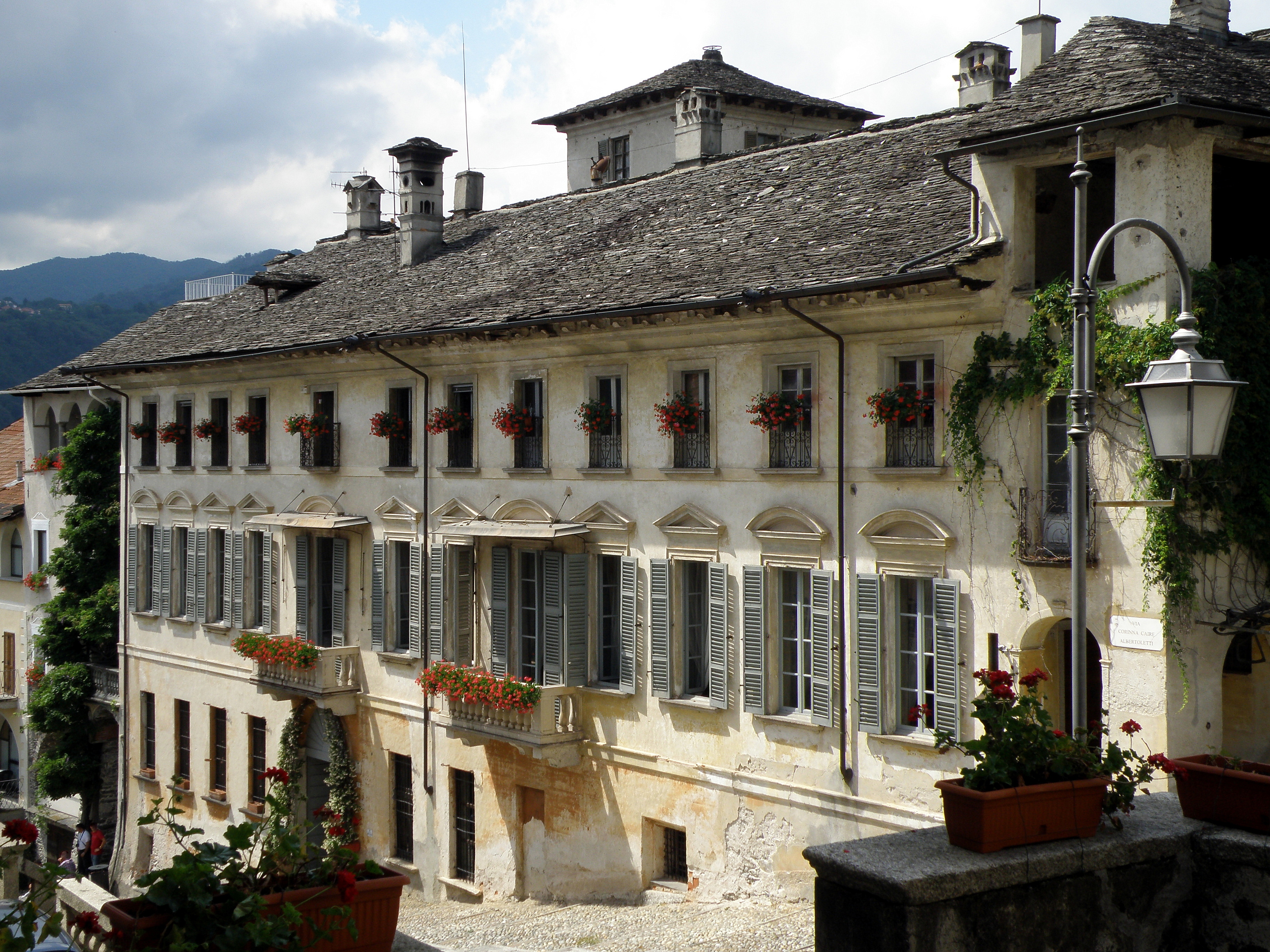

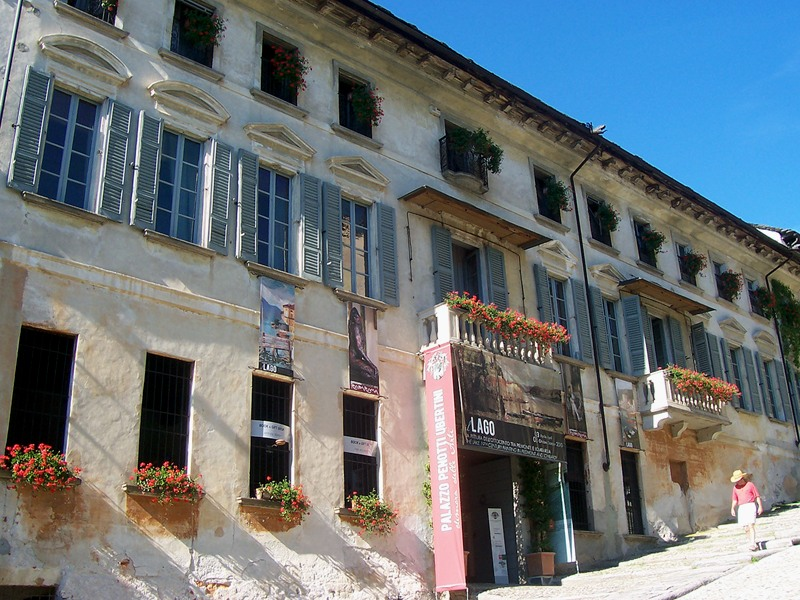

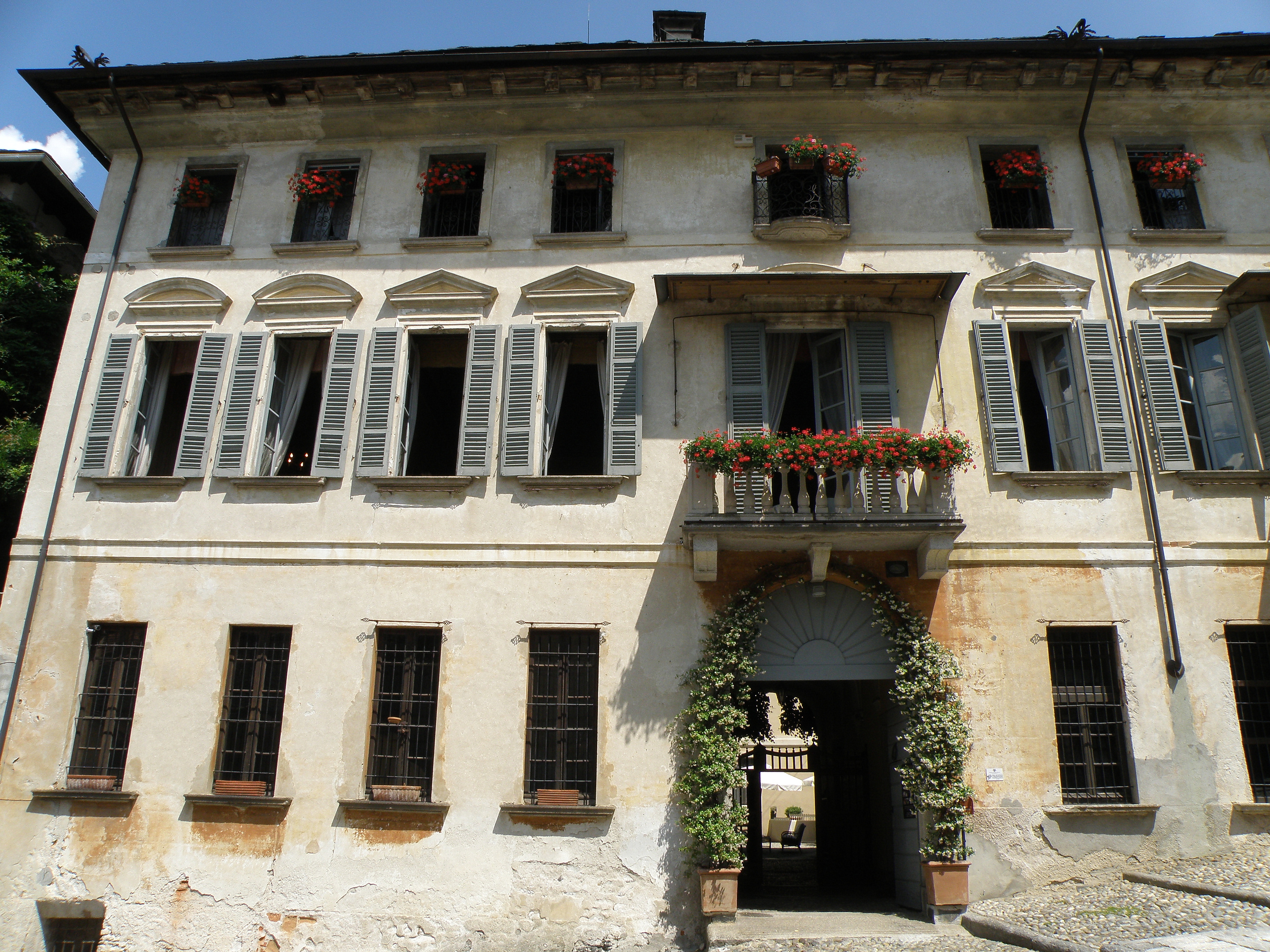
