= Carmelo Bongiorno =

Italian photographer

Born in Sicily, Carmelo Bongiorno began photographing in 1978 by focusing primarily on his island, he photographs in black and white.

== Early career ==
From 1982, after his studies, he decided to devote himself exclusively to photography, and, in 1983, he founded with his friends and Carmelo Mangione Carmelo Nicosia, the artistic experimentation group Gruppo Fase and leads artistic experimentation of the basis of an incorrect use of the photographic technique. It is far from the classical canons of documentary photography, to produce highly personal images, in which his taste for the dark, looking for particular lights of dusk, express a vision that does not try to show a place or an event, but the personal experience of the author.

In 1989, his work was rewarded at the Rencontres d'Arles by the award of the Grand Prix Kodak for young European photography and he published in 1992 his first monograph, Luoghi Privati, edited by Ken Damy and the photography museum of Brescia.

In 1993, he participated with eight other photographers, including Raymond Depardon, Bernard Descamps, Jean-Pierre Favreau, Max Pam, Jeanloup Sieff, and Martine Voyeux on a collective project entitled Roads milk, in which photographers testify in different countries around the world (Italy, Niger, Japan, India, France (Savoie), Pakistan, China, England) of the universality of this nutrient liquid. The result of this order was exhibited at the National Library in Paris in May 1994 and published in a book edited by Contrejour editions.

In 1997, he published L'isola intima (Ed. SEI, Turin), an inner journey through the places of his native island, which brings together photographs taken during seven years (1988–1995) with a preface by Franco Battiato. For this work he received, in 1999, the Enzo Barbarino prize, as a major author of the "new Italian photography".

In 1998, he exhibited as part of the Month of Photography in Paris, his "enigmatic Sicilian atmospheres", in the words of journalist Armelle Canitrot, at the Italian Cultural Institute, housed in the Hotel Galliffet.

== Later career ==
In 2000, the Piccolo Teatro invited him, along with Wim Wenders, Ugo Mulas and Duane Michals, to present a solo exhibition as part of an event called Teatro della Visione. In 2001, he published Bagliori 1995–2000 with Federico Motta Editore in Milan, which accompanies an exhibition that travels across Italy and Europe.

In 2002, he was invited by Jean Dieuzaide to present to the Castle Gallery of Water in Toulouse a retrospective exhibition of his photographs on Sicily, drawn largely from Isola intima, resulting in the publication of a catalogue.

The same year, the Milan Triennale invited him to exhibit as part of Città Invisibili, a large exhibition dedicated to Italo Calvino.

In 2003, he exhibited in Biarritz.

In 2005, he proposed a facility with large pictures on the old walls of Toulouse for the project "Desire". He was one of the authors selected by the Peggy Guggenheim Collection in Venice for the exhibition I Maestri della Fotografia (Masters of Photography), an exhibition sponsored by the 3M Foundation to celebrate the historical activities of Lanfranco Colombo and his gallery.

In 2006, through a public order, he produces and presents at the ParolaVisioni modern art gallery the exhibit, Le Ciminiere of Catania.

In 2007, the Sicilian Regional Assembly calls for Carmelo Bongiorno to celebrate the 60th anniversary of its creation in 1947. For this project, he photographed the faces marked by time of seventy men and women who were 21 in 1947 to recount the sixty years of the history of Sicily through the faces, the looks and the smiles of those who have personally seen the birth of the Assembly and that shortly after the end of World War II, participated in the election of the first Sicilian parliament. Nine of these images - one for each province - were selected for the campaign of promoting culture and image designed for the celebrations and were displayed on the walls of Palermo and cities of Sicily.

In 2008, he published Note di luce. Nell'anima Viaggio del Teatro Massimo Bellini, the result of photographic work from one year on the world of classical music and opera, directed by an order of the Teatro Massimo Bellini of Catania, where the photographs were exhibited.

His last work published in 2010, is Voci. In his presentation of the book, the publisher emphasizes that "this experiment results in a lonely journey, which among the mastery of light and the expression of an existential malaise in which blend shapes and figures, puts focus on the inner experience of their passions and anxieties."

He has taught at the Academy of Fine Arts, Catania. Bongiorno's works are held in the Museum of Contemporary Photography, Milan.
