= Paolo Gioli =

Italian painter and photographer (1942–2022)

- Born: 12 October 1942; Rovigo, Italy
- Died: 28 January 2022 (aged 79); Lendinara, Italy
- Occupations: Painter, photographer, director
- Years active: 1960–2022

Paolo Gioli (12 October 1942 – 28 January 2022) was an Italian painter, photographer, and experimental film director.

Gioli was born in northeastern Kingdom of Italy and attended the Academy of Fine Arts in Venice. Early influences include Hans Richter and Walter Ruttman. He did not take an interest in film until he lived in New York in 1967, where he discovered the New American Cinema school of filmmaking. Gioli died on 28 January 2022, at the age of 79.
