= Mimmo Jodice =

Italian photographer (1934–2025)

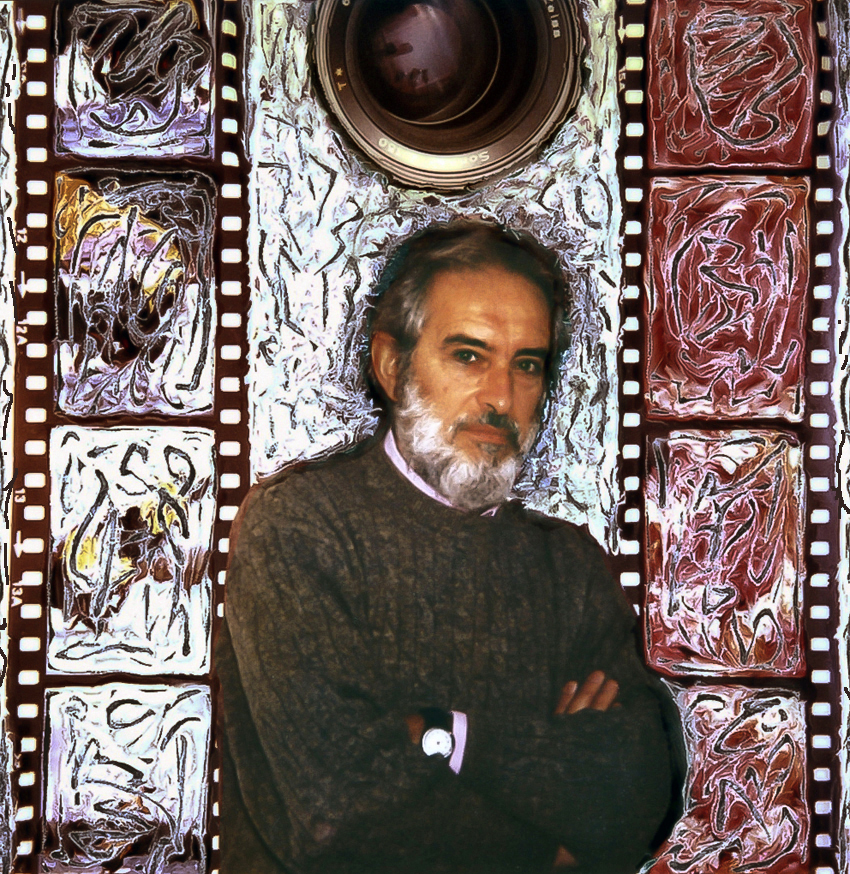
Manipulated photopolaroid by Augusto De Luca, taken from the book "Neapolitans of the end of the century", Electa Napoli – 1995.

Domenico "Mimmo" Jodice (29 March 1934 – 27 October 2025) was an Italian photographer. He was a professor at the Accademia di Belle Arti di Napoli from 1970 to 1996.

== Life and career ==
Jodice was born in Naples on 29 March 1934. From the 1960s on Jodice worked with many artists of various styles like Pop art, Arte Povera or Fluxus. As a documentary photographer of conceptual art Jodice made photographs of artists, e.g. Andy Warhol, Joseph Beuys, and Robert Rauschenberg. Later he focussed on landscape, and sceneries. In that field Jodice became one of the significant Italian photographers. Jodice dealt mainly with Italian landscapes and cities, using exclusively black-and-white films. Jodice worked on the concept of time, connecting the old and the new, such as run-down monuments and views of modern cities. An example is the series LOST IN SEEING. Dreams and Visions of Italy, whose effect is described by the essayist Alessandro Mauro as follows: "In Jodice’s work silence takes over places and the photographs become metaphysical visions, an interweaving of the signs of the past as they return to inhabit the present". Very well known are the views on Jodice's home town Naples, for example the series Naples: une archéologie future.

Jodice died on 27 October 2025, at the age of 91.

== Exhibitions ==
Among many exhibitions worldwide, Jodice's works are exhibited at the Aperture Foundation in New York, the Philadelphia Museum of Art, the San Francisco Museum of Modern Art, the Maison Européenne de la Photographie in Paris, and the Museo d'Arte Contemporanea in Turin.

== Awards ==
Jodice won the Feltrinelli Prize (photography) in 2003.
