= Italo Zannier =

Italian art historian and photographer (1932–2026)

Italo Zannier (9 June 1932 – 27 October 2026) was an Italian art historian, photographer, academic and historian of photography.

== Life and career ==
Italo Zannier was born 9 June 1932 in Spilimbergo, in the region of Friuli-Venezia Giulia.

First in Italy to hold a chair of "history of photography" he taught at IUAV and at the Faculty of Letters of Ca 'Foscari University also in Venice, he also taught at Dams in Bologna and at the Faculty of Cultural Heritage of Ravenna and at the Catholic University of Milan. He was a member of the "Sociètè europeènne d'histoire de la photographie". He published more than 500 books between historical and scientific catalogs and publications. He had an honorary degree in Conservation of cultural heritage from the University of Udine. President of the scientific committees of the Alinari Museum of the History of Photography in Florence and of the Lestans Photography Research and Archiving Center, which he founded in 1994. Curator of dozens of exhibitions, including the one on the Mediterranean landscape organized in Seville on the occasion of the Expo 1992 is the photographic section of Italian Metamorphosis, the great exhibition dedicated to Italian art from the Guggenheim in New York in 1994. He also edited the photography section at various editions of the Venice Art Biennale including the last one in 2011 and at the Venice Architecture Biennale. Many great contemporary Italian photographers owe his fame as a popularizer [without source]. He taught photography at the Advanced Industrial Design Course in Venice, the first Italian Industrial Design School in the early 1960s.

Italo Zannier died on 27 October 2026, aged 94.

== Works (selection) ==
- Pompilio; Zannier (2004). Percorsi veneziani. Foto in bianco e nero. Venezia: Corbo e Fiore Editori.
- Esposizione internazionale d'arte di Venezia (1995). Italo Zannier (ed.). L'io e il suo doppio: un secolo di ritratto fotografico in Italia, 1895-1995. con la collaborazione del Direttore del Settore Arti visive della Biennale Jean Clair, Susanna Weber e Daniela Cammilli. Firenze: Alinari. pp. 147–148 e 232. ISBN 88-7292-188-0.
- Fotogiornalismo in Italia oggi, Quaderni di Fotografia 1. Venezia: Corbo e Fiore editori. 1993.
- Leggere la fotografia. Roma: La Nuova Italia Scientifica. 1993.
- L'occhio della fotografia. Protagonisti, tecniche e stili dell'"invenzione maravigliosa". Roma: La Nuova Italia Scientifica. 1988.
- Storia e tecnica della fotografia. Bari: Laterza. 1982.
- 70 anni di fotografia in Italia. Modena: Punto & Virgola. 1978.

== Bibliography on Italo Zannier ==
- Chiesa Pierre Guillemot Michel; Guia Boni (2001). Dizionario di fotografia. Milano: Rizzoli. ISBN 88-17-86769-1.
