= Luigi Ghirri =

Italian artist and photographer

Luigi Ghirri (5 January 1943 – 14 February 1992) was an Italian artist and photographer whose work was about the relationship between fiction and reality. Ghirri has been the subject of numerous books. His works are held by various museums around the world and have been exhibited in the 2011 Venice Biennale and at MAXXI in Rome.

== Life and work ==
Ghirri was born in Scandiano near Reggio Emilia, Italy, on 5 January 1943.

He started his career in the 1970s. Influenced by conceptual art, he created his first two series, Atlante (1973) and Kodachrome (1978), where his cropped images of the landscape were presented with a deadpan, often ironic wit and a continuous anthropological engagement with his surroundings. The compositions and hues of his photographs suggested subtle emotional tones and a meticulously rich way of viewing the world, as well as the role of images within it.

Ghirri's work quickly attracted international attention. In 1975 Time-Life included him in its list of the "Discoveries" of its annual Photography Year publication, and he showed at the Photography as Art, Art as Photography exhibition in Kassel. In 1982 he was invited to the photokina in Cologne, where he was acclaimed as one of the twenty most significant photographers of the 20th century for his series Topographie-Iconographie. In 1989 he made a series shot in the studio of painter Giorgio Morandi.

He died of a heart attack at the age of 49 in Roncocesi, Province of Reggio Emilia, Italy on 14 February 1992.

== Publications ==
- Kodachrome. Self-published / Punto e Virgola, 1978.
  - London: Mack, 2012. ISBN 9781907946240. With an essay by Francesco Zanot in Italian, English, French and German; and translations of the original texts in French and German.
- Italian Landscape/Paesaggio Italiano (no.11 in the book series Lotus Documents directed by Pierluigi Nicolin), Hamburg: Gingko Press, 1989; Comprises 83 colour plates and 14 essays and interviews by Ghirri and various contributors. 128pp. ISBN 9788890022944
- Il Profilo Delle Nuvole. Immagini di un Paesaggio Italiano. Milan: Feltrinelli, 1996. ISBN 978-8807420573
- Atlante. Charta, 2000. ISBN 978-8881582648.
- Luigi Ghirri. Lezioni di fotografia: Quodlibet, 2010. Text in Italian. ISBN 9788874623129
- Niente di antico sotto il sole. Torino: SEI, 1997; The Complete Essays. London: Mack, 2016. ISBN 9781910164143.
- Luigi Ghirri. The Complete Essays: Mack, 2016. Text in English and Italian. ISBN 978-1-910164-14-3
- Luigi Ghirri. Tokyo: Taka Ishii, 2017. Text in English and Japanese. ISBN 978-4908526114
- Luigi Ghirri. Colazione sull'erba: Mack, 2019. Text in English and Italian. ISBN 978-1912339075
- Luigi Ghirri. Niente di antico sotto il sole: Quodlibet, 2021. Text in Italian. ISBN 9788822906144
- Luigi Ghirri. Puglia. Tra albe e tramonti: Mack, 2022. Text in English and Italian. ISBN 978-1-913620-35-6

== Exhibitions ==
=== Solo exhibitions ===
- Luigi Ghirri, curated by Manfred Willmann, Fotogalerie im Forum Stadtpark, Graz, Austria, 1976.
- Paesaggio Italiano (Italian Landscape), organised by the Assessorato alla Cultura del Comune di Reggio Emilia, Reggio Emilia, Italy, 1989.
- It’s Beautiful Here, Isn’t It…, Aperture Foundation, New York City, 2008/09.
- Kodachrome, Matthew Marks Gallery, New York City, 2013.
- Luigi Ghirri ‘Thinking Images’ Icons, Landscapes, Architectures, MAXXI, Rome, 2013; Brazil; Reggio Emilia, Italy, 2014. A retrospective, curated by Francesca Fabiani, Laura Gasparini, and Giuliano Sergio.
- The Map and the Territory (Cartes et Territoires), Museum Folkwang, Essen, 2018; Museo Reina Sofía, Madrid, 2018/19; Jeu de paume, Paris, 2019. Curated by James Lingwood.
- Luigi Ghirri (non) luoghi, Palazzo Bisaccioni, Jesi, 2022.

=== Group exhibitions ===
- Photography as Art, Art as Photography, Kassel, 1975.
- ILLUMInations, Venice Biennale, Venice, Italy, 2011. Group exhibition, curated by Bice Curiger.
- Luigi Ghirri/Aldo Rossi: Things Which Are Only Themselves, Canadian Centre for Architecture, Montreal, Canada, 1996. Curated by Paolo Costantini.
- Photokina, Cologne, Germany, 1982.

== Collections ==
Ghirri's work is held in the following permanent collections:

- Stedelijk Museum, Amsterdam
- Museo di fotografia contemporanea, Milan, Italy
- Bibliothèque nationale de France, Paris
- Canadian Centre for Architecture, Montreal, Canada
- Museum of Fine Arts, Houston, TX
- Museum of Modern Art, New York City

== See also ==
- Gianni Celati
- Guido Guidi (photographer)
- Italia in Miniatura – a miniature park in Rimini that Ghirri photographed extensively
