= Mombello Psychiatric Hospital =

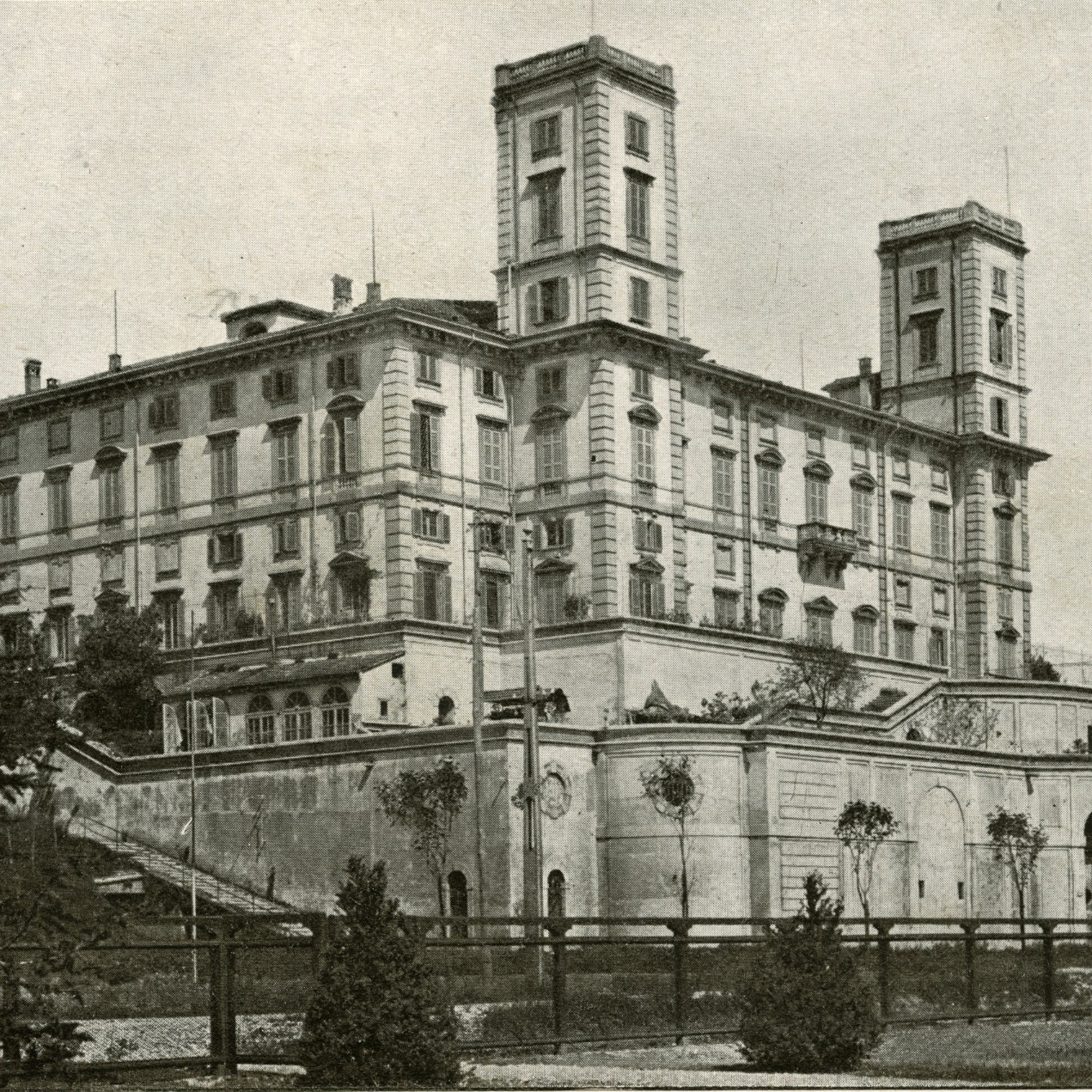
- Hospital on stamp from 1860

- Location in Italy

Geography
- Location: Via Monte Grappa 40, Mombello, Limbiate, Lombardy, Italy
- Coordinates: 45°36′51″N 09°6′59″E

Organisation
- Type: Specialist

Services
- Emergency department: I Mental Illness
- Beds: 3500
- Speciality: Psychiatric hospital

History
- Founded: 1865
- Closed: 1978

Links
- Lists: Hospitals in Italy
- Building details

General information
- Architectural style: Medieval style
- Location: Via Monte Grappa 40, province of Monza and Brianza, Lombardy
- Completed: 1867

Technical details
- Floor area: 40,000 m^{2} (9.9 acres)

Design and construction
- Architect: Francesco Croce

The Mombello Psychiatric Hospital, also known as the Giuseppe Antonini of Limbiate Psychiatric Hospital, was the largest asylum in Italy, covering 40,000 m^{2} (430,000 sq ft) with multiple buildings located as to form a small village. It is located in the Italian commune of Limbiate, in the administrative district of Monza and Brianza, Lombard Province. Officially inaugurated in 1878, it was the last psychiatric hospital to be closed after the approval of the Legge Basaglia in 1978.

== History ==
=== The beginnings ===
In 1865, after the Italian unification, several factors created the need for additional regional hospital capacity. Cholera was widespread, and existing psychiatric hospitals, such as Senavra (a caring institution located in Milan), were overcrowded. Enhancements in modern psychiatry and the development of society after the unification process contributed to the creation of the building.

In 1797, Villa Pusterla-Crivelli, nearly seventy years before becoming the venue of the hospital, hosted the Bonapartes. In August 1865, approximately 60 patients were moved from Senavra to Villa Pusterla in Mombello, which had been chosen to be the location of the new hospital. In October 1867, the Mombello Psychiatric Hospital's total patients amount was 300: 150 women and 150 men, separated by gender. Cesare Castiglioni, the expert and director of Senavra, with Andrea Verga and Serafino Biffi from the "Psychiatric School of Milan", planned Mombello as an agricultural institution for peaceful patients and people who didn't need any special care. Following the decision of the province of Milan to convert Mombello into a provincial asylum, development and enlargement works were completed between 1873 and 1878 (the official opening year). Consequently, thousands of people were admitted. The building facility was shaped like a “village”: it housed patients, scientific laboratories, medical libraries, and areas dedicated to patients, like sewing rooms, craft shops, and gardens. Comparable to every other Italian psychiatric hospital, patients were split into groups according to their behavior, not on their diagnostic category. One of these groups, the "Agitated ones", were kept in isolation, while the rest of them, the majority, were employed in Occupational therapy activities, the scientific name for working therapy.

At the end of the 19th century, after the designation of Edoardo Gonzales as the new director, theatrical performances and dances were introduced to highlight the significance of "moral education" in mental hospital care. Some journalists who were invited to these events wrote about them later in the local papers. In the early 20th century, Gonzales, who stayed in the position of director for eleven years, built an aqueduct that provided water to the asylum as well as to the town of Limbiate. In addition to this, he came up with the so-called "children's department", in which a school was equipped with furniture coming from Montessori, who was a children psychiatrist in the asylum. In the 1920s, Giuseppe Corberi was entrusted with the "children's department". His daughter, Elisa, who was hardly in her twenties, worked there as a volunteer teacher.

The aim of the Psychiatric Hospital was to create a free psychologic-social and cultural environment. The "activities" organized inside the hospital covered different fields of methods, such as artistic, habitational, and recreational. These projects created a deeper connection between the patients and the nature.

In 1908 four “open pavilions” were set up without boundary walls; each one was able to host 100 places for sleeping in the neighboring Mombello pinewood, which was already owned by the administrator.

=== World War I ===
During World War I, Mombello's director was Giuseppe Antonini. At this time, two pavilions were equipped as military hospitals with care, research, and observation of troops from the front impacted by conflict-related psychological traumas. The “Veneto Pavillion” was built to host 250 war refugees.

These independently detached buildings had sleeping accommodations for 200 patients in the army's care. In their first year of activity, 635 soldiers were admitted, and 517 of them were released. On average, 150 in-patients were housed at a time in the asylum, and they were treated through different psychotherapeutic methods, such as clinotherapy (rest therapy), freedom (no forced restraint, such as the use of a Straitjacket), and a dietary “reforming” regime (this method increased the patient's weight by an average of 10–15 kg). Like the majority of in-patients, soldiers were forced to work, including building a street to connect the control pavilion (south-east) to the “pinewood pavilions”.

Soldiers were not the only patients during World War I. After the Battle of Caporetto, the Military Healthiness Department ordered the emptying of all the psychiatric hospitals in Venice. The Mombello hospital hosted these displaced patients and other refugees. This function was repeated during World War II and after the Polesine floods of 1951.

In addition to increasing the number of hospital patients, several of the soldiers, doctors, nurses, and employees who were in-patients, then moved to the front. The psychiatrist Gaetano Perusini (famous for cooperating with Alois Alzheimer to observe and describe "Alzheimer's disease"), had been a doctor at Mombello before his death in the combat in December 1915, in San Floriano.

There was an extraordinary journalistic research in this period: the historian, dialect poet, and painter Antonio Curti, who was friends with Tranquillo Cremona and with Giuseppe Antonini, visited Mombello on the eve of Italy's entrance to the war to see what internees thought about the conflict. On 5, May 1915, the Milanese newspaper, La Perseveranza, published the internees' answers, and later, as a separate flyer.

During World War I, overcrowding became a problem as the number of inmates exceeded 3000. It was decided to open a few branches in Busto Arsizio, like the Villa Litta Modignani (1919), later in Contegno (1928) and in Parabiago with the "Leonardo Bianchi" women's section (1935).

=== 1920s to closure ===
Within the scientific cabinets, the most significant ones were the Pathological Anatomy and Biological Laboratories that together formed the Andrea Verga Institute, the Experimental Psychology Laboratory which was directed by Giuseppe Corberi and the Neurobiological Research Institute in Affori which was directed by Ugo Cerletti, who later discovered the electroshock.

Mombello and the young Milanese Institute reached an agreement in 1931 for creating a university department in the asylum (which operated until 1943). The goal was to give the Clinic for Nervous and Mental Diseases (whose director was Carlo Besta) patients to study on. In the school section in Mombello, forty places were available for patients: 20 for men and 20 for women. In this department, many notorious doctors worked, such as Arrigo Frigerio, Davide Alessi, Rinaldo Grisoni and Silvio Brambilla.

Following the World War II, Mombello's fall begun, when the Province of Milan decided to benefit the new department in Affori, which in 1945 was named after Paolo Pini, a psychiatrist who died in the same year.

With more than 3000 in-patients, Mombello has been one of the largest and most important psychiatric hospitals in Italy. It was visited from the second half of the 19th century by psychiatrists from all over the world: Germany, Romania, Spain, and Egypt. Different painters were welcomed in the Mombello hospital. One of those was Gino Sandri, who drew many paintings inside the asylum. Because many patients were artists, the journalist Antonio Curti renamed the department “The Brera of Mombello”.

The hospital was officially closed in 1978, as a consequence of Law 180, also known as Legge Basaglia. This law also closed all the other psychiatric hospitals in Italy. It subsequently took a further 20 years to discharge every long-term patients and permanently vacate the structure.

During the following years of the closing of the hospital, the government tried to preserve the building from an architectural point of view, to commemorate the hospital, the staff and the important role it had in the past.

=== Gazzetta del Manicomio della Provincia di Milano Mombello ===
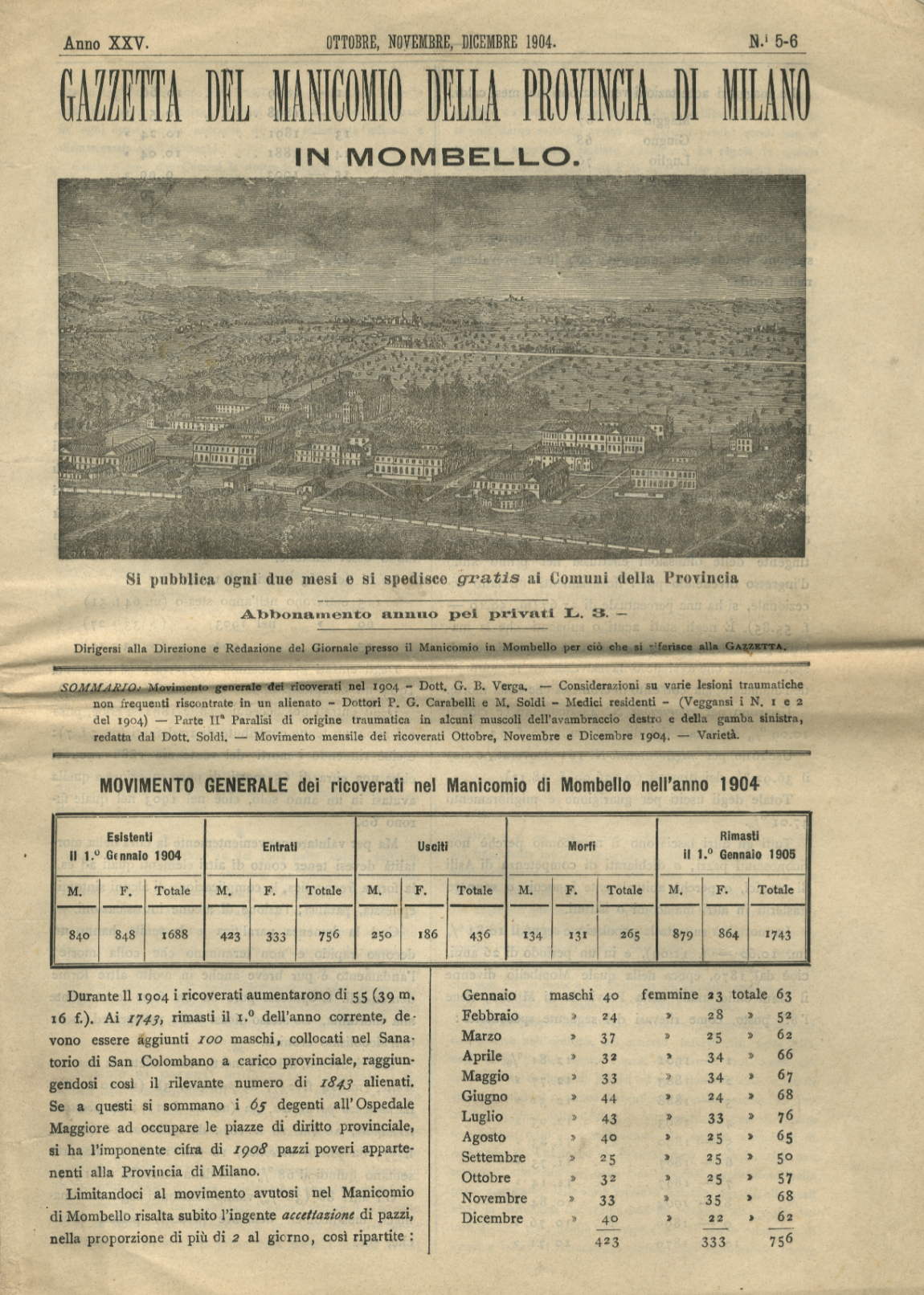
Gazzetta del Manicomio della Provincia di Milano in Mombello, edition of October - December 1904

The journal was created in 1880 and was published until 1905 every two months and was shipped free to all the communes of the Province of Milan. For private people, it was possible to subscribe to the journal and receive it at their home address. The newspaper highlighted the movement of admitted people inside the asylum during the period of a year: from January to December, there were registered the incoming, the outcoming and the deaths of the patients. In 1887 the Gazzetta reported on Mombello's presence at the International Exhibition of Equipment (for grinding, baking, and other associated industries) which was held in Milan in that year. The hospital's attendance at the event underlined and emphasized the connection between psychiatry and hygiene, along with psychiatrists' engagement with the education of the population about socially important health issues, such as Pellagra.

In the hygiene room at the Exposition, several pictures drawn by a patient of the hospital regarding the different phases of the skin disease pellagrous Erythema, were shown. About 400 free copies of the book Dialoghi written by the writers Edoardo Gonzales and Giovanni Battista Verga (Andrea's nephew) were given to visitors, in order to promote new ways of preventing the Pellagra disease. Gonzales also presented a packed bread with wheat and potato flour. The "Gazzetta" was also used to report the internal situation, mental issues and deaths that occurred over a specific time, other than general problems faced by the doctors, the directors, and the psychiatrists of the hospital itself.

== Structure ==
The structure is located in the complex of Villa Pusterla-Crivelli, the eighteenth-century villa built in 1754 by the architect Francesco Croce, who adopted a Medieval architectural style. The hospital, after the expansion in 1878, had different divisions for the patients and a library for doctors and patients which also had cultivable gardens and tailors. The asylum was built according to the ideas of Philippe Pinel and his son Scipion Plein in which he supposed that psychiatric hospitals should be located in small villages in order to achieve better results with the patients. In 1864, the Hospital was surrounded by a wall 3 meters high on all its perimeters of 1997 meters. The complex included also a garden, dedicated to the agricultural activities of the patients. Because of the overcrowding, the hospital was modified again in 1890, with the addition of two more floors to the two existing towers that conferred to the building the semblance of a real castle; some years later a new lighting system was created and installed. In 1911, professor Giuseppe Antonini became the director of the hospital and with him 3 new pavilions, the current Rossi, Ronzoni and Forlanini departments, were added.

At the beginning of its establishment, the project of the Mombello Psychiatric Hospital did not include the construction of a church and was kept the already existing one. In 1935, the S. Ambrogio Church was built in First Romanesque style, to create a larger church that could meet the growing population's needs. Antonini was also involved in the restructuring of all the departments, as well as the restrooms and other essential changes, and he developed the so-called “psychiatric dispensation”, that were structures that helped to accelerate the discharge of the patients in order to avoid overcrowding. The director that followed, Dr. Luigi Lugiato, concluded the works started by Antonini. A new set of buildings were then created: they included craftwork laboratories and facilities like bars and restaurants that opened the communication between the “hospital world” and the “outside world”.

== Treatments ==
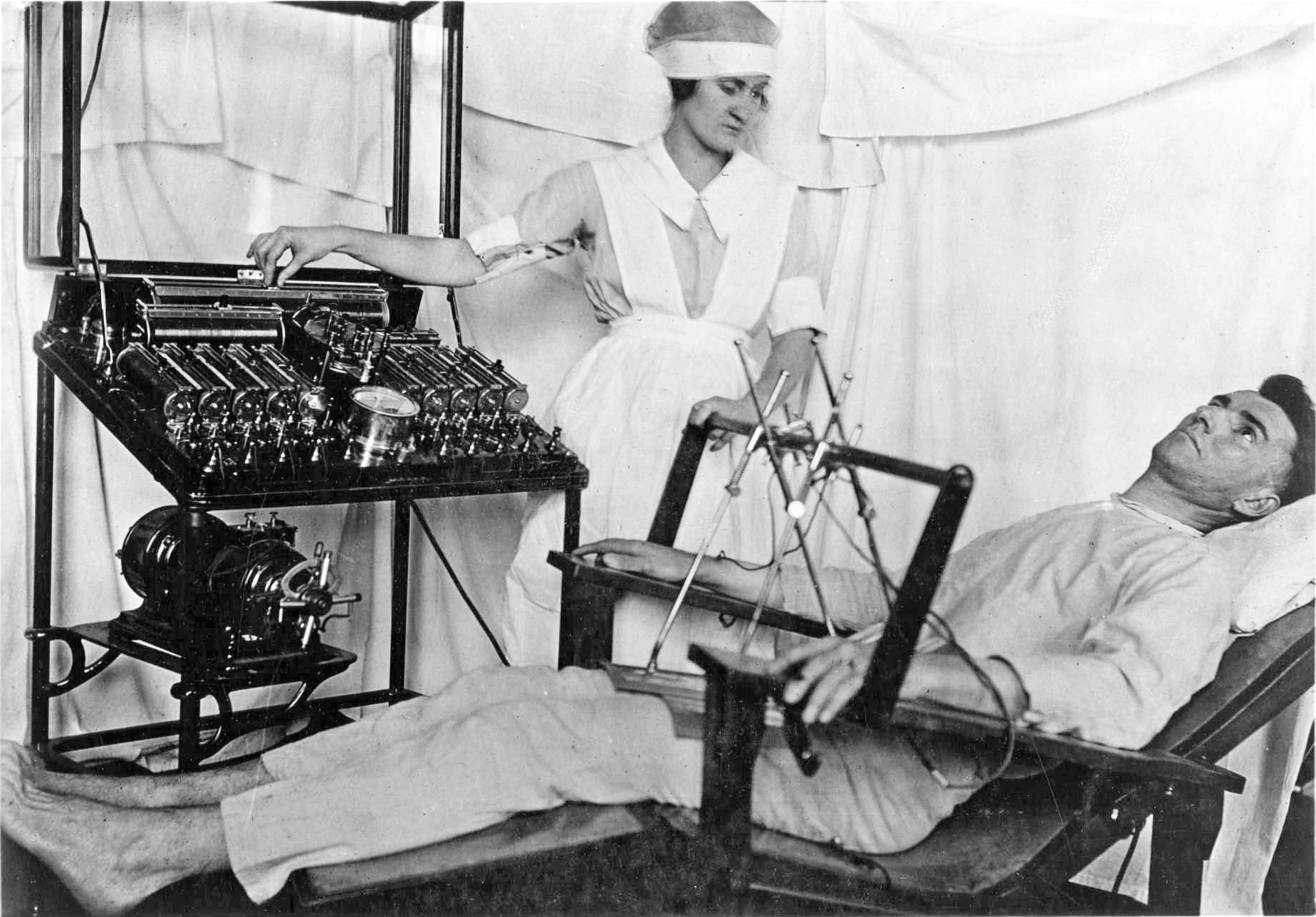
A Bergonic chair, a device "for giving general electric treatment for psychological effect, in psycho-neurotic cases", according to the original photo description. World War I era.

The patients were divided by behavior and attitude in four different groups: "The Quiet Ones", "The Agitated Ones", "The Filthy Ones" and "The Workers". The patients of the second category were kept in isolation, while the other patients were usually used in alleged "therapeutic" work. Many relevant doctors worked in the facility, such as Ugo Cerletti, the inventor of the electroconvulsive therapy and director of the neurobiological laboratory department of the hospital in 1922, and Gaetano Perusini, colleague and pupil of the eminent psychiatrist Alois Alzheimer who worked as an assistant for two years in the hospital before participating to the World War I. Within the walls of the Hospital, there were also administrative issues in particular if the patients had aggressive, unpredictable and violent behavior.

Few years later, music, exercise and art, in particular the figurative decoration of some areas of the hospital, started to be used in order to calm and cure the patients.

=== Controversies ===
Regarding the treatments used at the Mombello Psychiatric Hospital, the Citizens Commission on Human Rights investigated the asylum in 1979, because of suspicious therapies. Chemical residuals, that helped to preserve the actual structure of the tissues, were found in twelve bodies, 50 brains, limbs and heads recovered in the hospital. Most of the treatments used had been declared against the rights of the citizens.

== Notable personalities ==
=== Patients ===
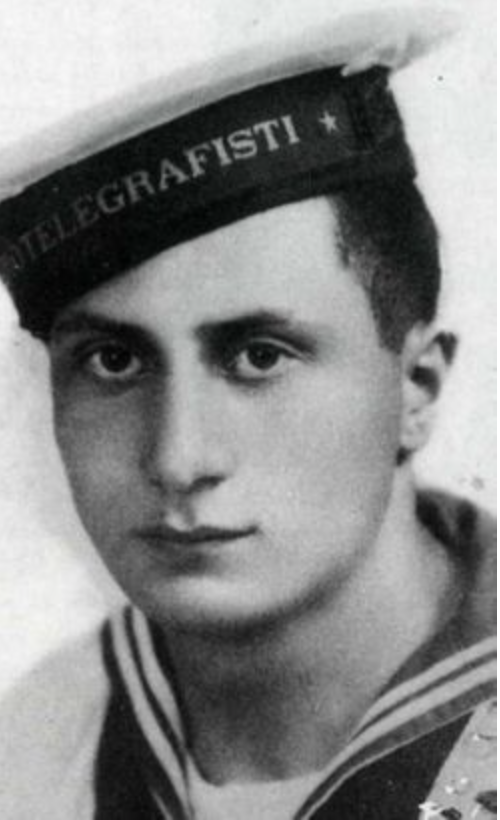
Benito Albino Dalser

- Benito Albino Dalser, also known as Benito Albino Mussolini, son of the Duce. He was interned in Mombello as a consequence of his failure to renounce his parentage to Mussolini. Documents later revealed that he was induced in to a coma with multiple doses of insulin

=== Directors ===
- Giuseppe Antonini
- Angelo Della Beffa
- Carlo Besta
- Riccardo Bozzi
- Gastone Canziani
- Ugo Cerletti
- Giuseppe Corberi
- Amarro Fiamberti
- Edoardo Gonzales
- Luigi Lugiato
- Elda Mazzocchi Scarzella
- Carlo Pini
- Giovanni Carlo Zapparoli

=== Psychiatrists ===
- Silvio Brambilla
- Cesare Castiglioni
- Ugo Cerletti
- Alberto Maleddu
- Mauro Morra
- Gaetano Perusini

== In the 21st century ==
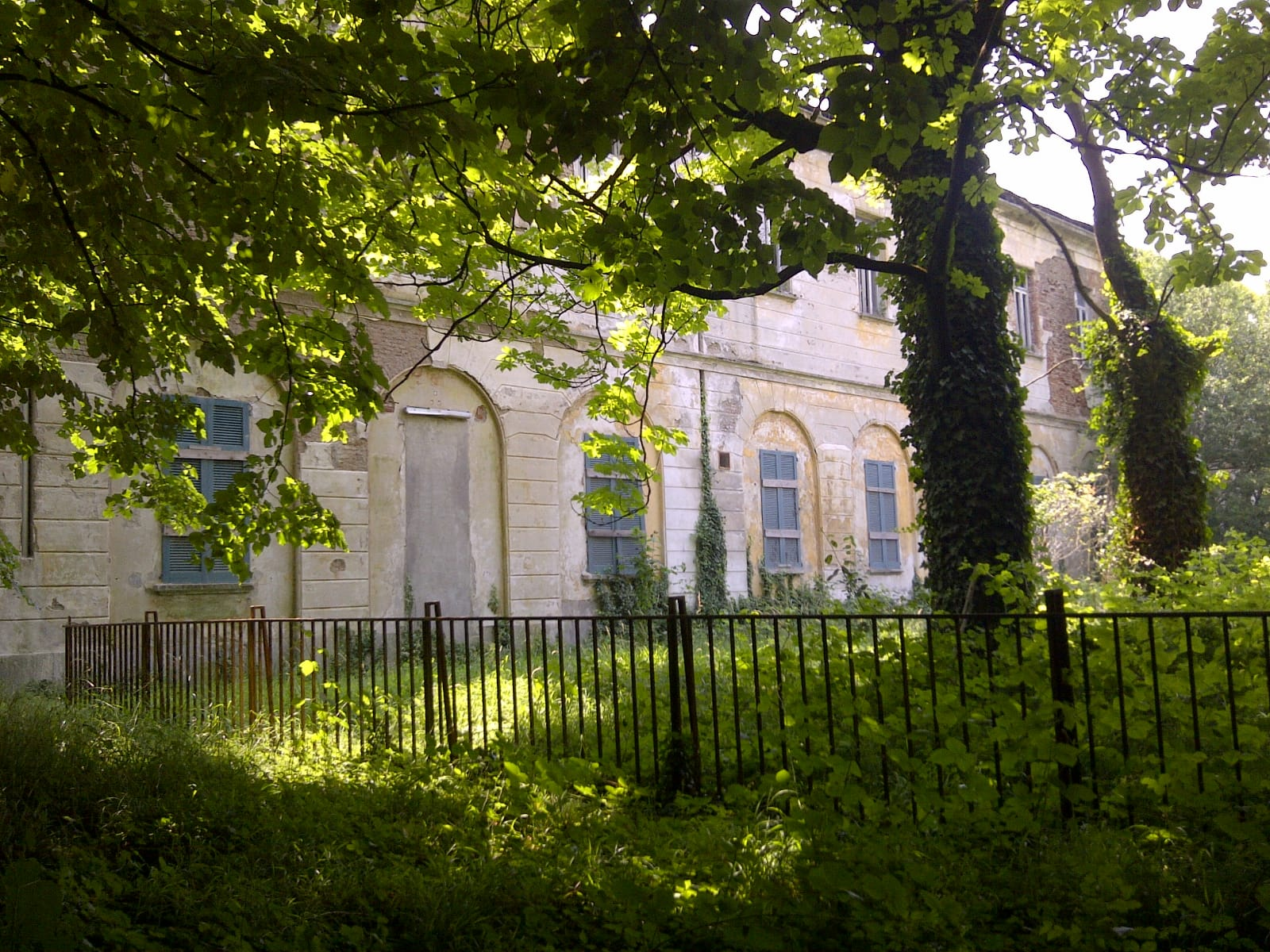
Mombello Psychiatric Asylum, April 10, 2019

The hospital was dissolved in two decades, between 1978 and 1999, due to a large number of patients. In the present, the facility is part of the Comune di Limbiate and the original property belongs to three different owners: Provincia di Monza e Brianza, the ASL of Monza e Brianza and the "G. Salvini" Hospital in Garbagnate. The first ones started separated initiatives of a re-functionalization process. The area belonging to the "G. Salvini" Hospital, 192.470 square meters, characterized by 22 buildings, is in a serious state of disrepair. In 2018 a project of restructuring the hospital was proposed by the students of the Polytechnic University of Milan. The aim of the project was the re-appropriation of the abandoned architectural heritage, using an innovative design, in order to make the structure valuable in terms of Historical and Social aspects. This included creating a museum in the "Gonzales" area of the asylum.

The Mombello Psychiatric Hospital is now an abandoned building, characterized by a deep devaluation of its most recognizable rooms. The ruins, nature and the numerous artworks made by anonymous street artists influenced the general idea that people used to have about the hospital. Only a few buildings had been saved by deterioration: Villa Crivelli, which became the new location for the agricultural institute Luigi Castiglioni, as well as other buildings that host the commercial institute for business experts and the Corberi structure, a halfway house for people with severe mental illnesses. In 2017, with the aim of celebrating heritage, the Comune of Limbiate was able to save three buildings to create a training school for nurses and doctors, a new senior center and an area for clubs and associations.

In 2014, Nicola Vicini, a photographer, wrote about the hospital,

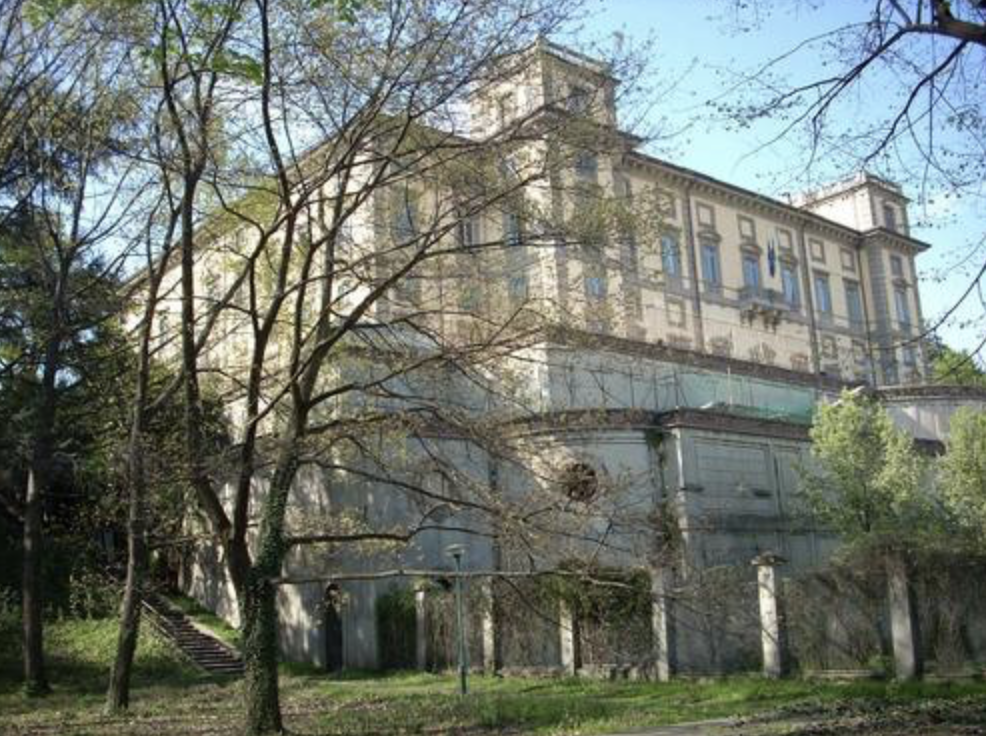
Facade of the Hospital in Mombello-Limbiate April 10, 2019

In the former hospital there are also materials that still tell the story of the hospital patients' stay. The presence of people who still live there is felt, even if, perhaps, occasionally. ... Surely, if you don't think of a place as just a photographic set, you can perceive the despair, the melancholy, the loneliness that could have been in the minds of the hospitalized (or locked up) people, who can't say if they were all really "crazy". During my journey inside the area, I was reminded of a song by Roberto Vecchioni "I pazzi sono fuori" and this phrase was part of the luggage I took around that day with the camera and the optics. Crazy people are out, don't look for them here" I think that today is even truer than before, also thinking about "the frenzy of modern life".

— Nicola Vicini, Nicola Vicini, Photographer

=== Recent studies ===
In the early 1900s, Giuseppe Paravicini did an autopsy on the bodies of the patients of the hospital to study their conditions post mortem. In more recent times, forensic scientists undertook toxicological analysis of these bodies that were made using head hairs. It was discovered that there was a high concentration of cocaine, used for medical purposes at the time. Nicotine and caffeine were also found.

== Popular culture ==
- 7 DAYS, 7 GIRLS (2017): One of the biggest events that characterized the recent history of the Mombello Psychiatric Hospital, was the shooting of the film 7 days, 7 girls starring Johnny Depp. The hospital appeared in the last 4 seconds of the final scene of the movie of Luciano Silighini Garagnani at Berlin International Film Festival in 2017.
- MOMBELLO. VOCI DA DENTRO IL MANICOMIO - VOICES FROM THE INSIDE OF THE ASYLUM (2013): This is a theatre project based on the Mombello Psychiatric Hospital and its history, with witnesses of people involved in different ways. The show was inspired by the artworks of Gino Sandri, Italian illustrator and painter.

== See also ==
- Battle of Caporetto
- Legge Basaglia
- Sigmund Freud
- Interpretation of Dreams
- Maria Montessori
- Ville Sbertoli

== Bibliography ==
- G. Antonini, L'ospedale psichiatrico provinciale di Milano in Mombello, Milano, Tip. Stucchi-Ceretti, 1925.
- C. Castiglioni, Sul manicomio di Mombello succursale al manicomio La Senavra, Milano, Radaelli dei filli Rechiedei, 1868.
- D. Cichetti, Where did you go?, Blurb, Nov 27, 2011.
- A. Gallenzi, Il figlio perduto (The lost son), Rizzoli, 17 Aprile 2018.
- Gazzetta del manicomio della provincia di Milano in Mombello, Milano, 1880-1905.
- The Journal of Mental Science, Vol. XLVIII. J. & A. Churchill. 1902. p. 138.
- Bellak, Leopold (1961). Contemporary European Psychiatry.
- Excerpta Medica: Neurology and psychiatry. Section 8, Volume 3. 1950.
- Archives of Neurology and Psychiatry, Volume 4. 1920.
- A.M.A. Archives of Neurology and Psychiatry. 1920.
- Public Health Service Publication, Issue 1979. 1969.
- Howells, John G. (1975). World history of psychiatry. ISBN 9780702005671.
