= Arnold Pick =

Czech-German psychiatrist (1851–1924)

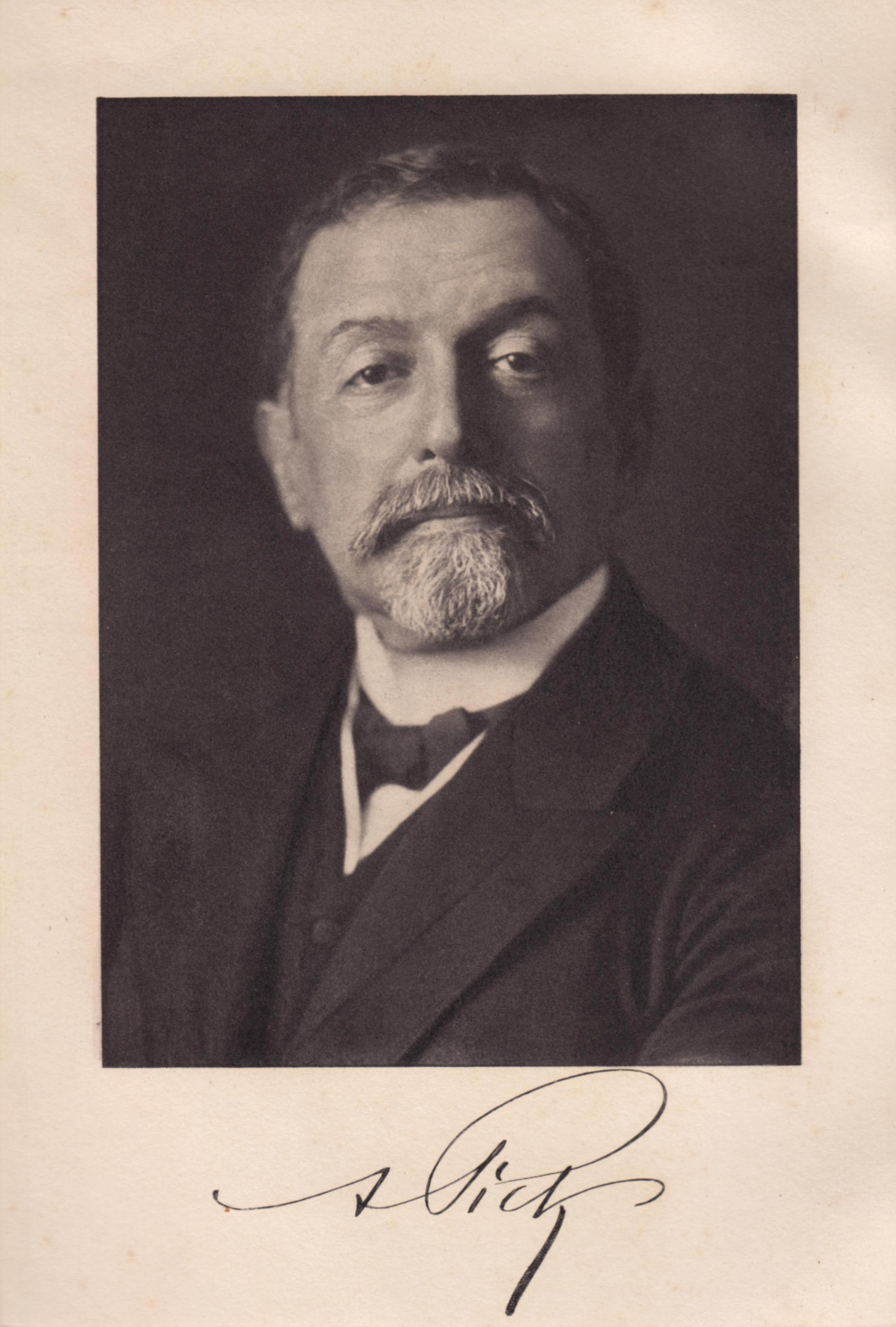
- Born: 20 July 1851; Velké Meziříčí, Moravia, Austrian Empire
- Died: 4 April 1924 (aged 72); Prague, Czechoslovakia
- Medical career
- Profession: Doctor
- Field: Psychiatry, neuropathology
- Institutions: German University

Arnold Pick (20 July 1851 – 4 April 1924) was a Czech-German psychiatrist. He is known for first describing clinical features of frontotemporal dementia between 1892 and 1906. The disorder he described was given the name Pick's disease in 1922. This term is now reserved for the behavioral variant of frontal temporal dementia that shows the presence of the characteristic Pick bodies and Pick cells, which were first described by Alois Alzheimer in 1911.

He was the first to name reduplicative paramnesia. He was the second to use the term dementia praecox (in 1891). Pick trained in Berlin with Karl Friedrich Otto Westphal and later worked at the infamous asylum of Wehnen. Pick headed the Prague neuropathological school and one of the school's members was Oskar Fischer. This school was one of the two neuropathological schools (the other one was in Munich where Alois Alzheimer worked) in Europe at the time that framed Alzheimer disease through empirical discoveries.

== Publications ==
- Beiträge zur Pathologie und pathologischen Anatomie des Centralnervensystems, mit Bemerkungen zur normalen Anatomie desselben. Karger, Berlin 1898.
- Studien zur Gehirnpathologie und Psychologie. Berlin 1908.
- Über das Sprachverständnis. Barth, Leipzig 1909.
- Die agrammatischen Sprachstörungen; Studien zur psychologischen Grundlegung der Aphasielehre. Springer, Berlin 1913.
- Ueber primäre chronische Demenz (so. Dementia praecox) im jugendlichen Alter. In: Prager medicinische Wochenschrift. 16, 1891, pp. 312–315.
- etwa 350 kleinere Abhandlungen. Verzeichnis in Archiv für Psychiatrie und Nervenkrankheiten 72 (1925) 1 ff.
