= Gaetano Perusini =

Italian physician

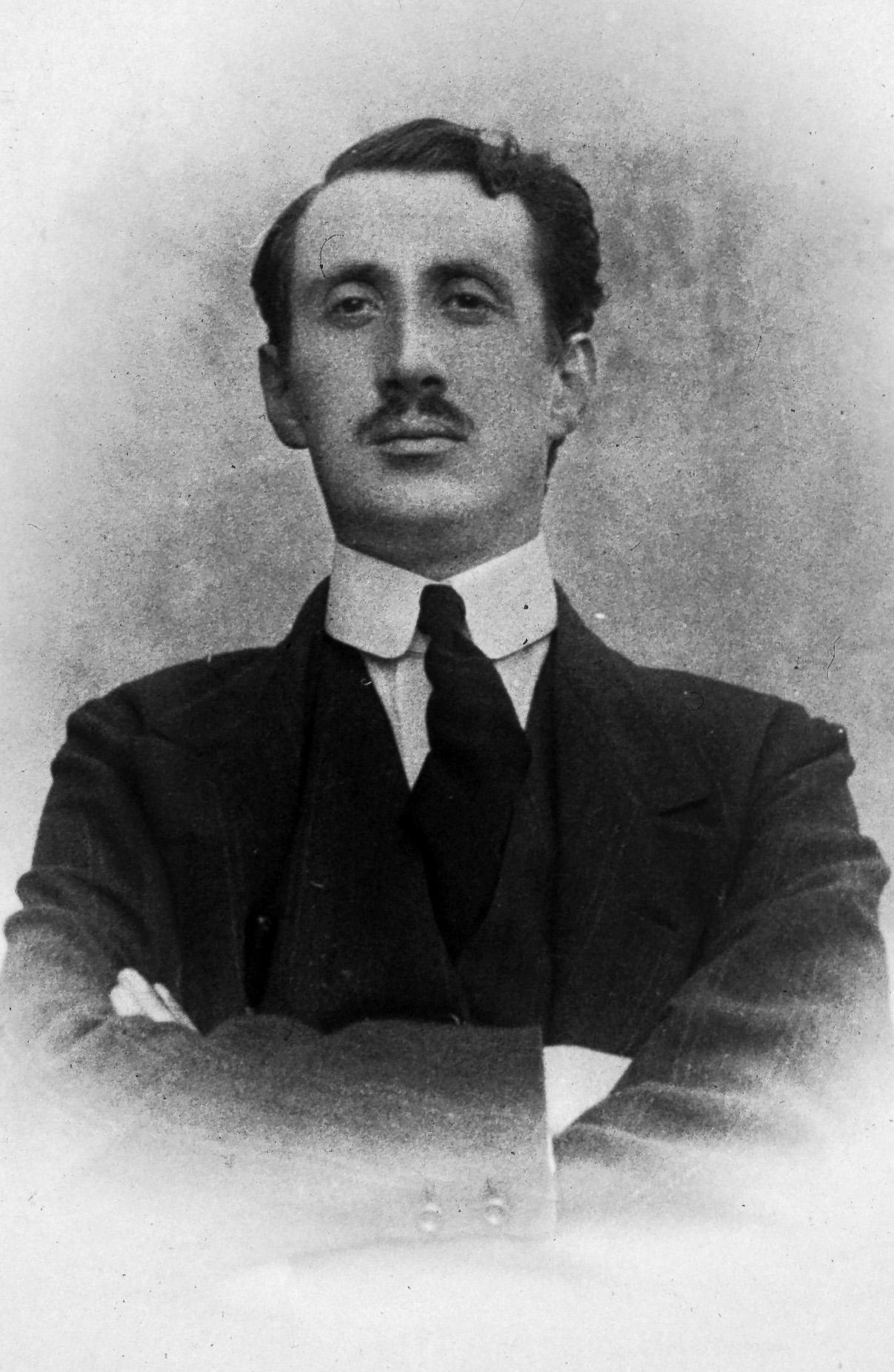
- Born: 24 February 1879; Udine
- Died: 8 December 1915 (aged 36); Monti Sabatini
- Known for: Alzheimer's disease
- Scientific career
- Fields: Medicine
- Academic advisors: Alois Alzheimer

Gaetano Perusini (24 February 1879 – 8 December 1915) was an Italian physician. He was the pupil and colleague of Alois Alzheimer and contributed to the definition of Alzheimer's disease.

== Education and early family life ==
Gaetano Perusini was born in Udine on February 24, 1879, to a successful family of physicians. Perusini's father, Andrea, was the Chief Physician of the Civil Hospital of Udine and his mother, Paolina Cumano, was the daughter of two prominent surgeons from Trieste. Perusini lost his father when he was only seven years old. This lack of a paternal force in the family enabled his growth and upbringing to be influenced mainly by his mother, a strong maternal personality, who guided his studies and encouraged his interest in medicine.

Perusini began studying medicine at the University of Pisa and then went on to finish his training at the University of Rome. In Rome, he often visited the local psychiatric clinic, the Lungara Mental hospital.

After graduating, Perusini decided to specialize in psychiatry, spending time at the psychiatric clinic of Augusto Giannelli and the neuropathology laboratory of Giovanni Mingazzini. Thanks to his time at professor Giovanni Mingazzini's laboratory, Perusini gained a deep passion for mental illnesses and an interest in pathological anatomy, which led to his enthusiasm to discover the organic basis of mental illnesses. Perusini graduated with a degree in Medicine at the age of 22, defending a thesis on Criminal Anthropology written under the guidance of prof. Giannelli.

== The Auguste Deter case ==
In November 1906, during a meeting of the psychiatry society in Tübingen, Alzheimer presented a case of premature dementia: Auguste Deter, a 51-year-old woman, who died only four years after she was diagnosed. The anatomical findings highlighted cortical atrophy, and diagnostic methods revealed accumulations of neurofibrils within neurons and "miliary foci" (rounded foci) deposit of "an abnormal substance" outside of them.

The presentation of the case was received coldly and no questions were asked for clarification from the speaker, much less from the moderator of the debate, the psychiatrist Alfred Hoche, of Freudian origin and therefore an opponent of Kraepelin, who made Alzheimer's report seem clinically and scientifically irrelevant. Only the following year, after having changed the title, will Alzheimer be able to publish it in a brief report, without iconographic material.

Alzheimer was convinced that he was facing a rare brain pathology and therefore decided to entrust the case to Perusini for a more in-depth and detailed evaluation of both the clinical aspects and the histopathological findings. Perusini re-examined the case of Auguste Deter and collected three other cases (47, 63 and 67 years old) of severe and rapid dementia in a 59 pages treatment accompanied by 79 drawings depicting the neuronal alterations, made by Perusini and collected in four tables.

Perusini believed that the neuro-pathological findings of the early onset cases did not differ from the senile ones, in fact in his discussion, he deliberately included the two senile cases (63 and 67 years old). By doing this, Perusini would have predicted the modern conception of this disease according to which presenile and senile dementia are not two isolated entities and, at the same time, disproved the position of Kraepelin that rejected this possibility.

== Perusini’s contribution to the definition of Alzheimer's disease ==
In his mesmerising work “On the nosographic value of some typically senile histological findings” Perusini defines the history of neuropathology of senile dementia. According to his findings, the first ever mention of senile plaques was by Blocq and Marinesco, in 1892, regarding an elderly patient suffering of epilepsy. Unfortunately, the description for miliary scleroses was attributed to Redlich in 1898 and Perusini's work was overlooked at the time. Perusini's dissertation on senile plagues convey the following topics: nomenclature, history, staining techniques results of microhistochemical research, differential diagnosis, origin and nature of senile plaques and their meaning in various human conditions.

The second part of his work contained an examination of the neurofibrillary alterations described by Alzheimer in 1908, Perusini reported that: "The altered neurofibrils in Bielschowsky solution have the most unusual aspects: wound in complex tangles which scarcely maintain the structure of nervous cells, they appear, within the tissue, almost as "skeletons'' of nervous cells …" In addition to the previously mentioned skeletons, other elements ought to be mentioned in which neurofibrils appear to be much thinner but arranged in complex convergent and divergent whirls' ' [1, p. 194]. Unfortunately, due to technical limitations on staining, Perusini was unable to draw precise conclusions regarding the correlation between senile plagues and neurofribillar alterations, and on the structure of neuroglia. Nonetheless, it is important to emphasize the up-to-dateness and the accuracy of Perusini's statements and work on staining. However, he was able to affirm that "the presence of neurofibrillar alterations can only be considered as one of the histopathological findings within senile cerebral involution" [10, p. 196], additionally he encouraged the facilitation of further studies to take place regarding this topic.

In 1909, Perusini's work "Histologische und Histopathologische Arbeiten" (printed in 1910) was published, in which he examined four cases and provided a detailed description on both histology and clinical cases. In one of the cases, with the collaboration of Sioli and Alzheimer, there was an identification of the presence of neurofibrillary alterations and military foci in the cerebral cortex, he concluded that "we are surely in the presence of a peculiar and relatively unknown disease … which cannot be included into any group of known diseases.” Perusini's work in 1911 provided abundant information regarding histological iconography, he described that it is "centered upon the diagnostic value of anatomopathological findings within plaques and neurofibrillar alterations as described by Alzheimer.”

Perusini's work attributed the identification of the atypical forms of senile dementia to Alzheimer's disease, by providing detailed descriptions. It is worth mentioning his very modern conclusions: “senile plaques are among the characteristic findings within cerebral involution. In this sense they can be said to be characteristic of senile dementia: they are present in every senile patient's brain; moreover, their number, diffusion and dimensions indicate somehow the seriousness of the involutive process.”

== The Return to Italy and World War I ==
Perusini eventually returned to Italy in 1911, and although his work was known all over Europe he was unable to find a suitable and stable academic position. It was not until 1913 that he was able to find a professional post as an assistant in the Mombello Psychiatric Hospital in Milan. Perusini was raised in a patriotic family which likely influenced his decision to enlist, albeit hiding his professional identity, into the army as a volunteer at the outbreak of the First World War. Eventually, the military discovered his medical professional background and was assigned to the first aid post in San Floriano del Collio, where on November 28, 1915, he was hit by shrapnel while assisting the wounded.

== Death and legacy ==
Gaetano Perusini died on December 8, 1915, in the Red Cross hospital in Cormons, in one of the houses his family owned, and received the silver medal for valor. Although Peursini died at a young age of 36 and was thus unable to continue his research, his scientific contribution to the definition of the clinical and neuropathological aspects of neurodegenerative dementia, must be remembered. It is widely believed that his name has the right to be joined to that of Alzheimer's in the more correctly defined disease of Alzheimer-Perusini.

== Main works ==
- On the clinical and histological aspects of a particular mental illness of advanced age. Histological and Histopathological Works, Volume III. H.2 (Über klinische und histologische eigenartige psychische Erkrankung das späteren Lebensalters | Nissl-Alzheimer), published in 1909
- Pathological anatomy in psychiatry (L'anatomia patologica in psichiatria (suoi fini, suoi mezzi)) written in 1909, published by Rivista Sperimentale di Freniatria.
- On the nosographic value of some histopathological findings characteristic for senility (Sul valore nosografico di alcuni reperti istopatologici caratteristici per la senilità. Rivista di Neuropatologia, Psichiatria ed Elettroterapia 4), published by Journal of Neuropathology, Psychiatry and Electrotherapy 4 (IV) in two parts in 1911.

== Bibliography ==
- Boller, H., Nowotny, H., Die Kristallstruktur von Ti5As3, Monatshefte für Chemie, 1965, pp. 565–569
- Carelli, Laura, Pezzati, Rita, Poletti, Barbara, Zago, Stefano, La comunicazione della diagnosi di malattia di Alzheimer: aspetti clinici ed etico-giuridici, Ricerche di Psicologia (2), May 2013, pp. 501–523
- ERT and Alzheimer's disease, Inpharma Wkly, 8 April 1998
- Lucci, B., The contribution of Gaetano Perusini to the definition of Alzheimer's disease, The Italian Journal of Neurological Sciences, February 1998, pp. 49–52
- McMenemey, W. H., Alois Alzheimer and his disease, Ciba Foundation Symposium - Alzheimer's Disease and Related Conditions, Chichester, UK, John Wiley & Sons, 1970, pp. 5–9
- Nissl, F, Alzheimer, A, Histologische und Histopathologische Arbeiten über die Grosshirnrinde, The Journal of Nervous and Mental Disease, January 1922, pp. 75
- Rosso, Mattia, Chu, Duong, Gaetano Perusini (1879-1915), Journal of Neurology, 2021, pp. 4400–4401
- Smith, Theodore L., Rivista Italiana di Neuropatologia, Psichiatria ed Elettroterapia, The American Journal of Psychology, July 1908, pp. 425
