= Giovan Pietro Vieusseux =

Italian writer and publisher (1779–1863)

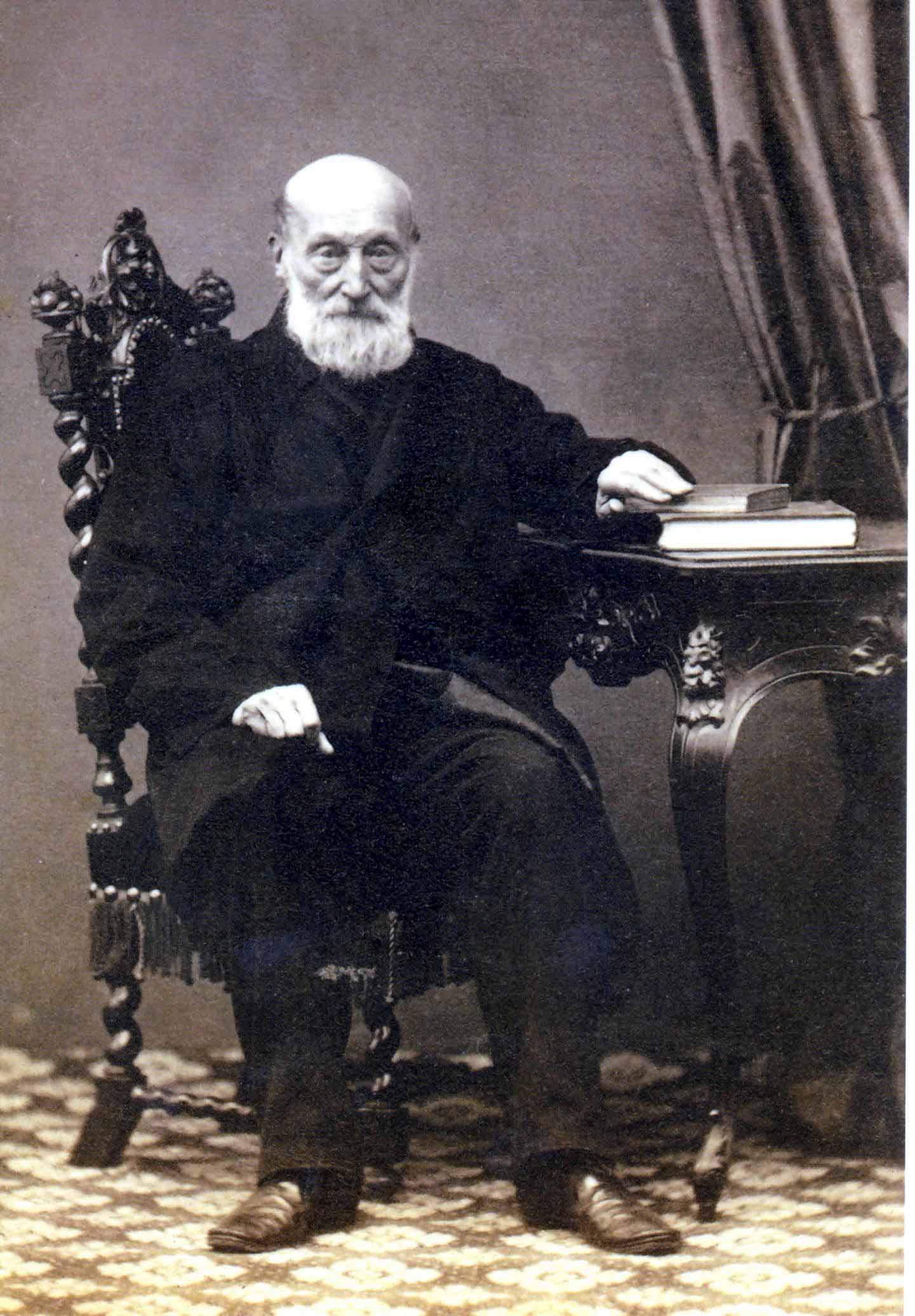
Vieusseux (date unknown)

Giovan Pietro Vieusseux (Italian pronunciation: [dʒoˌvam ˈpjɛːtro vjøsˈsø, - vjesˈse]; 28 September 1779 in Oneglia – 28 April 1863 in Florence) was an Italian writer and editor of French-Swiss ancestry.

== Biography ==
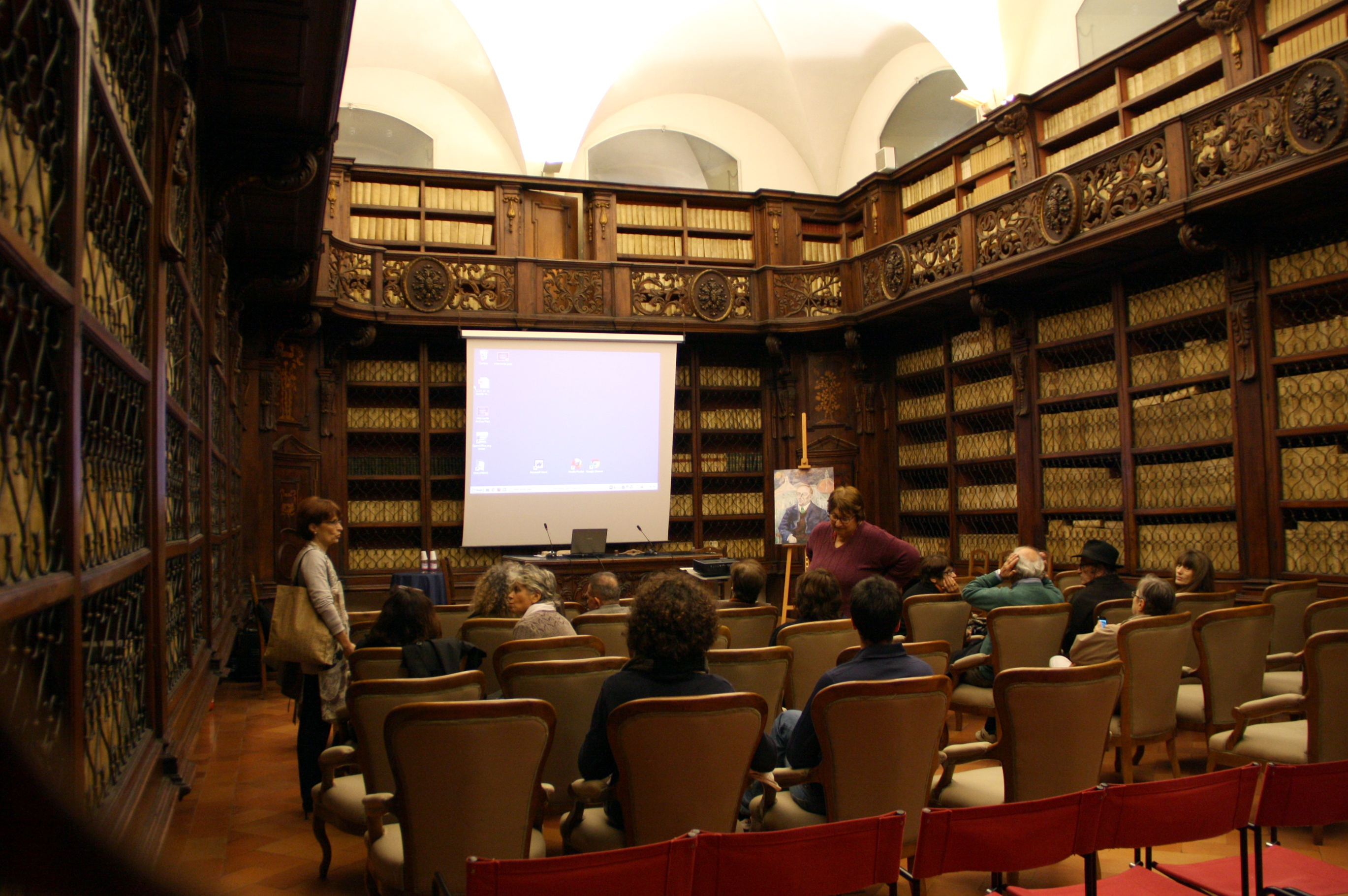
The Gabinetto Vieusseux

His father, Pierre Vieusseux (1746–1832), was a merchant and lawyer, originally from Geneva. He initially studied business and, in 1804, took charge of the Antwerp branch of Sauter, frères et Cie., watchmakers. After 1814, he worked for his brother-in-law, Pierre Senn (1767–1838), one of the owners of Senn, Guebhard et Cie., merchants, in Livorno. He travelled throughout Northern Europe on their behalf until 1817, when he went to Tunis. While there, the city was hit by a plague epidemic. He planned to write a book about it, based on his diary, but it was never completed.

In 1819, he moved to Florence and announced the opening of a literary and scientific meeting room (now known as the Gabinetto Vieusseux), at the Palazzo Buondelmonti. His personal collection formed the basis for its library, which was opened in 1820. Later, reference works, maps, and periodicals were added.

He also maintained a voluminous correspondence with the intellectuals of that time and, together with Gino Capponi, founded Antologia, a literary and political magazine. The first issue appeared in January 1821. Its contributors included Carlo Botta, Pietro Colletta, Ugo Foscolo, Pietro Giordani, Giacomo Leopardi, Giuseppe Mazzini and Niccolò Tommaseo. In the November–December 1832 issue, two articles met with the rigours of pre-emptive censorship, one of which contained criticism of Austria. The release was delayed to January 1833. The authorities asked the editor to reveal the names of the authors of the two pieces. When the editor refused to comply with the government's requests, the magazine was closed by Grand Duke Leopold II of Tuscany, under pressure from Austria.

In 1842, he became the editor of the Archivio storico italiano. The initial series of articles he published was about the work of Ludovico Antonio Muratori, the first scholar to make extensive use of Italian historical sources. From 1857 to 1863, he edited the Giornale storico degli archivi toscani (Historical Journal of the Tuscan Archives), published by the archives of the Grand Duchy, under the direction of Francesco Bonaini.

On the fortieth anniversary of the Gabinetto's opening, a gold medal was struck, honouring his contributions as an intermediary between Italian culture and European culture in general. He was a member of numerous academies throughout Italy. A street and a school in Imperia are named after him, as well as a square in Florence.

In 1887, his nephew Eugenio donated his correspondence to the National Central Library. Since then, most of the donated items have been placed in the Gabinetto.
