= Ville Sbertoli =

- Location with Pistoia

Geography
- Location: Colle Gigliato, Via Solitaria, 51100, Tuscany, Italy
- Coordinates: 43°57′13.702″N 10°55′5.599″E

Organisation
- Type: Specialist

Services
- Speciality: Psychiatric hospital

History
- Founded: 1868
- Closed: 1978

Links
- Lists: Hospitals in Italy
- Building details

General information
- Status: Abandoned
- Architectural style: Pavilion model

Ville Sbertoli (also known as Casa di salute Sbertoli) was a lunatic asylum in Pistoia, Italy. The original structure was built in the 17th century. In 1868, it was bought by Agostino Sbertoli, who wanted to create a health facility for wealthy families. After serving as a political prison during World War II, it was transformed into a public psychiatric hospital in 1951. The complex was later abandoned.

== Location ==
Ville Sbertoli is located in the park on Via Collegigliato in Pistoia, Italy. The entrance gate faces a small street called Via Solitaria. Villa Franchini Taviani, one of the original two structures, is located on a hill on the Colle Gigliato. It can be accessed from Via di Bigiano, an avenue of cypress trees. Villa Tanzi Lugaro, the second of the two original buildings, is located on the lower part of the hill, and can be seen from the city centre. Over twenty buildings were added later, in the surrounding area.

== History ==
=== Origin ===
The original two buildings were built between 1600 and 1700 and consisted of the two villas: Villa Franchini Taviani and Villa Giovacchini Rosati.

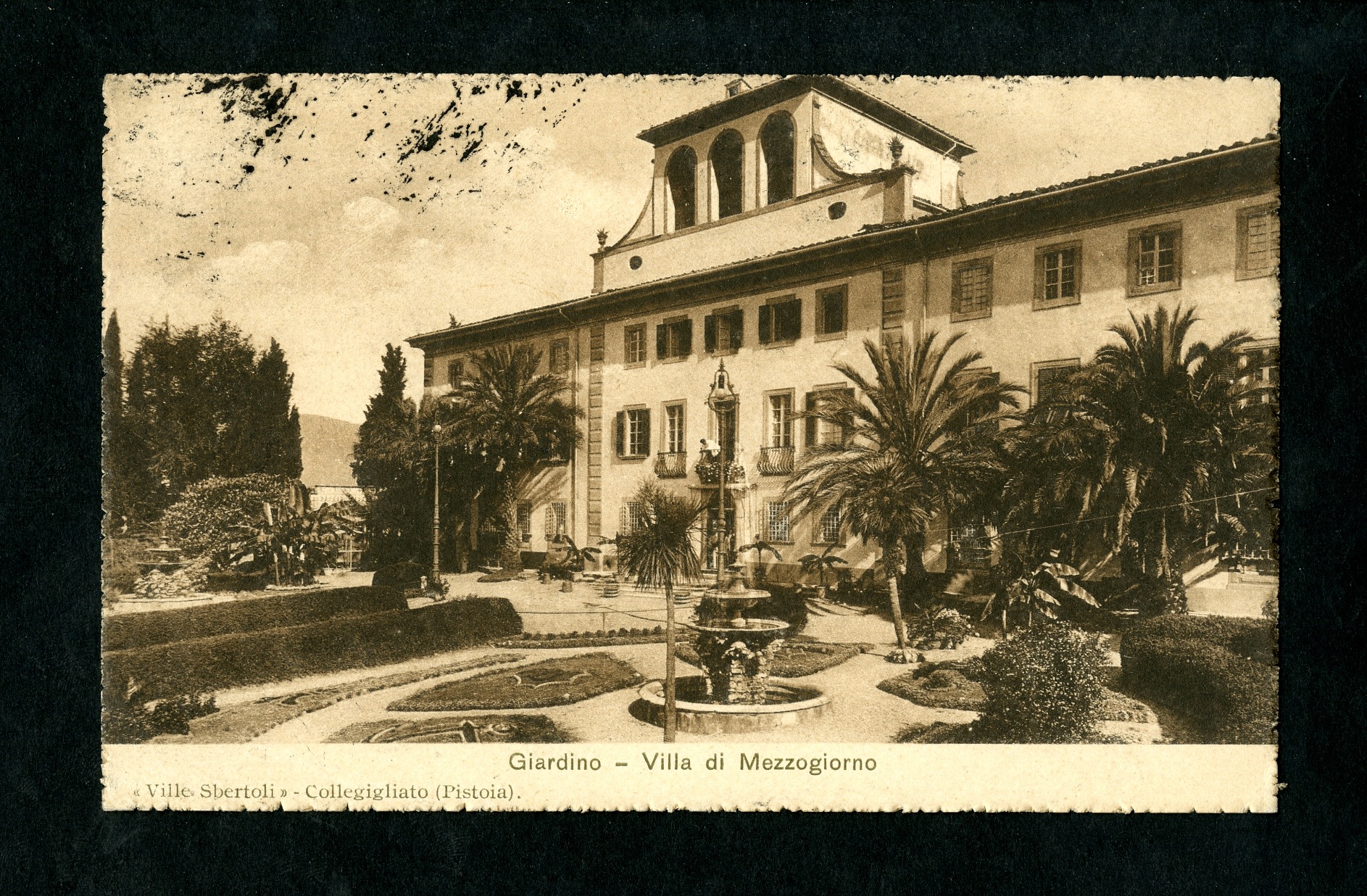
Villa di Mezzogiorno, 1925

They were originally purchased by Agostino Sbertoli, a doctor at the San Benedetto mental hospital in Pesaro, as his private residence. Between 1868 and 1876, Sbertoli turned them into a psychiatric hospital. The first patient was admitted on March 18, 1868: a 29 year-old Florentine man suffering from epilepsy. After his admission, the hospital began to gain recognition. In a few years, patients from across Europe were treated at the hospital, prompting Sbertoli to start an expansion project (1880-1900) to accommodate more patients. The hospital grounds eventually covered 51,000 ha (130,000 acres) and held over 20 structures, with 9 serving as villas to house patients.

Patients were assigned to buildings based on their gender, social status, and the type of illness. Several famous psychiatrists worked at the hospital, including Cesare Lombroso (a professor of forensic medicine at Torino University, and the founder of criminal anthropology) and Eugenio Tanzi, the director of S. Salvi mental hospital in Florence. Famous patients included jurist Francesco Bonaini and Severino Ferrari, the Italian poet and literature critic (a close friend of Italian poet Pascoli). After Agostino Sbertoli's death in 1898, his son Nino, also a psychiatrist, inherited his father's work, continuing the expansion process. Nino Sbertoli assigned doctor Giulio Casanova as a director. He combined Ville Sbertoli and Ville Casanova (built-in 1895) to create the "Grande Sanatorium Toscano", which operated until 1919. In 1920, the building was sold to a private group from Pistoia.

Various mental illnesses were treated in Ville Sbertoli, including depression, epilepsy, alcoholism, hypochondriac disorders, chronic delirium, manic exaltation and madness. A range of treatments were applied depending on the malady, including the use of electricity to heal slight paralysis, hydrotherapy, the use of ice on the head, leeches and vesicants on the head and anus.

=== World War II ===
During the fascist period in 1943–1944, the city of Pistoia was subject to three heavy aerial attacks. Due to the bombing damage, the Repubblica Sociale Italiana authorities moved prisoners from the jail of Pistoia to Ville Sbertoli, turning the hospital into a detention center for political prisoners. In 1944, Silvano Fedi and other partisans fighting the fascist regime attacked the buildings and released 54 males, 3 females (2 Jewish). After the war, Ville Sbertoli was restored to serve its original purpose.

=== Closure ===
In 1950, the structure (then owned by a private group from Pistoia) was sold to the province of Pistoia, turning the building into a provincial neuropsychiatric hospital. The prime minister of Italy, Alcide de Gasperi, inspected Ville Sbertoli, determining it to be unsuitable. This was due to the low level of patient treatment, lack of equipment, poor record management, overcrowding and decaying premises. In 1978, neuropsychiatrist Franco Basaglia created a national reformation system known as Legge Basaglia. The system aimed at ending the poor treatment of patients and increasing focus on the study of illnesses. This resulted in the closure of Ville Sbertoli on May 13, 1978, along with all other mental hospitals in Italy. From 1978, Ville Sbertoli started taking care of non-mental health treatments until the structure was gradually closed, at which point the buildings were abandoned.

=== Twenty-first century ===
In 2019, the region of Tuscany agreed to a program of structural reconstruction, which remained unimplemented in 2020.

The villas are closed to the public. The original patients' rooms retain interesting drawings on the walls, including illustrations of guns, people and trees. The drawings are believed to have been created by patients. The outside of the buildings retain some of the machines used to treat patients using Electroconvulsive Therapy. Other relics include documents, water bottles, medical records, and books.

People have trespassed in the buildings. The only people who are authorized access to the building are the neighbours, who are in charge of cleaning the water purifier. Although it remains closed to the public, it is possible to get a specific permit from the ASL (Italian Health Association).

== Architecture ==
=== Original structures (1868–1890) ===
The original villas:

- Villa Franchini is 39 feet high with three floors and surface area of 21,5m x 17,5m. It has a typical style of an18th century villa, with a façade of three rows of windows with a balcony, decorated and formed with an iron railing with the Sbertoli family crest on top. The building was surrounded by an enclosed garden with a group of columns, with flower boxes on top, and an iron gate constructed by the architect Girolamo de Rossi. Until 1894, this represented the only way to access the structure. The entrance is decorated with a monument dedicated to Galileo Galilei.
- Villa Rosati is 42 feet high, also three floors, with a surface area of 45m x 10,5m. The roof includes three balconies, creating extra height. Like Villa Franchini, the construction of Villa Rosati dates to the 18th century. Today, the interiors are well maintained in comparison to Villa Franchini, with salons on the ground and first floors, both decorated with an iron railing and paintings on the walls.

=== First expansion and site reorganization (1880–1896) ===
Increasing demand from new patients resulted in 20 years of expanding construction work, which started in 1880. This expansion enabled Agostino Sbertoli to reallocate patients to different buildings, based on criteria such as the type of the mental illness, gender, and the patient's financial resources.

The asylum was reconstructed with the union of Villa Franchini and Villa Rosati. Architects Carlo Livi and Francesco Azzurri based the redesign on "littered pavilions", a specific model aimed at the creation of an environment different from the typical idea of hospitals. This significantly contributed towards recovery of patients, creating a peaceful feeling of family and community. It consisted of a village format, with independent buildings surrounded by gardens.

Villa Rosati was redefined as Villa di Mezzogiorno due to its position. It consisted of 50 luxurious apartments, and was specifically dedicated to wealthy patients of both genders. Patients in this specific structure had the opportunity to join the Sunday masses, organised by the administration.

The second block became Villa di Levante, was built in 1880 and housed male patients. It consisted of 24 rooms, including three recreation rooms and a garden.

Villa Centrale was built in 1896, and was also known as Villa Franchini. It was divided into apartments for residential female patients and for key staff, including the director of the institute and the female inspector. The structures were connected by an internal phone system and a private aqueduct.

=== Expansion of Villa Franchini (1893–1896) ===
Construction continued in 1893, expanding Villa Centrale with new kitchens, dining room, and bathroom. A new entrance was built to give patients immediate access to the centre of the villas.

In 1896 an additional villa was constructed, called Villa Serena. This was divided into luxury apartments available to wealthy female patients. It included bathrooms, a stable and the house for the gardener.

=== Construction of the Villini (1896–1951) ===
The division of illnesses was addressed with the construction of new buildings known as the Villini.

The two structures of Villini were located next to Villa Centrale and Villa Levante. They consisted of: six rooms, a bathroom (shared by all patients), a gallery, and a loft with three rear windows. Patients could enter the building through the main entrance of Villa Levante. The structure consisted of a long corridor of patient rooms on the ground floor. Since this area was dedicated to patients with potentially violent conditions, the doors contained a central hole of 5 cm for staff observation, and the walls were cushioned for sound proofing and patient safety. On the top floor, the loft area was used by the nurses.

=== Passing of administration (1898–1951) ===
In 1898 Nino Sbertoli continued expansion, including a greenhouses, warehouses, food storage areas, carpentry, the raising of the Villini buildings, and a power station. A covered hallway was also built to connect the main structure to the other buildings, so that doctors and nurses could move more easily from one place to another.

In 1906 the structure was expanded with the acquisition of a new property known as "Villa Douglas" or "la Falconera", kept until 1920.

Nino Sbertoli gave the management of the buildings to a doctor Giulio Casanova, who joined the buildings of Ville Sbertoli with Ville di Casanova.

The new area was characterized by an eclectic style which consisted of two 17th-century villas, surrounded by a garden with fountains, lakes, tree-lined avenues, a building for pool and lawn tennis. This architecture was designed for patients from middle to high social classes. It comprised a total of 15 buildings with a large park with different species of trees such as cypresses, pines, oak trees such as holm oak and an agricultural estate in which olive trees and grapevine were cultivated.

== Legend ==
Throughout the years, many stories purported to explain the site's origins. One of them states that the Villa was bought by Sbertoli's family when one of Agostino's sons presented mental disorders. According to this theory, Sbertoli dedicated his life to finding a cure for his son. His attempts proved to be unsuccessful and the boy died. In honour of his death, the father decided to donate all his wealth (including the villas) to whoever could help cure people with the same type of mental disorder.

According to visitor stories, screaming, moaning and crying can be heard that are said to come from the ghosts of past patients. Another story claims that the old piano found in the central hall of the structure is still played by Sbertoli's son. After visiting the structure, it is said that visitors become dominated by a feeling of sadness - as if the old patients' spirits want them to feel the pain they felt while living there.

== Notable personalities ==
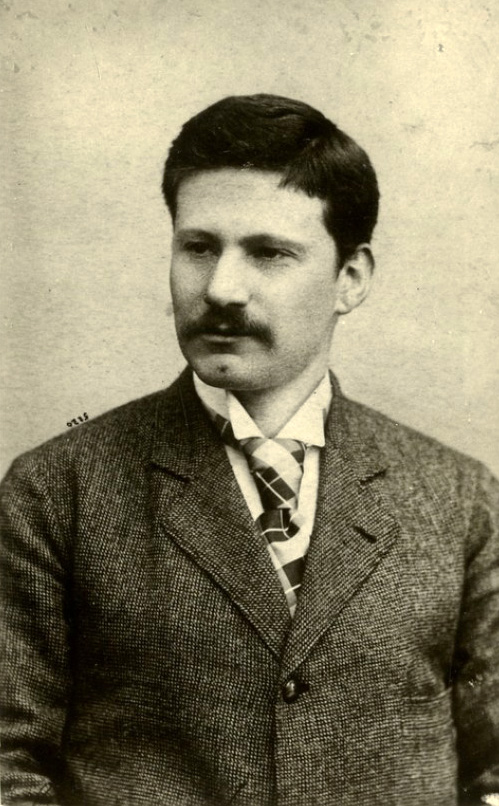
Severino Ferrari

=== Patients ===
- Severino Ferrari
- Francesco Bonaini

=== Partisans and patriots ===
- Alvaro Boccardi
- Valoris Poli
- Aldo Calugi
- Vinicio Giusfredi Lando
- Silvano Fedi

=== Psychiatrists ===
- Cesare Lombroso
- Eugenio Tanzi

== See also ==
- Legge Basaglia
- Mombello Psychiatric Hospital
- Italian Fascism
- II World War
- Volterra Psychiatric Hospital

== Bibliography ==
- A. Ottanelli, Le Ville Sbertoli. Da Casa di salute a Ospedale neuropsichiatrico provinciale, Pisa, Pacini Editore, 2013 (Italian)
- A. Stanghellini, Finestra sul lago, Firenze, Marzocco, 1954 (Italian)
- F. Mazzoni, Una storia da non dimenticare. Ricostruzione dell'eccidio della Fortezza di S. Barbara del 31 marzo 1944, Pistoia, Edizioni del Comune di Pistoia, 2015 (Italian)
- Nori Andreini Galli, Ville Pistoiesi, Lucca, Maria Pacini editore, 1989 (Italian)
