= Ugo Cerletti =

Italian neurologist

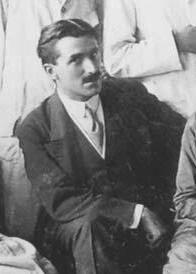
- Cerletti in 1909 or 1910
- Born: 26 September 1877; Conegliano, Kingdom of Italy
- Died: 25 July 1963 (aged 85); Rome, Italy
- Known for: Inventing electroconvulsive therapy
- Scientific career
- Fields: Neurology, neuropsychiatry, Psychiatry
- Workplaces: University of Genoa; University of Rome La Sapienza

Ugo Cerletti (26 September 1877 – 25 July 1963) was an Italian neurologist who discovered the method of electroconvulsive therapy (ECT) used in psychiatry. Electroconvulsive therapy is a therapy in which electric current is used to provoke a seizure for a short duration. This therapy is used in an attempt to treat certain mental disorders, and may be useful when other possible treatments have not, or cannot, cure the person of their mental disorder.

== Life ==
Ugo Cerletti was born in Conegliano, in the region of Veneto, Italy, on 26 September 1877. He studied Medicine at Rome and Turin, later specializing in neurology and neuropsychiatry. In his early scientific studies, Cerletti mainly focused on common issues in the fields of histology and histopathology. He demonstrated how the nervous tissue reacts to different pathogenic stimuli in its own ways, making the histopathology of nervous tissue an independent category in the study of medicine. As a student, he conducted some research under several influential people studying in the Medicinal field at that time. He studied with the most eminent neurologists of his time, first in Paris, France, with Pierre Marie and Dupré, then in Munich, Germany, with Emil Kraepelin (the "father" of modern scientific psychiatry) and Alois Alzheimer (the discoverer of the most common form of senile dementia, which today bears his name); and in Heidelberg, with Franz Nissl, a neuropathologist. Other large names in medicine that he studied with at the time include Sciamanna and Nissl.

After his studies, he was appointed head of the Neurobiological Institute, at the Mental Institute of Milan. He remained the director of the Neurobiological Institute of the psychiatric hospital of Mombello, in Milan from 1919 to 1924. In 1924 he was given a lecturing post in Neuropsychiatry in Bari; then, in 1928, he took over the post of Prof. Enrico Morselli, at the University of Genoa. Finally, in 1935, he became the Chair of the Department of Mental and Neurological Diseases at the University of Rome La Sapienza, where he developed electroconvulsive therapy (ECT) for the treatment of several kinds of mental disorders, a discovery which made him world-famous. Ugo Cerletti was appointed Professor Emeritus of Psychiatry and Neurology at the University of Rome La Sapienza. While in Rome he became a freemason, and he served on the Supreme Council of the Scottish Rite in Italy.

== Works and discovery ==
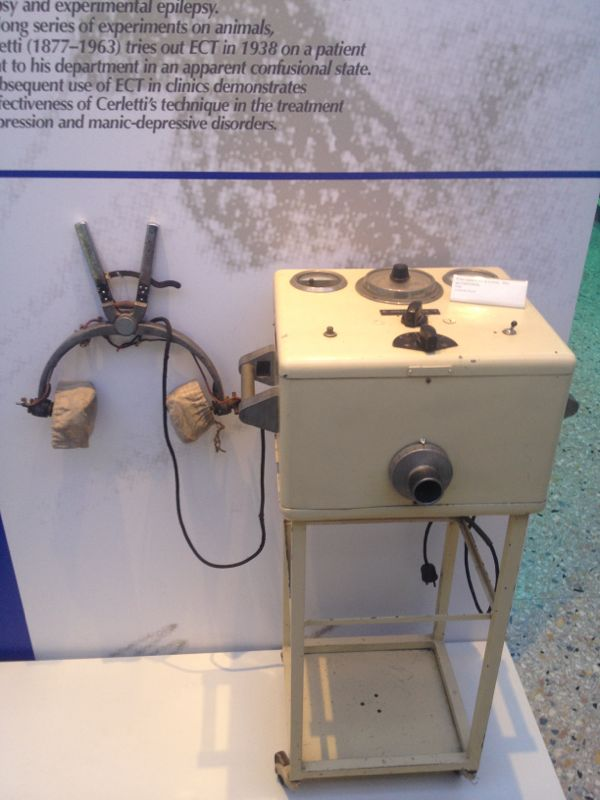
Cerletti's ECT machine preserved at Museo di Storia della Medicina in Rome

The idea to use ECT in humans first came to Cerletti from watching pigs being anesthetised with electroshock before being butchered. The story goes, that on his way home he stopped at a butcher shop. The shop didn't have the cut of meat that he wanted and he was told to walk back to the slaughter house behind the shop to have the cut made for him. At that slaughter house, the technique used for butchering cattle involved an electric shock to their heads. This would cause the cattle to go into seizures and fall down, making it easy to slit their throats. In that time period, people believed that seizures were essential in preventing schizophrenia, since many believed that those diagnosed with epilepsy were immune to the disorder. Cerletti reasoned that electric shock might be useful in humans as a treatment for schizophrenia.

Furthermore, since 1935, metrazol, a convulsant drug, and insulin, a hormone, were in wide use in many countries to treat schizophrenics, with great success. This approach was based on Nobel winner Julius Wagner-Jauregg's research on the use of malaria-induced convulsions to treat some nervous and mental disorders, such as the general paresis of the insane, caused by neural syphilis, as well as on Ladislas J. Meduna's theory that schizophrenia and epilepsy were antagonistic. The pharmacological convulsive treatment of Ladislas J. Meduna would eventually be largely replaced by the less cumbersome electrical method of Cerletti.

Cerletti came to the use of electroshock for therapeutic purposes in humans by way of many experiments with animals on the neuropathological consequences of repeated epileptic seizures. In Genoa, he used electric current to provoke repeatable, seizures in dogs and other animals. In these early experiments, many of the animals that were used ended up dying. In Rome, his assistant Lucio Bini realized a rudimental apparatus with a control panel that could safely be applied to humans.

Cerletti first used ECT in a human patient, a diagnosed schizophrenic with delusions, hallucinations and confusion, in April 1938, in collaboration with Lucio Bini. A series of electroshocks were able to return the patient to a normal state of mind. This experiment indicated that electric shock treatment may hold potential to improve the condition of patients diagnosed with specific diseases. Electric shock treatment quickly replaced insulin and Metrazol as the favourite form of shock treatment. Thereafter, in the succeeding years, Cerletti and his coworkers experimented with thousands of electroshocks in hundreds of animals and patients, and were able to determine its usefulness and safety in clinical practice, with several indications, such as in acute schizophrenia, manic-depressive illness, major depression episodes, etc. His work was very influential, and ECT quickly spread out as a therapeutic procedure all over the world. Despite the fact that it does evoke a grand mal seizure marked by a stereotyped succession of events. Cerletti was noted to be the first person to deliver a stress treatment in which the patient did not suffer any discomfort.

As a result of his experiments, which took him from the psychiatric hospital to the abattoir and the zoologic gardens, Cerletti developed a theory that ECT caused the brain to produce vitalising substances, which he called "agro-agonines" (from the Greek for extreme struggle). He put his theory into practice by injecting patients with a suspension of electroshocked pig brain. Although electroshocked pig brain therapy was used by a few psychiatrists in Italy, France and Brazil it did not become as popular as ECT, which soon replaced metrazol therapy all over the world because it was cheaper, less frightening and more convenient. Cerletti and Bini were nominated for a Nobel Prize for Physiology or Medicine for their work on the treatment in the 1930s.

Today, ECT is most often recommended for use as a treatment for severe depression that has not responded to other treatment. It is occasionally also used in the treatment of mania and catatonia.

== Legacy ==
In his long activity as a psychiatrist and neurologist, Cerletti published 113 original papers, about the pathology of senile plaques in Alzheimer's disease, on the structure of neuroglia, the blood–brain barrier, syphilis, etc. In 1950 he received an honorary degree by the Collège de Sorbonne at the University of Paris, in addition to a long list of other awards and degrees.

Away from his medical work, Cerletti is credited with introducing the idea of white uniforms for alpine troops in order to reduce visibility during the First World War. He also invented artillery missiles with delayed-action fuses. These were used by the Italian and French armies in order to create mine fields between enemy positions.

Cerletti died in Rome on 25 July 1963.
