= Limbiate =

Limbiate Limbiaa (Lombard)
- Comune
- Comune di Limbiate
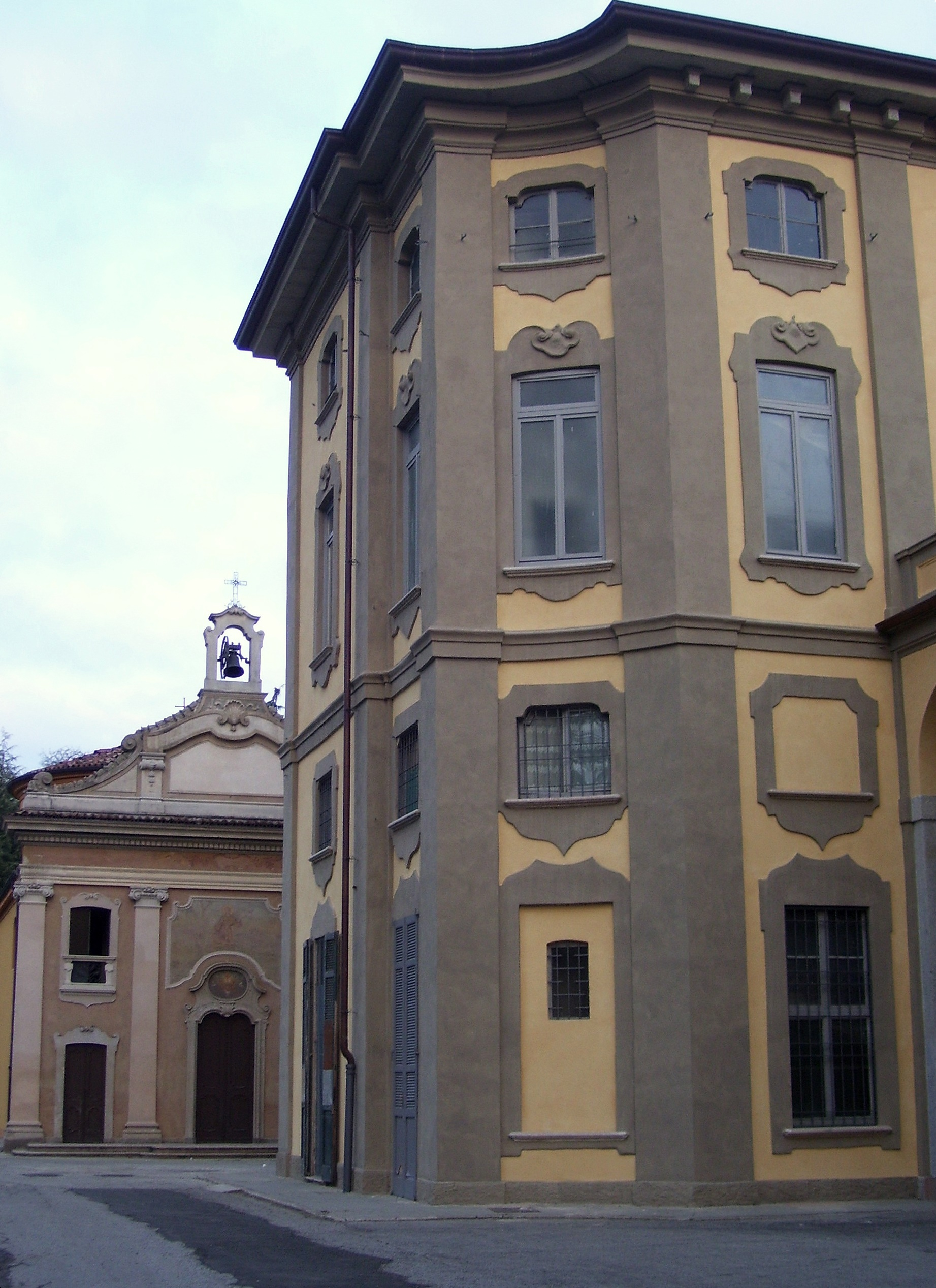
- Villa Pusterla

- Coat of arms

- Location within Italy Location within Lombardy
- Coordinates: 45°36′N 9°8′E
- Country: Italy
- Region: Lombardy
- Province: Monza and Brianza (MB)
- Frazioni: Ceresolo, Mombello, Pinzano, Villaggio dei Giovi, Villaggio del Sole, Villaggio Risorgimento

Government
  - Mayor: Antonio Domenico Romeo

Area
  - Total: 12.4 km^{2} (4.8 sq mi)

Population (30 November 2017)
  - Total: 35,121
  - Density: 2,830/km^{2} (7,340/sq mi)
- Demonym: Limbiatesi
- Time zone: UTC+1 (CET)
  - Summer (DST): UTC+2 (CEST)
- Postal code: 20812
- Dialing code: 02
- Website: Official website

Limbiate (Lombard: Limbiaa [lĩˈbjaː]) is a comune (municipality) in the Province of Monza and Brianza in the Italian region Lombardy, located about 15 kilometres (9 mi) north of Milan. As of 2016, it had a population of 35.279. By decree of the President of the Republic on 26 March 2018 it was elevated to city status.

Limbiate integrates the fraction of Mombello where the neuropsychiatric hospital was located.

== History ==
Like other places in Lombardy, Limbiate's origins are linked to celts migration in pre-roman time and then to Roman Legionary settlements that formed in winter during period of non-belligerence.
