= Gabinetto Vieusseux =

- 43.77139468427455°N 11.25265081310055°E
- Location: Palazzo Strozzi, Florence, Italy
- Established: 1819

Other information
- Website: www.vieusseux.it

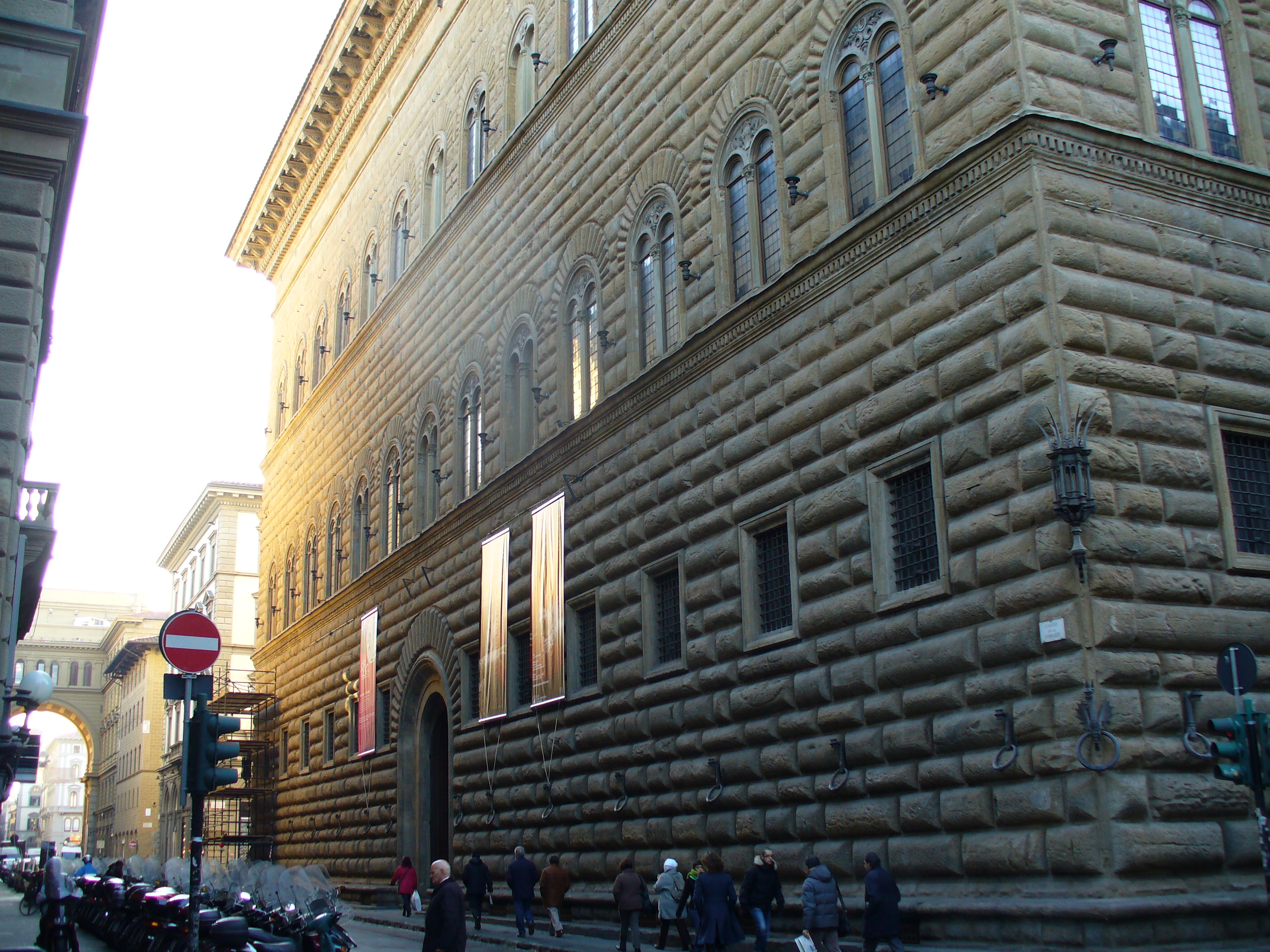
Palazzo Strozzi, location of the library

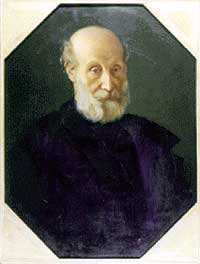
Giovan Pietro Vieusseux

The Gabinetto scientifico-letterario G. P. Vieusseux ("G. P. Vieusseux Scientific and Literary Office") is a library in Florence, Italy, founded in 1819 by Giovan Pietro Vieusseux, a merchant and publisher from Oneglia. It played a vital role in linking the culture of Italy with that of other European countries in the 19th century, and also became one of the chief reference points for the Risorgimento movement.

It began as a reading room that provided leading European periodicals for Florentines and visitors from abroad in a setting that encouraged conversation and the exchange of ideas. A circulating library with the latest publications in Italian, French and English was installed next to the reading room.

Giacomo Leopardi and Alessandro Manzoni frequented the Gabinetto Vieusseux when they were in Florence, as did Stendhal, Schopenhauer, J. F. Cooper, Thackeray, Dostoevsky, George Gissing, Mark Twain, Émile Zola, André Gide, Kipling, Aldous Huxley and D. H. Lawrence. The institute was run privately by the Vieusseux family until 1919 when it became a foundation with a governing body headed by the Mayor of Florence or one of his delegates.

Its work continued in the 20th century under the direction of distinguished men of letters such as Bonaventura Tecchi, Eugenio Montale and, for forty years, Alessandro Bonsanti, who set up three new departments: the Laboratory for the conservation of books damaged in the 1966 flood of the Arno, the Centro Romantico, specializing in studies in romanticism and the 19th century, and the Archivio Contemporaneo, now named after Bonsanti, which houses manuscripts, private papers and private libraries donated by leading figures in 20th-century culture. The library continues to expand according to the criteria laid down by its founder.

The institute also organizes meetings, conferences and exhibitions throughout the year; in 1995 the quarterly review founded by Bonsanti in 1966 Antologia Vieusseux (new series) resumed publication.

== Library ==
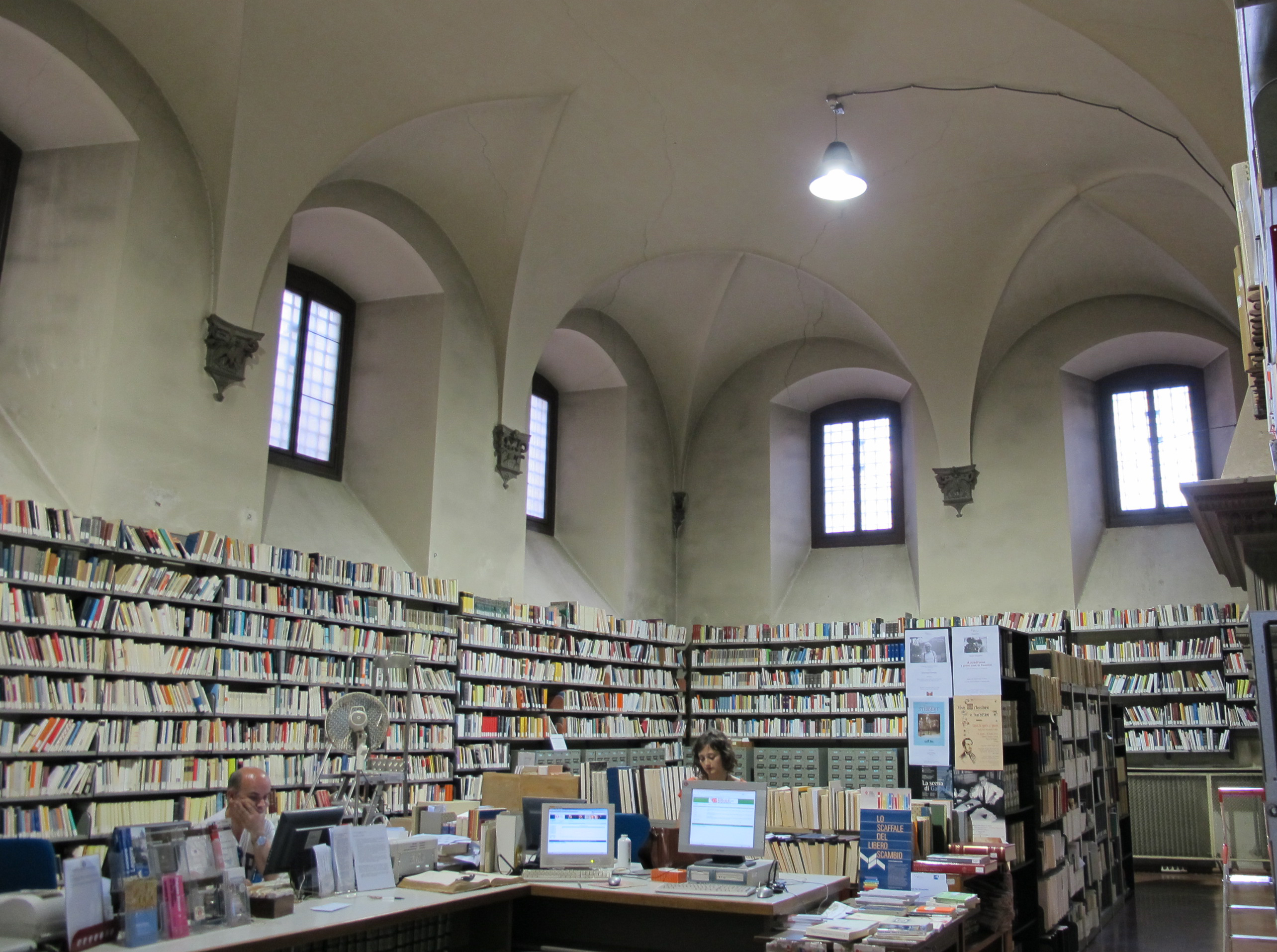

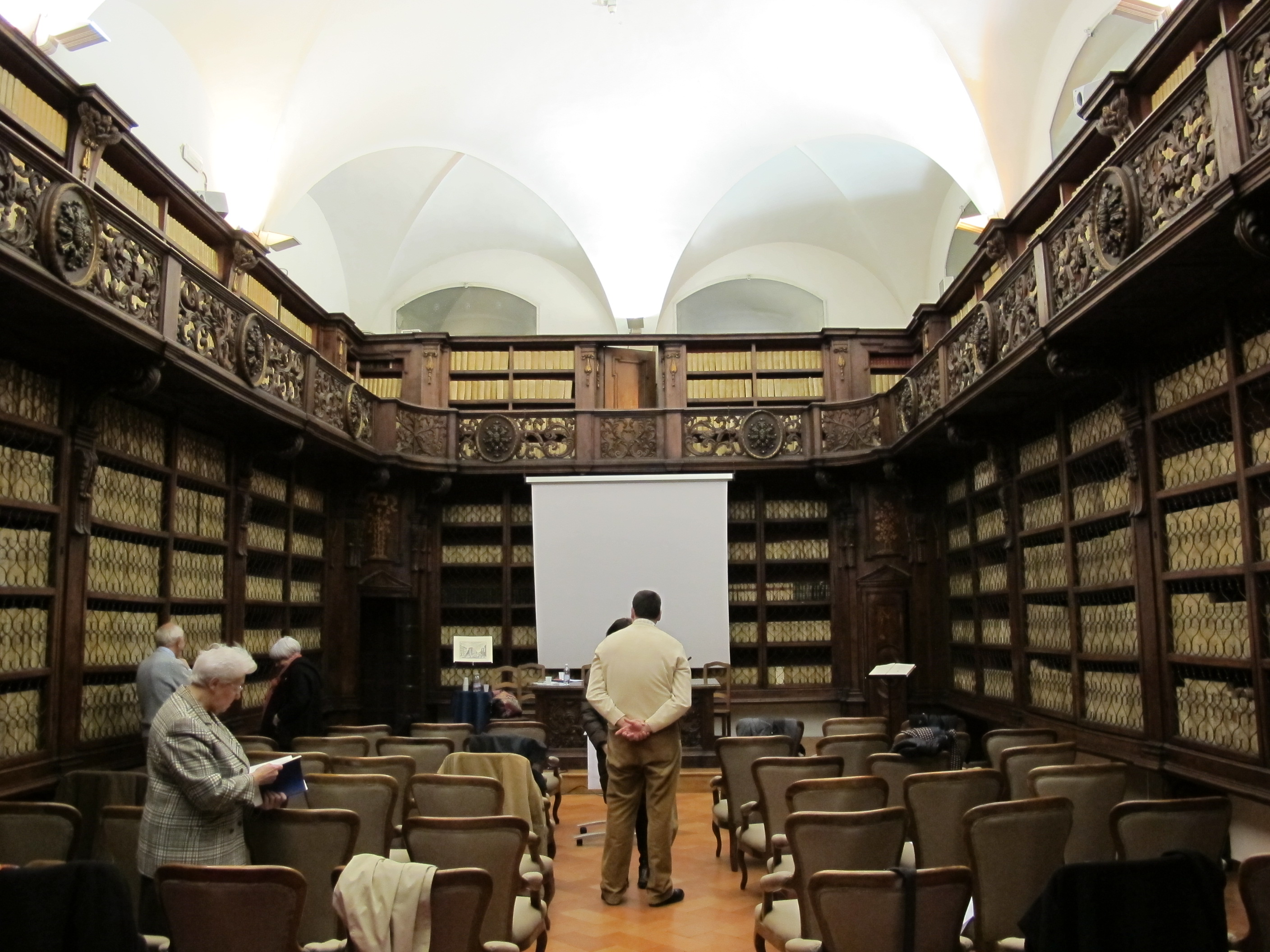

=== The Library’s Holdings ===
The cosmopolitan character of this library during the 19th century, expressed in its two sections, “lending library” and the reading room for journals, remains its unique feature even today, especially for the nature of the collection. Today the library’s collection, expanded through acquisition and numerous donations, amounts to about 300,000 monographs in several languages (Italian, French, English, and some sources in German), offering today full documentation of 19th- and 20th-century literature in the original language and in translation, travel accounts, essays on cultural history of the 19th and 20th centuries, and biographies. The tradition of leisure reading, however, is still provided for with a large collection of detective stories and best-sellers of various genres. In total there are about 2,700 journals, in several languages, of which nearly 600 are from the 19th century; there are about 350 currently circulation journals available.

== Alessandro Bonsanti Contemporary Archives ==
In October 1975 the Contemporary Archives opened in the Gabinetto G.P. Vieusseux under the leadership its director at the time, Alessandro Bonsanti, to whom the archives are now dedicated.

Established with the principal goal of collecting diverse material related to influential contemporary figures, the Archives, housed in the beautiful 14th-century rooms of the city-owned Palazzo Corsini Suarez, distinguishes itself in the landscape of the many institutes established because of its aim to conserve the multi-faceted nature of disciplines of study, and therefore of those disciplines’ documentation. This documentation ranges from creative literature (narrative and poetry) to literary criticism, from music to theater, from architecture to painting, from photographs to art criticism.

Currently the Archives house more than 130 “funds,” or collections related to individual authors, in total more than 500,000 documents and 70,000 volumes added by donation, deposit, and loan. Once organized and inventoried, these collections are available to the public according to the precise rules intended to protect this important cultural resource.

== Conditions for access ==
Consultation is available by appointment and requires a letter of introduction for students.

== Conservation services ==
The Conservation Center is the division of the Gabinetto Vieusseux that oversees the physical protection of the collection housed in the Institute. It collaborates with the other divisions to look over all activities that could interfere with the integrity of the documents and collections: use, storage, maintenance, exhibitions, and reproductions, etc. Making up the Center are the restoration laboratory, a laboratory for photographs and microfilm, a division for the digitalization of documents, and a specialized library that is also open to the public. The Center has created data bases in order to manage its activities; in particular, it has created files of the surveys in order to analyze the documents’ state of conservation continuously. These files keep track of the most important technical features subject to eventual mutation or damage as well as characteristic elements of the documents. The surveys, which are useful for research and can set aside specific documents, are carried out systematically on the collections in the Contemporary Archives and make up a data bank full of information about particular written materials and documented mediations from the 20th century.

Another data base has been organized for the gathering of works of art (drawings, prints, paintings, and sculpture) in the collections of the Contemporary Archives. By May 2004 there were 1,616 files for as many pieces in the collection. This archive is open to the users of the Institute. The collections of photographic material are also inspected with a detailed analysis of their state of conservation. These files were created using the “scheda F” of the Ministero per i Beni culturali e le attività culturali (BBCC; Ministry for Arts and Culture) as a reference.

== Restoration Laboratory ==
The Restoration Laboratory was opened in 1968 on the premises of Palazzo Acciaiuoli della Certosa, alongside the framework that developed after the November 4, 1966 flood caused enormous damage to the Gabinetto G.P. Vieusseux’s collection. The Recovery Center focused on books published after 1850 and periodicals from 1900 onward, and the Restoration Laboratory treated the oldest materials. These two divisions merged into one laboratory in 1984. In the early seventies, with the return of the full activity of the Gabinetto Vieusseux, the laboratory began to occupy itself with all other needs for the Institute’s restoration, apart from those damaged in the flood. many of the archived materials required even urgent assistance, especially with the opening of the Contemporary Archives in 1974. Also in the mid-seventies, the Restoration Laboratory connected with many other institutes and agencies and assisted them with restorations, collaborations, and advice. Also, visits from volunteers and trainees from various countries became a regular occurrence. Between December 1988 and January 1999, the laboratory transferred to its current location on Via Maggio. Four restorers work in the laboratory.

== Specialized Library ==
The Specialized Library collects works that deal with the various aspects of the physical preservation of documents. It is open to the public during the same hours as the Contemporary Archives. It has a catalogue that is completely computerized and organized by subject that allows for perusal of the periodicals. It holds 63 periodicals and about 600 publications among monographs and other resources, amounting to about 5,350 entries.

== Centro Romantico ==
The Centro Romantico, using the documents preserved at the Institute as a point of departure, promotes research and initiatives about European society in the 19th century. In particular, however, this division of the Gabinetto Vieusseux examines the acquisition and diffusion of knowledge and the comparisons of many different cultures and experiences, which characterized Giovan Piero Vieusseux’s salon. This dissemination of information, the vast number of conversations through letters from different countries, the network of correspondence among booksellers, the circulation of publications and reviews, the documentation of scientific progression, the reading public, the illumination of social and economic issues, and the attention to visitors from abroad were all fundamental for the initiatives that led to the creation of the Gabinetto Vieusseux; they also took note of a great number of influential non-political characters in Florence and Tuscany’s recent history. The activity of research and the distribution of its findings extend into manifold aspects of our current culture, and the consultation and the support of the research make up a part of the duties of the Centro.

Among the works currently in progress are the computerized thematic and nominative index of the Vieusseux Letters, the catalogue of the correspondences of Giovan Pietro Vieusseux, and the computerized archive concerning European society in the 19th century, which is still in the stages of preparation. In November 1997, the Italian Society for the Study of the Relationships Between Science and Literature was founded with its center close to the Centro Romantico. Fosco Maraini’s Asian Library and Photograph Archives were given to the Centro Romantico thanks to the support of the Ente Cassa di Risparmio di Firenze.
