= Auguste Deter =

First person diagnosed with Alzheimer's disease (1850–1906)

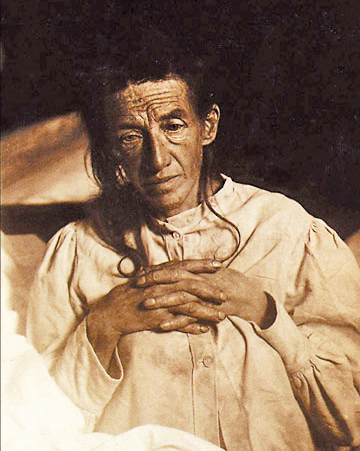
- Deter in 1901
- Born: Johanna Auguste Caroline Hochmann; 16 May 1850; Kassel, Electorate of Hesse
- Died: 8 April 1906 (aged 55); Frankfurt, German Empire
- Known for: First diagnosis of Alzheimer's
- Spouse: Carl August Wilhelm Deter (m. 1873)

Auguste Deter (German pronunciation: [aʊ̯ˈɡʊstə ˈdeːtɐ], née Hochmann; 16 May 1850 – 8 April 1906) was a German woman notable for being the first person to be diagnosed with Alzheimer's disease.

== Life ==
Deter was born in Kassel, Hesse-Kassel on 16 May 1850. Born into a working-class family, Auguste had three siblings and was a daughter of Johannes Hohmann.

Deter's father died when she was young. Even though Deter's family was impoverished, she was well-educated. She attended school in Cassell, and it is speculated that she may have been a student of Alois Alzheimer's grandfather, Johann. He was a schoolmaster in Cassell during the time Deter attended school. Further education was not possible for Auguste due to social norms and her family's financial situation.

Deter started work as a full-time seamstress assistant at the age of 14. She continued this career until she married Carl August Wilhelm Deter on 1 May 1873, at the age of 22.

In 1888, Carl began work as a railway clerk. After marrying Carl, Deter moved to Frankfurt, Germany, where she was a full-time housewife. Carl described their marriage as "happy and harmonious". The couple had one daughter named Thekla.

Deter became ill in the spring of 1901 at the age of 50. She was admitted to a psychiatric hospital later that year in November, where she lived for the rest of her life.

Auguste and Carl were married for 33 years until her death on 8 April 1906 at the age of 55.

== Onset of disease ==
During the late 1890s, Deter exhibited a rapid escalation in memory loss and started showing symptoms of dementia, such as loss of memory, delusions, and even temporary vegetative states. In March 1901, Auguste's behavior started to become out of control. She began to accuse Carl of being adulterous and soon became jealous. Auguste started to become inattentive with housework, purposely hid objects and lost her capacity to cook. She also developed insomnia, which caused her to drag sheets outside the house and scream for hours in the middle of the night. She became paranoid over neighbors and strangers as she believed someone was out to kill her.

As a railway worker, Carl was unable to provide adequate care for his wife and was given recommendations by a local doctor to admit her into a mental hospital. She later was admitted to a mental institution, the Institution for the Mentally Ill and for Epileptics (Irrenschloss) in Frankfurt on 25 November 1901. There, she was examined by Alois Alzheimer.

Carl visited Deter whenever possible, though he struggled to make payments for her care and stay. It would have been more financially efficient to spend the time at work. Having difficulty keeping up with the payments, Carl continued insisting on getting her into a more affordable facility. Such a transfer would remove Deter from Alzheimer's care, but Carl continued to persist in transferring Deter. When asking Alzheimer for an arrangement of hospital transfers, Alzheimer discouraged him from such a decision; instead, he offered him an agreement for her to continue to receive care without cost in exchange for her medical records and brain after death, to which Carl gave a signed consent.

== Treatment ==
Alzheimer asked her many questions, then later asked again to see if she would remember. He asked her to write her name. She tried to, but would forget the rest and repeat: "I have lost myself." (German: Ich habe mich verloren.) He later put her in an isolation room for a while. When he released her, she would run out screaming, "I will not be cut. I do not cut myself."

After many years, she became completely addled with dementia, muttering to herself. She died on 8 April 1906. More than a century later, her case was re-examined with modern medical technologies, where a genetic cause was found for her disease by scientists from Gießen and Sydney. The results were published in the journal of The Lancet Neurology. According to this paper, a mutation in the PSEN1 gene was found, which alters the gamma-secretase function and is known as a possible cause of early-onset Alzheimer's disease. However, the results could not be replicated in a more recent paper published in 2014 where "Auguste D's DNA revealed no indication of a nonsynonymous hetero- or homozygous mutation in the exons of APP, PSEN1, and PSEN2 genes comprising the already known familial AD mutations." It is suggested that Auguste's daughter Thekla would have had a 50% chance of inheriting the PSEN1 gene and developing Alzheimer's, although there is no recorded information of her developing such an illness.

Alzheimer concluded that she had no sense of time or place. She could barely remember details of her life and frequently gave answers that had nothing to do with the question and were incoherent. Her moods changed rapidly between anxiety, mistrust, withdrawal and 'whininess.' They could not let her wander around the wards because she would accost other patients who would then assault her. It was not the first time that Alzheimer had seen a complete degeneration of the psyche in patients, but previously the patients had been in their seventies. Deter piqued his curiosity because she was much younger. In the weeks following, he continued to question her and record her responses. She frequently responded, "Oh, God!" and, "I have lost myself, so to speak." She seemed to be consciously aware of her helplessness. Alzheimer called it the "Disease of Forgetfulness".

== Death and legacy ==
In 1902, Alzheimer left the Irrenschloss (Castle of the Insane), as the institution was known colloquially, to take up a position in Munich, but he made frequent calls to Frankfurt inquiring about Deter's condition. On 9 April 1906, Alzheimer received a call that Auguste Deter had died. He requested that her medical records and brain be sent to him. Her chart recorded that in the last years of her life her condition had deteriorated considerably. Her death was the result of sepsis caused by an infected bedsore. With the aid of the Italian physicians Gaetano Perusini and Francesco Bonfiglio, he carefully examined her brain to discover senile plaques and neurofibrillary tangles. These are the hallmark of Alzheimer's disease as scientists know it today. Deter would have been diagnosed with early-onset Alzheimer's disease if seen by a modern doctor.

== Rediscovery of medical record ==
In 1996, Konrad Maurer and his colleagues, Stephan Volk and Hector Gerbaldo, rediscovered the medical records of Auguste Deter. In these documents, Alzheimer had recorded his examination of his patient, including her answers to his questions:

"What is your name?"
"Auguste."
"Family name?"
"Auguste."
"What is your husband's name?" - she hesitates, finally answers:
"I believe... Auguste."
"Your husband?"
"Oh, my husband."
"How old are you?"
"Fifty-one."
"Where do you live?"
"Oh, you have been to our place."
"Are you married?"
"Oh, I am so confused."
"Where are you right now?"
"Here and everywhere, here and now, you must not think badly of me."
"Where are you at the moment?"
"We will live there."
"Where is your bed?"
"Where should it be?"

Around midday, Deter ate pork and cauliflower.

"What are you eating?"
"Spinach." (She was chewing meat.)
"What are you eating now?"
"First I eat potatoes and then horseradish."
"Write a '5'." [German: fünf]
She writes: "A woman" [Frau]
"Write an '8'." [acht]
She writes: "Auguse" (sic, while she is writing she repeatedly says, "I have lost myself, so to speak.")
