= Oskar Fischer =

Czech scientist (1876–1942)

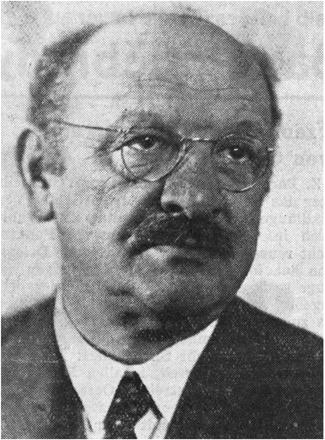
- Portrait c. 1930s
- Born: 12 April 1876; Slaný, Bohemia
- Died: 28 February 1942 (aged 65); Terezin, Czechoslovakia
- Education: Prague University; Strasbourg University
- Medical career
- Profession: Doctor
- Field: Psychiatry; Neuropathology
- Institutions: German University in Prague
- Research: Dementia; Alzheimer disease

Oskar Fischer (12 April 1876 – 28 February 1942) was a Czech academic, psychiatrist and neuropathologist whose studies on dementia and Alzheimer's disease were rediscovered in 2008.

== Early life and education ==
Fischer was born into a German-speaking Jewish family in Slaný in central Bohemia, 25 km northwest of Prague, on 12 April 1876. His father was the manager of an agricultural estate there. He completed primary and secondary education in Slaný. Then he attended the medical schools of both Prague University and Strasbourg University, and graduated from Prague University in 1900.

== Career ==
Fischer began his career at the department of pathological anatomy of German University in 1900. Next, he joined the department of psychiatry of the same university in 1902, and worked there until 1919. Fischer served as a physician-in-chief at the division of neurology and psychiatry of the second garrison hospital in Prague during World War I, and treated many soldiers who had experienced mental difficulties while fighting on the Eastern Front. After challenging and criticising German medical doctor Halbhuber, his chief at the division, Fischer was transferred to barracks hospital in Pardubice in eastern Bohemia and served there until the end of the war. In Pardubice, he met Franziska, his prospective wife, working as a voluntary nurse with the Red Cross. Later, they had two children, the twins Lotte and Heinz. Fischer left his tenure at the German University in 1939 and opened a private office for neurology and psychiatry in Prague where he worked until 1941.

=== Studies on Alzheimer's disease ===
Fischer was a member of the Prague neuropathological school headed by Arnold Pick during his studies in German University. This school was one of the two neuropathological schools (the other one was in Munich headed by Emil Kraepelin where Alois Alzheimer worked) framed Alzheimer's disease through empirical discoveries. In fact, these schools were rivals, leading to the designation of the disease as "Alzheimer's disease" in the Emil Kraepelin's book entitled Psychiatry (1910). Because the inclusion of this disease with Alzheimer's name in the book made the Munich school superior over the Prague school.

Fischer supposedly (like Alois Alzheimer) employed new staining and autopsy results, and described "senile plaques" that are still accepted as the characteristic of the disease in addition to "neurofibrillary tangles" discovered by Alzheimer. Both Fischer and Alzheimer argued that senile plaques may be formed by microorganisms. In June 1907, based on the reports of Beljahow that had been later affirmed by Redlich and Leri Fischer argued that 'miliary necrosis' should be regarded as a marker of senile dementia. Then he published an article in 1907, reporting histopathological findings on senile dementia collected from a sample of 16 postmortem brains from elderly subjects. The report described the brain changes at tissual and cellular levels. He developed a comprehensive structural analysis about the changes involving amyloid aggregates observed in the samples. He named these lesions as "Sphaerotrichia cerebri multiplex" and used this term in his subsequent articles published in 1910 and 1912. The samples of his studies included 58 positive cases out of total 275 cases. Fischer's disease (Sphaerotrichia cerebri multiplex) was mainly characterized clinically by presbyophrenia and pathologically by neuritic plaques. Ultimately, both Alzheimer and Fischer agreed on the uniqueness of a new clinicopathological condition, regardless of the age of onset. This condition encompassed a portion of Kraepelin's senile dementia. However, they disagreed on both the clinical and pathological features, especially on the relative significance of neurofibrillary tangles versus neuritic plaques.

=== Rediscovery of his studies on Alzheimer's disease ===
Although Fischer extensively studied and made significant contributions to the identification and description of Alzheimer's disease, his contributions were remained unknown for a long time and recognised through the studies carried out in the historical archives in Prague. On the other hand, although N. C. Berchtold and C. W. Cotman of the University of California, Irvine School of Medicine reported Fischer's research on the disease and the competition between the two medical schools in 1998, Fischer's studies did not become locus of interest until 2008. Michel Goedert of the MRC laboratory of molecular biology at Cambridge University uncovered Fischer's significance after his study in the archives of Charles University in Prague in 2008. He also interviewed Fischer's relatives and Czech researchers studying on the disease. Pavel Kalvach of the Charles University of Prague pointed out in 2009 that Fischer made arguably even much more important contributions than Alois Alzheimer to the description of the disease. The reasons for neglecting Fischer's contributions included the nationalist tensions and the anti-Semitic approach of his period as well as the academic competition between the Prague and Munich neuropathology schools.

== Arrest by Gestapo and death ==
Nearly three years after the German occupation of Czechoslovakia, Fischer was arrested by the Gestapo in 1941. He was detained in small fortress in Terezin (Theresienstadt) in northwestern Bohemia, which was set up near Prague. He died at the age of 65 in the camp on 28 February 1942 after being beaten to death.
