= Francesco Bonaini =

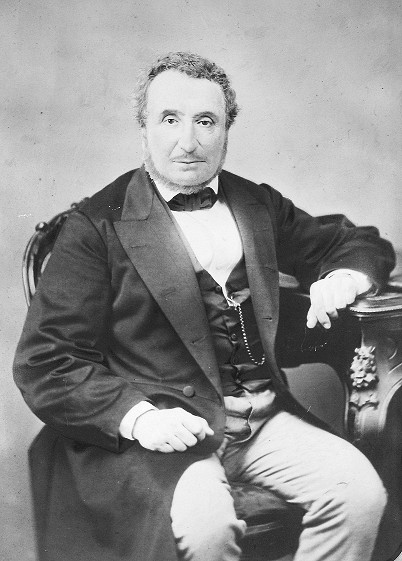
Francesco Bonaini

Francesco Bonaini (Livorno, 20 July 1806 - Collegigliato, 28 August 1874) was a philologist, paleographer and Italian archivist.

== Biography ==
Bonaini was born into a Catholic family with Jewish heritage. Bonaini's father, Domenico, was the son of a Jew who had converted to Catholicism, and committed suicide due to a mental illness before Francesco embarked on his ecclesiastical career.

Francesco Bonaini first studied at the University of Pisa and graduating in utroque iure (both civil and ecclesiastical law) in 1825, before continuing with theology in 1826. In the following fourteen years, Bonaini mainly devoted himself to analysing the historical archives in Pisa, his place of study, focusing in particular on reconstructing the city's medieval history and trade relations with other principalities and cities during what was Pisa's golden age as a maritime republic.

In the fall of 1849, Bonaini became acquainted with Johann Friedrich Böhmer, an important member of the Central Management of the German Historical Monument (MGH) and famous publisher of the Regesta Imperii, who went to Florence to carry out archive research on the documents Imperial, urged him to accept the request of the Tuscan government for his intervention in favor of the reorganization of the Florentine archives.

From 1856 he was the Chief of the Archives of Tuscany, and could thus contribute to the reorganization of both the Florentine (1852–55) and Tuscan archives, thanks also to the contribution of notable collaborators such as Cesare Guasti, Salvatore Bongi, Giovanni Sforza.

He succeeded in reorganizing to apply some new ideas and to realize that historical method which still today forms the basic element of the work of all archivists. After the unification of Italy, the reigning of Emilia, Marche and Umbria began.

Noteworthy was also his work as academician and secretary of the Academy of Crusca.
