= Bielschowsky stain =

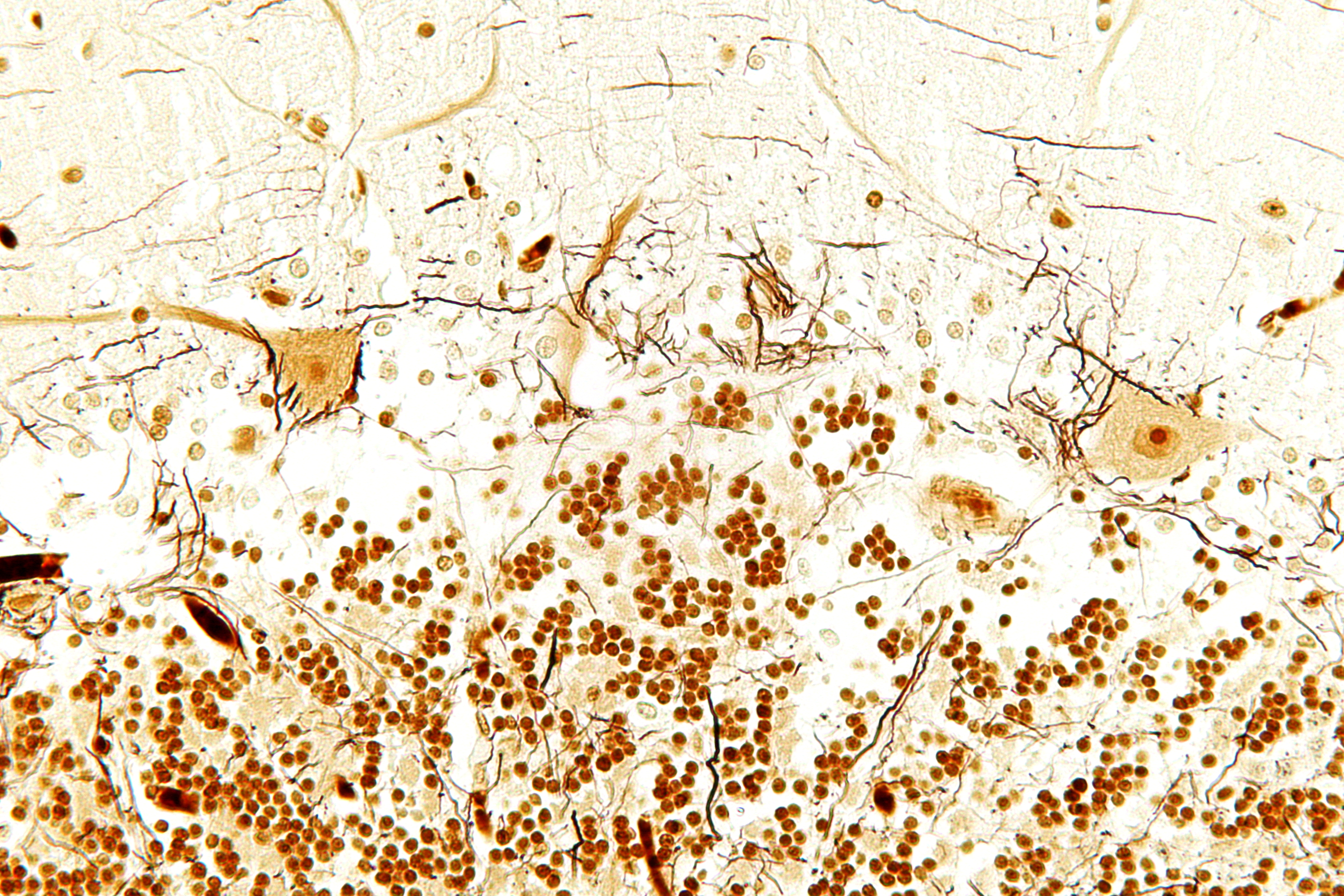
Bielschowsky silver stain showing the processes of basket cells in the cerebellum.

The Bielschowsky technique is a silver impregnation method used in histochemistry for the visualization of nerve fibers, including multipolar interneurons in the cerebellum.

The method is attributed to German neurologist and neurohistologist Max Bielschowsky (1869–1940), who made improvements over the previous method developed by Ramon y Cajal (1852–1934).

== See also ==
- Immunohistochemistry
- Luxol fast blue stain
- Neurofilament
