= Alois Alzheimer =

German psychiatrist and neuropathologist (1864–1915)

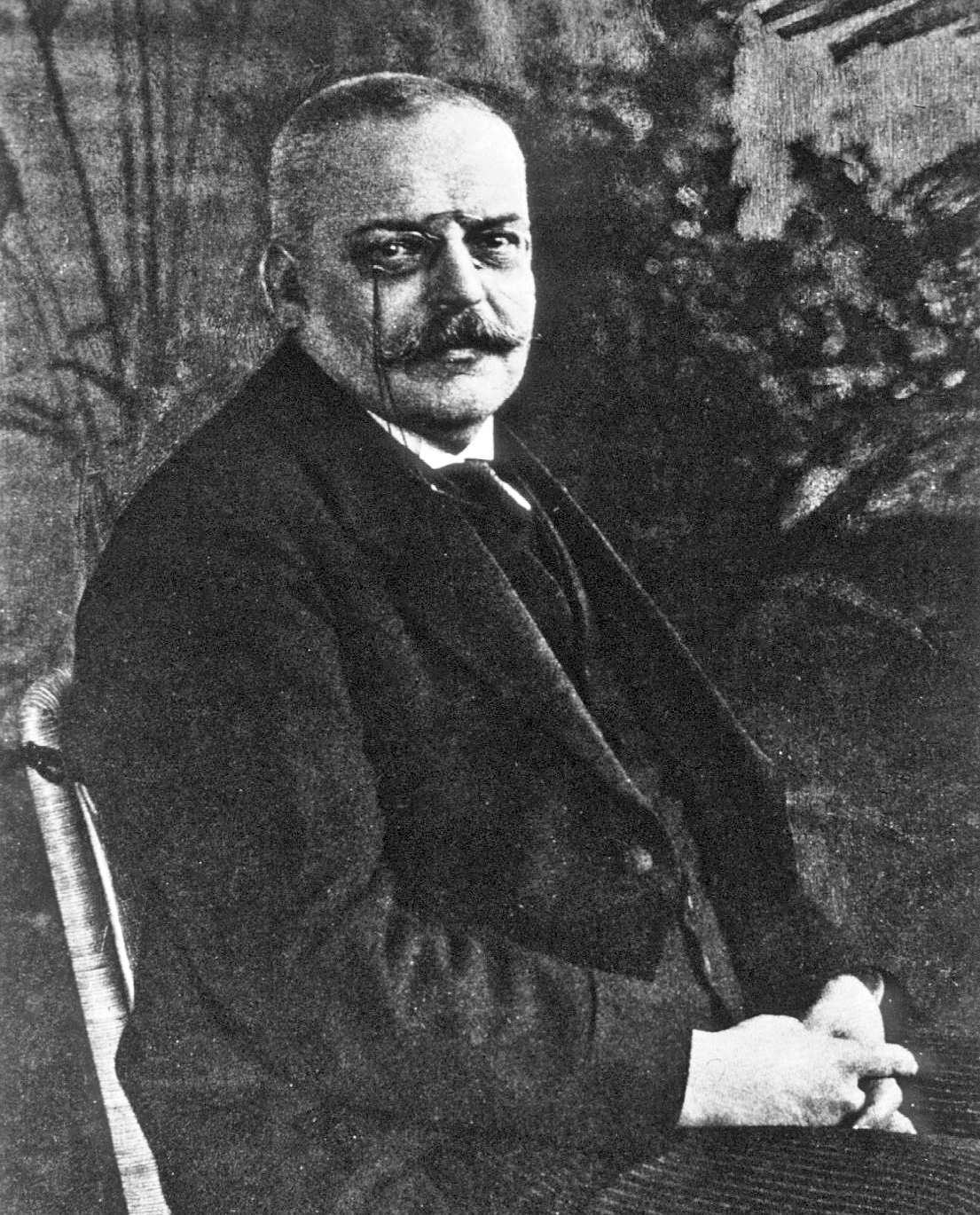
- Born: 14 June 1864; Marktbreit, Bavaria
- Died: 19 December 1915 (aged 51); Breslau, Prussia, German Empire
- Education: University of Tübingen; University of Würzburg; Humboldt University of Berlin
- Known for: First published case of "presenile dementia" (Alzheimer's disease)
- Spouse: Cecilie Simonette Nathalie Geisenheimer (m. 1894; died 1901)
- Children: 3
- Medical career
- Profession: Psychiatrist, physician
- Institutions: Institute for the Insane and Epileptic ("Irrenschloss"), Frankfurt; LMU Munich; Silesian Friedrich Wilhelm University in Breslau
- Sub-specialties: Neuropathology

Alois Alzheimer (/ˈɑːltshaɪmər/ AHLTS-hy-mər, German: [ˈaːlɔɪs ˈʔaltshaɪmɐ]; 14 June 1864 – 19 December 1915) was a German psychiatrist, neuropathologist and colleague of Emil Kraepelin. He is credited with identifying the first published case of "presenile dementia", which Kraepelin later identified as Alzheimer's disease.

== Early life and education ==
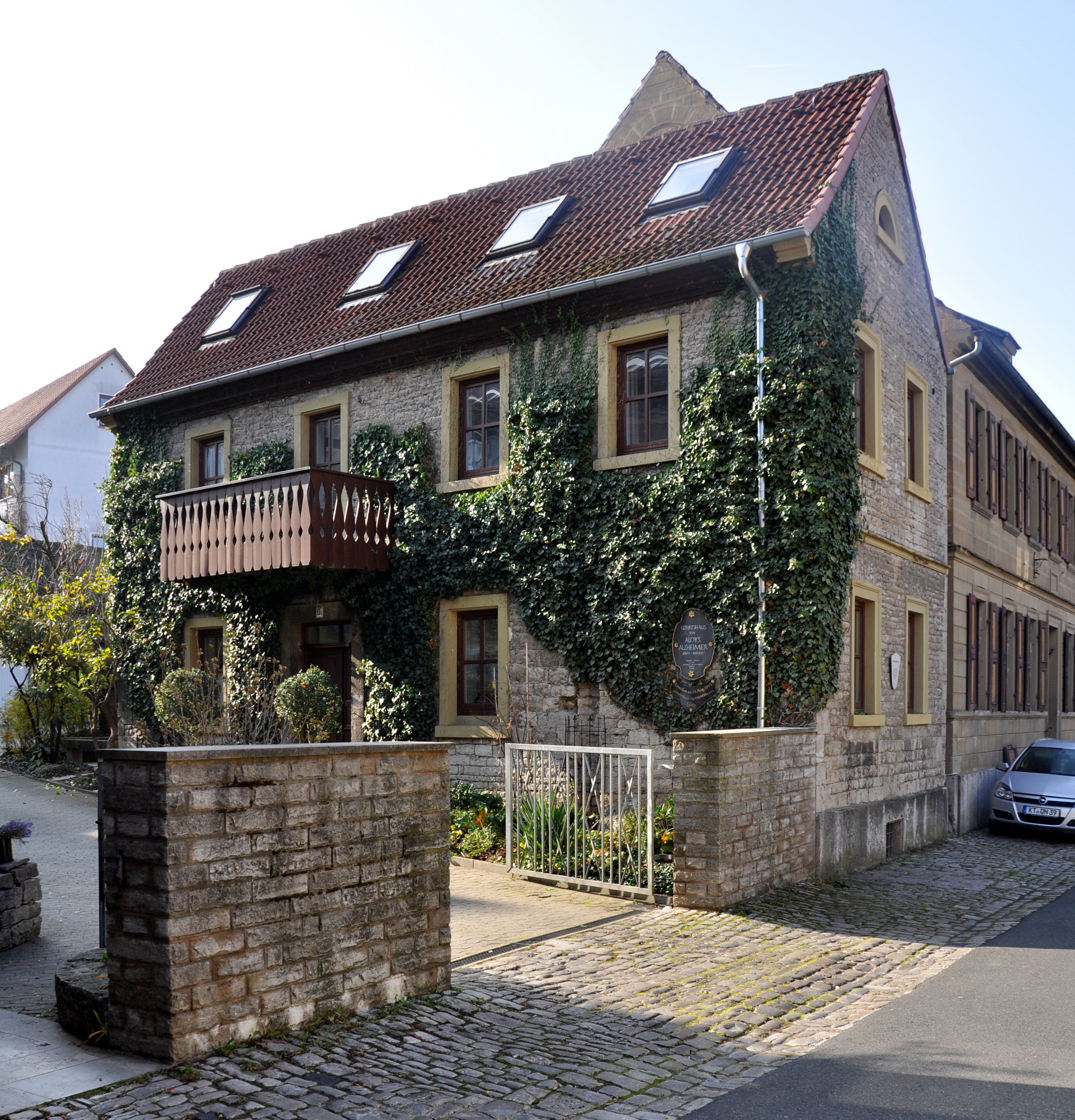
Alzheimer's birthplace

Alzheimer was born in Marktbreit, Bavaria, on 14 June 1864, the son of Anna Johanna Barbara Sabina and Eduard Román Alzheimer. His father served in the office of notary public in the family's hometown. The family was devoutly Catholic.

The Alzheimers moved to Aschaffenburg when Alois was still young in order to give their children an opportunity to attend the Royal Humanistic Gymnasium (high school). After graduating with Abitur in 1883, Alzheimer studied medicine at University of Berlin, University of Tübingen, and University of Würzburg. In his final year at university, he was a member of a fencing fraternity, and even received a fine for disturbing the peace while out with his team. In 1887, Alzheimer graduated from Würzburg as Doctor of Medicine.

== Career ==
In 1888, Alzheimer spent five months assisting mentally ill women before he took an office in the city mental asylum in Frankfurt, the Städtische Anstalt für Irre und Epileptische (Asylum for Lunatics and Epileptics). Emil Sioli, a psychiatrist, was the dean of the asylum. Another neurologist, Franz Nissl, began to work in the same asylum with Alzheimer. Together, they conducted research on the pathology of the nervous system, specifically the normal and pathological anatomy of the cerebral cortex. Alzheimer was the co-founder and co-publisher of the journal Zeitschrift für die gesamte Neurologie und Psychiatrie, though he never wrote a book that he could call his own.

While at the Frankfurt asylum, Alzheimer also met Emil Kraepelin, one of the best-known German psychiatrists of the time. Kraepelin became a mentor to Alzheimer, and the two worked very closely for the next several years. When Kraepelin moved to Munich to work at the Royal Psychiatric Hospital in 1903, he invited Alzheimer to join him.

At the time, Kraepelin was doing clinical research on psychosis in senile patients; Alzheimer, on the other hand, was more interested in the lab work of senile illnesses. They faced many challenges involving the politics of the psychiatric community. For example, formal and informal arrangements were made among psychiatrists at asylums and universities to receive cadavers.

In 1904, Alzheimer completed his habilitation at the Ludwig-Maximilians-Universität München (LMU), where he was appointed as a professor in 1908. Afterward, he left Munich for the Silesian Friedrich Wilhelm University in Breslau in 1912, where he accepted a post as professor of psychiatry and director of the Neurologic and Psychiatric Institute. His health deteriorated shortly after his arrival so that he was hospitalized. He died three years later.

Alzheimer is known for having a variety of medical interests including vascular diseases of the brain, early dementia, brain tumors, forensic psychiatry and epilepsy.

=== Auguste Deter ===
In 1901, Alzheimer observed a patient at the Frankfurt asylum named Auguste Deter. The 51-year-old patient had strange behavioral symptoms, including a loss of short-term memory; she became his obsession over the coming years. Auguste Deter was a victim of the politics of the time in the psychiatric community; the Frankfurt asylum was too expensive for her husband. Herr Deter made several requests to have his wife moved to a less expensive facility, but Alzheimer intervened in these requests. Auguste D., as she was known, remained at the Frankfurt asylum, where Alzheimer had made a deal to receive her records and brain upon her death, paying for the remainder of her stay in return.

On 8 April 1906, Auguste Deter died, and Alzheimer had her medical records and brain brought to Munich where he was working in Kraepelin's laboratory. With two Italian physicians, he used the newly developed Bielschowsky stain to identify amyloid plaques and neurofibrillary tangles. These brain anomalies became identifiers of what is now known as Alzheimer's disease.

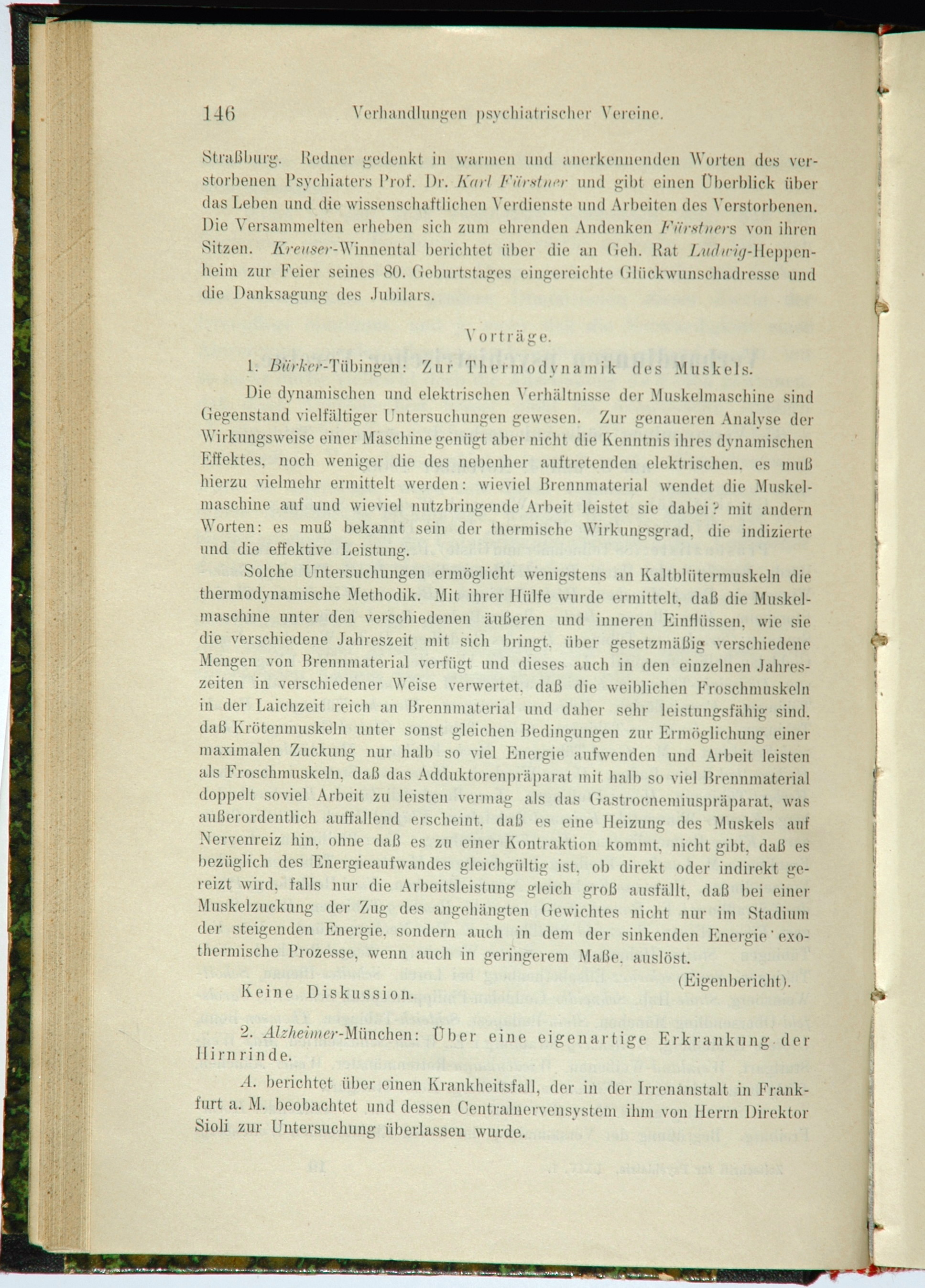
First description of Alzheimer's dementia (1906)

On 3 November 1906, Alzheimer discussed his findings on the brain pathology and symptoms of presenile dementia publicly, at the Tübingen meeting of the Southwest German Psychiatrists. The attendees at this lecture seemed uninterested in what he had to say. The lecturer that followed Alzheimer was to speak on the topic of "compulsive masturbation", which the audience of 88 individuals was so eagerly awaiting that they sent Alzheimer away without any questions or comments on his discovery of the pathology of a peculiar case of early-onset dementia.

Following his presentation, Alzheimer published a short paper summarizing his presentation; in 1907 he wrote a longer paper detailing the disease and his findings. It became known as Alzheimer's disease in 1910, when Kraepelin named it so in the chapter on "Presenile and Senile Dementia" in the 8th edition of his Handbook of Psychiatry. By 1911, his description of the disease was being used by European physicians to diagnose patients in the US.

Additional case descriptions by Alzheimer and his colleagues continued in the following years, including older patients than the early-onset dementia of Auguste Deter. Alzheimer eventually conceived "his" disease as mainly characterized clinically by a severe dementia with instrumental symptoms, and pathologically by extended neurofibrillary tangles. He debated fiercely with Oskar Fischer, a German-speaking pathologist from Prague, who instead emphasized on the importance of neuritic plaques and of presbyophrenia as the phenotype. Finally, it must be highlighted that Fischer–Alzheimer's nosological considerations had less impact than Kraepelin's 1910 Textbook of Psychiatry, which distinguished between "Alzheimer's disease" and senile dementia, including presbyophrenia. This textbook had a strong influence on early 20th century research on senile dementia and played a significant role in the classification of dementia in the following decades.

== Personal life and death ==
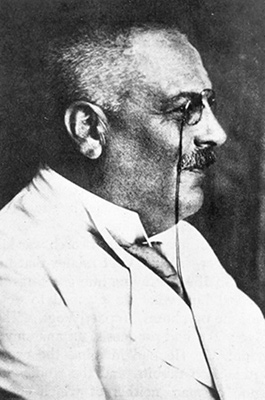
Alzheimer just before his death (c. 1915)

In 1894, Alzheimer married Cecilie Simonette Nathalie Geisenheimer, with whom he had three children. She died in 1901.

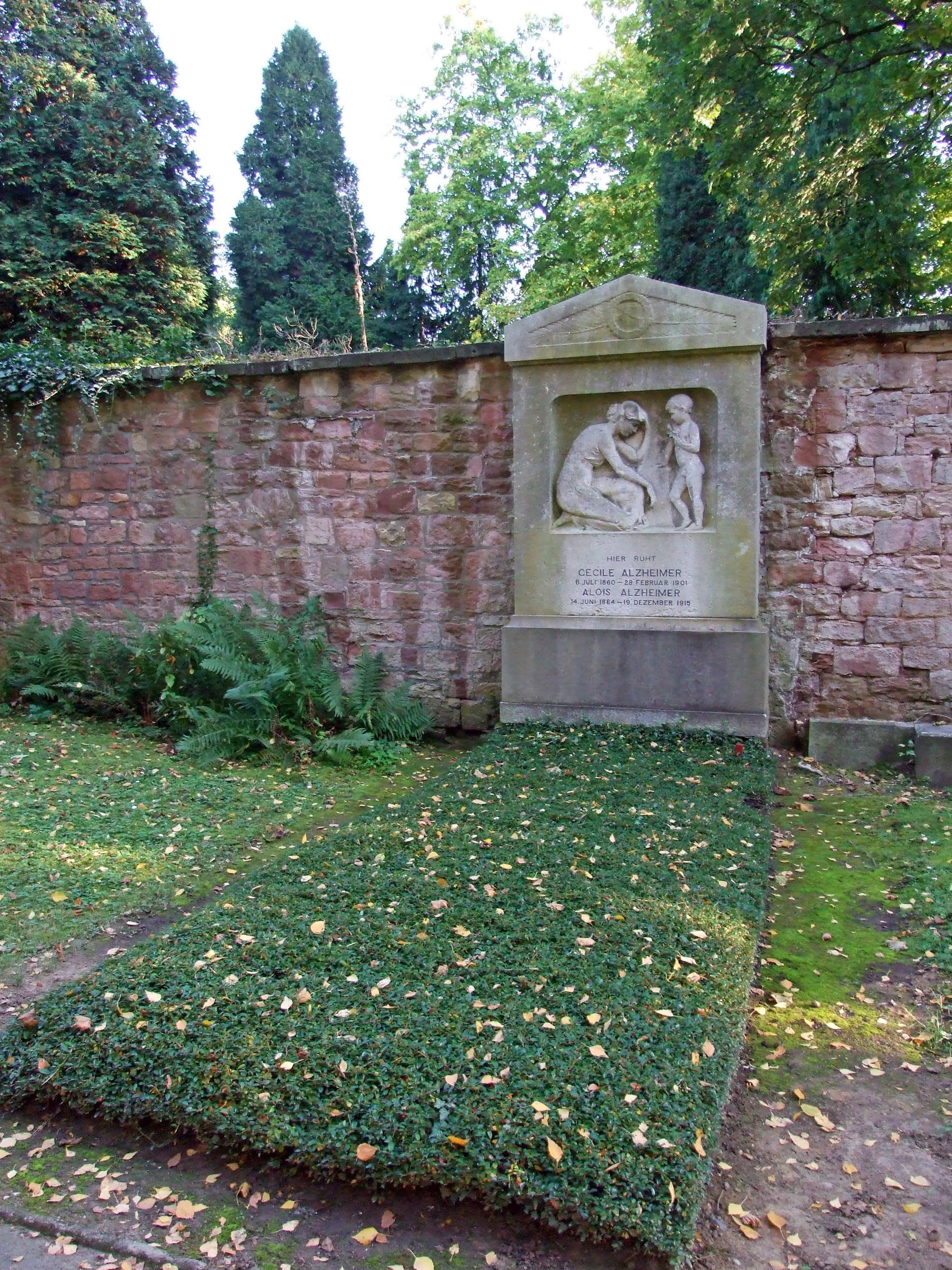
Alzheimer's grave in Frankfurt

In August 1912, Alzheimer fell ill on the train on his way to the University of Breslau, where he had been appointed professor of psychiatry in July 1912. He most probably contracted a streptococcal infection and subsequently developed rheumatic fever, which led to valvular heart disease, heart failure and kidney failure. He died of heart failure on 19 December 1915 at age 51, in Breslau, Silesia (present-day Wrocław, Poland). His body was buried four days later, next to Cecilie's at the Frankfurt Main Cemetery.

== Contemporaries ==
American Solomon Carter Fuller gave a report similar to that of Alzheimer at a lecture five months before Alzheimer. Oskar Fischer was a fellow German psychiatrist, twelve years Alzheimer's junior, who reported twelve cases of senile dementia in 1907 around the time that Alzheimer published his short paper summarizing his presentation.

Alzheimer and Fischer had different interpretations of the disease, but owing to Alzheimer's short life, they never had the opportunity to meet and discuss their ideas.

== Critics and rediscovery ==
In the early 1990s, critics began to question Alzheimer's findings and form their own hypotheses based on Alzheimer's notes and papers. Amaducci and colleagues hypothesized that Auguste Deter had metachromatic leukodystrophy, a rare condition in which accumulations of fats affect the cells that produce myelin. Claire O'Brien, meanwhile, hypothesized that Auguste Deter actually had a vascular dementing disease.

== See also ==
- Gaetano Perusini
- German inventors and discoverers
