= Morire di classe =

1969 book edited by Franco Basaglia and Franca Ongaro Basaglia

Cover of the first edition (1969) of Morire di classe

Morire di classe. La condizione manicomiale fotografata da Carla Cerati e Gianni Berengo Gardin, first published in 1969, is a polemical work about the conditions in Italian mental hospitals of the time, edited by Franco Basaglia and Franca Ongaro Basaglia and with black and white photographs by Carla Cerati and Gianni Berengo Gardin, an introduction by the Basaglias, and various other texts.

== Background ==
In the 1960s, the psychiatrist Franco Basaglia was the director of a mental hospital in Gorizia. Although expected to run it along traditional, prisonlike lines, Basaglia, his wife Franca Ongaro Basaglia and their team instead reduced the constraints on the patients, so that by 1967 the locks were removed from all of the wards, in line with the ideals of democratic psychiatry. Basaglia wrote about this in a popular book published in 1968, L'istituzione negata. Rapporto da un ospedale psichiatrico (The institution denied: Report from a psychiatric hospital); and the changes he was making became more widely known via a television documentary, I giardini di Abele (The gardens of Abel), made by Sergio Zavoli in 1968 and first transmitted in 1969.

== Photography ==
In the account of the photographer Gianni Berengo Gardin, in 1968, Franco Basaglia asked the photographer Carla Cerati to document the conditions in Italian mental asylums for a magazine. Nervous about this, Cerati asked Berengo Gardin to accompany her; he agreed on condition that he too would take photographs, and he later persuaded Basaglia to turn the work into a book. In the account of the historian John Foot, there is no mention of a magazine, and an early plan for the book called for photographs by both Cerati and Berengo Gardin, both of whom were already known to Basaglia. In the latter account the institutions shown in the book were not to be limited to mental hospitals.

Cerati and Berengo Gardin photographed in four hospitals: at Gorizia (Basaglia's own mental hospital), Colorno (near Parma), Florence and Ferrara. The photographers' degree of freedom varied considerably: they were only once able to enter the Florence asylum (where they were not welcomed by the management), but were very free to work in Gorizia.

Their photography was under other constraints. Although Berengo Gardin photographed meetings among patients at Gorizia, and scenes where Basaglia was present, these were omitted from the book: Basaglia wanted to avoid the impression of paternalism, and Foot charges that the photographs of Gorizia avoid its current state (unusually liberated for the time) and merely depict its repressive past, as a plank in an overtly polemical work.

Before publication of the book, and with the encouragement of the politician Mario Tommasini, an exhibition titled La violenza istituzionalizzata was arranged in Parma (later moving to Florence); this was the first public showing of many of the photographs that would later appear in Morire di classe.

Photographs that would later appear in the book were also used within the film I giardini di Abele, for other books, and leaflets.

== Text ==
The book has an introduction by the Basaglias, and also texts by Erving Goffman, Michel Foucault, Paul Nizan, Luigi Pirandello, Primo Levi, Louis Le Guillant and Lucien Bonnafé, Jonathan Swift, Rainer Maria Rilke, Frantz Fanon, Peter Weiss and others.

Foot points out how both the introduction and the text reproduced employ the notion, whether created by Goffman or popularized by him, of the total institution, important in Goffman's 1961 book Asylums, whose Italian translation had been published in 1968. An asylum was totalitarian (Goffman and Foucault), it "colonized" the inmates (Fanon), or it reduced them to the "hollow" people of concentration camps (Levi).

== Book design ==
The photobook Morire di classe. La condizione manicomiale fotografata da Carla Cerati e Gianni Berengo Gardin (Note: Introduced in Bruno Carbone, ed. Gianni Berengo Gardin. Il libro dei libri. Rome: Contrasto due, 2013. ISBN 978-88-6965-444-2.) (Dying because of your class: The condition of asylums photographed by Carla Cerati and Gianni Berengo Gardin) (Note: In English, the book is referred to in many ways: "To die because of class", "Death of a class", etc.) was published by Einaudi in May 1969. Largely edited by Franco Basaglia and the staff of its publisher, Einaudi, the book has a lilac cover and a design that owes much to advertising practice of the time:

Here, the images and photos themselves took centre stage. This was a design object, a political and sociological photobook, a book to be looked at (or looked away from) as much as read. As well as attempting to revolutionize mental health care, the Basaglias (along with Giulio Bollati, who worked for the Turinese publisher Einaudi) were also attempting to transform the world of books and political campaigning. The appearance of Morire di Classe was a memorable moment in the history of the movement, and also in the history of publishing.

Although the photographers are named on the title page, individual photographs are unattributed. Likewise, the book does not say which images are from which asylum. None of those taken in Ferrara are used in this book. Certain photographs, or minor variations of them, are repeated, for a somewhat cinematic effect. (Note: For an example, see the washbasin that is repeated across pages 53 to 56 of the PDF file of the 2008 edition.) For rhetorical effect, there are also photographs not taken in mental hospitals: Foot cites a photograph of a policeman seemingly about to hit a demonstrator or the photographer, and:

[a] shot of rich young people lounging around in a party, with a marble table and expensive paintings on the walls above them, [that] is placed opposite a series of bodies/patients from an asylum, sprawled on the ground and all in uniform. One is in a strait jacket. (Note: The images appear on pp. 34 and 36 respectively of the PDF file of the 2008 edition.)

== Photographic significance ==
The historian David Forgacs has identified Morire di classe as one of three major artistic works to come out of the Italian movement in the late 1960s to reform psychiatric care, the other two being the 1969 book edited by Basaglia, L'istituzione negata and the 1969 television documentary I giardini di Abele; Morire di classe was "in effect the photographic supplement to [these two]."

Although psychiatric patients had long been the subject of photography for classificatory or other purposes, Morire di classe has been called "the first book ever published worldwide to show the cruelties perpetrated against psychiatric patients". Certainly it was a very early one, though Luciano D'Alessandro's Gli esclusi, made in southern Italy with the cooperation of Sergio Piro, was also published in 1969. (Note: Luciano D'Alessandro, Gli esclusi: fotoreportage da un'istituzione totale (Milan: Il Diaframma, 1969; OCLC 25340054).)

Morire di classe was published after I giardini di Abele was first shown. The latter was one of a series of documentaries titled TV7 whose average viewing figure for 1969 was 11 million. It was an early example of an Italian documentary about a total institution, but not the earliest.

Martin Parr and Gerry Badger describe Morire di classe as a "harrowing portrayal of the conditions in an Italian mental asylum", and in the tradition of earlier "polemical photo-documentary books" combining photography and text such as An American Exodus (1939) by Dorothea Lange and Paul S. Taylor and Kan vi være dette Bekendt? (1946) by Karl Roos.

The book raises an issue of photojournalistic ethics. Parr and Badger comment:

[O]ne must be wary of bodies of work featuring mental patients. In cases where those photographed do not know or care what is happening to them, there is a fine line between revelation and exploitation, between compassion and prurient excitement. That line is not crossed here.

[T]he book was an important plank in the eventually successful campaign waged by Franco Basaglia to have the kind of institution shown in Carla Cerati and Gianni Berengo Gardin's photographs closed down.

Asked for a career retrospective to pick the one book among the many he had produced that he would like to be known two hundred years into the future, Berengo Gardin was unable to decide among Italiani, (Note: This book exists in three versions: Italiani (Milan: Federico Motta, 1999; ISBN 88-7179-186-X), with Italian text; Italiani (Arles: Actes Sud, 2000; ISBN 2-7427-2674-8), with French text; Italians = Italiener (Kempen: te Neues, 2000; ISBN 3-8238-5453-4), with German and English texts.) a book on rice cultivation, (Note: This could be Terre di risaia (Rome: Peliti, 2001; ISBN 88-85121-75-6), but is more likely to be the larger Il racconto del riso = An Italian Story of Rice (Rome: Contrasto, 2013; ISBN 978-88-6965-425-1).) and Morire di classe.

== Social impact ==
The book has been widely cited as a factor toward the reform of mental hospitals in Italy (and subsequently in other countries) via law 180 (the "Basaglia law") of 1978. Foot quotes both photographers saying as much, and quotes or cites a number of Italian sources agreeing. Here are two examples from the literature about Berengo Gardin:

Morire di classe [...] was perhaps the most effective means by which [the Basaglias] led their campaign against the hypocrisy of the institutions, and prejudices and platitudes that separated the mentally ill from the rest of society. Once again, a few images proved to be more eloquent and effective than thousands of words.

Morire di classe was to prove fundamental in the process that would lead to the passing, in 1978, of Law 180 (or the Basaglia Reform) and the consequent closure of the country's lunatic asylums.

However, Foot points out that although the book and the timing of its publication would be compatible with the claim for it as being a major factor, the claim that it caused change would be much harder to support. Foot says that "there is no evidence at all for many of the claims that are made about Morire di Classe".

But whatever its influence,

Morire di Classe became a manifesto for Basaglia and the doctors who rejected institutional psychiatry: in that photographic book, photography acted as an interpretation of a social and scientific event but, most of all, it acted as a testimony, as communicative evidence of the horrifying conditions of mental hospitals and the need to abolish them.

== Subsequent editions ==
First published in 1969, (Note: Morire di classe. La condizione manicomiale fotografata da Carla Cerati e Gianni Berengo Gardin. Serie politica, 10. Turin: Giulio Einaudi, 1969. Edited by Franco Basaglia and Franca Ongaro Basaglia. OCLC 464136129) the book was reprinted in the 1970s. In 2008 it was given a new edition, identical but for the addition of texts by the sociologist of politics Maria Grazia Giannichedda and the journalist and photographer Claudio Ernè, as well as an editorial note. (Note: Morire di classe. La condizione manicomiale fotografata da Carla Cerati e Gianni Berengo Gardin. Issue 16 of the journal Sconfinamenti. Muggia: Duemilauno Agenzia Sociale, 2008. Edited by Claudio Ernè and Sergio Serra.)

The photographs also appear in Per non dimenticare: 1968. La realtà manicomiale di "Morire di classe" (1998). (Note: Per non dimenticare: 1968. La realtà manicomiale di "Morire di classe". Turin: Gruppo Abele, 1998. ISBN 88-7670-309-8. Edited by Franca Ongaro Basaglia.)

A larger selection of the photographs by Berengo Gardin (although not those by Cerati) appear in Manicomi: psichiatria e antipsichiatria nelle immagini degli anni settanta (2015). (Note: Gianni Berengo Gardin and Carla Cerati. Manicomi: psichiatria e antipsichiatria nelle immagini degli anni settanta. Rome: Contrasto. 2015. ISBN 978-88-6965-588-3. Edited by Franca Ongaro Basaglia.) (Note: Page about Manicomi Archived 2016-07-06 at the Wayback Machine, Contrasto.)
