= Giorgio Coda =

Italian psychiatrist and academic (1924–1988)

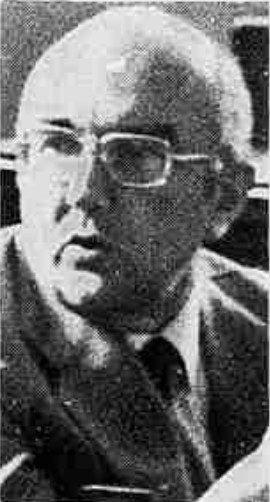
- Italian psychiatrist and professor Giorgio Coda
- Born: 21 January 1924; Turin, Italy
- Died: 23 May 1988 (aged 64); Turin, Italy
- Other names: The electrician (Italian: l'elettricista)
- Known for: Tortures with electroshock

Giorgio Giuseppe Antonio Maria Coda (21 January 1924 – 23 May 1988) was an Italian psychiatrist and academic. He was vicedirector of the mental hospital of Turin (Italian: Ospedale psichiatrico di Torino, in Collegno) and director of villa Azzurra (institute for children), in Grugliasco (Turin) After the trial, that lasted from 1970 to 1974, he was sentenced to five years of imprisonment for patient abuse, as well as to interdiction from the medical profession for five years and payment of legal expenses. He has been nicknamed "The Electrician" (Italian: l'elettricista) for his misuse of the electroshock therapy.

The medical treatment consisted in the application of long-lasting electric current to the genitals and to the head. The treatment did not make the patient lose consciousness and caused strong pain. According to Giorgio Coda, this treatment should have cured the patient. The treatment was called alternatively "electro-massage" (Italian: elettromassaggio) or electroshock depending on whether it was applied to the genitals or to the head. In some cases, the two terms have been used without distinction to denote the generic treatment. The treatment was practiced systematically without anesthesia and, sometimes, without cream and rubber protection device inside the mouth, blowing up the patient's teeth during the treatments. During the trial, Giorgio Coda admitted he had practiced about 5000 "electro-massages" in his career.

The above treatment was also administered to alcoholics, drug addicts, homosexuals and masturbators, and it generated such a strong fear of the treatment, that most patients, at least temporarily, desisted from their acts and behaviors. The trial and the sentence, collected and analyzed in Alberto Papuzzi's book Portami su quello che canta have shown the coercive and punitive purpose of "electro-massages", which in practice were tools of torture and punishment, used on children too (in villa Azzurra).

Deaths during the treatment and suicides occurring in Coda's clinics raise the suspicion that they may have been provoked, at least in part, by the fear of suffering.

At the time the case was interpreted in political terms by some journalists and by the left-wing public opinion, with the bourgeois doctor abusing the weakest members of the proletariat.

== Biography ==
Most of the details about Giorgio Coda's life and academic career is given by Alberto Papuzzi's book Portami su quello che canta.

Born in Turin on 21 January 1924 in a wealthy family, Giorgio Coda is the only child of Carlo Coda, a small industrialist from Turin who "regulated the family life as if it were a factory" and Alda Vacchieri. "At school, Giorgio Coda excelled in conduct. He was not brilliant, but very diligent. A few schoolmates remember him as a grind."

In 1943, Giorgio Coda enrolled in the Faculty of Medicine of the University of Turin and graduated on 15 July 1948 with a thesis about criminal anthropology. On 16 April 1955, Giorgio Coda married Giovanna Roviera. After becoming head physician of the department, on 3 April 1963 he became a professor of psychiatry.

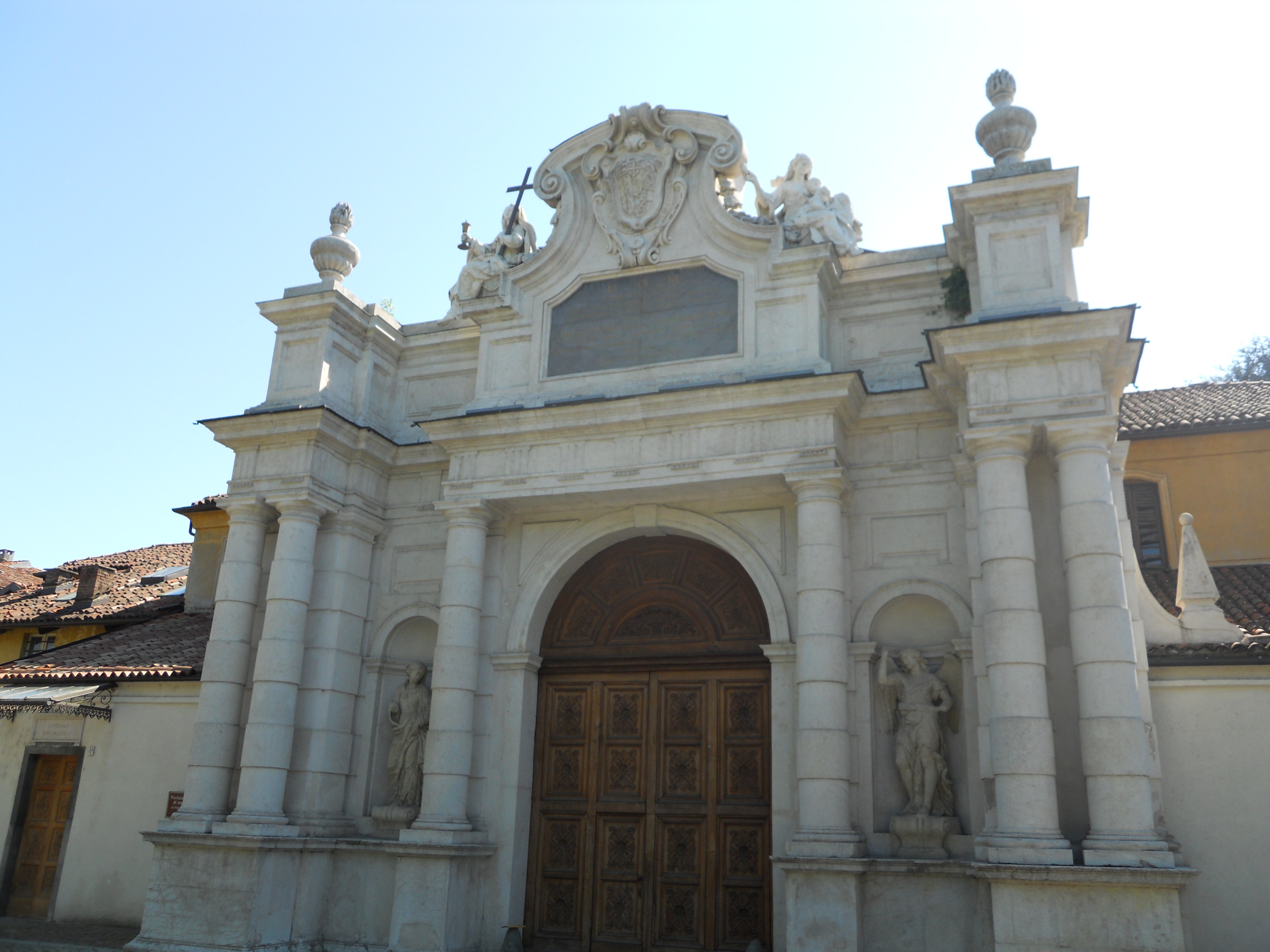
Certosa reale di Collegno, where Turin mental hospital was located until the end of 1970s

The trial started immediately after the Italian court specialized in cases involving minors - Tribunale per i minorenni - received a report from children's social worker Maria Repaci. The report was about the facts of Villa Azzurra. On 7 September, Giogio Coda is indicted for the crime "misuse of the correction systems" and the amnesty is granted, as provided by Italian law (DPR n. 238 del 22 maggio 1970).

On 14 December 1970, an Italian judge receives another report from an Italian association - Associazione per la lotta contro le malattie mentali - which turned out to be crucial in order to start the investigation and the trial. On 11 July 1974, Giorgio Coda was found guilty - "responsible for the crime only for the facts of the mental hospital in Collegno". Subsequently, Giorgio Coda's defender appeals against the sentence.

On 2 December 1977, at around 6:30 pm, four men, all of them members of the Italian Marxist–Leninist terrorist group Prima Linea penetrated into Giorgio Coda's office and shot him in the leg.

At the Court of appeal of Turin, Coda's defense cleverly exploited what the judge Rodolfo Venditti called a "torpedo", a sort of legal trick, based on the fact that Giorgio Coda, as an expert, had been an "honorary judge" (Italian: giudice onorario) of the Juvenile Court (Italian: Tribunale per i miniorenni) in Turin and therefore, since he had been a sort of "judge", he could not be tried in the same court where he had worked as a judge (as stated by Italian law). This detail was perhaps kept hidden by Coda's defence over the whole inferior court trial and the discovery of this led to the annulment of the judgment and to the slowdown of the whole trial. Subsequently, the sentence was sent to the so-called Court of cassation (the last step of Italy's three grades of judgement), but the crimes were time-barred and Coda never served any penalty because of crime prescription.

Coda died in Turin on 23 May 1988, aged 64.

== Effects ==
The case (as well as the book that collected and analyzed the stories, Portami su quello che canta, published in 1977) shocked the public opinion in Italy and sparked a debate. This led to a new law regulating Italian mental hospitals - the so-called Basaglia Law (in 1978, named after its promoter Franco Basaglia) - that abolished the main articles of the previous law - legge n. 36 del 14 febbraio 1904. The Basaglia Law also introduced and regulated the T.S.O. (that stands for Trattamento sanitario obbligatorio - Obligatory Sanitary Treatment), narrowing its scope and defining a multi-level procedure for its enforcement.

In particular, the new law required the intermediation of the mayor and the judge for the application of a T.S.O, the possibility for anyone (including the patient) to ask the T.S.O. to be revoked or modified, the possibility for anyone (including the patient) to appeal against the order validated by the judge, and the possibility for the patient to communicate with anyone during the T.S.O. The patient also has the right to change mental hospital, if possible. The previous law had given too much power to the director of the mental hospital and it did not provide that the patient could communicate with anybody during the treatment.

Even though Basaglia Law did not explicitly provide that mental hospitals should be closed, it, in fact, closed most of Italy's mental hospitals, closure that was completed in 1998. Basaglia Law made Italy one of the first countries to abolish mental hospitals.

== See also ==
- Basaglia Law
- Psychiatric reform in Italy
- Deinstitutionalisation
- Giorgio Antonucci

== Bibliography ==
=== Books ===
- Papuzzi, Alberto (1977). Portami su quello che canta. Processo a uno psichiatra (PDF) (in Italian). Einaudi. ISBN 8806095714. Archived from the original (PDF) on 2020-09-30.
- Bonvicini, Albertino (2011). Fate la storia senza di me (in Italian). ISBN 9788896873267.
- Perissinotto, Alessandro (7 February 2017). "Portami su quello che canta". Quello che l'acqua nasconde (in Italian). Edizioni piemme. ISBN 9788858516942.
- Caselli, Stefano; Valentini, Davide (2014-11-05). Anni spietati: Torino racconta violenza e terrorismo (in Italian). Gius.Laterza & Figli Spa. ISBN 9788858117828.

=== Italian laws ===
- "Legge Basaglia (legge 13 maggio 1978, n. 180)" (in Italian).
- "Legge n. 36 del 14 febbraio 1904" (PDF) (in Italian). Archived from the original (PDF) on 2016-04-17.
