= Democratic Psychiatry =

Italian social movement

Democratic Psychiatry (Italian: Psichiatria Democratica) is an Italian association, as well as a movement for liberation of the ill and weak from segregation in mental hospitals, by pushing for the Italian psychiatric reform. The movement was political in nature but not antipsychiatric in the sense in which this term is usually used in English. Democratic Psychiatry called for radical changes in the practice and theory of psychiatry and strongly attacked the way society managed mental illness. The movement was essential in the birth of the reform Basaglia Law of 1978.

== Organizing committee ==
Democratic Psychiatry was created by a group of left-orientated psychiatrists, sociologists, and social workers under direction of Franco Basaglia, who was its figurehead. An organizing committee, which constituted in Bologna the first nucleus group called Democratic Psychiatry, consisted of Basaglia, Franca Ongaro (Basaglia's wife), Domenico Casagrande, Franco di Cecco, Tullio Fragiacomo, Vieri Marzi, Gian Franco Minguzzi, Piera Piatti, Agostino Pirella, Michele Risso, Lucio Schittar, and Antonio Slavich.

== History ==
In 1977, Democratic Psychiatry helped the Radical Party, a political organization principally concerned with the human rights defense, to collect together three-quarter of a million signatories to a petition to improve the mental health law and thus to prohibit hospitalization to psychiatric hospitals. According to Italian law this petition could have resulted in a national referendum on the issue. To avoid a referendum which could have forced the government to resign, the government passed Law 180 in May 1978 and thus initiated the dismantling of the psychiatric hospitals.

== Directive committee ==
The 2010 National Congress of Democratic Psychiatry in Rome elected the new directive committee, which consisted of national secretary Emilio Lupo, national president Luigi Attenasio, honorary president Agostino Pirella, and national treasurer Maurizio Caiazzo.

== Approach ==
Basaglia and his followers deemed that psychiatry was used as the provider of scientific support for social control to the existing establishment. The ensuing standards of deviance and normality brought about repressive views of discrete social groups. This approach was nonmedical and pointed out the role of mental hospitals in the control and medicalization of deviant behaviors and social problems. According to A. Giannelli, at least in the beginning, Democratic Psychiatry used phenomenological and existential ideas as its ideological and cultural reference point. According to P. Fusar-Poli with coauthors, Democratic Psychiatry was culturally grounded on Antonio Gramsci's theory of "revolutionary reform" and Michel Foucault's critique of the "medical model".

== Objectives ==
The objectives of the association were and still are to pool professional initiatives and energies in any part of society that are aimed at closing mental hospitals and restoring the rights of psychiatric patients.

== Programme ==
The programme of Democratic Psychiatry stated in Bologna on 8 October 1973 included the following proposals:

1. To continue to fight against exclusion, by analysing and rejecting its sources in the social structure (the social relations of production) and in the superstructures (norms and values) of our society.
2. To continue the struggle against the "asylum" as the place where exclusion finds its most obvious and violent expression, as well as the practical means of reproducing the mechanisms of social marginalization.
3. To underline the dangers of reproducing segregating institutional structures, even in the mental health services created outside the hospital.
4. To make explicit, in a practical way, the link between acting in the specific psychiatric field and the more general problem of medical care, by demanding a unified action (beyond the division of labour and skills) which in the specific struggle for the promotion of mental health involves us in the broadest possible struggle for a concrete and necessary health reform based on, and expressing, a new social logic.

== See also ==
- Basaglia Law
- Deinstitutionalisation
- Italian psychiatric reform
- Socialist Patients' Collective
- Social Therapy
