= Basaglia Law =

1978 Italian mental health act

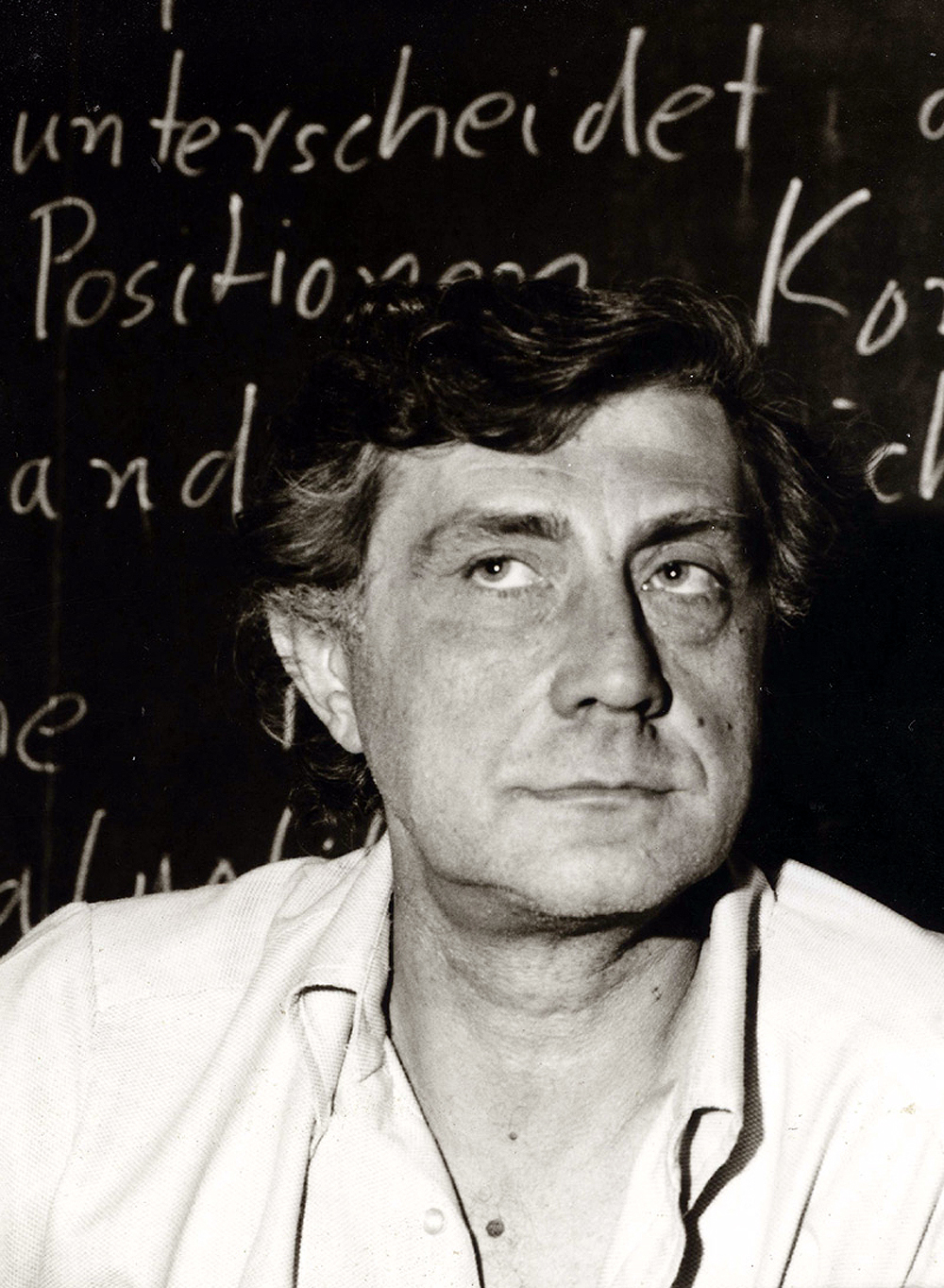
Law 180 is also known by the name of its main proponent, Franco Basaglia.

Basaglia Law or Law 180 (Italian: Legge Basaglia, Legge 180) is the Italian Mental Health Act of 1978 which signified a large reform of the psychiatric system in Italy, contained directives for the closing down of all psychiatric hospitals and led to their gradual replacement with a whole range of community-based services, including settings for acute in-patient care. The Basaglia Law is the basis of Italian mental health legislation. The principal proponent of Law 180 and its architect was Italian psychiatrist Franco Basaglia. Therefore, Law 180 is known as the “Basaglia Law” from the name of its promoter. The Parliament of Italy approved the Law 180 on 13 May 1978, and thereby initiated the gradual dismantling of psychiatric hospitals. Implementation of the psychiatric reform law was accomplished in 1998 which marked the very end of the state psychiatric hospital system in Italy. The Law has had worldwide impact as other counties took up widely the Italian model. It was Democratic Psychiatry which was essential in the birth of the reform law of 1978.

The law itself lasted until 23 December 1978. Then, its articles were incorporated, with very little changes, into a broader law (Italian: legge 23 dicembre 1978, n. 833 - Istituzione del Servizio sanitario nazionale) that introduced the National Health System.

== General objectives ==
The general objectives of Law 180/1978 included creating a decentralised community service of treating and rehabilitating mental patients and preventing mental illness and promoting comprehensive treatment, particularly through services outside a hospital network. Law 180/1978 introduced significant change in the provision of psychiatric care. The emphasis has shifted from defense of society towards better meeting of patients' wants through community care. New hospitalizations to the “old style” mental hospitals stopped instantly. The law required re-hospitalizations to cease within two years. Nobody was involuntarily discharged into the community.

== History ==
The new Italian law was created after conducting the long-term pilot experiments of deinstitutionalization in a number of cities (including Gorizia, Arezzo, Trieste, Perugia, Ferrara) between 1961 and 1978. These pilot experiments succeeded in demonstrating that it was possible to replace outdated custodial care in psychiatric hospitals with alternative community care. The demonstration consisted in showing the effectiveness of the new system of care per its ability to make a gradual and ultimate closure of psychiatric hospitals possible, while the new services, which can appropriately be called “alternative” instead of “complementary” to the psychiatric hospitals, were being created. These services include unstaffed apartments, supervised hostels, group homes, day centers, and cooperatives managed by patients.

In the early sixties, a critical factor for development of the new Law was the availability of widespread reform movements across the country led by the trade unions, the working class, university students, and radical and leftist parties. This unique social milieu led to the passing of innovative legislative bills including legislation on rights for workers, abortion, divorce and finally, Law 180.

== Main provisions ==
Law 180 was based on the following main provisions:

1. Psychiatric assistance was to be shifted away from mental hospitals to Community Mental Health Centres, newly organized in a sectorised or departmental manner to assure integrations and connections with services and community resources.
2. Hospitalization of new patients to the existing mental hospitals was not to be allowed. The construction of new mental hospitals was also prohibited.
3. Psychiatric wards were to be opened inside General Hospitals with a limited number of beds (no more than 14–16).
4. Compulsory treatments were to be exceptional interventions applied only when adequate community facilities could not be accessed and when at the same time the treatment outside of the hospital was not accepted by the patient.

== Effects of Law 180 ==
=== Dichotomy in mental health treatment ===
Since the passing of Law 180 in 1978, the Italian Mental Health Act has produced serious debate, disputing its sociopolitical implications, appraising its positive points and criticizing its negative ones. However, the international discussion has never questioned what Law 180 has done to improve the destiny of the mental ill who commit crimes. The Italian experience demonstrates how, when there are no convenient solutions, difficult issues may be sidestepped. Italian legislation has created a dichotomy in mental health treatment: to its credit it has given the law-abiding mentally ill the right to refuse treatment and has stopped all further admission of mental patients; at the same time, it allows the law-breaking mentally ill to be confined in special institutions on indeterminate sentences, thereby depriving them of all civil rights. As a consequence, the approval of Law 180 led to the closure of psychiatric hospitals in Mantova, Castiglione delle Stiviere and in Mombello.

=== Main consequences ===
The main long-term consequences of implementation of Law 180 are that:

1. Patients who were staying in mental hospitals before 1978 were gradually discharged into the community, and;
2. The availability of psychiatric beds in Italy is lower than in other comparable countries: Italy has 46 psychiatric beds for every 100, 000 population, compared with 58 in the United Kingdom and 77 in the United States of America.

== Legacy ==
American psychiatrist Loren Mosher called the Basaglia Law a revolutionary one and believed that valuable lessons might be learned from the gradualism intrinsic to the models used in developing the law, and from the national health insurance support which implemented it.

In 1993, Italian psychiatrist Bruno Norcio stated that Law 180 of 1978 was and still is an important law: that it was the first to establish that the mentally ill must be cured, not secluded; that psychiatric hospitals must cease to exist as places of seclusion; and that the mentally ill must be granted civil rights and integrated into community life.

In 2001, Stefano Carrara wrote that in Italy, the “enlightened” (as per the definition provided by Nobel laureate Rita Levi-Montalcini) Law 180/1978, more known as “Basaglia Law”, gave rise little more than twenty years ago to model of psychiatric care considered so avant-garde in the world that it was put under observation by some countries, such as France, for its export.

In 2009, P. Fusar-Poli with coauthors stated that thanks to Basaglia law, psychiatry in Italy began to be integrated into the general health services and was no longer sidelined to a peripheral area of medicine.

British clinical psychologist Richard Bentall argues that after Franco Basaglia had persuaded the Italian government to pass Law 180, which made new hospitalizations to large mental hospitals illegal, the results were controversial. In the following decade many Italian doctors complained that the prisons had become depositories for the seriously mentally ill, and that they found themselves “in a state psychiatric-therapeutic impotence when faced with the uncontrollable paranoid schizophrenic, the agitated-meddlesome maniac, or the catatonic”. These complaints were seized upon psychiatrists elsewhere, eager to exhibit the foolishness of abandoning conventional ways. However, an efficient network of smaller community mental health clinics gradually developed to replace the old system.

Giovanna Russo and Francesco Carelli state that back in 1978 the Basaglia reform perhaps could not be fully implemented because society was unprepared for such an avant-garde and innovative concept of mental health. Thirty years later, it has become more obvious that this reform reflects a concept of modern health and social care for mental patients. The Italian example originated samples of effective and innovative service models and paved the way for deinstitutionalisation of mental patients.

According to Corrado Barbui and Michele Tansella, after 30 years of implementation, Law 180 remains unique in mental health law around the world, as Italy is the only country where traditional psychiatric hospitals are outside the law.

== See also ==
- Democratic Psychiatry
- Deinstitutionalisation
- Psychiatric reform in Italy
- Giorgio Coda
- Giorgio Antonucci
- Mombello Psychiatric Hospital
