= Epidemiology and Psychiatric Sciences =

- Discipline: Psychiatry, epidemiology
- Language: English
- Edited by: Corrado Barbui

Publication details
- Former name: Epidemiologia e Psichiatria Sociale
- History: 1992-present
- Publisher: Cambridge University Press
- Frequency: Continuous
- Impact factor: 6.1 (2024)

Standard abbreviations
- ISO 4: Epidemiol. Psychiatr. Sci.

Indexing
- ISSN: 2045-7960 (print); 2045-7979 (web)
- LCCN: 2011243374
- OCLC no.: 727338545

Links
- Journal homepage; Online access; Online archive

Epidemiology and Psychiatric Sciences is a quarterly peer-reviewed scientific journal covering psychiatry and epidemiology. It was established in 1992 as Epidemiologia e Psichiatria Sociale, obtaining its current name in 2011. The founding editor-in-chief was Michele Tansella, and the current one is Brian J. Hall, PhD (NYU Shanghai). According to the Journal Citation Reports, the journal has a 2022 impact factor of 8.1, ranking it 11th out of 144 journals in the category "Psychiatry" on the Social Sciences Citation Index (SSCI) edition and 16th out of 155 journals on the Science Citation Index Expanded (SCIE) edition.
