= Psychiatric reform in Italy =

Psychiatric reform in Italy is the reform of psychiatry which started in Italy after the passing of Basaglia Law in 1978 and terminated with the very end of the Italian state mental hospital system in 1998. Among European countries, Italy was the first to publicly declare its repugnance for a mental health care system which led to social exclusion and segregation. The psychiatric reform was also a consequence of a public debate sparked by Giorgio Coda's case and stories collected and analyzed in Alberto Papuzzi's book Portami su quello che canta.

== Aims ==
The reform was directed towards the gradual dismantling of the psychiatric hospitals and required a comprehensive, integrated and responsible community mental health service. The object of community care is to reverse the long-accepted practice of isolating the mental ill in large institutions, to promote their integration in the community offering them a milieu which is socially stimulating, while avoiding subjecting them to too intense social pressures.

== Trieste model ==
Since the late 1960s, the Italian physician Giorgio Antonucci questioned the basis itself of psychiatry. After working with Edelweiss Cotti in 1968 at the Centro di Relazioni Umane in Cividale del Friuli – an open ward created as an alternative to the psychiatric hospital – from 1973 to 1996 Antonucci worked on the dismantling of the psychiatric hospitals Osservanza and Luigi Lolli of Imola, and the liberation – and restitution to life – of the people there secluded. In August, 1971, Franco Basaglia became the director of the provincial psychiatric hospital located in Trieste. With a group of young physicians not yet influenced by traditional psychiatry —as well as psychologists, volunteers and students— Basaglia started an intense project for the theoretical-practical criticism of the institution of the asylum. At that time, there were approximately 1,200 patients in the San Giovanni psychiatric hospital, most of them were under compulsory treatment. From 1971 to 1974, the efforts of Franco Basaglia and his equipe were directed at changing the rules and logic which governed the institution, putting the hierarchy in question, changing the relations between patients and operators, inventing new relations, opportunities and spaces, and restoring freedom and rights to the inmates.

In the hospital being transformed, guardianship was substituted by care, institutional abandonment by the full assumption of responsibility for the patient and their condition, while the negation of the individual through the concept of illness-danger was replaced by the conferring of importance and value to individual life histories. Any form of physical containment and shock therapy was suppressed, the barriers and mesh which had enclosed the wards were removed, doors and gates were opened, compulsory hospitalizations became voluntary and definitive ones were revoked, thus the patients regained their political and civil rights.

== Main characteristics ==
Michele Tansella specified the main characteristics of the Italian experience:

- community care as the principal component of the system;
- a relatively low dose of inpatient care, avoiding treating any new patients in mental hospital;
- a very careful integration between the various facilities within the geographically based system of care, the same team providing outpatient as well as inpatient and community care.

The closure of various hospital settings became possible because of constant reduction of in-patients number which in the course of years had the following dynamics:

1968: 4.633	1972: 3.385	1976: 2.684
1969: 4.508	1973: 3.037	1977: 2.492
1970: 4.054	1974: 2.937	1978: 2.176
1971: 3.634	1975: 2.834	1979: 1.710

== Estimations ==
Giovanna Russo and Francesco Carelli state that back in 1978 the Basaglia reform perhaps could not be fully implemented because society was unprepared for such an avant-garde and innovative concept of mental health. Thirty years later, it has become more obvious that this reform reflects a concept of modern health and social care for mental patients. The Italian example originated samples of effective and innovative service models and paved the way for deinstitutionalisation of mental patients.

== See also ==
- Basaglia Law
- Deinstitutionalisation
- Giorgio Antonucci
- Giorgio Coda
