= Franco Basaglia =

Italian psychiatrist (1924–1980)

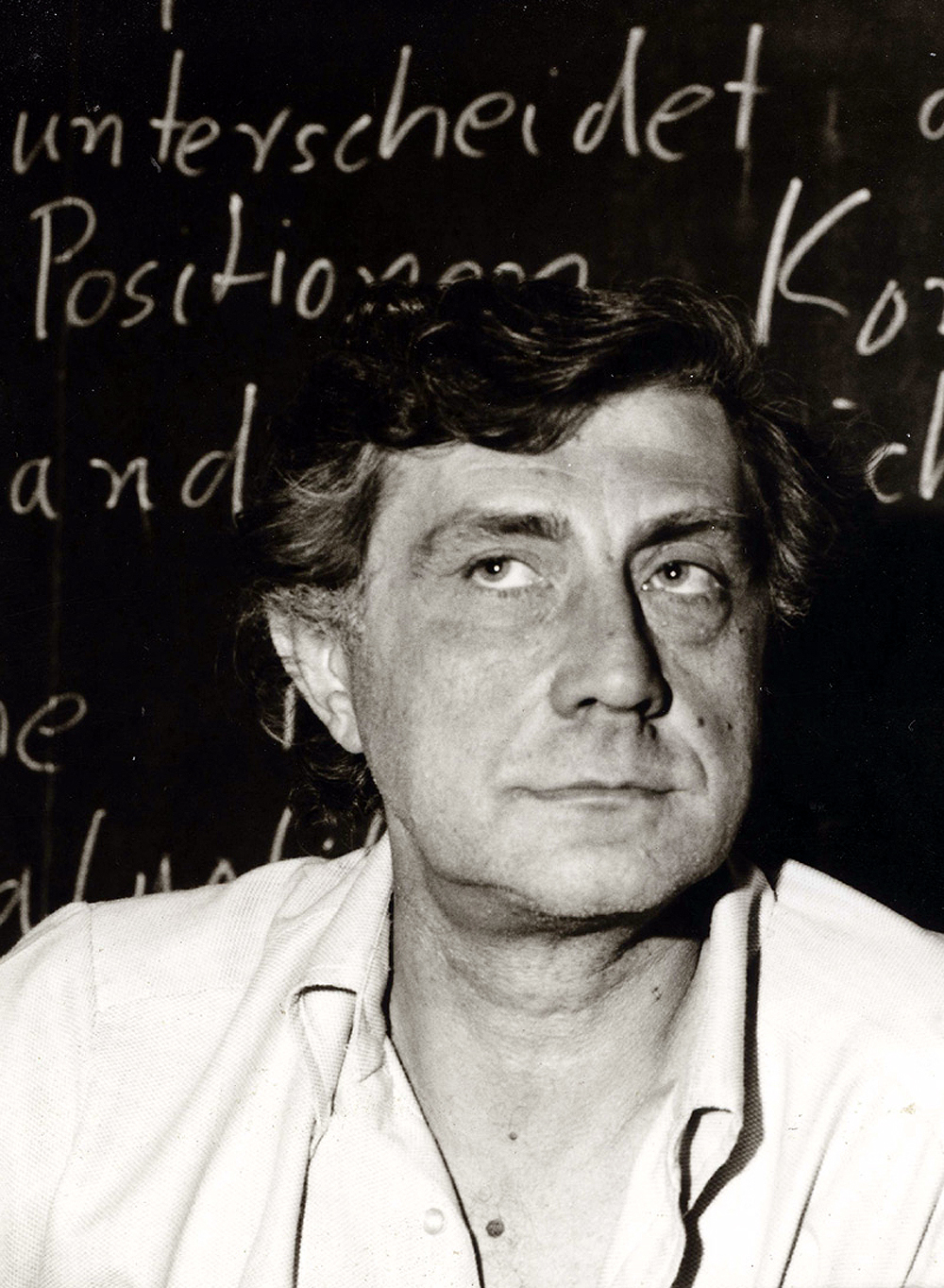
- Born: 11 March 1924; San Polo, Venice, Italy
- Died: 29 August 1980 (aged 56); San Polo, Venice, Italy
- Education: University of Padua
- Known for: Creating Democratic Psychiatry and Basaglia Law, initiating Italian psychiatric reform
- Scientific career
- Fields: Psychiatry
- Workplaces: University of Padua, University of Parma, mental hospitals in Padua, Gorizia, Parma, Trieste, Arezzo, mental service in Lazio

Franco Basaglia (Italian: [ˈfraŋko baˈzaʎʎa]; 11 March 1924 – 29 August 1980) was an Italian psychiatrist, neurologist, professor, and disability advocate who was the principal proponent of Law 180, which abolished mental hospitals in Italy. The founder of the journal Democratic Psychiatry, he is considered the most influential Italian psychiatrist of the 20th century.

== Biography ==
Franco Basaglia was born on 11 March 1924 in Venice. After obtaining a medical degree from University of Padova in 1949, he trained in the local school of psychiatry, where he acquainted himself with the philosophy of Karl Jaspers, Ludwig Binswanger and Eugène Minkowski, studied phenomenologists such as Edmund Husserl, Martin Heidegger, Maurice Merleau-Ponty, and Jean-Paul Sartre, and analyzed the work of sociological and historical critics of psychiatric institutions such as Erving Goffman and Michel Foucault.

He died in Venice in 1980.

== Views ==
Basaglia began working at a mental hospital in Gorizia in the early 1960s. When he arrived at Gorizia, he was revolted by what he observed as the conventional regime of institutional 'care': locked doors only partly successful in muffling the weeping and screams of the patients, many of them lying nude and powerless in their excrement. Basaglia observed the institutional response to human suffering: physical abuse, straitjackets, ice packs, bed ties, ECT and insulin-coma shock therapies to 'quiet' the melancholy and the terrified, and to strike terror in the agitated and the difficult.

Basaglia noticed that many of the characteristics of his patients which were believed to be inherent in their mental illness, such as vacant stares and repetitive gestures and movements, appeared to dissolve as the patients left the confines of the asylum. He concluded from this that society would not know what mental illnesses were, or what limitations ought to be put on persons with them, until both staff and patients were freed from the beliefs, attitudes and culture of the asylum. Basaglia insisted that much of what was traditionally understood as "madness" was actually the consequences of institutional conditions, not a real danger which the walls of a mental hospital needed to contain. He considered the psychiatric hospital an oppressive, locked and total institution in which prison-like, punitive rules are applied in order to gradually eliminate its inmates; patients, doctors and nurses are all subjected (at different levels) to the same process of institutionalisation.

Basaglia and his followers believed that psychiatry was a tool used by the establishment to provide scientific support for social control. The ensuing standards of deviance and normality brought about repressive views of discrete social groups. Basaglia was concerned that, without the complete closing of asylums, mental health professionals would unknowingly reconstitute asylum culture in community facilities. As long as confinement remained possible, professionals would continue to regard themselves as the ultimately responsible parties, and patients would continue to regard their agency and freedom as dependent on the doctor's will.

In 1961, Basaglia started refusing to bind patients to their beds and abolished isolation. His actions sparked a wide theoretical and practical debate in Italy, which resulted in the passage in 1978 of the Basaglia Law, also known as Law 180, which provided for the gradual but final closure and dismantling of the country's mental hospitals.

== Works ==
Basaglia's first substantial report was titled The Destruction of the Mental Hospital as a Place of Institutionalisation and was presented by him at the First International Congress of Social Psychiatry in London in 1964. In this report Basaglia stated that "the psychiatrist of today seems to have discovered, suddenly, that the first step towards the cure of the patient is his return to liberty of which, until now, the psychiatrist himself had deprived him" and that "it is true that the discovery of liberty is the most obvious that Psychiatry could reach." In conclusion, Basaglia tried to fix some points in an attempt to form a lever for discovering liberty:

1. Pressure on the administration on which the hospital depends, by the involved action of joint responsibility for the situation previously maintained.
2. The awakening of conscience and of joint responsibility on the part of the doctors who have accepted and preserved this situation.
3. The introduction of drugs by means of which, notwithstanding the institutionalised climate, the breaking of the "bond" of the patients was made possible.
4. The attempt at re-education—theoretical and humane—of the nurses. (This, however, is still far from having been reached.)
5. The keeping alive—as far as possible—of the ties of the patient with the world outside (family, friends, interests).
6. The opening of the doors, and the beginning of life according to the open door system.
7. The creation of presuppositions of the Day Hospital, soon to be opened, as a part-time service.

In 1968, L'istituzione negata ('The Institution Denied'), edited by Basaglia, was published. Widely read all over Italy, this book not only documented and analyzed the changes at Gorizia but also carried anti-institutional debate into other areas: factories, universities and schools.

== Legacy ==
While discussing the process of transformation of mental health care across the European Region, Matt Muijen argues that the influence of professionals has obviously been decisive, mostly psychiatrists who acted as advocates of change, such as Philippe Pinel in France in the 19th century and Franco Basaglia in Italy in the 20th. They offered conceptions of new models of effective and humane care, revolutionary for their times, replacing abusive and inadequate traditional services. Their real accomplishment was the ability to inspire politicians to advocate these conceptions and persuade colleagues to implement them, thereby enabling sustainable and real change.

Giovanna Russo and Francesco Carelli state that back in 1978 the Basaglia reform perhaps could not be fully implemented because society was unprepared for such an avant-garde and innovative concept of mental health. Thirty years later, it has become more obvious that this reform reflects a concept of modern health and social care for mental patients. The Italian example originated samples of effective and innovative service models and paved the way for deinstitutionalisation of mental patients.

Giovanni de Girolamo with coauthors argues that Basaglia's contribution was crucial to move psychiatric practice into the realm of health care and give visibility to psychiatry.

P. Fusar-Poli with coauthors argues that thanks to the Basaglia law, psychiatry in Italy began to be integrated into the general health services and was no longer sidelined to a peripheral area of medicine.

In the 2001 National Mental Health Conference, Italian neurologist and laureate of the 1986 Nobel Prize in Physiology or Medicine Rita Levi-Montalcini expressed her admiration for Franco Basaglia by calling him the founder of the new conception of mental illness, a magnificent scientist and fine human being who really lived the tragic problem of mental illness.

British clinical psychologist Richard Bentall argues that after Franco Basaglia had persuaded the Italian government to pass Law 180, which made new hospitalizations to large mental hospitals illegal, the results were controversial. In the following decade many Italian doctors complained that the prisons had become depositories for the seriously mentally ill, and that they found themselves "in a state psychiatric-therapeutic impotence when faced with the uncontrollable paranoid schizophrenic, the agitated-meddlesome maniac, or the catatonic". These complaints were seized upon psychiatrists elsewhere, eager to exhibit the foolishness of abandoning conventional ways. However, an efficient network of smaller community mental health clinics gradually developed to replace the old system.

The president of the World Phenomenology Institute Anna-Teresa Tymieniecka states that Basaglia managed to pull together substantial revolutionary and reformatory energies around his anti-institutional project and created the conditions which within a few years brought to the reform of mental health legislation in 1978. This reform was introduced amongst great enthusiasm and bitter criticism, hostility and perplexity, critical and sometimes unconditional support. Basaglia thereby managed to inflict a salutary shock on Italian psychiatry, which had previously been torpid.

American psychiatrist Loren Mosher called Basaglia the most innovative and influential European psychiatrist since Freud.

Francine Saillant and Serge Genest assert that Basaglia's reform of psychiatry in Italy, a renewed vision of Italian society, and radical critique of public institutions made him one of Italy's greatest, most progressive intellectuals and a leading figure of the second half of the 20th century.

Thomas Szasz had a radically critical opinion about the work of Basaglia. In 1986, in the preface to the book by Giorgio Antonucci 'I pregiudizi e la conoscenza critica alla psichiatria', Szasz writes the following words about the misunderstanding of the ideas of Basaglia:

Basaglia became famous for having abolished the psychiatric hospitals in Italy, statement as absurd as saying that mental diseases are diseases like all the others'. 'Basaglia, [...] never ceased to practice genuine psychiatry, fact that basically meant to reinforce, rather than to weaken, the legitimacy of the psychiatric interventions against the will of the affected persons, having transferred the place in which the commitment occurs from the psychiatric hospital to the civil hospital.

== See also ==
- Basaglia Law
- Giorgio Coda
- Giorgio Antonucci
- Democratic Psychiatry
- Psychiatric reform in Italy
- Deinstitutionalisation
- Anti-psychiatry

== Selected bibliography ==
=== Research papers ===
- Basaglia F. (June 1952). "Esposizione di alcuni casi di utile impiego del Test del disegno nei disturbi del linguaggio" [Various cases of useful application of the drawing test in speech disorders]. Rivista Sperimentale di Freniatria e Medicina Legale delle Alienazioni Mentali (in Italian). 76 (2): 300–305. PMID 12994675.
- Basaglia F. (1953). "Il mondo dell'"incomprensibile" schizofrenico attraverso la "Daseinsanalyse". Presentazione di un caso clinico" [The world of the schizophrenic incomprehensible through Daseinsanalyse; presentation of a case]. Giornale di Psichiatrie e di Neuropatologia (in Italian). 81 (3): 471–499. PMID 13128418.
- Basaglia F. (1953). "Sull'impiego del Test di associazione verbale secondo Rapaport in clinica psichiatrica" [Use of Rapaport word association test in clinical psychiatry]. Giornale di Psichiatrie e di Neuropatologia (in Italian). 81 (4): 725–737. PMID 13142364.
- Basaglia F. (May 1954). "Contributo allo studio psicopatologico e clinico degli stati ossessivi" [Psychopathology and clinical aspects of obsessive states]. Rassegna di Studi Psichiatrici (in Italian). 43 (2): 269–310. PMID 13186170.
- Basaglia F. (June 1954). "Su alcuni aspetti della moderna psicoterapia: analisi fenomenologica dell'"incontro"" [Various aspects of modern psychotherapy: phenomenological analysis of "contact"]. Rivista Sperimentale di Freniatria e Medicina Legale delle Alienazioni Mentali (in Italian). 78 (2): 239–264. PMID 13225524.
- Basaglia F.; Dalla Barba G. (June 1954). "A proposito della risposto "maschera" nel Test di Rorschach" [The masked response in the Rorschach test]. Rivista Sperimentale di Freniatria e Medicina Legale delle Alienazioni Mentali (in Italian). 78 (2): 433–436. PMID 13225535.
- Basaglia F. (1955). "In tema di "pensiero dereistico". Considerazioni sul concetto di "distacco dalla realtà"" [Dereistic thinking; study of the concept of detachment from reality]. Archivio di Psicologia, Neurologia e Psichiatria (in Italian). 16 (1): 87–108. PMID 14362874.
- Basaglia F. (1955). "Sull'impiego del Plexonal (Sandoz) nel trattamento sedativo e nella narcoterapia" [Use of plexonal (Sandoz) in sedative therapy and narcotherapy]. Giornale di Psichiatrie e di Neuropatologia (in Italian). 83 (3): 671–672. PMID 13305896.
- Basaglia F.; Pessina G. (March–April 1956). "La "reazione immagine" del psiconevrotico ossessivo al Test di associazione verbale" [Image reaction of the obsessive psychoneurotic to the word association test]. Rassegna di Studi Psichiatrici (in Italian). 45 (2): 344–359. PMID 13350592.
- Basaglia F.; Pessina G. (1956). "Il Test di associazione verbale e il Test Wechsler Bellevue in un gruppo di soggetti a sintomatologia isterica" [Word association test and Wechsler-Bellevue scale in a group of subjects with hysterical symptoms]. Rassegna di Studi Psichiatrici (in Italian). 45 (3): 475–498. PMID 13359749.
- Basaglia F. (June 1956). "Il corpo nell'ipocondria e nella depersonalizzazione. La struttura psicopatologica dell'ipocondria" [Body in hypochondria and in depersonalization; psychopathological structure of hypochondria]. Rivista Sperimentale di Freniatria e Medicina Legale delle Alienazioni Mentali (in Italian). 80 (1–2): 159–185. PMID 13351471.
- Basaglia F. (August 1956). "Il corpo nell'ipocondria e nella depersonalizzazione. La coscienza del corpo e il sentimento di esistenza corporea nella depersonalizzazione somatopsichica" [The body in hypochondria and in depersonalization; consciousness of the body and the sensation of corporal existence in somatopsychic depersonalization]. Rivista Sperimentale di Freniatria e Medicina Legale delle Alienazioni Mentali (in Italian). 80 (3): 453–490. PMID 13360063.
- Basaglia F. (September 1957). "L'azione della cloropromazina sull'esperienza delirante primaria" [The effects of chlorpromazine on a state of primary delirium]. Rivista Sperimentale di Freniatria e Medicina Legale delle Alienazioni Mentali (in Italian). 81 (3): 787–798. PMID 13506504.
- Basaglia F. (July 1957). "Delirio di negazione e ossessione della negazione" [Delirium & obsession of negation]. Rivista Sperimentale di Freniatria e Medicina Legale delle Alienazioni Mentali (in Italian). 81 (2): 506–510. PMID 13466972.
- Basaglia F. (July 1957). "A proposito del "dreamy state" e della depersonalizzazione nevrotica. Comunicazione al XII Congresso nazionale della Società italiana di neurologia" [Dreamy state & neurotic depresonalization; case report]. Rivista Sperimentale di Freniatria e Medicina Legale delle Alienazioni Mentali (in Italian). 81 (2): 371–378. PMID 13466958.
- Basaglia F. (1957). "Il sentimento di estraneità nella malinconia. Contributo psicopatologico e clinico" [Depersonalization in melancholia; psychopathological & clinical aspects]. Giornale di Psichiatrie e di Neuropatologia (in Italian). 85 (3): 627–645. PMID 13480553.
- Basaglia F.; Dalla Barba G. (1957). "La "sindrome organica di Rorschach" in un gruppo di parkinsoniani postencefalitici" [Rorschach organic syndrome in a group of postencephalitic parkinsonism patients]. Rassegna di Studi Psichiatrici (in Italian). 46 (2): 225–230. PMID 13441961.
- Basaglia F.; Dalla Barba G. (1957). "A proposito della "sindrome paranoide nella concezione antropologica"" [A paranoid syndrome of anthropological concept]. Giornale di Psichiatrie e di Neuropatologia (in Italian). 85 (3): 677–680. PMID 13480557.
- Basaglia F.; Dalla Barba G. (1957). "Su alcuni aspetti del protocollo schizofrenico" [Various aspects of the schizophrenic protocol]. Giornale di Psichiatrie e di Neuropatologia (in Italian). 85 (3): 671–675. PMID 13480556.
- Basaglia F.; Dalla Barba G. (1957). "Il significato delle risposte chiaroscuro" [Significance of light-dark responses]. Giornale di Psichiatrie e di Neuropatologia (in Italian). 85 (2): 391–399. PMID 13462245.
- Basaglia F.; Dalla Barba G. (January–February 1957). "Il rifiuto alla V tavola di Rorschach" [Refusal of the Rorschach table V]. Archivio di Psicologia, Neurologia e Psichiatria (in Italian). 18 (1): 17–24. PMID 13436182.
- Basaglia F.; Dalla Barba G. (September 1957). "Dolore psicotico ed ansia nevrotica nel protocollo Rorschach del depresso" [Psychotic pain & neurotic anxiety in the Rorschach score of the depressed]. Rivista Sperimentale di Freniatria e Medicina Legale delle Alienazioni Mentali (in Italian). 81 (3): 640–653. PMID 13506499.
- Basaglia F.; Dalla Barba G. (September 1957). "A proposito dell'"esaltazione" come modalità schizofrenica" [Exaltation as a form of schizophrenia]. Rivista Sperimentale di Freniatria e Medicina Legale delle Alienazioni Mentali (in Italian). 81 (3): 565–580. PMID 13506495.
- Basaglia F.; Fontanari D. (October 1960). "Il ruolo del sistema nervoso vegetativo nelle sindromi neuropsichiatriche menopausali" [The role of the vegetative nervous system in menopausal neuropsychiatric syndromes]. Rassegna di Neurologia Vegetativa (in Italian). 15: 131–151. PMID 13865560.
- Basaglia F. (1964). "Il silenzio nel dialogo con lo psicotico" [Silence in the dialog with the psychotic patient]. Giornale di Psichiatrie e di Neuropatologia (in Italian). 92: 787–793. PMID 14304149.
- Basaglia F. (June 1964). "Ansia e malafede. La condizione umana del nevrotico" [Anxiety and insincerity: The human condition of the neurotic]. Rivista Sperimentale di Freniatria e Medicina Legale delle Alienazioni Mentali (in Italian). 88: 392–404. PMID 14174407.
- Basaglia F. (1965). "Corps, regard et silence. L'énigme de la subjectivité en psychiatrie" [Body, look and silence. The enigma of subjectivity in psychiatry]. L'Evolution Psychiatrique (Paris) (in French). 30: 11–26. PMID 14312492.
- Basaglia F. (1965). "Silence in the dialogue with the psychotic". Journal of Existentialism. 6 (21): 99–102. PMID 5840813.
- Basaglia F.; Slavich A. (1966). "A proposito delle dinamiche di gruppo in una comunità terapeutica. Il ruolo degli alcoolisti" [Apropos of group dynamics in a "therapeutic community". The role of alcoholics]. Giornale di Psichiatrie e di Neuropatologia (in Italian). 94 (1): 93–106. PMID 5947389.
- Basaglia F.; Basaglia Ongaro F. (December 1966). "Un problema di psichiatria istituzionale. L'esclusione come categoria socio-psichiatrica" [A problem of institutional psychiatry. Exclusion as a socio-psychiatric category]. Rivista Sperimentale di Freniatria e Medicina Legale delle Alienazioni Mentali (in Italian). 90 (6): 1484–1503. PMID 5999615.
- Basaglia F. (May 1969). "Appunti di psichiatria istituzionale" [Institutional psychiatry]. Recenti Progressi in Medicine (in Italian). 46 (5): 486–506. PMID 5409229.
- Basaglia F. (1980). "Problems of law and psychiatry: the Italian experience". International Journal of Law and Psychiatry. 3 (1): 17–37. doi:10.1016/0160-2527(80)90017-5. PMID 7409955.
- Basaglia F. (November 1980). "Crisis intervention, treatment and rehabilitation". World Hospitals. 16 (4): 26–27. PMID 10249500.

=== Books and reports ===
- (in Italian) Che cos'è la psichiatria?, 1967, Einaudi (some passages) and translated into French as Qu'est-ce que la psychiatrie?, by Franco Basaglia, PUF, 1980. Translator: Robert Maggiori.
- (in Italian) L'istituzione negata, Turin, 1968, Einaudi (last edition: Basaglia, Franco; et al. (2010). L'istituzione negata. Rapporto da un ospedale psichiatrico. Baldini Castoldi Dalai. ISBN 978-88-6073-732-8.)
- (in Italian) Morire di classe, Turin, 1969, Einaudi (book of photographs by Carla Cerati and Gianni Berengo Gardin).
- (in Italian) Il malato artificiale, Turin, 1969, Einaudi
- (in Italian) La maggioranza deviante (with Franca Ongaro), Turin, 1971, Einaudi
- (in Italian) Basaglia, Franco (1971). "Noi Matti: Dizionario sociale della psichiatria". mrtno.com.
- (in Italian) Crimini di pace, (with Foucault, Goffman, Laing, Chomsky).
- (in Italian) Conferenze brasiliane, Raffaello Cortina
- (in Italian) Corso di aggiornamento per operatori psichiatrici, 1979
- (in Italian) La chiusura dell'ospedale psichiatrico, 1976
- (in Italian) Le contraddizioni della comunità terapeutica, 1970
- (in Italian) La distruzione dell'ospedale psichiatrico come luogo di istituzionalizzazione, 1964
- (in Italian) Scritti, vol. 1: 1953-1968: Dalla psichiatria fenomenologica all'esperienza di Gorizia, Einaudi, Turin, 1981
- (in Italian) Scritti vol. 2: 1968-1980. Dall'apertura del manicomio alla nuova legge sull'Assistenza psichiatrica, Einaudi, Torino
- (in Italian) La violenza (scritto con Franco Fornari), Vallecchi, Flowrence, 1978
- (in Italian) L'utopia della realtà Turin, Einaudi.

== Films on Franco Basaglia ==
- I giardini di Abele, by Sergio Zavoli, 1968, on RaiPlay.
- C'era una volta la città dei matti... (English: There was once the city of the mad...) directed by Silvano Agosti, 2000, Istituto Luce.
- La seconda ombra (English: The second shadow) directed by Marco Turco, producer Rai Fiction and Ciao Ragazzi!, 2010
- I grandi della Scienza del Novecento: Franco Basaglia (The Great of the 20th Century Science: Franco Basaglia), part 1 (documentary in English) on YouTube
- I grandi della Scienza del Novecento: Franco Basaglia (The Great of the 20th Century Science: Franco Basaglia), part 2 (documentary in English) on YouTube
- I grandi della Scienza del Novecento: Franco Basaglia (The Great of the 20th Century Science: Franco Basaglia), part 3 (documentary in English) on YouTube
- Giorgio Antonucci speaks about Franco Basaglia on YouTube
