= John Foot (historian) =

English historian (born 1964)

John Mackintosh Foot (born 8 November 1964) is an English academic historian specialising in Italy.

== Early life and education ==
The son of the journalist Paul Foot and his first wife, Monica (née Beckinsale), he was born in London in 1964. Foot graduated from Oxford University with a degree in philosophy, politics and economics in 1986 and, in 1991, gained his doctorate from Cambridge University, submitting a thesis on the socialist movements in Milan between 1914 and 1921.

== Career ==
From 1989 until 1995, Foot was an associate lecturer at Cambridge University, organising seminars on Italian and French history during the 20th century. From 1992 to 1995, he held a Junior Research Fellowship at Churchill College, Cambridge, and he held a series of lectures at several Italian universities (Politecnico di Milano, Politecnico di Torino, D'Annunzio University of Chieti–Pescara, IULM and Interaction Design Institute Ivrea), on the themes of postwar migration movements and urban developments of the Italian cities, especially with respect to Milan. Later, he taught subjects related to the history and politics of Europe, with an emphasis on Italy, at several British universities, including Reading (1994), Keele (1995–96) and Strathclyde (1996). From 1996 to 2000, he worked in the Italian Department of University College of London (UCL), where he became a professor of Italian history until 2004. In 2013, he moved to the University of Bristol to take up the chair in Modern Italian History. He is currently director of the South West and Wales Doctoral Training Partnership.

From 1994 to 1997, Foot was secretary of the Association for the Study of Modern Italy and was a member of its executive committee until 1999. In 1999, he was awarded the Dyos Prize in Urban History by the University of Cambridge. From 2010 to 2014, he was a co-editor, with Professor Phil Cooke, of the journal Modern Italy. In 2006, he was part of the jury The City of Cities, organised by the Province of Milan, and in 2007 he was part of the jury for the D. H. Lawrence Prize for Travel Writing, organised by the Province of Cagliari.

Foot has written a history of Italian football, Calcio, published in 2006 (a 2007 edition included details of Italy's 2006 World Cup victory and the calciopoli scandal). The book was published in the US with the title Winning at all Costs. It has also been published in Italy, with a later Italian edition updating the story to 2011. In 2006, this book came second in the prestigious Premio Bancarella Sport book prize. His interest in the cultural history of Italian sport was continued with his well-reviewed history of Italian cycling, Pedalare, which appeared in both Italian and English. In addition, he has written a history textbook, Modern Italy, which was updated with a second edition in 2014. In 2009, he published the study Italy's Divided Memory, which appeared in a longer Italian version as Fratture d'Italia.

In 2014, Foot brought out the first critical history of the radical psychiatric reform in Italy – led by Franco Basaglia – which closed down the psychiatric hospitals there. The book appeared in an English edition published by Verso Books in 2015 with the title The Man who Closed the Asylums. This edition received reviews in Nature, The Guardian, The Times Literary Supplement, the Financial Times and elsewhere. He was invited to festivals in Mantua and Pordenone in 2014 and 2015 to discuss the book.

Foot has written for The Guardian, The Times Literary Supplement, the London Review of Books and other publications. He has published numerous academic articles, works as a reviewer and peer reviewer for grant-making bodies, journals and publishers, and has appeared on BBC Radio 4, BBC Radio 5 Live, BBC Radio 3 and on overseas media outlets. He also writes for the Italian magazine Internazionale. He has had regular slots on Milan's Radio Popolare radio station and was for a time based in Milan. In 2015, there was a new edition – with a new preface – of Milano dopo il miracolo, the Italian edition of his 2001 book Milan Since the Miracle. He also directed a documentary film, Story of a House: Piazzale Lugano, 22 (2003), which was selected for the film-maker film festival at the Milan Film Festival and has been screened in Italy and the UK.

== Personal life ==
He lives in Bristol with his partner, Sarah, and his daughter, Corinna. His son Lorenzo, from a previous relationship, lives in Milan. He is a supporter of Arsenal, Plymouth Argyle and Inter Milan. He also backs the West Indies and Middlesex in cricket.

== Bibliography ==
=== Selected books ===
- Milan Since the Miracle: City, Culture and Identity, Oxford: Berg, 2001 ISBN 978-1-85973-550-3
- Modern Italy, Palgrave Macmillan, 2003 ISBN 978-0333669051
- Italian cityscapes: culture and urban change in contemporary Italy (edited with Robert Lumley), Exeter: University of Exeter Press, 2004 ISBN 9780859897365
- Pedalare! Pedalare!, Bloomsbury, 2006 ISBN 978-1408822197
- Calcio: A History of Italian Football, Harper Perennial, 2007 ISBN 978-0007175758 (aka, Winning at All Costs: A Scandalous History of Italian Soccer, Nation Books, 2007 ISBN 978-1568583686)
- Italy's Divided Memory, Palgrave Mavmillan, 2011 ISBN 978-0230120495
- The Archipelago: Italy Since 1945, Bloomsbury, 2018 ISBN 978-1408827246
- Blood and Power: The Rise and Fall of Italian Fascism, Bloomsbury, 2022 ISBN 9781408897935
- The Red Brigades: The Terrorists Who Brought Italy to its Knees, Bloomsbury, 2025 ISBN 9781526645715
