= Deinstitutionalisation =

Replacement of psychiatric hospitals

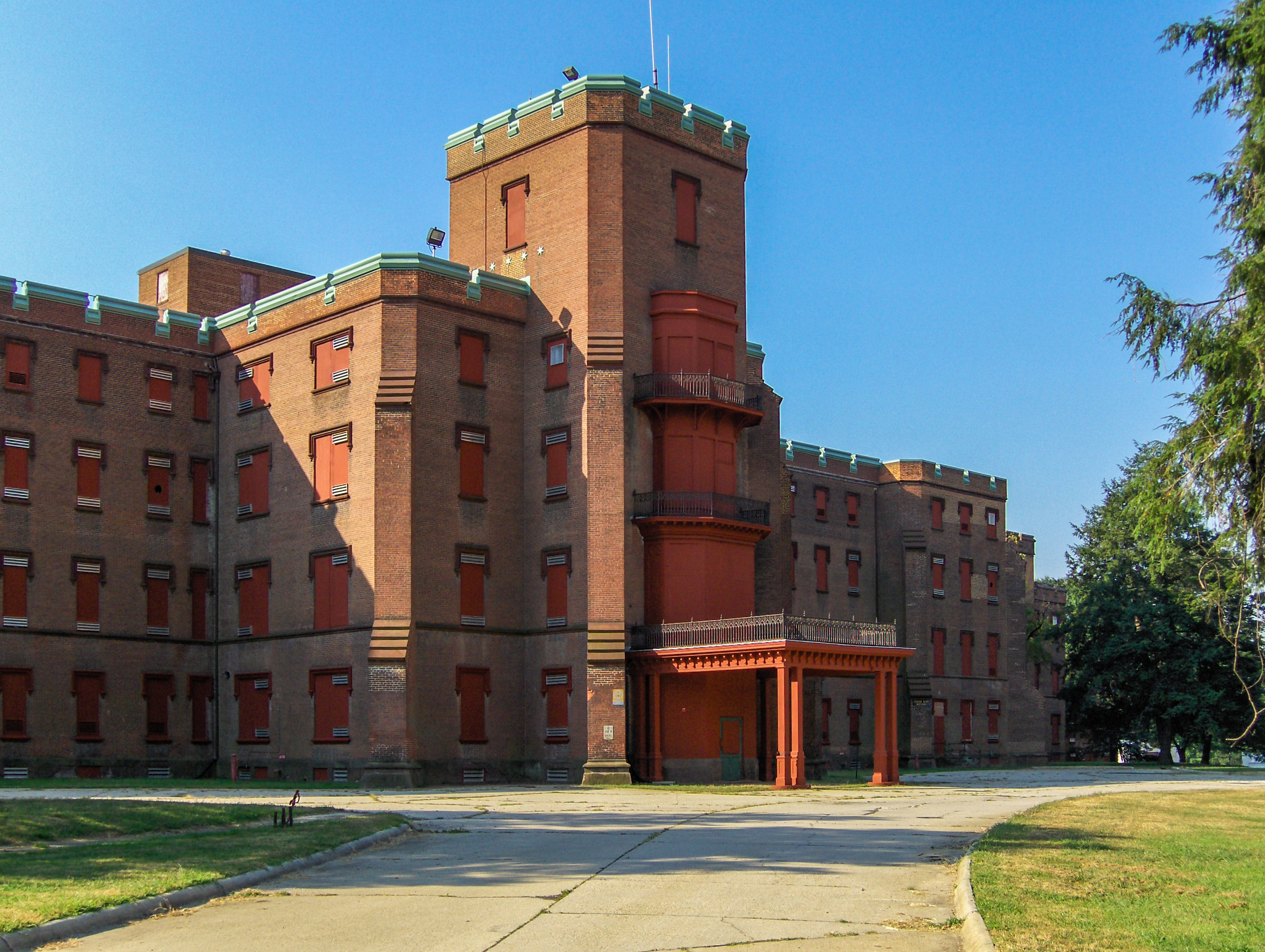
The former St Elizabeth's Hospital in 2006, closed and boarded up. Located in Washington D.C., the hospital had been one of the sites of the Rosenhan experiment in the 1970s.

Deinstitutionalisation (or deinstitutionalization) is the process of replacing long-stay psychiatric hospitals with less isolated community mental health services for those diagnosed with a mental disorder or developmental disability. In the 1950s and 1960s, it led to the closure of many psychiatric hospitals, as patients were increasingly cared for at home, in halfway houses, group homes, and clinics, in regular hospitals, or not at all.

Deinstitutionalisation works in two ways. The first focuses on reducing the population size of mental institutions by releasing patients, shortening stays, and reducing both admissions and readmission rates. The second focuses on reforming psychiatric care to reduce (or avoid encouraging) feelings of dependency, hopelessness and other behaviours that make it hard for patients to adjust to a life outside of care.

The modern deinstitutionalisation movement was made possible by the discovery of psychiatric drugs in the mid-20th century, which could manage psychotic episodes and reduced the need for patients to be confined and restrained. Another major impetus was a series of socio-political movements that campaigned for patient freedom. Lastly, there were financial imperatives, with many governments also viewing it as a way to save costs.

The movement to reduce institutionalisation was met with wide acceptance in Western countries, though its effects have been the subject of many debates. Critics of the policy include defenders of the previous policies as well as those who believe the reforms did not go far enough to provide freedom to patients.

== History ==
=== 19th century ===
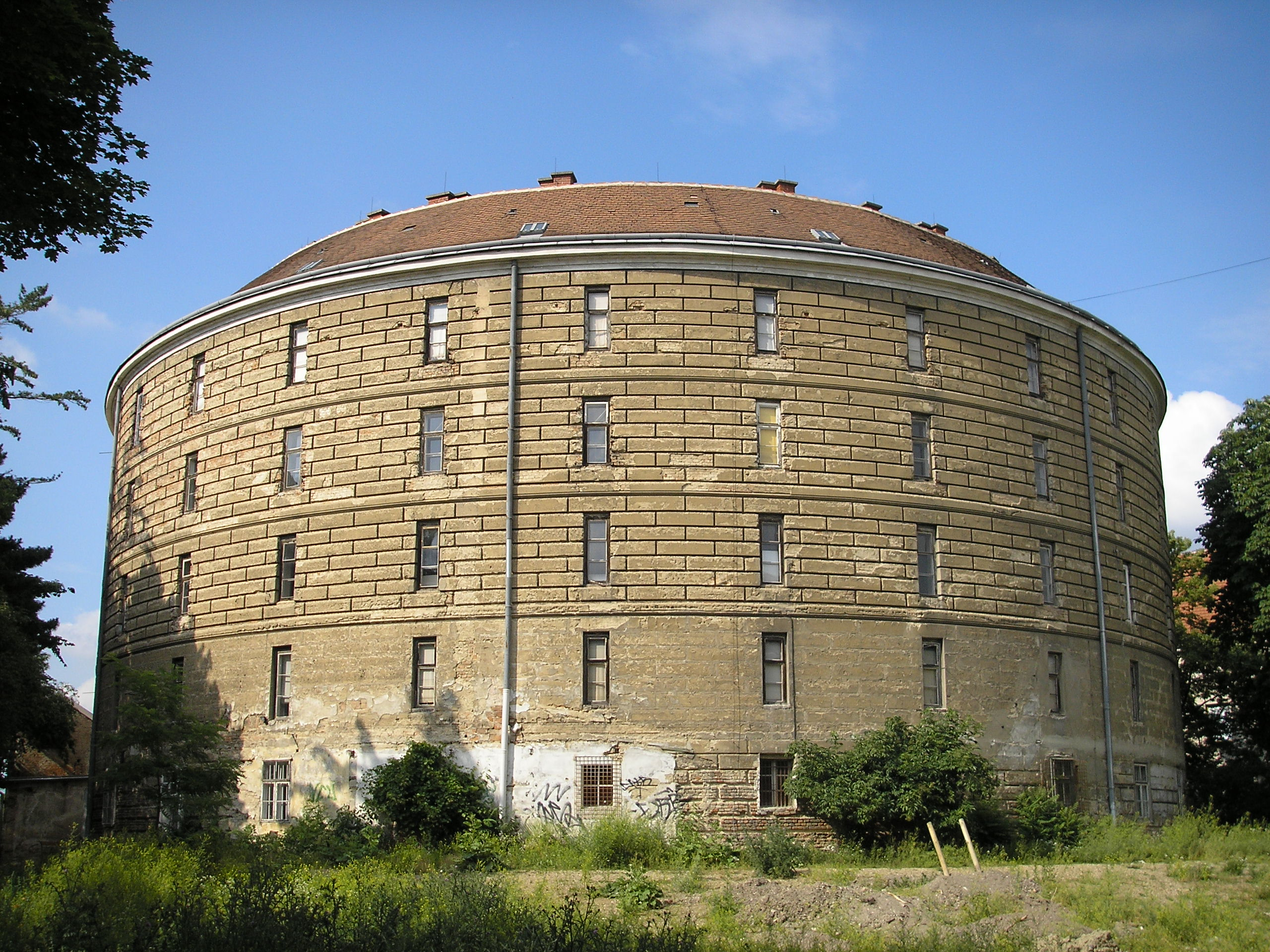
Vienna's Narrenturm—German for "fools' tower"—was one of the earliest buildings specifically designed for mentally ill people. It was built in 1784.

The 19th century saw a large expansion in the number and size of asylums in Western industrialised countries. In contrast to the prison-like asylums of old, these were designed to be comfortable places where patients could live and be treated, in keeping with the movement towards "moral treatment". In spite of these ideals, they became overstretched, non-therapeutic, isolated in location, and neglectful of patients.

=== 20th century ===
By the beginning of the 20th century, increasing admissions had resulted in serious overcrowding, causing many problems for psychiatric institutions. Funding was often cut, especially during periods of economic decline and wartime. Asylums became notorious for poor living conditions, lack of hygiene, overcrowding, ill-treatment, and abuse of patients; many patients starved to death. The first community-based alternatives were suggested and tentatively implemented in the 1920s and 1930s, although asylum numbers continued to increase up to the 1950s.

==== Eugenics and Aktion T4 ====
The eugenics movement started in the late 19th century, but reached the height of its influence between the two world wars. One stated aim was to improve the health of the nation by 'breeding out defects', isolating people with disabilities and ensuring they could not procreate. Charles Darwin's son lobbied the British government to arrest people deemed as 'unfit', then segregate them in colonies or sterilise them.

At the same time, in Germany medics and lawyers joined forces to argue for the extermination of people with disabilities. The 1920 essay, "Permitting the Destruction of Life Unworthy of Life" is seen by many as a blueprint for the Nazis' future crimes against humanity.

In 1939, the Nazi regime began 'Aktion T4'. Through this programme, psychiatric institutions for children and adults with disabilities were transformed into killing centres. The government compelled midwives to report all babies born with disabilities, then coerced parents to place their children in institutions. Visits were discouraged or forbidden. Then medical personnel transformed a programme of institutionalisation into extermination.

More than 5,000 children were killed in the network of institutions for children with disabilities, followed by more than 200,000 disabled adults. The medical and administrative teams who developed the first mass extermination programme were transferred – together with their killing technology – to set up and manage the death camps of Treblinka and Sobibor during the Holocaust.

The Nazi crimes against people with mental illness and disabilities in institutions was one of the catalysts for moving away from an institutionalised approach to mental health and disability in the second half of the 20th century.

==== Origins of the modern movement ====
The advent of chlorpromazine and other antipsychotic drugs in the 1950s and 1960s played an important role in permitting deinstitutionalisation, but it was not until social movements campaigned for reform in the 1960s that the movement gained momentum.

A key text in the development of deinstitutionalisation was Asylums: Essays on the Social Situation of Mental Patients and Other Inmates, a 1961 book by sociologist Erving Goffman. The book is one of the first sociological examinations of the social situation of mental patients. Based on his participant observation field work, the book details Goffman's theory of the "total institution" (principally in the example he gives, as the title of the book indicates, mental institutions) and the process by which it takes efforts to maintain predictable and regular behaviour on the part of both "guard" and "captor", suggesting that many of the features of such institutions serve the ritual function of ensuring that both classes of people know their function and social role, in other words of "institutionalizing" them.

Franco Basaglia, a leading Italian psychiatrist who inspired and was the architect of the psychiatric reform in Italy, also defined mental hospital as an oppressive, locked and total institution in which prison-like, punitive rules are applied, in order to gradually eliminate its own contents, and patients, doctors and nurses are all subjected (at different levels) to the same process of institutionalism. Other critics, such as the Italian physician Giorgio Antonucci, went further and campaigned against all involuntary psychiatric treatment. In 1970, Goffman worked with Thomas Szasz and George Alexander to found the American Association for the Abolition of Involuntary Mental Hospitalisation (AAAIMH), who proposed abolishing all involuntary psychiatric intervention, particularly involuntary commitment, against individuals. The association provided legal help to psychiatric patients and published a journal, The Abolitionist, until it was dissolved in 1980.

==== Reform ====
The prevailing public arguments, time of onset, and pace of reforms varied by country. Leon Eisenberg lists three key factors that led to deinstitutionalisation gaining support. The first factor was a series of socio-political campaigns for the better treatment of patients. Some of these were spurred on by institutional abuse scandals in the 1960s and 1970s, such as Willowbrook State School in the United States and Ely Hospital in the United Kingdom. The second factor was new psychiatric medications made it more feasible to release people into the community and the third factor was financial imperatives. There was an argument that community services would be cheaper. Mental health professionals, public officials, families, advocacy groups, public citizens, and unions held differing views on deinstitutionalisation.

However, the 20th century marked the development of the first community services designed specifically to divert deinstitutionalisation and to develop the first conversions from institutional, governmental systems to community majority systems (governmental-NGO-For Profit). These services are so common throughout the world (e.g., individual and family support services, groups homes, community and supportive living, foster care and personal care homes, community residences, community mental health offices, supported housing) that they are often "delinked" from the term deinstitutionalisation. Common historical figures in deinstitutionalisation in the US include Geraldo Rivera, Robert Williams, Burton Blatt, Wolf Wolfensberger, Gunnar Dybwad, Michael Kennedy, Frank Laski, Steven J. Taylor, Douglas P. Biklen, David Braddock, Robert Bogdan and K. C. Lakin. in the fields of "intellectual disabilities" (e.g., amicus curae, Arc-US to the US Supreme Court; US state consent decrees).

Community organising and development regarding the fields of mental health, traumatic brain injury, aging (nursing facilities) and children's institutions/private residential schools represent other forms of diversion and "community re-entry". Paul Carling's book, Return to the Community: Building Support Systems for People with Psychiatric Disabilities describes mental health planning and services in that regard, including for addressing the health and personal effects of "long term institutionalization". and the psychiatric field continued to research whether "hospitals" (e.g., forced involuntary care in a state institution; voluntary, private admissions) or community living was better. US states have made substantial investments in the community, and similar to Canada, shifted some but not all institutional funds to the community sectors as deinstitutionalisation. For example, NYS Education, Health and Social Services Laws identify mental health personnel in the state of New York, and the two term Obama Presidency in the US created a high-level Office of Social and Behavioral Services.

== Consequences ==
Community services that developed include supportive housing with full or partial supervision and specialised teams (such as assertive community treatment and early intervention teams). Costs have been reported as generally equivalent to inpatient hospitalisation, even lower in some cases (depending on how well or poorly funded the community alternatives are). Although deinstitutionalisation has been positive for the majority of patients, it also has shortcomings. Walid Fakhoury and Stefan Priebe suggest that modern day society now faces a new problem of "reinstitutionalisation". and many critics argue that the policy left patients homeless or in prison. Leon Eisenberg has argued that deinstitutionalisation was generally positive for patients, while noting that some were left homeless or without care.

=== Medication ===
There was an increase in prescriptions of psychiatric medication in the years following deinstitutionalisation. Although most of these drugs had been discovered in the years before, deinstitutionalisation made it far cheaper to care for a mental health patient and increased the profitability of the drugs. Some researchers argue that this created economic incentives to increase the frequency of psychiatric diagnosis (and related diagnoses, such as ADHD in children) that did not happen in the era of costly hospitalised psychiatry.

In most countries (except some countries that are either in extreme poverty or are hindered from importing psychiatric drugs by their customs regulations), more than 10% of the population are now on some form of psychiatric medicine. This increases to more than 15% in some countries such as the United Kingdom. A 2012 study by Kales, Pierce and Greenblatt argued that these medicines were being overprescribed.

=== Victimisation ===
Moves to community living and services have led to various concerns and fears, from both the individuals themselves and other members of the community. Over a quarter of individuals accessing community mental health services in a US inner-city area are victims of at least one violent crime per year, a proportion eleven times higher than the inner-city average. The elevated victim rate holds for every category of crime, including rape/sexual assault, other violent assaults, and personal and property theft. Victimisation rates are similar to those with developmental disabilities.

=== Misconceptions ===
There is a common perception by the public and media that people with mental disorders are more likely to be dangerous and violent if released into the community. However, a large 1998 study in Archives of General Psychiatry suggested that discharged psychiatric patients without substance abuse symptoms are no more likely to commit violence than others without substance abuse symptoms in their neighbourhoods, even when those neighbourhoods were already economically deprived and high in substance abuse and crime. The study also reports a higher proportion of institutionalised patients abusing substances compared to their non-institutionalised counterparts, therefore exacerbating the misconception.

Findings on violence committed by those with mental disorders in the community have been inconsistent and related to numerous factors; a higher rate of more serious offences such as homicide have sometimes been found but, despite high-profile homicide cases, the evidence suggests this has not been increased by deinstitutionalisation. The aggression and violence that does occur, in either direction, is usually within family settings rather than between strangers.

The argument that deinstitutionalisation has led to increases in homelessness can also be viewed a misconception with some suggesting a correlative rather than causative relationship between the two. It has been argued that in United States, loss of low-income housing and disability benefits are the core causes of homelessness historically and placing the blame on deinstitutionalisation is an oversimplification which does not take into account the other policy changes which occurred during the same time.

=== Reinstitutionalisation ===
Some mental health academics and campaigners have argued that deinstitutionalisation was well-intentioned for trying to make patients less dependent on psychiatric care, but in practice patients were still left being dependent on the support of a mental healthcare system, a phenomenon known as "reinstitutionalisation" or "transinstitutionalisation".

The argument is that community services can leave the mentally ill in a state of social isolation (even if it is not physical isolation), frequently meeting other service users but having little contact with the rest of the public community. Fakhoury and Priebe said that instead of "community psychiatry", reforms established a "psychiatric community". Julie Racino argues that having a closed social circle like this can limit opportunities for mentally ill people to integrate with the wider society, such as personal assistance services.

== Other criticisms ==
Criticism of deinstitutionalisation takes on a number of forms. Some, like E. Fuller Torrey, defend the use of psychiatric institutions and conclude that deinstitutionalisation was a move in the wrong direction entirely. Torrey has opposed deinstitutionalisation in principle, arguing that people with mental illness will be resistant to medical help due to the nature of their conditions. These views have made him a controversial figure in psychiatry. He believes that reducing psychiatrists' powers to use involuntary commitment led to many patients losing out on treatment, and that many who would have previously lived in institutions are now homeless or in prison.

Another form of critique argues that while deinstitutionalisation was a move in the right direction and had laudable goals, many shortcomings in the execution stage have made it unsuccessful thus far. New community services developed as alternatives to institutionalisation leave patients dependent still on the support of mental healthcare without clear evidence of providing adequate treatment and support. Multiple for-profit businesses, non-profit organisations and multiple levels of government involved have been criticised as being uncoordinated, underfunded and unable to meet complex needs. In a 1998 study of the effects of deinstitutionalisation in the United Kingdom, Means and Smith argue that the program had some successes, such as increasing the participation of volunteers in mental healthcare, but that it was underfunded and let down by a lack of coordination between the health service and social services.

Thomas Szasz, a longtime opponent of involuntary psychiatric treatment, argued that the reforms never addressed the aspects of psychiatry that he objected to, particularly his belief that mental illnesses are not true illnesses but medicalised social and personal problems.

== Worldwide ==
=== Asia ===
==== Hong Kong ====
In Hong Kong, a number of residential care services such as halfway houses, long-stay care homes, supported hostels are provided for the discharged patients. In addition, community support services such as rehabilitation day services and mental health care have been launched to facilitate the patients' re-integration into the community.

==== Japan ====
Unlike most developed countries, Japan has not followed a program of deinstitutionalization. The number of hospital beds has risen steadily over the last few decades. Physical restraints are used far more often. In 2014, more than 10,000 people were restrained–the highest ever recorded, and more than double the number a decade earlier. In 2018, the Japanese Ministry of Health introduced revised guidelines that placed more restrictions against the use of restraints.

=== Africa ===
Uganda has one psychiatric hospital. There are only 40 psychiatrists in Uganda. The World Health Organization estimates that 90% of mentally ill people in the country never get treatment.

There are no private psychiatric hospitals in Algeria--- the country instead makes drugs to assist with mental illness free of charge. Frantz Fanon Psychiatric Hospital is the largest public mental institution, with about 2,200 beds. Instead of deinstitutionalizing, the Frantz Fanon Psychiatric Hospital follows in the beliefs of their namesake, and is actually expanding rather than gradually withering away.

=== Australia and Oceania ===
==== New Zealand ====
New Zealand established a reconciliation initiative in 2005 to address the ongoing compensation payouts to ex-patients of state-run mental institutions in the 1970s to 1990s. A number of grievances were heard, including: poor reasons for admissions; unsanitary and overcrowded conditions; lack of communication to patients and family members; physical violence and sexual misconduct and abuse; inadequate mechanisms for dealing with complaints; pressures and difficulties for staff, within an authoritarian hierarchy based on containment; fear and humiliation in the misuse of seclusion; over-use and abuse of ECT, psychiatric medications, and other treatments as punishments, including group therapy, with continued adverse effects; lack of support on discharge; interrupted lives and lost potential; and continued stigma, prejudice, and emotional distress and trauma.

There were some references to instances of helpful aspects or kindnesses despite the system. Participants were offered counselling to help them deal with their experiences, along with advice on their rights, including access to records and legal redress.

=== Europe ===
==== Republic of Ireland ====
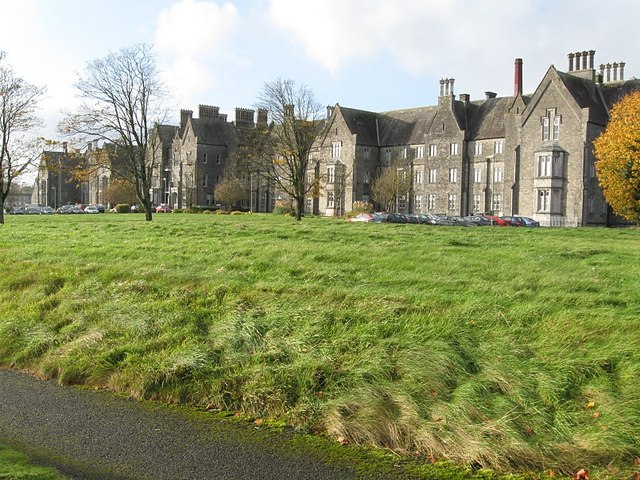
St. Loman's Hospital, Mullingar, Ireland, an infamous psychiatric hospital.

The Republic of Ireland formerly had the highest psychiatric hospitalisation rate of any Western country. The Lunatic Asylums (Ireland) Act 1875, the Criminal Lunatics (Ireland) Act 1838 and the Private Lunatic Asylums (Ireland) Act 1842 created a network of large "district asylums". The Mental Treatment Act 1945 caused some modernisation but by 1958 the Republic of Ireland still had the highest psychiatric hospitalisation rate in the world. In the 1950s and '60s there was a transition to outpatient facilities and care homes.

The 1963 Irish Psychiatric Hospital Census noted the extremely high hospitalisation rate of unmarried people; six times the equivalent in England and Wales. In all, about 1% of the population was living in a psychiatric hospital. In 1963–1978, Irish psychiatric hospitalisation rates were 2 1/2 times that of England. Health boards were set up in 1970 and the Health (Mental Services) Act 1981 was passed in order to prevent the wrongful hospitalisation of individuals. In the 1990s, there was still about 25,000 patients in the asylums.

In 2009, the government committed to closing two psychiatric hospitals every year; in 2008, there were still 1,485 patients housed in "inappropriate conditions". Today, Ireland's hospitalisation rate to a position of equality with other comparable countries. In the public sector virtually no patients remain in 19th-century mental hospitals; acute care is provided in general hospital units. Acute private care is still delivered in stand-alone psychiatric hospitals. The Central Mental Hospital in Dublin is used as a secure psychiatric hospital for criminal offenders, with room for 84 patients.

==== Italy ====
Italy was the first country to begin the deinstitutionalisation of mental health care and to develop a community-based psychiatric system. The Italian system served as a model of effective service and paved the way for deinstitutionalisation of mental patients. Since the late 1960s, the Italian physician Giorgio Antonucci questioned the basis itself of psychiatry. After working with Edelweiss Cotti in 1968 at the Centro di Relazioni Umane in Cividale del Friuli – an open ward created as an alternative to the psychiatric hospital – from 1973 to 1996 Antonucci worked on the dismantling of the psychiatric hospitals Osservanza and Luigi Lolli of Imola and the liberation – and restitution to life – of the people there secluded. In 1978, the Basaglia Law had started Italian psychiatric reform that resulted in the end of the Italian state mental hospital system in 1998.

The reform was focused on the gradual dismantlement of psychiatric hospitals, which required an effective community mental health service. The object of community care was to reverse the long-accepted practice of isolating the mentally ill in large institutions and to promote their integration in a socially stimulating environment, while avoiding subjecting them to excessive social pressures.

The work of Giorgio Antonucci, instead of changing the form of commitment from the mental hospital to other forms of coercion, questions the basis of psychiatry, affirming that mental hospitals are the essence of psychiatry and rejecting any possible reform of psychiatry, that must be eliminated.

==== United Kingdom ====
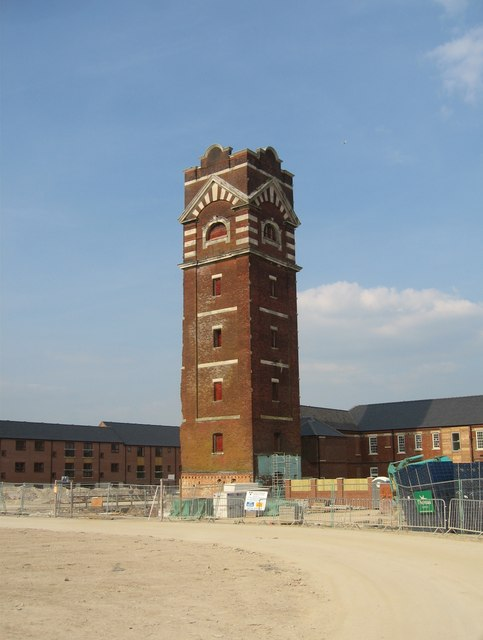
The water tower of Park Prewett Hospital in Basingstoke, Hampshire. The hospital was redeveloped into a housing estate after its closure in 1997.

In the United Kingdom, the trend towards deinstitutionalisation began in the 1950s. At the time, 0.4% of the population of England were housed in asylums. The government of Harold Macmillan sponsored the Mental Health Act 1959, which removed the distinction between psychiatric hospitals and other types of hospitals. Enoch Powell, the Minister of Health in the early 1960s, criticised psychiatric institutions in his 1961 "Water Tower" speech and called for most of the care to be transferred to general hospitals and the community. The campaigns of Barbara Robb and several scandals involving mistreatment at asylums (notably Ely Hospital) furthered the campaign. The Ely Hospital scandal led to an inquiry led by Brian Abel-Smith and a 1971 white paper that recommended further reform.

The policy of deinstitutionalisation came to be known as Care in the Community at the time it was taken up by the government of Margaret Thatcher. Large-scale closures of the old asylums began in the 1980s. By 2015, none remained.

=== North America ===
==== United States ====
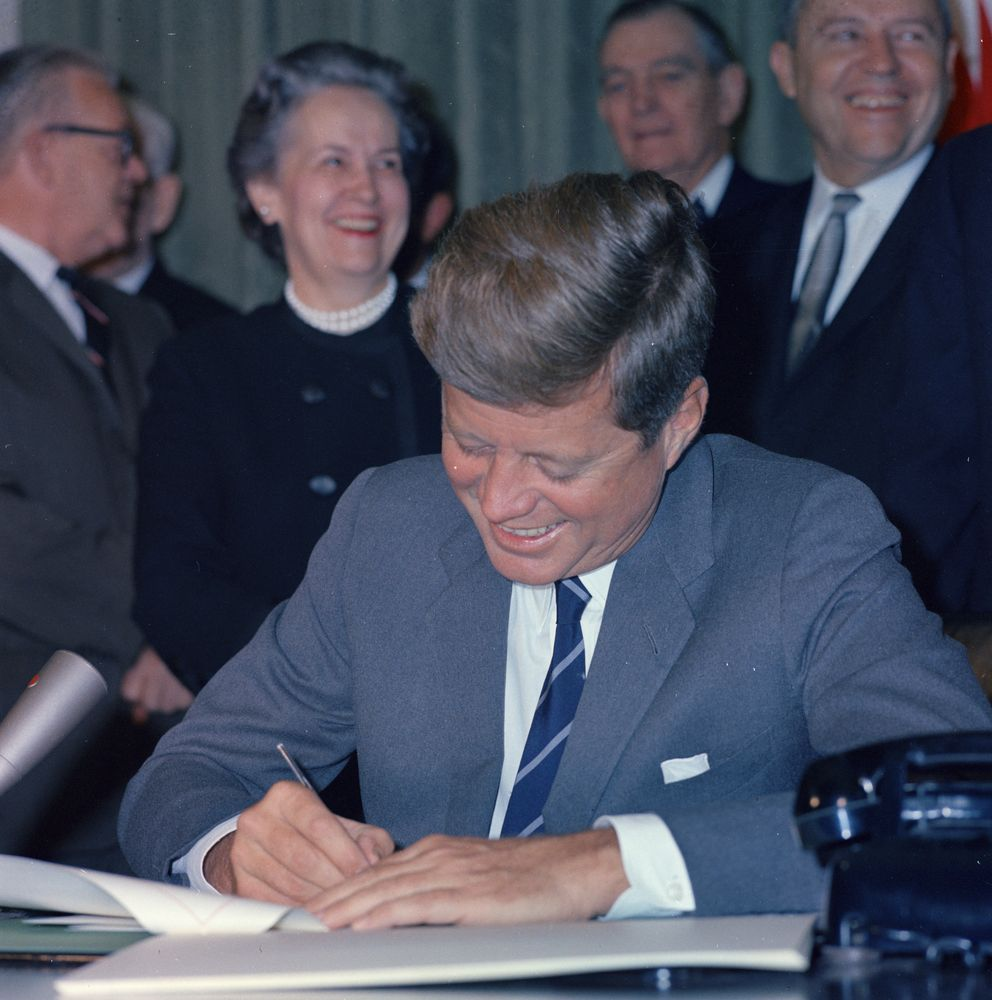
President John F. Kennedy signs the Community Mental Health Act on 31 October 1963.

The United States has experienced two main waves of deinstitutionalisation. The first wave began in the 1950s and targeted people with mental illness. The second wave began roughly 15 years later and focused on individuals who had been diagnosed with a developmental disability. Loren Mosher argues that deinstitutionalisation fully began in the 1970s and was due to financial incentives like SSI and Social Security Disability, rather than after the earlier introduction of psychiatric drugs.

The most important factors that led to deinstitutionalisation were changing public attitudes to mental health and mental hospitals, the introduction of psychiatric drugs and individual states' desires to reduce costs from mental hospitals. The federal government offered financial incentives to the states to achieve this goal. Stroman pinpoints World War II as the point when attitudes began to change. In 1946, Life magazine published one of the first exposés of the shortcomings of mental illness treatment. Also in 1946, Congress passed the National Mental Health Act of 1946, which created the National Institute of Mental Health (NIMH). NIMH was pivotal in funding research for the developing mental health field.

President John F. Kennedy had a special interest in the issue of mental health because his sister, Rosemary, had incurred brain damage after being lobotomised at the age of 23. His administration sponsored the successful passage of the Community Mental Health Act, one of the most important laws that led to deinstitutionalisation. The movement continued to gain momentum during the Civil Rights Movement. The 1965 amendments to Social Security shifted about 50% of the mental health care costs from states to the federal government, motivating state governments to promote deinstitutionalisation. The 1970s saw the founding of several advocacy groups, including Liberation of Mental Patients, Project Release, Insane Liberation Front, and the National Alliance on Mental Illness (NAMI).

The lawsuits these activist groups filed led to some key court rulings in the 1970s that increased the rights of patients. In 1973, a federal district court ruled in Souder v. Brennan that whenever patients in mental health institutions performed activity that conferred an economic benefit to an institution, they had to be considered employees and paid the minimum wage required by the Fair Labor Standards Act of 1938. Following this ruling, institutional peonage was outlawed. In the 1975 ruling O'Connor v. Donaldson, the U.S. Supreme Court restricted the rights of states to incarcerate someone who was not violent. This was followed up with the 1978 ruling Addington v. Texas, further restricting states from confining anyone involuntarily for mental illness. In 1975, the United States Court of Appeals for the First Circuit ruled in favour of the Mental Patient's Liberation Front in Rogers v. Okin, establishing the right of a patient to refuse treatment. Later reforms included the Mental Health Parity Act, which required health insurers to give mental health patients equal coverage.

Other factors included scandals. A 1972 television broadcast exposed the abuse and neglect of 5,000 patients at the Willowbrook State School in Staten Island, New York. The Rosenhan's experiment in 1973 caused several psychiatric hospitals to fail to notice fake patients who showed no symptoms once they were institutionalised. The pitfalls of institutionalisation were dramatised in an award-winning 1975 film, One Flew Over the Cuckoo's Nest.

In 1955, for every 100,000 US citizens there were 340 psychiatric hospital beds. In 2005 that number had diminished to 17 per 100,000.

=== South America ===
In several South American countries, such as in Argentina, the total number of beds in asylum-type institutions has decreased, replaced by psychiatric inpatient units in general hospitals and other local settings.

In Brazil, there are 6,003 psychiatrists, 18,763 psychologists, 1,985 social workers, 3,119 nurses and 3,589 occupational therapists working for the Unified Health System (SUS). At primary care level, there are 104,789 doctors, 184,437 nurses and nurse technicians and 210,887 health agents. The number of psychiatrists is roughly 5 per 100,000 inhabitants in the Southeast region, and the Northeast region has less than 1 psychiatrist per 100,000 inhabitants. The number of psychiatric nurses is insufficient in all geographical areas, and psychologists outnumber other mental health professionals in all regions of the country. The rate of beds in psychiatric hospitals in the country is 27.17 beds per 100,000 inhabitants. The rate of patients in psychiatric hospitals is 119 per 100,000 inhabitants. The average length of stay in mental hospitals is 65.29 days.

== See also ==
- Homeless dumping
- Obligatory Dangerousness Criterion
- Outpatient commitment

General

- Ableism
- Ankang (asylum)
- Institutional syndrome
- Involuntary commitment
- Inclusion (disability rights)
- Mental health
- Public housing
- Psychiatric survivors movement
- Right to housing
- Voluntary commitment

== Bibliography ==
- Borus, J.F. (August 1981). "Sounding Board. Deinstitutionalization of the chronically mentally ill". New England Journal of Medicine. 305 (6): 339–42. doi:10.1056/NEJM198108063050609. PMID 7242636.
- Pepper, B.; Ryglewicz, H (1985). "The role of the state hospital: a new mandate for a new era". Psychiatric Quarterly. 57 (3–4): 230–57. doi:10.1007/BF01277617. PMID 3842522. S2CID 19658053.
- Sharfstein, S.S. (August 1979). "Community mental health centers: returning to basics". American Journal of Psychiatry. 136 (8): 1077–9. doi:10.1176/ajp.136.8.1077. PMID 464136.
- Torrey, E. Fuller; Zdanowicz, Mary (4 August 1998). "Why deinstitutionalization turned deadly". Wall Street Journal. Archived from the original on 9 March 2016.
- Davis, DeWayne L.; Fox-Grage, Wendy; Gehshan, Shelly (January 2000). "Deinstitutionalization of Persons with Developmental Disabilities: A Technical Assistance Report for Legislators" (PDF). National Conference of State Legislatures. Archived (PDF) from the original on 2017-02-02.
- Torrey, E. Fuller (1997). "Deinstitutionalization: A Psychiatric 'Titanic'". PBS Frontline.
- Torrey, E. Fuller (1997). Out of the shadows: confronting America's mental illness crisis. New York: John Wiley. ISBN 978-0-471-16161-5.
