= Gianni Berengo Gardin =

Italian photographer (1930–2025)

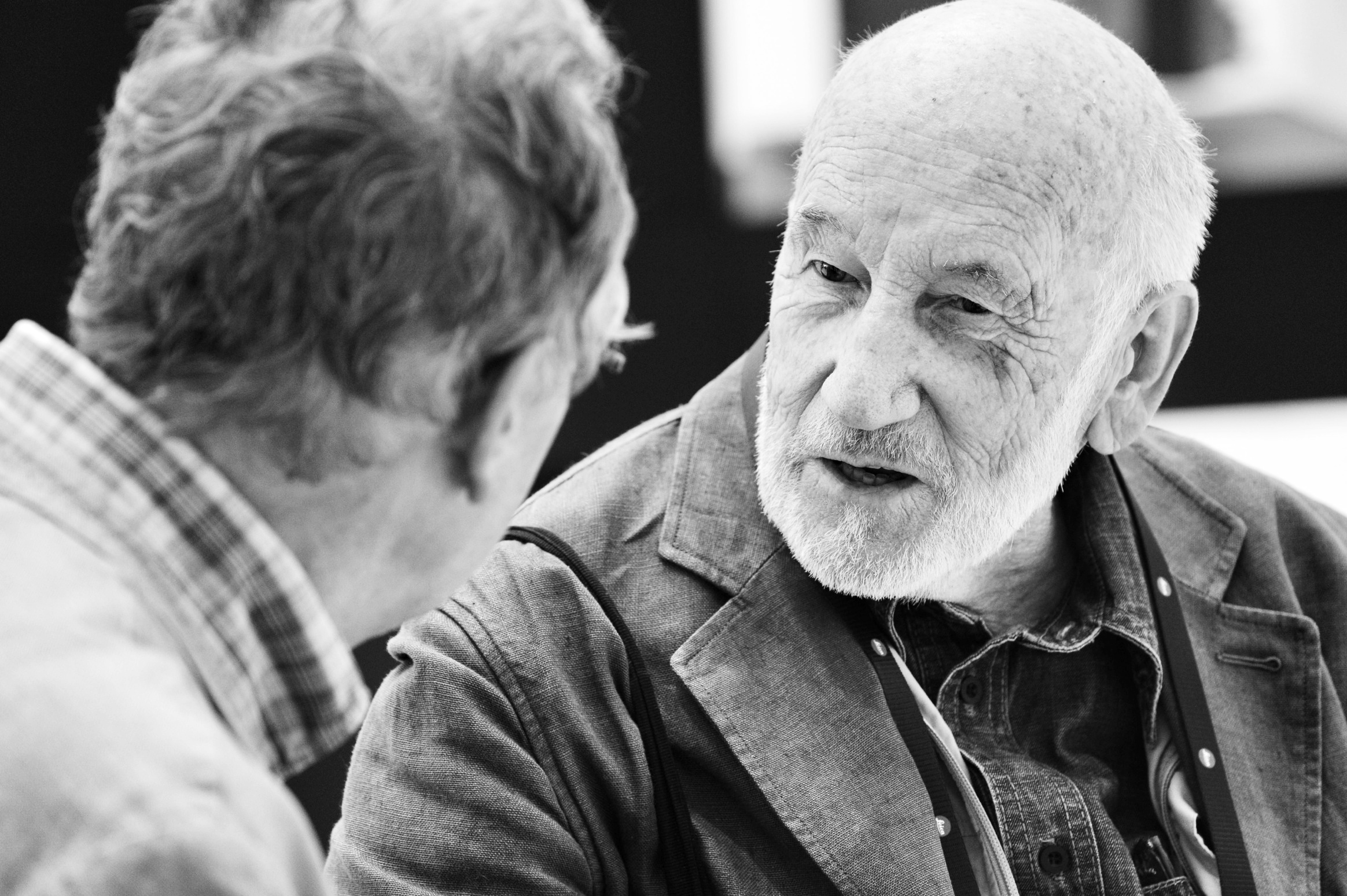
Berengo Gardin in 2015

Gianni Berengo Gardin (10 October 1930 – 6 August 2025) was an Italian photographer who concentrated on reportage and editorial work, but whose career as a photographer encompassed book illustration and advertising.

"Undoubtedly the most important photographer in Italy in the latter part of the 20th century", "[f]or more than fifty years Gianni Berengo Gardin has been taking photographs with the humility and passion of a great craftsman."

== Life and career ==
Born in Santa Margherita Ligure on 10 October 1930, Berengo Gardin lived in Switzerland, Rome, Paris, and Venice before starting as an amateur photographer in 1954. As a photographer, he was self-taught, learning photography from the two years he spent in Paris working with other photographers.

In Berengo Gardin's first year as a photographer, 1954, his first photographs were published in Il Mondo. This magazine, edited by Mario Pannunzio, was one to which both amateurs and professionals liked to submit their work, although until 1959 the photographs were not attributed to particular photographers. It "pursued a photographic aesthetic that privileged street scenes and odd, ironic or bizarre encounters in both town and country", and "more than a third of the photographs published in Il Mondo were by [Berengo Gardin]." His "rare capacity for capturing simultaneous actions and objects within the same frame positioned him as an excellent candidate for that street life Pannunzio was after." Berengo Gardin would later have photo essays published in Domus, Epoca, l'Espresso, Stern, Time, Vogue Italia; Réalités; Le Figaro; and La Repubblica.

He turned professional in 1962 and two years later moved to Milan, where he lived from 1975 onwards.

From 1966 to 1983, Berengo Gardin worked with Touring Club Italiano, providing much or all of the photography for books about regions of Italy and other European countries or their cities: he once identified the high point of his career as "The work I did in Great Britain, for the Touring Club in 1978" (adding that "I loved the cars: I had an Austin and an MG"). He did similar work for the publisher Istituto Geografico De Agostini (later De Agostini Publishing). In 1979 Berengo Gardin started to work with Renzo Piano, photographing the process of designing his buildings. Berengo Gardin also worked with major Italian firms – Alfa Romeo, Fiat, Italsider (later Ilva), Olivetti and others – showing the working life of employees, rather than the products.

In the early 1990s, Berengo Gardin spent time living among the Romani people (Zingari) of Italy, hoping to show their lives from the inside. This resulted in two highly regarded books, La disperata allegria (Florence) and Zingari a Palermo (1994 and 1997).

From 1990, Berengo Gardin was represented by Contrasto.

Berengo Gardin remained active in his eighties. An assignment, from la Repubblica, was to photograph the giant cruise ships that threaten the ecosystem of Venice.

Berengo Gardin had a large archive, with over 1.5 million negatives. The FORMA Foundation (Fondazione FORMA per la Fotografia, an offshoot of Contrasto), in Milan, will be managing this archive, including negatives, prints, documents and cameras. (Other material is at the Museum of Modern Art, New York.)

Berengo Gardin named as influences on him the French photographers Henri Cartier-Bresson, Willy Ronis, Édouard Boubat and Robert Doisneau; others have identified the Italian group La Gondola and the American photographer W. Eugene Smith.

Gianni Berengo Gardin is one of the great generation of poetic documentarists who like to compose with an idea in mind [...] [H]is sympathies have always been with those whose day-to-day activities support the fabric of society: workers, doctors, priests and even itinerant musicians.

Berengo Gardin died on 6 August 2025, at the age of 94.

== Vaporetto, Venice, 1960 ==
Vaporetto, Venice, 1960, © Copyright Gianni Berengo Gardin

Berengo Gardin's "most renowned image of Venice", often referred to as Vaporetto, Venice, 1960: (Note: The title or caption varies, even in Italian. Italo Zannier, ed, Gianni Berengo Gardin: fotografie 1953–1990 (Udine: Art&, 1990; ISBN 88-85893-23-6): "Venezia, il vaporetto, 1960". Mario Peliti, et al, eds, © Copyright Gianni Berengo Gardin ([Rome]: Peliti Associati, 2001; ISBN 88-85121-69-1): "Venezia, 1960". (In each of these books, the plates are neither numbered nor on numbered pages.) As for English, here are three examples. Gianni Berengo Gardin, ed. Susanna Berengo Gardin, Italians = Italiener (Kempen: teNeues, 2000; ISBN 3-8238-5453-4), plate 58: "Venice: in a vaporetto, 1960". Roberto Koch and Alessandro Mauro, eds, Gianni Berengo Gardin (Rome: Contrasto due, 2005; ISBN 978-88-89032-72-5), plate 11: "On a vaporetto, Venice, 1960". Denis Curti, ed., Gianni Berengo Gardin: Stories of a Photographer (Venice: Marsilio, 2013; ISBN 978-88-317-1501-0), first (unnumbered) plate: "Venice, aboard a vaporetto, 1960".)

was taken in 1960, on a vaporetto with mirrored doors so that the passengers are trapped in a mosaic of reflections. Simultaneously mundane – the travellers are ordinary commuters – and exotic, it captures the paradox of a city trapped in an excess of representation.

Berengo Gardin described how it came about:

I was 30, living on the Lido in Venice, and every morning I took the vaporetto, or water bus, across to where I worked in San Marco. [...] It was a matter of pure luck, really. I was doing a lot of architectural photography, and this was a spontaneous shot: I only took one picture. In the centre there is a reflection in the glass door of the vaporetto, behind which stands a man all dressed in black. If he'd been wearing white, the shot wouldn't have worked.

The photograph was included in Berengo Gardin's book Venise des saisons (1965). It was warmly received; Henri Cartier-Bresson:

ranked [this photograph] among the 80 most important photographs ever taken. The co-presence of gazes and of frames within a frame makes it an exceptional in-camera montage of different spaces and human figures, reminiscent of Velasquez's illusions, and suggestive of this photographer's multiple artistic influences: the French school of reportage (Doisneau, Boubat, Ronis) and a group of Venetian photographers called La Gondola [...] and Eugene Smith's powerful renditions of black and white. At the end of the 1950s this new kind of reportage seemed to reconcile social documentary with the photographer's subjective exploration of the world, thus putting an end to the dispute about form and content that had divided many postwar image makers. (Note: "In 2003, Henri Cartier-Bresson was curator of an exhibition, Les Choix d'Henri Cartier-Bresson, for his newly inaugurated Paris Foundation. This presented a variety of works that resonated for him, by a range of international artists. Gianni Berengo Gardin's Vaporetto was among the images included." "Gianni Berengo Gardin (B. 1930) Vaporetto, 1960 (sale 4225 lot 10)". Christie's. 12 June 2012.)

== Books ==
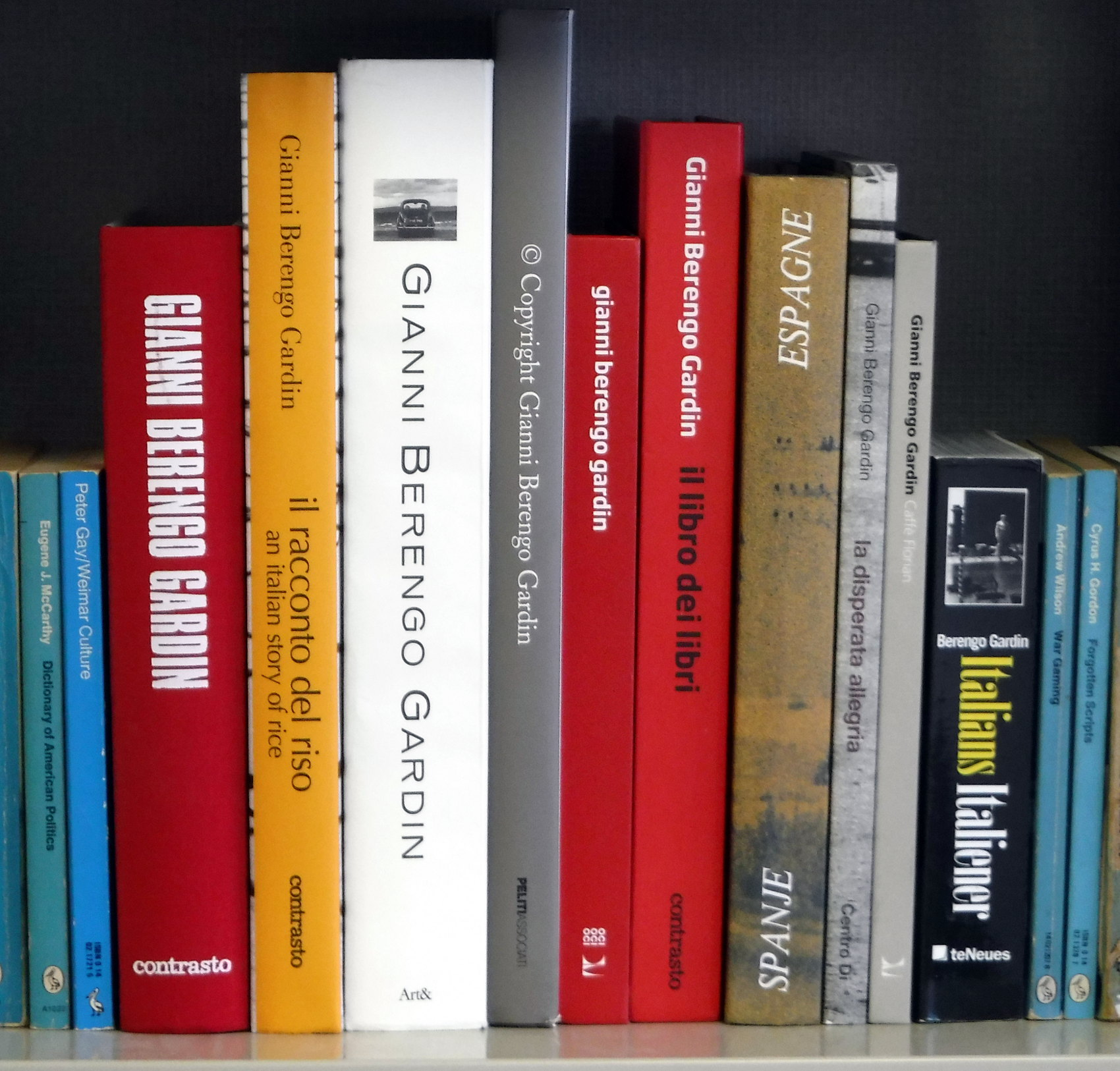
A small selection of photobooks by Gianni Berengo Gardin (flanked by irrelevant Pelicans)

Berengo Gardin was the sole contributor or a major contributor to a large number of photobooks: the exact number up to any time depends on various definitions – what a separate book is (as opposed to a mere new edition), what a "major" contribution is, and more – but one estimate in 2014 put the number at 250 (and added that "only 10 are in colour").

Morire di classe (1969) is probably the most celebrated among Berengo Gardin's books. (Note: Alone among books by Berengo Gardin, it is introduced in Martin Parr and Gerry Badger's three-volume survey of photobooks; specifically, in The Photobook: A History, vol 2 (London: Phaidon, 2006; ISBN 0-7148-4433-0), p.246) Other award-winning books (see "Awards") include India dei villaggi (1981, about the villages of India) and La disperata allegria and Zingari a Palermo (1994 and 1997, about the Romani people of Florence and Palermo respectively).

"Books such as Dentro le case and Dentro il lavoro are some of the best journalistic records of how people worked and lived in post-WWII Italy." (Note: Both books have photographs by Berengo Gardin (Rome and farther north) and Luciano D'Alessandro (Rome and farther south); Dentro le case was first published in 1977, Dentro il lavoro the following year. (The latter should not be confused with Berengo Gardin's Dentro il lavoro. Nello studio di Andrea Martinelli, of 2005.))

== Exhibitions ==
Berengo Gardin had many exhibitions: the number was described in 2008 as "around 200". A small sample is listed below.

- Architectural Association, London, 1961
- Le Guilde du Livre, Lausanne, 1965
- Il nuovo impegno. Il Diaframma, Milan, November 1968. Exhibition by Berengo Gardin, Cesare Colombo and Toni Nicolini.
- Napoli '81. Sette fotografi per una nuova immagine. Naples, December 1981 – January 1982. Photographs of Naples by Berengo Gardin, Mario Cresci, Roberto Salbitani, Franco Fontana, Luigi Ghirri, Mimmo Jodice, and Antonia Mulas.
- Fotografie di Gianni Berengo Gardin per Il Mondo dal 1954 al 1965. Palazzo Dugani, Milan, January–February 1985.
- Trouver Trieste. Eiffel Tower, November 1985 – June 1986. Photographs of Trieste by various photographers.
- Bologna Museum of Modern Art, 1987
- Rencontres internationales de la photographie d'Arles, July–August 1987.
- Refettorio delle Stelline, Milan, 1988
- Photographs of women. Rome, 1989.
- Milan, 1990.
- Paris, 1990
- Musée de l'Élysée, Lausanne, 1991
- Fotografi italiani, Accademia Carrara, Bergamo, 1993
- Gianni Berengo Gardin, un nomade fotografo. Giardino delle Oblate, Florence, October 1994. About Romani people in Florence.
- Ring. Galleria d'arte moderna, Bologna, 1994. Photographs by Berengo Gardin and Gabriele Basilico.
- Artelaguna '95: opere d'arte per la laguna di Venezia. June–July 1995.
- The Italian Metamorphosis, 1943–1968 (group exhibition). Solomon R. Guggenheim Museum, New York, October 1994 – January 1995.
- Leica Gallery, New York, 1999.
- Gianni Berengo Gardin, Maison de la photographie Robert Doisneau, Paris, 1997; Museo civico del Santo, Padua, 2001; Palazzo delle Esposizioni, Rome, 2001; Biblioteca Panizzi, Reggio Emilia, 2002; Auditorium, Rome, 2004; La Triennale di Milano, 2004
- Pagine di fotografia italiana 1900–1998, Fondazione Galleria Gottardo, Lugano, 1998
- Memorie di un dilettante: Vintage prints 1952–1960. Galleria Minima Peliti Associati, June–July 1998.
- Exhibition related to Giò Pomodoro. International Cairo Biennale, in Cairo, December 1998 – February 1999.
- Palazzo delle Esposizioni, Rome, 2001
- Retrospective. Museo Civico di Padova, Padua, June–October 2001.
- Les Choix d'Henri Cartier-Bresson (group exhibition). Henri Cartier-Bresson Foundation, Paris, 2003.
- Toscana, gente e territorio. About the people and land of Tuscany. Fondazione Ragghianti (Lucca), July–October 2004.
- Miracolo a Pisogne. Pisogne, 2004. About the sculptor Adolf Vallazza and the painter Girolamo Romanino.
- Piazza Lucretius, 2005.
- Cesare Zavattini. Tra letteratura, cinema, pittura. Pinacoteca Civica di Latina, October–December 2005. About Cesare Zavattini.
- Gianni Berengo Gardin. Maison européenne de la photographie, Paris, February–May 2005.
- L'altro sguardo = Mit anderen Augen = A distinct regard. Bolzano, July–October 2005. About Gustav Mahler Jugendorchester and European Union Youth Orchestra.
- Travelling exhibition about the Hera Group.
- Andrea Martinelli: il volto e l'ombra. Società per le Belle Arti ed Esposizione Permanente, Milan, November–December 2005; Rustin Foundation, Antwerp, March–June 2006; Frisia Museum, Spanbroek-Amsterdam, July–October 2006. About the works of the painter Andrea Martinelli.
- Leopardi: la biblioteca, la casa, l'infinito. Palazzo Ducale, Urbino, September–October 2006. On the house and library of Giacomo Leopardi.
- Exhibition about Carlo Scarpa. Museo Palladio, Vicenza, June–July 2006.
- Un paesaggio italiano. Travelling exhibition about Giovo.
- Exhibition of photographs of the studio of Andrea Martinelli. Casa Cavalier Pellanda, Biasca, December 2007 – February 2008.
- Exhibition about Andrea Martinelli. Milan, 2008.
- Mimmo Paladino: ortissima. Palazzo Penotti Ubertini, Orta San Giulio, July–November 2009.
- Peggy Guggenheim, la casa, gli amici, Venezia. Arca, Vercelli, Vercelli, October–December 2009. About Peggy Guggenheim.
- Exhibition about Camogli. Fondazione Pier Luigi e Natalina Remotti, Camogli, Italy, October 2009 – January 2010.
- Reportrait: incursioni di un reporter nel mondo della cultura = Incursions of a reporter into the world of culture. Palazzo Penotti Ubertini, Orta San Giulio, May–October 2009. Portraits.
- Nei luoghi di Piero della Francesca; Arezzo, Anghiari, Sansepolcro = In Piero della Francesca places. Photographs by Berengo Gardin and Elliott Erwitt. Palazzo Pichi Sforza, Sansepolcro, March–June 2010.
- Terra da vivere. Palazzo Pretorio, Figline Valdarno, February–May 2011.
- Gianni Berengo Gardin. Storie di un fotografo. Casa dei Tre Oci, Venice, February–May 2013.
- Gianni Berengo Gardin. Storie di un fotografo. Palazzo Reale, June–September 2013.
- Caffè Florian, September–October 2013.
- Gianni Berengo Gardin: Storie di un fotografo. Curated by Denis Curti. Palazzo Ducale, Genoa, February–June 2014.
- Mostri a Venezia (Monsters of Venice). Villa Necchi Campiglio, Milan, 2014. Concerning the problems of large cruise ships in Venice.
- The Sense of a Moment: Gianni Berengo Gardin. Prahlad Bubbar Gallery, London, April–May 2014. ("It is the first time Berengo Gardin has shown in Britain since 1975, when Bill Brandt included him in his seminal landscape show at the Victoria and Albert Museum.")
- Venezia e le grandi navi. Negozio Olivetti, Venice, – January 2016.
- Vera fotografia: Reportage, immagini, incontri. Palazzo delle Esposizioni, Rome, May–August 2016. Curated by Alessandra Mammì and Alessandra Mauro.

== Awards ==
- World Press Photo award (1963)
- Scanno prize (1981) for the book India dei villaggi (about the villages of India)
- Brassaï prize at the Mois de la Photo in Paris (1990)
- Leica Oskar Barnack Award (1995) at Rencontres internationales de la photographie d'Arles for the book La disperata allegria: vivere da zingari a Firenze (about the Romani people of Florence)
- Oscar Goldoni prize (1998) for the book Zingari a Palermo (about the Romani people of Palermo)
- Lucie Awards Lifetime Achievement (2008)
- Honorary degree, University of Milan (2009).

== Collections ==
- Calcografia Nazionale, Rome; since 1975 Istituto Nazionale per la Grafica
- Archive of the photography group La Gondola, Venice
- CSAC, University of Parma
- Centro per la Fotografia San Marino Immagine, San Marino
- Fondazione Antonio Mazzotta, Milan
- Galleria Civica di Modena
- Istituto di Storia dell'Arte, University of Pisa
- Museo di fotografia Ken Damy, Brescia
- Bibliothèque nationale de France, Paris. 76 photographs.
- Maison européenne de la photographie, Paris
- FNAC, Paris
- Musée de l'Élysée, Lausanne
- Fondation Select, Lausanne
- Museum of Modern Art, New York
- United Nations headquarters, New York
- Eastman House, Rochester, NY (now George Eastman Museum)

== Further viewing ==
- Gianni Berengo Gardin. Rome: GIART/Contrasto, 2009. In the series Fotografia italiana: 5 film, 5 grandi fotografi. (Note: Introduced in Bruno Carbone, ed. Gianni Berengo Gardin. Il libro dei libri. Rome: Contrasto Due, 2013. ISBN 978-88-6965-444-2.)
