= Michele Tansella =

Italian psychiatrist (1942–2015)

Michele Tansella (2 October 1942 – 1 March 2015) was an Italian psychiatrist known for his work in epidemiological psychiatry. He was the founding editor-in-chief of the academic journal Epidemiology and Psychiatric Sciences, which he founded in 1992 under the name Epidemiologia e Psichiatria Sociale.

== Education and career ==
Tansella received his M.D. from the University of Bari in 1966, after which he began working at the Mario Negri Institute in Milan, Italy. He later moved to the Institute of Psychiatry, Psychology and Neuroscience in London, England, where he met Michael Shepherd, whom he later considered his mentor. In the early 1970s, he began teaching in the Institute of Psychiatry at the University of Verona.

== Michele Tansella Award ==
After his death, the World Psychiatric Association established the Michele Tansella Award in his memory by the Association's Sections on Epidemiology and Public Health. The award is given to epidemiology/psychiatry researchers early in their careers.
