= Resocialization =

Process of reinsertion of former prisoners into society

Resocialization or resocialisation (British English) is the process by which one's sense of social values, beliefs, and norms are re-engineered. The process is deliberately carried out in military boot camps through an intense social process or may take place in a total institution. An important thing to note about socialization is that what can be learned can be unlearned. That forms the basis of resocialization: to unlearn and to relearn.

Resocialization can be defined also as a process by which individuals, defined as inadequate according to the norms of a dominant institution, are subjected to a dynamic redistribution of those values, attitudes and abilities to allow them to function according to the norms of the said dominant institutions. That definition relates more to a jail sentence. If individuals exhibit deviance, society delivers the offenders to a total institution, where they can be rehabilitated.

Resocialization varies in its severity. A mild resocialization might be involved in moving to a different country. One who does so may need to learn new social customs and norms such as language, eating, dress, and talking customs. A more drastic example of resocialization is joining a military or a cult, and the most severe example would be if one suffers from a loss of all memories and so would have to relearn all of society's norms.

The first stage of resocialization is the destruction of an individual's former beliefs and confidence.

== Institutions ==
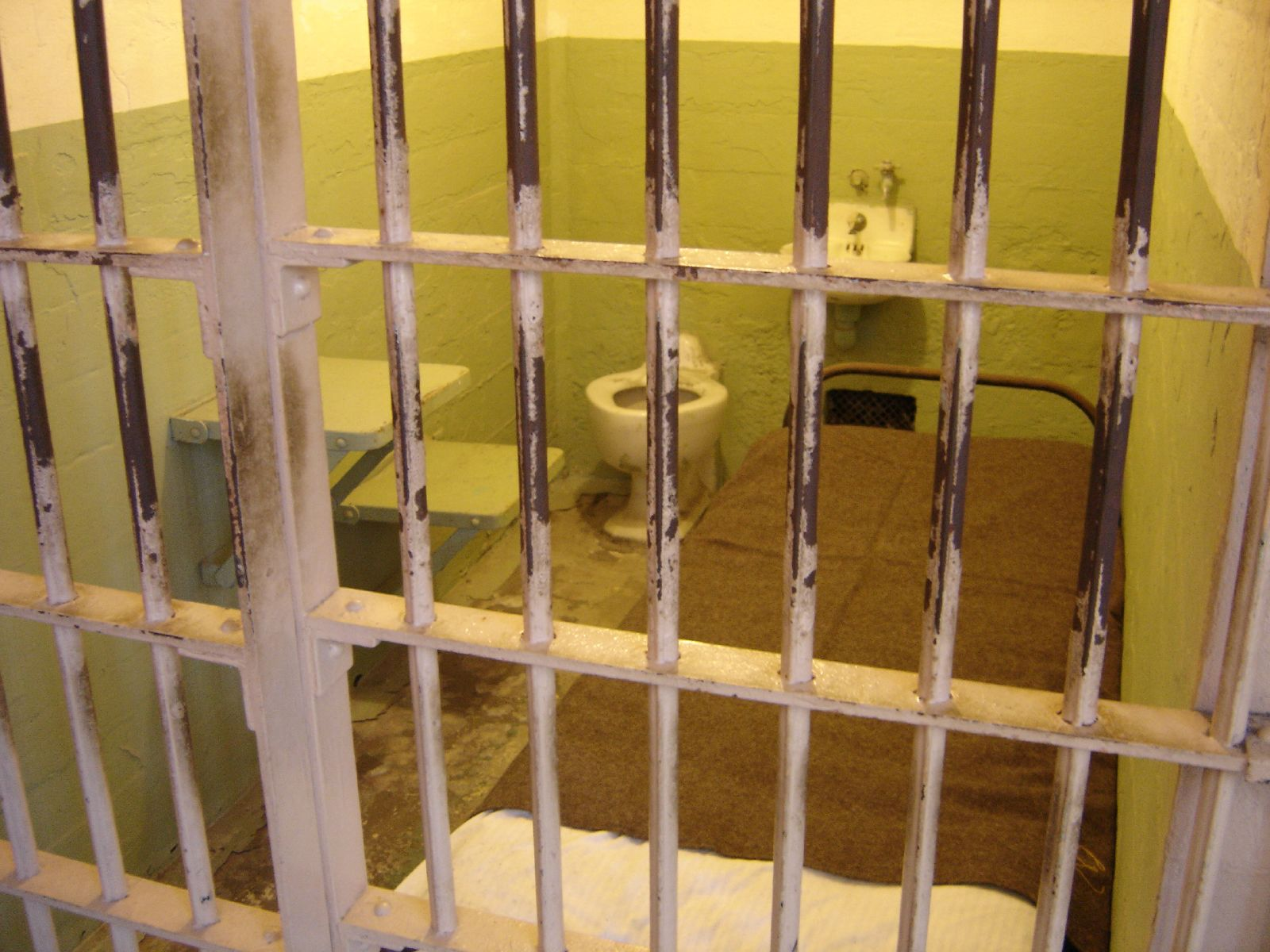
A prison cell

The goal of total institutions is resocialization, which radically alters residents' personalities by deliberate manipulation of their environment. A total institution refers to an institution in which one is totally immersed and controls all of one's day-to-day life. All activity occurs in a single place under a single authority. Examples of a total institution include prisons, fraternity houses, and the military.

Resocialization is a two-part process. First, the institutional staff try to erode the residents' identities and independence. Strategies to erode identities include forcing individuals to surrender all personal possessions, get uniform haircuts and wear standardized clothing. Independence is eroded by subjecting residents to humiliating and degrading procedures. Examples are strip searches, fingerprinting, and assigning serial numbers or code names to replace the residents' given names.

The second part of resocialization process involves the systematic attempt to build a different personality or self. That is generally done through a system of rewards and punishments. The privilege of being allowed to read a book, watch television, or make a phone call can be a powerful motivator for conformity. Conformity occurs when individuals change their behavior to fit in with the expectations of an authority figure or the expectations of the larger group.

No two people respond to resocialization programs in the same manner. Some residents are found to be "rehabilitated," but others might become bitter and hostile. As well, over a long period of time, a strictly-controlled environment can destroy a person's ability to make decisions and live independently, which is known as institutionalisation, a negative outcome of total institution that prevents an individual from ever functioning effectively in the outside world again. (Sproule, 154–155)

Resocialization is also evident in individuals who have never been "socialized" in the first place or have not been required to behave socially for an extended period of time. Examples include feral children (never socialized) or inmates who have been in solitary confinement.

Socialization is a lifelong process. Adult socialization often includes learning new norms and values that are very different from those associated with the culture in which the person was raised. The process can be voluntary. Currently, joining a volunteer military qualifies as an example of voluntary resocialization. The norms and values associated with military life are different from those associated with civilian life (Riehm, 2000).

The sociologist Erving Goffman studied resocialization in mental institutions. He characterized the mental institution as a total institution, one in which virtually every aspect of the inmates' lives is controlled by the institution and calculated to serve the institution's goals. For example, the institution requires patients to comply with certain regulations, even when that is not necessarily in the best interest of individuals.

== In military ==
Those who join the military enter a new social realm in which they become socialized as military members. Resocialization is defined as a "process wherein an individual, defined as inadequate according to the norms of a dominant institution(s), is subjected to a dynamic program of behavior intervention aimed at instilling and/or rejuvenating those values, attitudes, and abilities which would allow... to function according to the norms of said dominant institution(s)."

Boot camp serves as an example for understanding how military members are resocialized within the total institution of the military. According to Fox and Pease (2012), the purpose of military training, like boot camp, is to "promote the willing and systematic subordination of one’s own individual desires and interests to those of one’s unit and, ultimately, country." To accomplish it, all aspects of military members' lives exist within the same military institution and are controlled by the same "institutional authorities" (drill instructors) and are done to accomplish the goals of the total institution. The individual's "civil[ian] identity, with its built-in restraints is eradicated, or at least undermined and set aside in favor of the warrior identity and its central focus upon killing." This warrior identity or ethos, is the mindset and group of values that all United States armed forces aim to instill in their members. Leonard Wong in “Leave No Man Behind: Recovering America’s Fallen Warriors,” describes the warrior ethos as placing the mission above all else, not accepting defeat, not ever quitting, and never leaving another American behind.

Military training prepares individuals for combat by promoting traditional ideas of masculinity, like training individuals to disregard their bodies' natural reactions to run from fear, have pain or show emotions. Although resocialization through military training can create a sense of purpose in military members, it can also create mental and emotional distress when members are unable to achieve set standards and expectations.

Military members, in part, find purpose and meaning through resocialization because the institution provides access to symbolic and material resources, helping military members construct meaningful identities. Fox and Pease state, "like any social identity, military identity is always an achievement, something dependent upon conformity to others' expectations and their acknowledgment. The centrality of performance testing in the military, and the need to 'measure up,' heightens this dependence. Although resocialization through military training can create a sense of purpose in military members, it also has the likelihood to create mental and emotional distress when members are unable to achieve set standards and expectations."

In the first couple of days, the most important aspect of basic training is the surrender of their identity. Recruits in basic training are exposed to a degrading process, where leaders break down the recruits’ civilian selves and essentially give them a new identity. The recruits go through a brutal, humbling, and physically and emotionally exhausting process. They are subjected to their new norms, language, rules, and identity. Recruits shed their clothes and hair, which are the physical representation of their old identities. The processes happen very quickly and allows no time for recruits to think over the loss of their identity and so the recruits have no chance to regret their decisions.

Drill sergeants then give the young men and women a romanticized view on what it is to be a soldier and how manly it is. When the training starts, it is physically demanding and gets harder every week. The recruits are constantly insulted and put down to break down their pride and destroy their ability to resist the change that they are undergoing. Drill sergeants put up a facade that tells their recruits that finishing out basic training sets them apart from all of the others who fail. However, almost all recruits succeed and graduate from basic training.

The training is also set up with roles. There are three younger drill sergeants closer to the recruits in age and one senior drill sergeant, who becomes a father figure to the new recruits. The company commander plays a god-like role, which the recruits look up to. The people in the roles will become role models and authority figures but also help to create a sense of loyalty to the entire organization.

Recruits are made to march in a formation in which every person moves the same way at the same time, which causes a sense of unity. It makes the recruits feel less like individuals and more like parts of a group. They sing in cadence to boost morale and to make the group feel important. Drill sergeants also feed the group small doses of triumphs to keep the soldiers proud and feeling accomplished. According to Jeff Parker Knight, the ultimate function for these songs is described as “marching precision,” but Knight argues that these jodies have a secondary socialization purpose that creates a type of “rite of passage” for the recruits. These jody performances, “reflect martial attitudes, and, as symbolic action, help to induce attitude changes in initiates.”

The troop also undergoes group punishment, which unifies the unit. Generally, the similar hatred of something will bring everyone together. In this case, group punishment allows all the recruits to hate the drill sergeants and the punishment but to find unity within their unit. They will encourage others to push themselves and create shared hardships.

== In prisons ==
Prisons have two different types of re-socialization. The first type is that prisoners must learn the new normal behaviors that apply to their new environment. The second type is the prisoners must partake in rehabilitation measures to help fix their deviant ways. When the individual violates the dominant society's norms, the criminal system subjects them to a form of re-socialization called criminal rehabilitation.

Rehabilitation aims to bring an inmate's real behavior closer to that of most individuals, who make up the dominant society. The ideal societal behavior is highly valued in many societies, mainly because it serves to protect and promote the well-being of most of the society's members. In rehabilitation, the system strips the criminal of his prior socialization of criminal behavior, including the techniques of committing a crime and the specific motives, drives, rationalizations, and attitudes. Criminal behavior is learned behavior and so can be unlearned.

The first step towards rehabilitation is the choice of milieu. That is the type of interactions the deviant has with the people around him in custody. Usually, that is determined after psychological and sociological screenings are performed on the criminal. The second step is diagnosis, a continual process influenced by feedback from the individual's behavior. The next stage is treatment, which is dependent on the diagnosis. Whether it is treating an addiction or redefining the values of a person, the treatment is what socializes the criminal back to societal norms.
