= Interactionism =

Sociological theory

In micro-sociology, interactionism is a theoretical perspective that sees social behavior as an interactive product of the individual and the situation. In other words, it derives social processes (such as conflict, cooperation, identity formation) from social interaction, whereby subjectively held meanings are integral to explaining or understanding social behavior.

This perspective studies the ways in which individuals shape, and are shaped by, society through their interactions. Interactionism thus argues that the individual is an active and conscious piece of the social-context system, rather than merely a passive object in their environment. It believes interactions to be guided by meanings that are attached to the self, to others with whom each individual interacts, and to situations of interaction; all of which are altered in interaction themselves. In this sense, interactionism may stand in contrast to studies of socialization, insofar as interactionism conceives individuals to influence groups at least as much as groups influence individuals.

George Herbert Mead, as an advocate of pragmatism and the subjectivity of social reality, is considered a leader in the development of interactionism. Herbert Blumer expanded on Mead's work and coined the term symbolic interactionism.

Through this perspective (under modern techniques), one may observe human behavior by three parts: trait, situation, and interaction (between trait and situation). 'Trait' refers to the extent to which personality directly affects behaviour, independent of the situation (and therefore consistently across different situations); 'situation' takes into account the extent to which all different people will provide basically the same response to a given situation; and 'interaction' involves the ways in which the same situation affects individual people differently.

== Subcategories and scholars ==
Interactionism has several subcategories:

- Classical interactionism
- Ethnomethodology
- Holistic interactionism
- Phenomenology
- Social action
- Social constructionism
- Symbolic interactionism (Blumerian interactionism)
- Verstehen

=== Influential scholars ===
- George Herbert Mead
- Charles Cooley
- W. I. Thomas
- Herbert Blumer
- Everett Hughes
- Erving Goffman
- Anselm Strauss
- Ralph Turner

== Interactions ==
Interactionism is micro-sociological perspective that argues meaning to be produced through the interactions of individuals.

The social interaction is a face-to-face process consisting of actions, reactions, and mutual adaptation between two or more individuals, with the goal of communicating with others. (It also includes animal interaction such as mating.) The interaction includes all language (including body language) and mannerisms. If the interaction is in danger of ending before one intends it to, it can be conserved by conforming to the others' expectations, by ignoring certain incidents or by solving apparent problems.

Erving Goffman underlined the importance of control in the interaction: one must attempt to control the others' behaviour during the interaction, in order to attain the information one is seeking and to control the perception of one's own image. Important concepts in the field of interactionism include the "social role" and Goffman's "presentation of self."

== Methodology ==
Interactionists are interested in how people see themselves in the broader social context and how they act within society.

In extreme cases, interactionists would deny social class to be an issue, arguing that people from one class cannot be generalized to all think in one way. Instead, these interactionists believe everyone has different attitudes, values, culture, and beliefs. Therefore, it is the duty of the sociologist to carry out the study within society; they set out to gather qualitative data.

=== Rejection of positivist methods ===
Interactionists reject statistical (quantitative) data, a method preferred by post-positivists. These methods include: experiments, structured interviews, questionnaires, non-participant observation, and secondary sources. This rejection is based in a few basic criticisms, namely:

- Statistical data is not "valid;" in other words, these methods do not provide people with a true picture of society on the topic being researched.
- Quantitative research is biased and therefore not objective. Whilst the sociologist would be distant, it is argued that the existence of a hypothesis implies that the research is biased towards a pre-set conclusion (e.g., Rosenhan experiment in 1973). Therefore, such research is rejected by interactionists, who claim that it is artificial and also raises ethical issues to experiment on people.

=== Preferred interactionist methods ===
Interactionists prefer several methods to contrast those of structuralism, particularly: unstructured interviews, covert participant observation, overt participant observation, and content analysis via analysing historical, public, and personal documents.

Interactionist methods generally reject the absolute need to provide statistics. Statistics allows cause-and-effect to be shown, as well as isolating variables so that relationships and trends can be distinguished over time. Instead, interactionists want to "go deep" to explain society, however this draws criticisms, including:

- Information and sociological research cannot be compared or contrasted, hence one can never truly understand how society changes.
- Data is not reliable.
- Gathered information is interpreted (hence the name "Interpretivist") by a sociologist, therefore it is not objective.

Despite these criticisms, interactionist methods do allow flexibility. The fact that there is no hypothesis means that the sociologist is not rooted in an attempt to prove dogma or theory. Instead, researchers react to what they discover, not assuming anything about society. (This is not entirely true: there can be hypotheses for many studies using interactionist methods. The researcher may then be inclined to observe certain events happening while ignoring the bigger picture. This will still bias the results, if such studies are not well conducted. This is arguably why some theorists have turned to this method. It also shows how human behaviour is affected and altered through interactions i.e. socialization.)

=== Case studies ===
- Field experiments:
  - In the Rosenhan experiment, David Rosenhan (1973) found 8 normal researchers to carry out a study, at 12 hospitals, of the treatment of mental health in California. Critics argue that the method was unethical, and the vast majority of interactionists concur.
- Unstructured interviews:
  - Aaron Cicourel and John Kitsuse (1963) conducted an ethnomethodology study in American schools.
  - Howard Becker (1971)
  - William Labov (1973) conducted a study of sociolinguistics.
  - Joan Smith (1998)
- Participant observation:
  - John Howard Griffin
  - Michael Haralambos.

== Links to other theories ==
Interactionism, or the idea that individuals have more awareness, skill and power to change their own situation, links to several other theories.

- Neo-Marxism is a loose term for various 20th-century approaches that amend or extend Marxism and Marxist theory, usually by incorporating elements from other intellectual traditions, such as critical theory, psychoanalysis, or existentialism.
- Pluralism is the idea that the "public gets what the public wants." It is the notion that our lives offer choice like a representative democracy. This idea of consumer choice means that each individual has power as a consumer to change any aspect of life if he/she wishes to do so. The situation that exists is, according to the theory, a reflection of the norms, values and beliefs of the majority of people. It fits with the idea of individual power, although interactionist sociologists may not accept the idea that we are all labeled as "consumers".

== See also ==
- Interpersonal relationship
- Niklas Luhmann
- Situational ethics
- Social interactionist theory
