= Behavior in Public Places =

1963 book by Erving Goffman

Behavior in Public Places: Notes on the Social Organization of Gatherings is a 1963 book by American sociologist Erving Goffman.

It is one of several books by Goffman which focuses on everyday public interactions. Here he draws distinctions between several types of public gatherings ("gatherings", "situations", "social occasions") and types of audiences (acquainted versus unacquainted). One of its major premises is that face-to-face interactions embody certain rules that follow a certain logic regardless of the occasions in which they occur. Many of the examples in the book are drawn from or contrasted with Erving's earlier experiences as a visiting member of the National Institute of Mental Health in the 1950s.

He also discusses three levels of social interaction: "nonperson treatment: which one person does not acknowledge the presence of another person; "civil inattention", whereby some form of subtle, implicit acknowledgement is provided; and "encounter", which is an explicit engagement.
