= Patrick James =

Patrick James may refer to:

- Patrick James (businessman), American businessman, CEO and owner of First Brands
- Patrick James (professor) (born 1957), professor of international relations
- Patrick James (singer), Irish singer, winner of series 4 of The Voice of Ireland

== See also ==
- James Patrick (disambiguation)
