= Interaction Ritual: Essays on Face-to-Face Behavior =

1967 book by Erving Goffman

Interaction Ritual: Essays on Face-to-Face Behavior is a 1967 book by Erving Goffman.

Goffman's Interaction Ritual: Essays on Face-to-Face Behavior is a collection of six essays. The first four were originally published in the 1950s, the fifth in 1964, and the last was written for the collection. They include "On Face-work" (1955); "The Nature of Deference and Demeanor" (1956); "Embarrassment and Social Organization" (1956); "Alienation from Interaction" (1957); "Mental Symptoms and Public Order" (1964); and "Where the Action Is".

The first essay, "On Face-work", discusses the concept of face, which is the positive self-image a person holds when interacting with others. Goffman believes that face "as a sociological construct of interaction is neither inherent in nor a permanent aspect of the person". Once someone offers a positive self-image of him- or herself to others, they feel a need to maintain and live up to that image. Inconsistency in how a person projects him- or herself in society risks embarrassment and discredit. So people remain guarded to ensure that they do not show themselves to others in an unfavorable light.
