= Asylums (book) =

1961 book by Erving Goffman

Asylums: Essays on the Social Situation of Mental Patients and Other Inmates
- Author: Erving Goffman
- Language: English
- Subject: Total institutions
- Publisher: Anchor Books
- Publication date: 1961
- Publication place: United States
- Media type: Print (Hardcover and Paperback)
- Pages: 386
- OCLC: 744111

The book Asylums: Essays on the Social Situation of Mental Patients and Other Inmates was written by the Canadian-born American sociologist Erving Goffman. It was initially published by Anchor Books, Doubleday & Co in the United States in 1961 and was published by Penguin Classics in the United Kingdom in 2022. It comprises four essays: On the Characteristics of Total Institutions, The Moral Career of the Mental Patient, The Underlife of a Public Institution and The Medical Model and Mental Hospitalization.

== Goffman's methodology ==
Based on his participant observation field work (he was employed as a physical therapist's assistant under a grant from the National Institute of Mental Health at a mental institution in Washington, D.C.), Goffman details his theory of the "total institution" (principally in the example he gives, as the title of the book indicates, mental institutions) and the process by which it takes efforts to maintain predictable and regular behavior on the part of both "guard" and "captor", suggesting that many of the features of such institutions serve the ritual function of ensuring that both classes of people know their function and social role, in other words of "institutionalising" them. Goffman concludes that adjusting the inmates to their role has at least as much importance as "curing" them. In the essay "Notes on the Tinkering Trades", Goffman concluded that the "medicalization" of mental illness and the various treatment modalities are offshoots of the 19th century and the Industrial Revolution and that the so-called "medical model" for treating patients was a variation on the way trades- and craftsmen of the late 19th century repaired clocks and other mechanical objects: in the confines of a shop or store, contents and routine of which remained a mystery to the customer.

== The essays ==
The first chapter, "Characteristics of Total Institutions," provides a comprehensive examination of social life within institutions, heavily citing two examples — mental asylums and prisons. This chapter outlines the topics to be elaborated on in subsequent chapters and their place within the overall discussion. The second chapter, "The Moral Career of the Mentally Ill," examines the preliminary impacts of "institutionalization" on the social relationships of those who have not yet become inmates. The third chapter, "The Underlife of Public Institutions," focuses on what people expect from inmates in terms of attachment to an institution that is supposed to be a fortress, as well as how inmates maintain some distance from these expectations. The fourth chapter, "Medical Models and Mental Hospitalization," shifts the focus back to institutional staff, using mental hospitals as an example to examine the role of medical viewpoints in presenting the situation to the inmates.

== Critical reception ==
According to Weinstein (1994), '[i]n 1969, the first year the SSCI was published, Goffman's book received 87 citations in the literature.' Cox responded in 1978 and Richard responded in 1984. Studies in the 1990s included Fine and Martin (1990). Later studies include Adlam et al. (2013), Suibhne (2011), Capps (2016), Bouras (2014) and Schlinzig (2022).

== See also ==
- Stanford prison experiment
