= Stigma: Notes on the Management of Spoiled Identity =

1963 book by Erving Goffman

Stigma: Notes on the Management of Spoiled Identity is a 1963 book by Erving Goffman. The book examines how people protect themselves and their identities when they depart from socially approved standards of behavior or appearance.

People manage others' impressions of themselves, mainly through concealment. Stigma pertains to the shame a person may feel when he or she fails to meet other people's standards, and to the fear of being discredited. This shame and fear causes the person not to reveal his or her differences or perceived shortcomings. For example, a person with a criminal record may simply withhold that information for fear of judgment by whomever that person happens to encounter.

An important concept within the book is passing, whereby a person with a stigma blends in with normals by way of not disclosing personal attributes.

== See also ==
- Masking (behavior) – temporarily behaving in a way that hides differences
