= Tie signs =

Clues pointing to a relationship

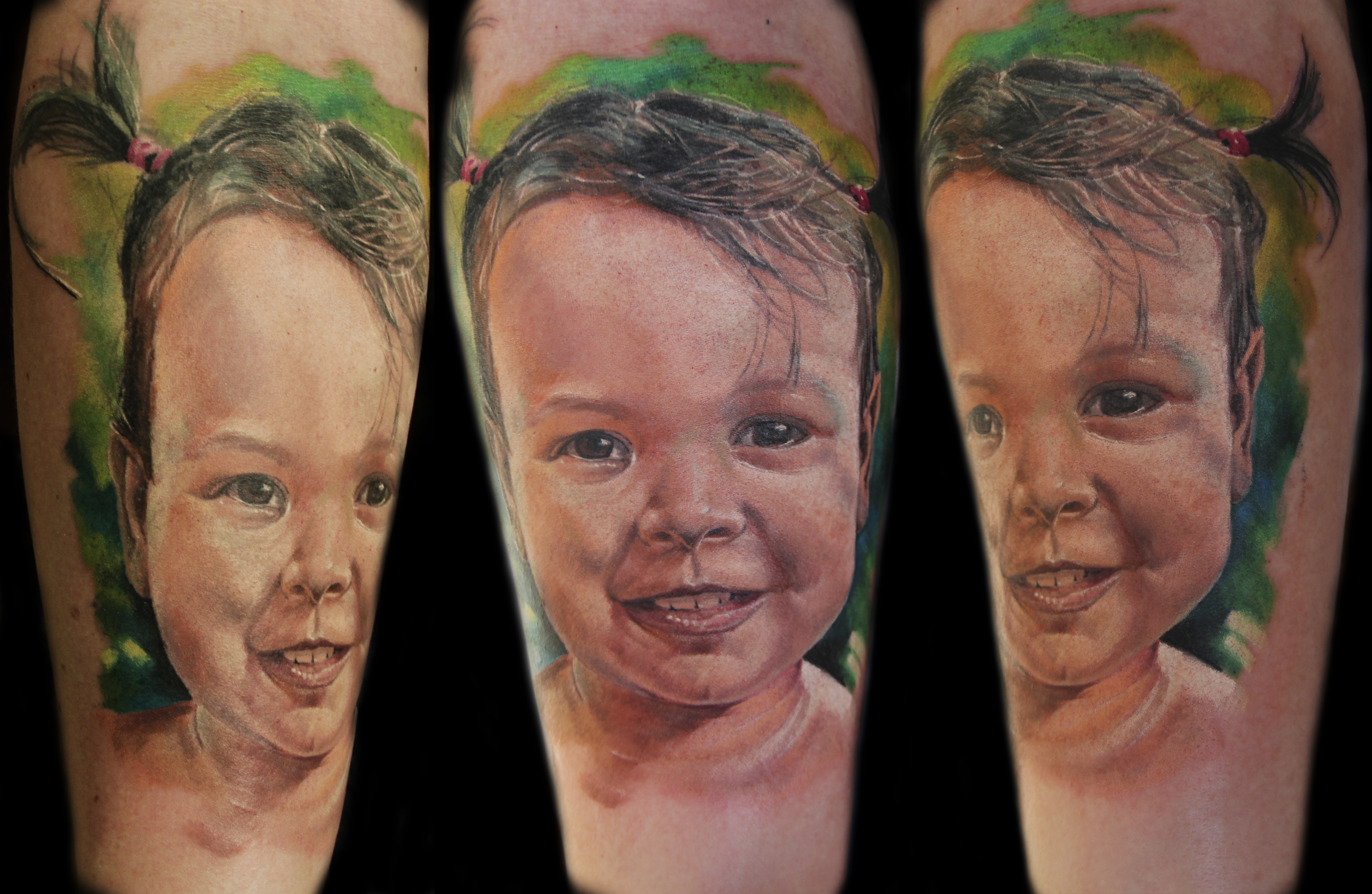
Tattoos are common examples of tie signs that signify a relationship between the wearer and the subject of the tattoo.

Tie signs are signs, signals, and symbols, that are revealed through people's actions as well as objects such as engagement rings, wedding bands, and photographs of a personal nature that suggest a relationship exists between two people. For romantic couples, public displays of affection (PDA) including things like holding hands, an arm around a partner's shoulders or waist, extended periods of physical contact, greater-than-normal levels of physical proximity, grooming one's partner, and “sweet talk” are all examples of common tie signs. Tie signs inform the participants, as well as outsiders, about the nature of a relationship, its condition, and even what stage a relationship is in.

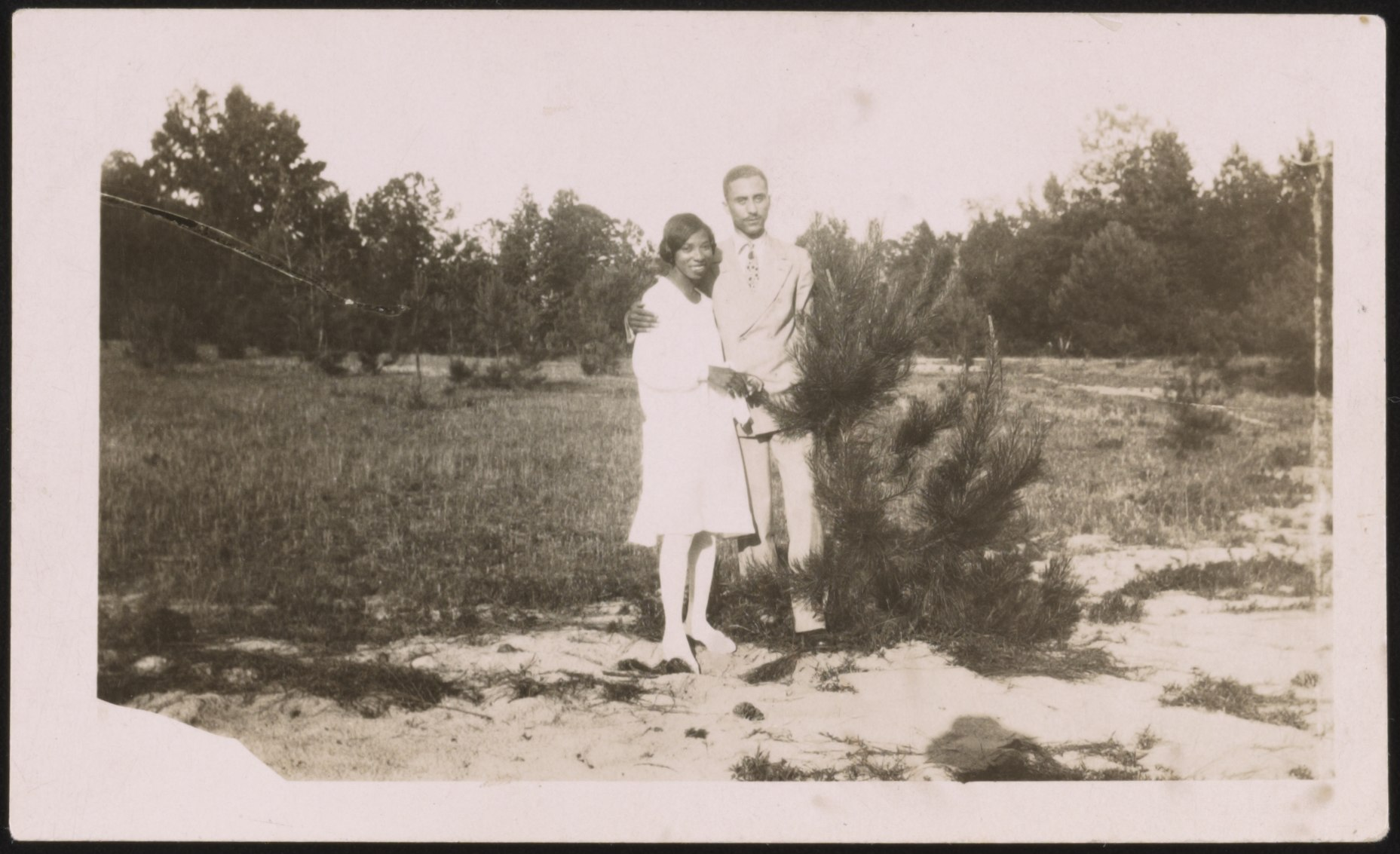
Holding someone close is an example of a tie sign, as are photographs of such actions.

== Background ==
Origination of the term "tie sign" has been attributed to Desmond Morris, an English zoologist and author, by at least one source. However, Erving Goffman is also credited with employing the term in 1959, almost two decades earlier.

== Usage ==
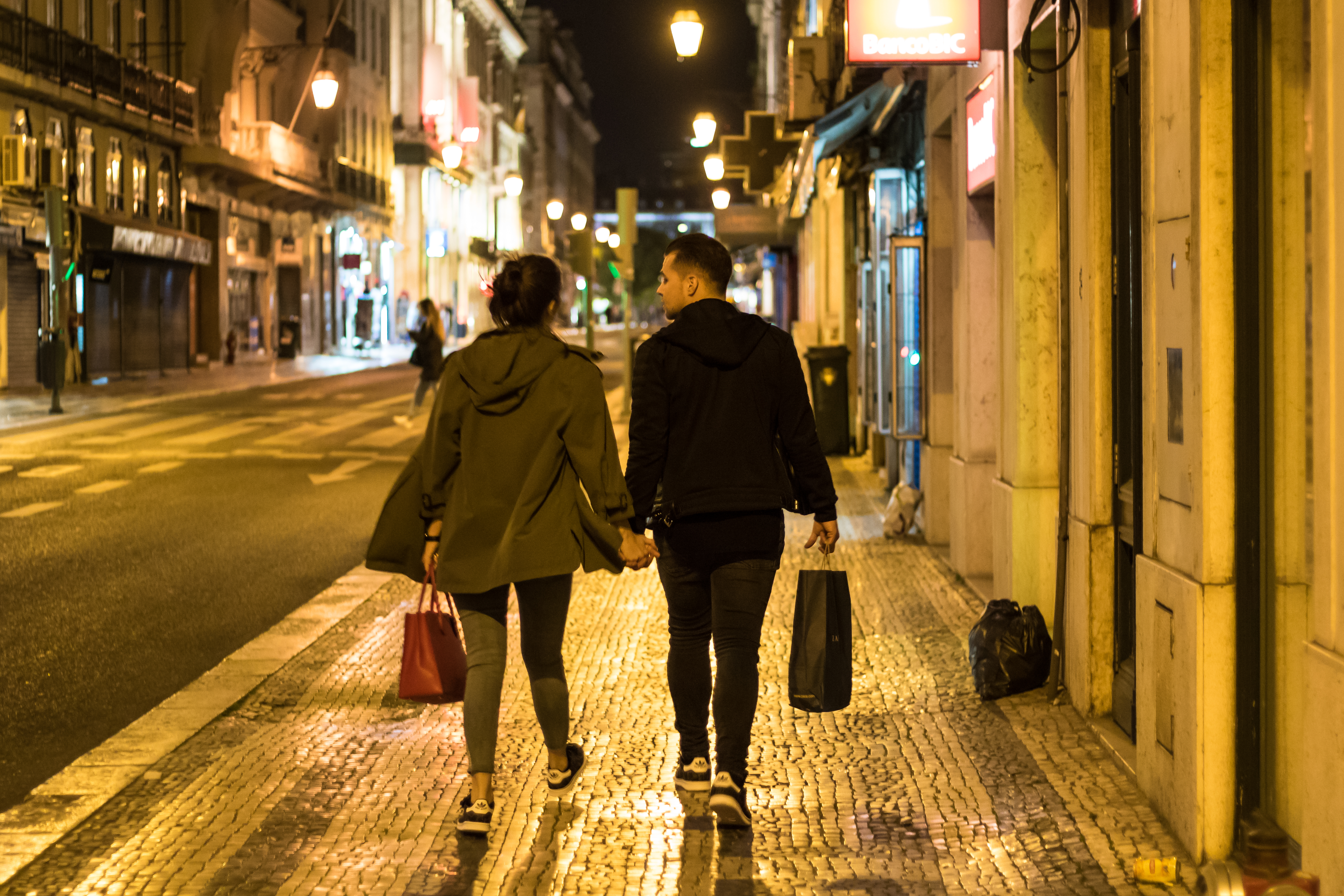
Couples holding hands in public is a common tie sign

Nearly anything can be a tie sign, whether it is an action or an object, depending on the context in which it is observed. The majority of the time, the term tie sign is directed toward romantic couples, but it can also apply to groups like families and friends. Additionally, "name-dropping" is an example a type of non-romantic tie sign wherein someone attempts to communicate to others that a relationship exists between the speaker and the person he or she has named.

=== Dependence on context ===
Morris relates that one of the difficulties associated with understanding tie signs is that almost anything can qualify as one, depending on the circumstances. For example, even though holding hands is a common tie sign, there is an obvious difference between a man and a woman holding hands as they stand on the altar at a wedding when compared to a female physician holding a male patient's hand in a doctor's office. Goffman echoes this sentiment when he says, "a tie-sign is in fact dependent on the context for its meaning."

"Liking" someone's Facebook page is an example of tie sign via social media

=== Use of tie signs in social media ===
The advent of social media has created a newer conduit for tie signs. In addition to broadcasting images of a couple exhibiting traditional tie signs like kissing, holding hands, hugging, pictures of weddings, and engagement rings, etc., social media provides the opportunity for other signals such as "liking" someone's page or tagging another person in a picture. Additionally, although observers may not witness the act of "liking" as it occurs, evidence of such actions persist on the recipient's page for others to see over time.

There is some evidence that ceasing to use social media for relational maintenance purposes could contribute to "alienation and relational de-escalation", while it would not have been a problem in the past simply because the opportunity to communicate via social media was not an option.

== Applications ==
=== Afifi and Johnson ===
Walid A. Afifi and Michelle L. Johnson researched cross-sex friendships (those between a man and a woman) and how the use of tie signs in non-romantic relationships differ from the same tie signs when they are used in romantic cross-sex relationships. For example, hugging as a greeting is an accepted tie sign for both cross-sex friendship as well as cross-sex romantic relationships. Afifi and Johnson note some differences between sexes in the meanings behind tie signs in certain circumstances. For example, women, more often than men, stated their use of tie signs was intended to "express inclusion and intimacy." Afifi and Johnson also suggest that less-than-overt tie signs are often ambiguous even with knowledge of the context and the present state of the relationship. It is for this reason that Goffman argues that a tie sign is informative in nature and not a type of communication or language that can stand on its own.

=== Goffman ===
Like Morris, Goffman's work on tie signs, copyrighted in 1971, was more descriptive than it was research-based because he was defining a new concept. In so doing, Goffman focuses on relationships between two people (dyadic), and refers to the participants as both "pegs" and "ends" that are joined in "anchored relations," as well as the way intentional and unintentional actions that are exhibited by the pair reflect the current state of their relationship. Goffman argues that tie signs are "ritual idioms" that contain information as opposed to a particular message, in large part because tie signs are often susceptible to incorrect interpretations. In turn, third-party observers tend to look for additional tie signs in order to confirm or deny their suspicions regarding the subjects they are observing. Goffman breaks tie-signs into three distinct categories:

1. Rituals: These are inward-facing tie signs between those in a relationship. For example, in a new relationship, where the parties exhibit increased attentiveness toward one another by holding hands, maintaining prolonged eye contact, etc. Ritual ties signs can be subtle or overt, but, although they may be perceptible to outsiders, they are directed inward between the participants.
2. Markers: As the name suggests, these types of tie signs are more overt and intended by at least one of the participants in a relationship to be interpreted by others that a relationship of some kind does exist.
3. Change signals: Things like weddings and births are examples of change signals. Change signals also generally involve a participant in the relationship taking a good bit for granted, or as Goffman puts it, "the taking of liberty." For example, handing a partner one's coat or purse without asking, and not giving the action a second thought, is an example of one relational "peg" demonstrating that a relationship exists with another.

=== Guerrero and Anderson ===
Laura K. Guerrero and Peter A. Andersen researched how touch avoidance informs on the various stages of romantic relationships. Guerrero and Anderson's results quite clearly suggest a marked decrease in touching between couples once their relationship reaches a "stable" stage. The authors' research does not determine whether the decrease in touching after reaching a "stable" condition is because touching is not needed as much as when the relationship is still forming, or if the need, or desire, for public touching is replaced by an increase in physical contact while in private, or by less overt communications and gestures such as knowing looks between pairs.

Guerrero and Anderson's work supports Morris' contention that tie-signs decrease in frequency and intimacy as relationships mature. Goffman refers to this trend as “taking liberty.”

Perhaps somewhat counter intuitively on its face, a lack of touching between an “anchored pair” is also a tie sign that can signal a pair's relationship is in a mature and stable stage.

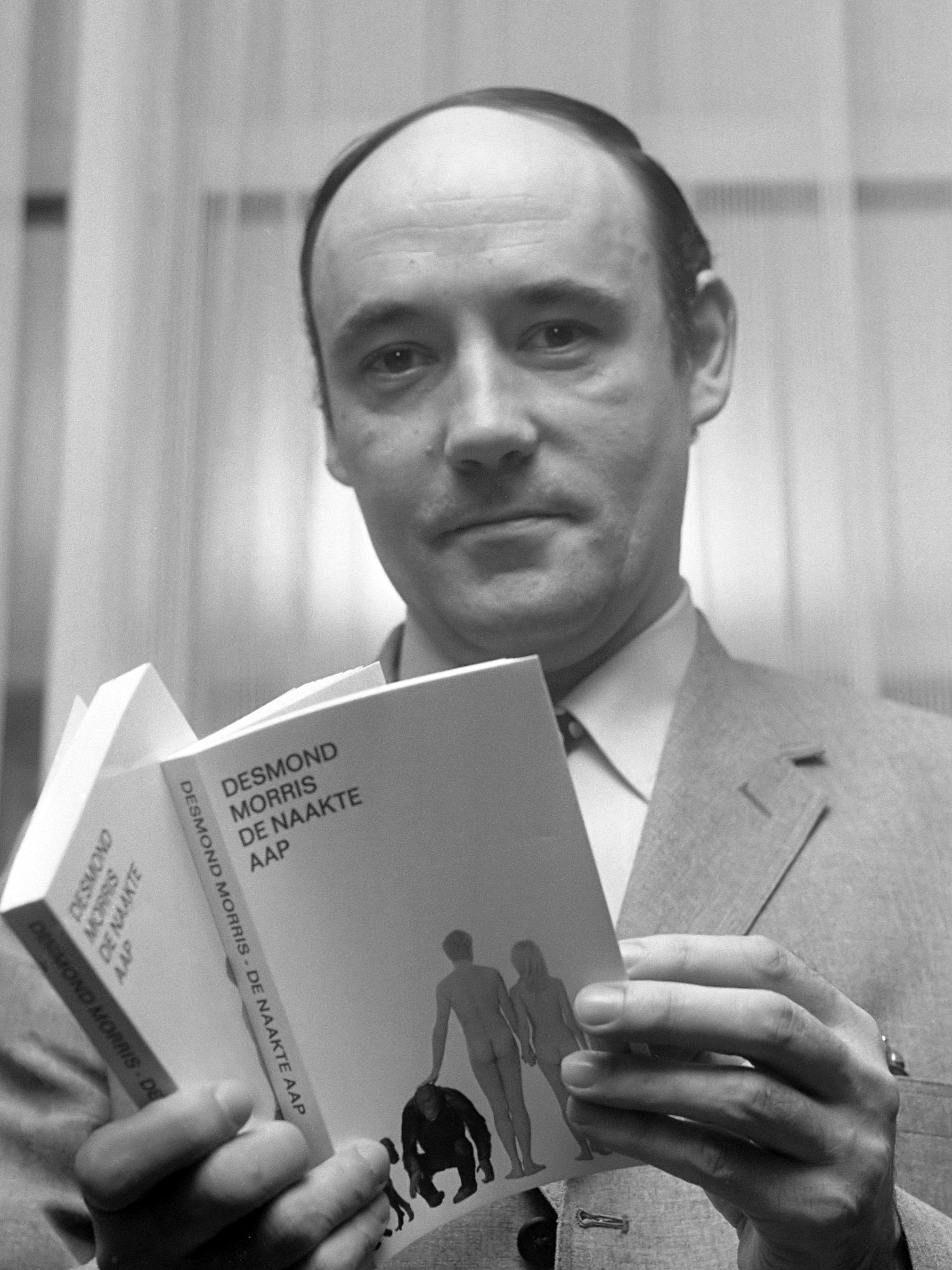
Desmond Morris

=== Morris ===
Like Goffman, Desmond Morris's work with tie signs, was more descriptive in nature as he was describing a new concept, in contrast with others' research that followed. Morris defines a tie sign as "any action which indicates the existence of a personal relationship". Additionally, he broadens and clarifies his definition by including objects such as engagement rings, family pictures, and tattoos, as well as "indirect tie signs" such as a couple sharing a dessert after dinner, and "direct ties signs" such as maintaining close proximity to one another, finishing each other's sentences, and prolonged and frequent body contact.

=== Sosik and Bazarova ===
Victoria Schwanda Sosik and Natalya Bazarova researched relational maintenance through social networking including an increasing sense of “staying in touch” and frequency of contact. Even while noting a reduction in effort, or "relational maintenance cost" required to maintain a relationship via a social media conduit, the authors argue that activity on an acquaintance's social media page still serves to signal a shared relationship. Sosik and Bazarova also argue there is a hierarchy of signals available including more personal, written comments posted either publicly or privately, “liking” something on the other person's social media page, tagging the other person when active on other pages, etc. Two differences between an in-person tie sign and a tie sign in a social media setting are first – the potentially greater size of the audience, and second – the lingering of tie signs that were generated in the past creating, in turn, a prolonged signal to any who see it that a relationship exists.

=== Tong and Walther ===
In Wright and Webb's book Computer-Mediated Communication in Personal Relationships, Stephanie Tom Tong and Joseph Walther explore whether social media activity is additive to relational maintenance between people that are not dispersed geographically and otherwise have social contact with one another. Even though people may have a relationship outside of social media, they still often choose to demonstrate to others that a relationship exists with tie signs that are delivered via social media platforms.

== Critique ==
In "Relations in Public", Goffman concedes that his review of tie-signs is focused on Western society of the time, specifically to "middle-class American[s]."
