= Institutional syndrome =

Psychology concept

In clinical and abnormal psychology, institutionalization or institutional syndrome refers to deficits or disabilities in social and life skills, which develop after a person has spent a long period living in mental hospitals, prisons or other remote institutions. In other words, individuals in institutions may be deprived (whether unintentionally or not) of independence and of responsibility, to the point that once they return to "outside life" they are often unable to manage many of its demands; it has also been argued that institutionalized individuals become psychologically more prone to mental health problems.

The term institutionalization can also be used to describe the process of committing an individual to a mental hospital or prison, or to describe institutional syndrome; thus the phrase "X is institutionalized" may mean either that X has been placed in an institution or that X is suffering the psychological effects of having been in an institution for an extended period of time.

== Background ==
In Europe and North America, the trend of putting the mentally ill into mental hospitals began as early as the 17th century, and hospitals often focused more on "restraining" or controlling inmates than on curing them, although hospital conditions improved somewhat with movements for human treatment, such as moral management. By the mid-20th century, overcrowding in institutions, the failure of institutional treatment to cure most mental illnesses, and the advent of drugs such as Thorazine prompted many hospitals to begin discharging patients in large numbers, in the beginning of the deinstitutionalization movement (the process of gradually moving people from inpatient care in mental hospitals, to outpatient care).

Deinstitutionalization did not always result in better treatment, however, and in many ways it helped reveal some of the shortcomings of institutional care, as discharged patients were often unable to take care of themselves, and many ended up homeless or in jail. In other words, many of these patients had become "institutionalized" and were unable to adjust to independent living. One of the first studies to address the issue of institutionalization directly was British psychiatrist Russell Barton's 1959 book Institutional Neurosis, which claimed that many symptoms of mental illness (specifically, psychosis) were not physical brain defects as once thought, but were consequences of institutions' "stripping" (a term probably first used in this context by Erving Goffman) away the "psychological crutches" of their patients.

Since the middle of the 20th century, the problem of institutionalization has been one of the motivating factors for the increasing popularity of deinstitutionalization and the growth of community mental health services, since some mental healthcare providers believe that institutional care may create as many problems as it solves.

== Post Institutional Autistic Syndrome ==
Post Institutional Autistic Syndrome (PIAS), also known as quasi-autism, is an autistiform syndrome originally observed in a group of eight Romanian children who lived in orphanages and suffered from severe neglect at a young age. These children had symptoms resembling autism, such as repetitive behaviors and language regression, despite not having a known history of the condition.

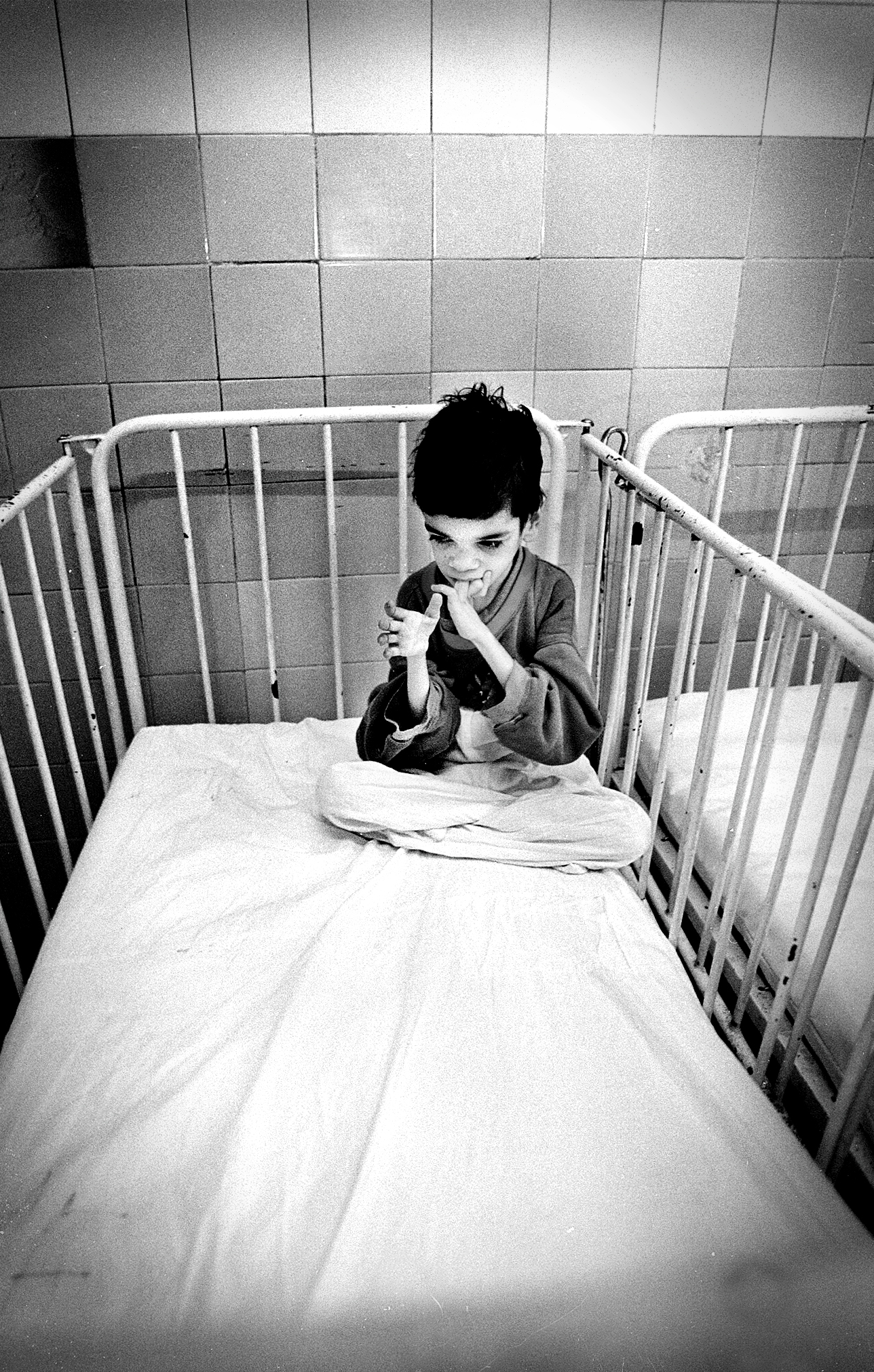
A 13-year-old Romanian orphan engaging in autistic behavior.

A follow-up study done on twenty-six adult adoptees identified as having quasi-autism found that people with quasi-autism tend to have lower IQs, social difficulties related to autism, other neurodevelopmental disorders such as ADHD, and higher rates of unemployment and lower education attainment.

== Issues for discharged patients ==
Individuals who suffer from institutional syndrome can face several kinds of difficulties upon returning to the community. The lack of independence and responsibility for patients within institutions, along with the 'depressing' and 'dehumanizing' environment, can make it difficult for patients to live and work independently. Furthermore, the experience of being in an institution may often have exacerbated individuals' illness: proponents of labeling theory claim that individuals who are socially "labeled" as mentally ill suffer stigmatization and alienation that lead to psychological damage and a lessening of self-esteem, and thus that being placed in a mental health institution can actually cause individuals to become more mentally ill.
