= Psychiatric hospital =

Hospital specializing in the treatment of serious mental disorders

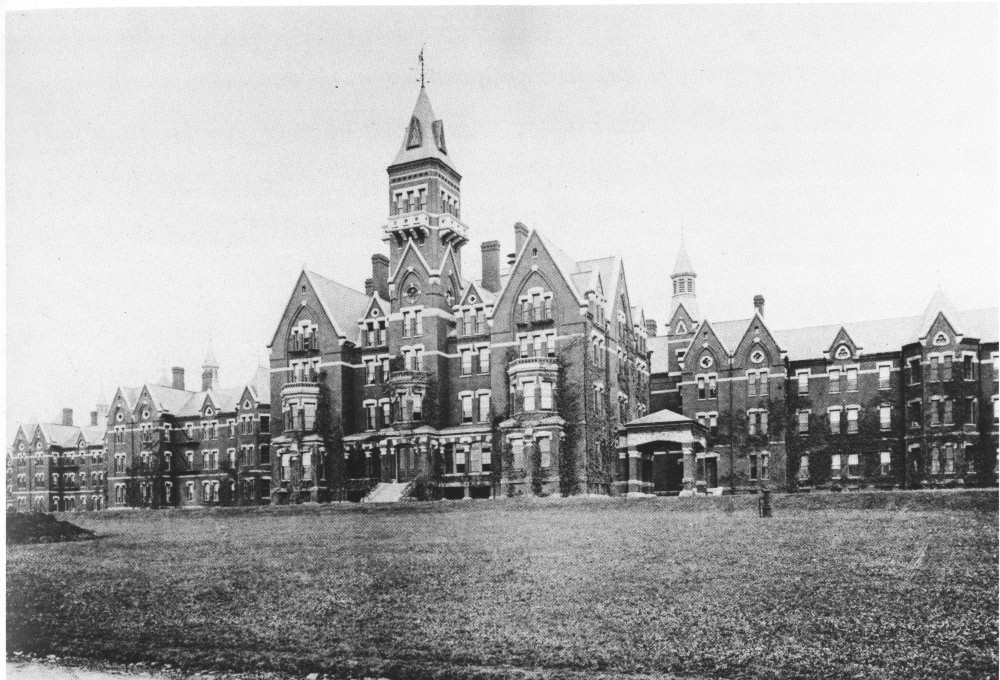
Danvers State Hospital, Danvers, Massachusetts, Kirkbride Complex, c. 1893

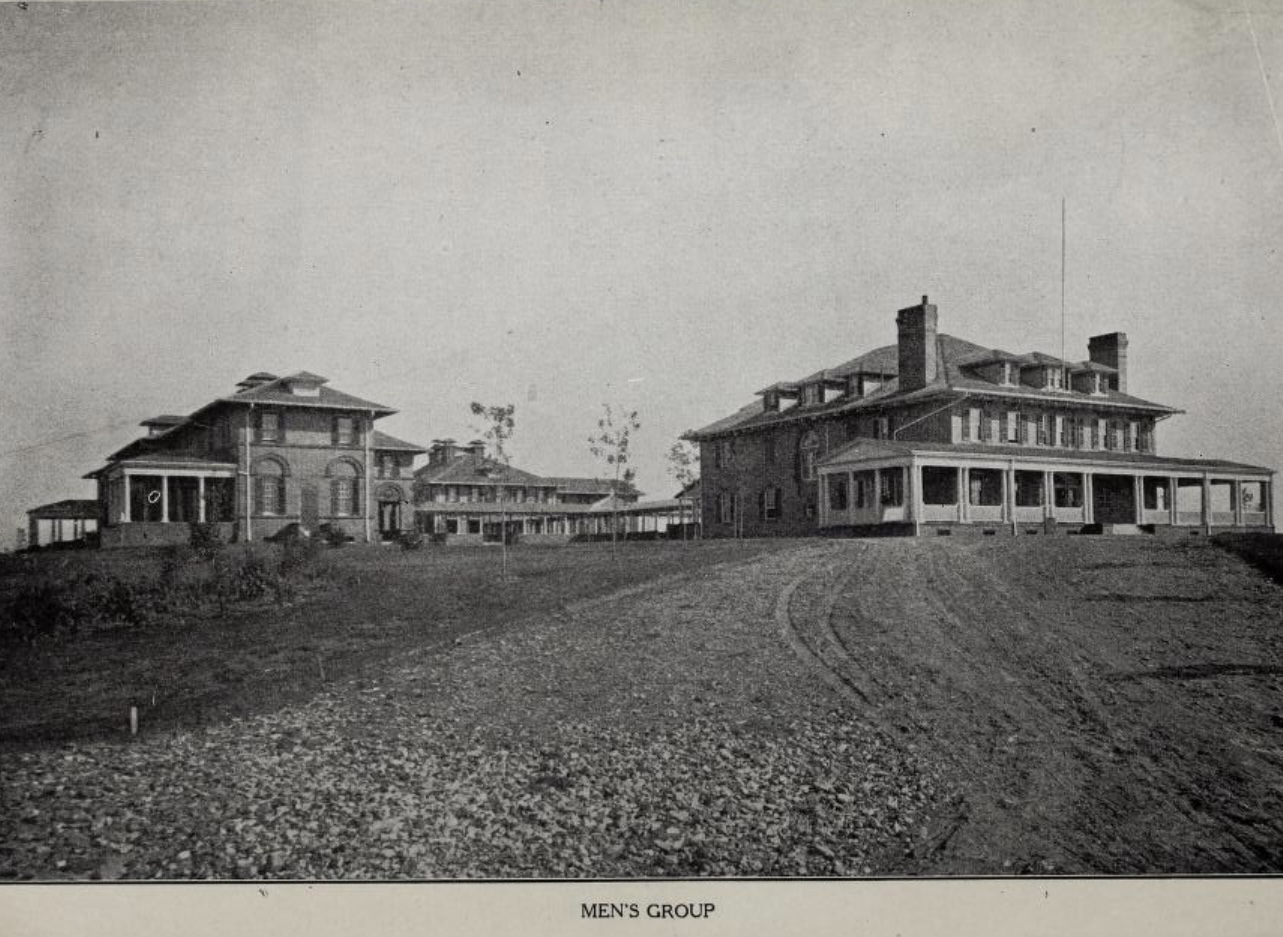
Springfield State Hospital, Sykesville, Maryland, Cottage Plan, c. 1896

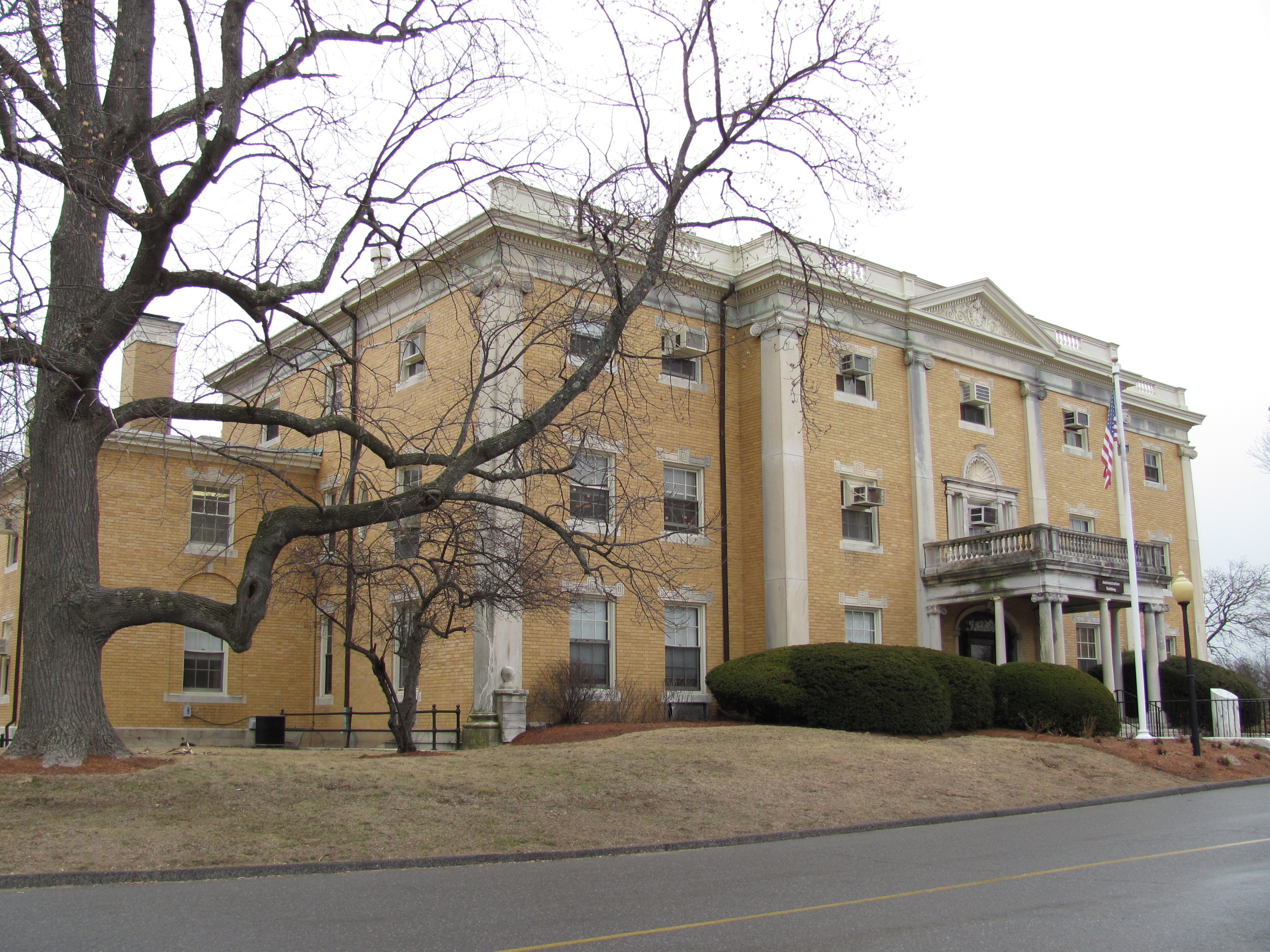
McLean Hospital's administration building in Belmont, Massachusetts; the hospital treated several notable New England residents, including Massachusetts governor Nathaniel P. Banks, musician James Taylor, and poet Anne Sexton

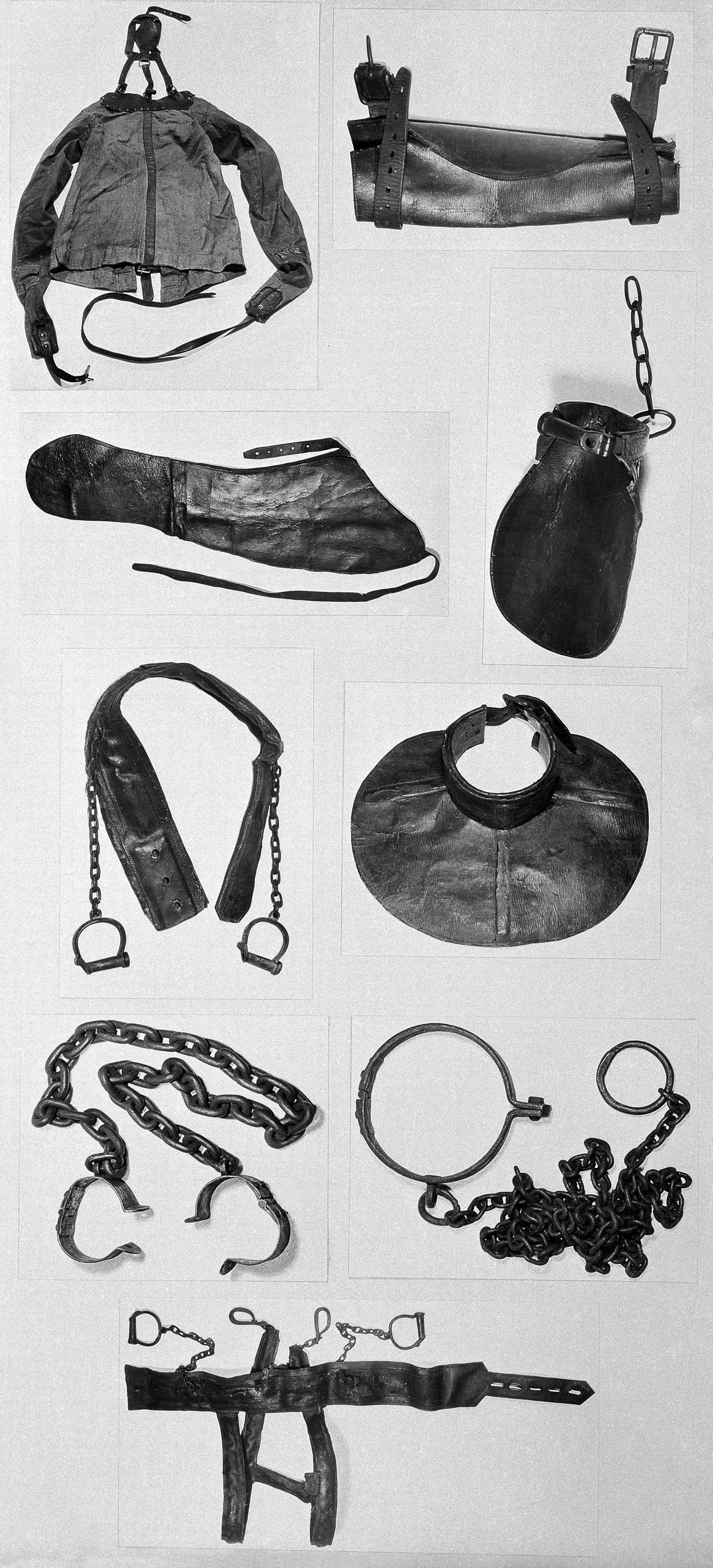
The various restraints and apparatuses pictured were utilized within Hanwell Asylum in London to restrain patients.

A psychiatric hospital, also known as a mental health hospital, a mental home, a behavioral health hospital, or an asylum, is a specialized medical facility that focuses on the treatment of severe mental disorders. These institutions cater to patients with conditions such as schizophrenia, bipolar disorder, major depressive disorder, and eating disorders, among others.

== Overview ==
Psychiatric hospitals vary considerably in size and classification. Some specialize in short-term or outpatient therapy for low-risk patients, while others provide long-term care for individuals requiring routine assistance or a controlled environment due to their psychiatric condition. Patients may choose voluntary commitment, but those deemed to pose a significant danger to themselves or others may be subject to involuntary commitment and treatment.

In general hospitals, psychiatric wards or units serve a similar purpose. Modern psychiatric hospitals have evolved from the older concept of lunatic asylums, shifting focus from mere containment and restraint to evidence-based treatments that aim to help patients function in society. Drug administration, as well as structured and one-to-one therapy (such as occupational therapy and psychotherapy) play a role in trajectories. They are the focus of most studies on forms of treatment that exist in psychiatric wards. However, because psychiatric wards are social living spaces, inpatient relationships in psychiatric wards also play a role in survival and recovery trajectories.

With successive waves of reform, and the introduction of effective evidence-based treatments, most modern psychiatric hospitals emphasize treatment, usually including a combination of psychiatric medications and psychotherapy, that assist patients in functioning in the outside world. Many countries have prohibited the use of physical restraints on patients, which includes tying psychiatric patients to their beds for days or even months at a time, though this practice still is periodically employed in the United States, India, Japan, and other countries.

== History ==
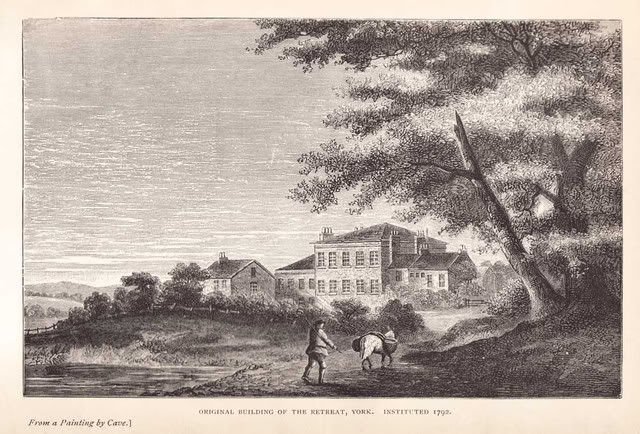
York Retreat, built in the late 18th century by William Tuke, a pioneer in moral treatment of the mentally ill

Modern psychiatric hospitals evolved from, and eventually replaced, the older lunatic asylum. Their development also entails the rise of organized institutional psychiatry.

Hospitals known as bimaristans were built in the Middle East in the early 9th century; the first was built in Baghdad under the leadership of Harun al-Rashid. While not devoted solely to patients with psychiatric disorders, bimaristans often contained wards for patients exhibiting mania or other psychological distress. Because of cultural norms encouraging people to care for their own family members, mentally ill patients would be surrendered to a bimaristan only if they demonstrated violence, incurable chronic illness, or some other extremely debilitating ailment. Psychological wards were typically enclosed by iron bars owing to the aggression of some of the patients.

The first mental hospital in Western Europe was the Hospital de los Inocentes in Valencia, Spain, organized in 1409 by Juan Gilaberto Jofré, a Mercedarian friar who had seen such hospitals during his travels in Islamic lands such as North Africa and Granada. By the middle of the 16th century, similar facilities had been established in Seville, Toledo, and Valladolid. Those admitted were typically seen as a danger to themselves or others.

In the 1700s, Philippe Pinel of the Bicêtre Hospital in France and William Tuke of York Retreat in England advocated compassionate treatment for the mentally ill, aimed not merely at confinement, but at rehabilitation. In the 19th century, institutionalisation became the typical European response to mental illness. The first public mental asylums were established in Britain; the passing of the County Asylums Act 1808 empowered magistrates to build rate-supported asylums in every county to house the many 'pauper lunatics'. Nine counties first applied, the first public asylum opening in 1812 in Nottinghamshire. In 1828, the newly appointed Commissioners in Lunacy were empowered to license and supervise private asylums. The Lunacy Act 1845 made the construction of asylums in every county compulsory with regular inspections on behalf of the Home Secretary, and required asylums to have written regulations and a resident physician. The Lunacy Act of 1845 also forced counties to provide these asylums as publicly funded establishments. By 1914, the construction of these asylums came to an abrupt stop with the beginning of World War I. At this time each English county had at least one publicly funded Pauper Asylum.

At the beginning of the 19th century, a few thousand mentally ill people were housed in a variety of disparate institutions throughout England, but by 1900 that figure had grown to about 100,000. This growth coincided with the growth of alienism, later known as psychiatry, as a medical specialty. The treatment of inmates in early lunatic asylums was sometimes brutal and focused on containment and restraint. Between 1979 and 1982 about 30 patients in psychiatric hospitals in the state of New York died, due either to seclusion or to restraint.

In the late 19th and early 20th centuries, psychiatric institutions ceased using terms such as "madness", "lunacy" or "insanity", which assumed a unitary psychosis, and began instead using more specific diagnoses, including catatonia, melancholia, and dementia praecox, which is now known as schizophrenia.

In 1961, sociologist Erving Goffman presented the theory of the "total institution," positing that asylums were managed to habituate both staff and patients to norms of conduct aimed at "institutionalizing" them, enabling the smooth operation of the asylum itself, rather than at improved health or rehabilitation. Goffman's Asylums was a key text in the rise of deinstitutionalization.

With successive waves of reform and the introduction of effective evidence-based treatments, modern psychiatric hospitals provide a primary emphasis on treatment; and further, they attempt—where possible—to help patients control their own lives in the outside world with the use of a combination of psychiatric drugs and psychotherapy. These treatments can be involuntary. Involuntary treatments are among the many psychiatric practices which are questioned by the mental patient liberation movement. The Mental Patient Liberation Movement developed between 1950 and 1960. The movement was driven by the effort to gain more rights for mental patients and ex-patients who felt their constitutional rights had been violated. These violations included unjust incarceration, drugging until incapacitation, and the removal of normal forms of communication such as mail or telephone. The movement worked towards changing the handling of deviant behavior to treat people in a more humaine manner and correcting this behavior through treatment rather than punishment. Overall, the primary objective of the movement was reforming institutional commitment procedures.

In America history in the 1980s after the "12,225,000 Acre Bill" it was emphasized that care would be given in asylums instead of housing the individuals in jails, poorhouses, or having them live on the streets. Due to the decrease over the years of psychiatric hospitals available depending on the state the availability of space and beds for new patients has drastically decreased.

In July 2022, the 988 number was created for those in America who needed mental health services so that they could have access to care and have help from anywhere or at any time. This number acts as the National Suicide Prevention Lifeline and was created to help combat the rising number of Americans who require mental health help particularly those dealing with suicidal thoughts or attempts and mental illness. 988 was created to help keep those in need from cycling endlessly between and or within emergency departments and the criminal justice system. Congress made history in 2022 by increasing support for the National Suicide Prevention Lifeline by a record amount of $77 million. The creation of this line helps prevent more people from being admitted into psychiatric hospitals by providing another outlet for immediate help and care.

== Types ==
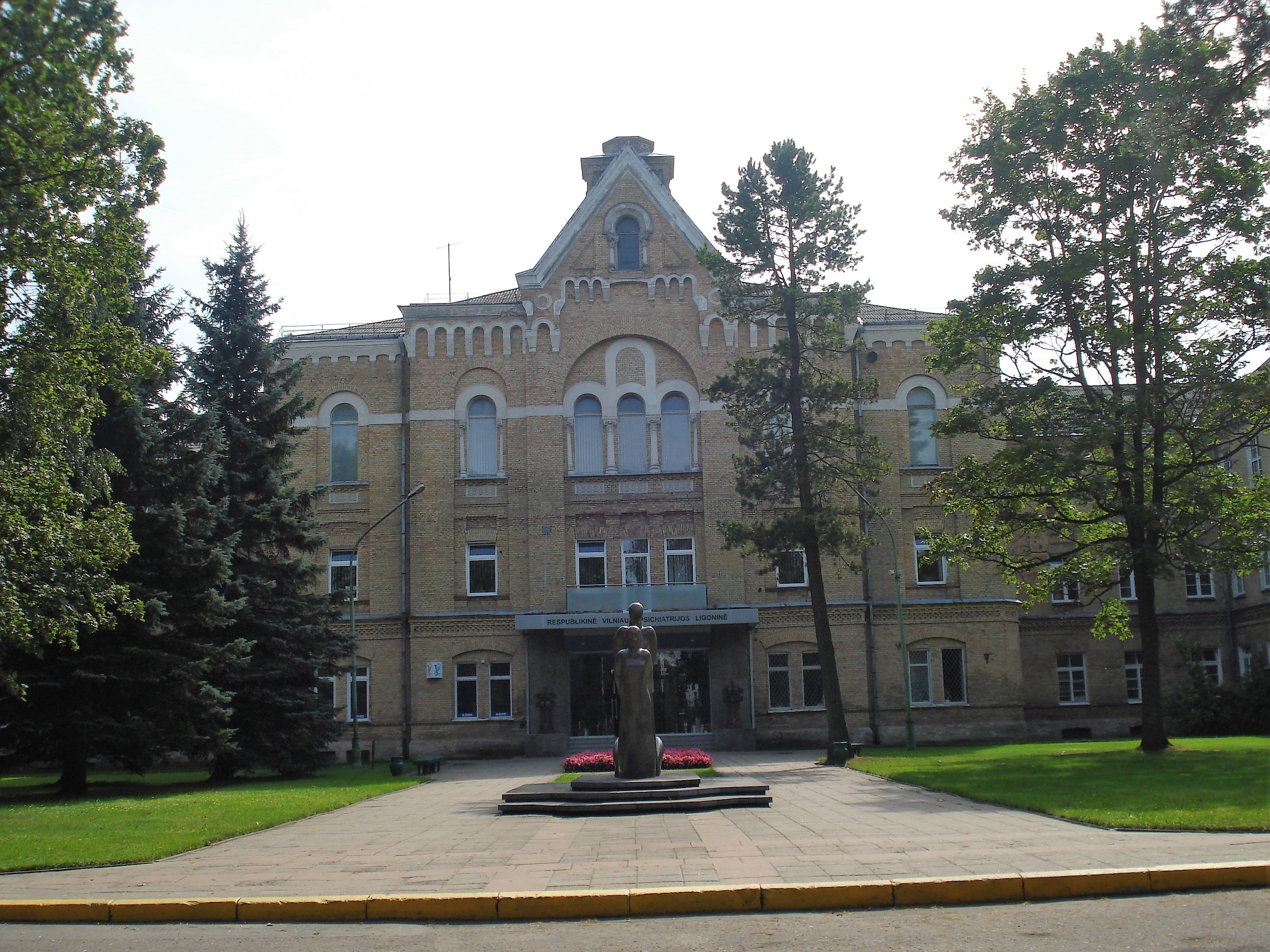
Republican Vilnius Psychiatric Hospital in Naujoji Vilnia, one of the largest health facilities in Lithuania, built in 1902

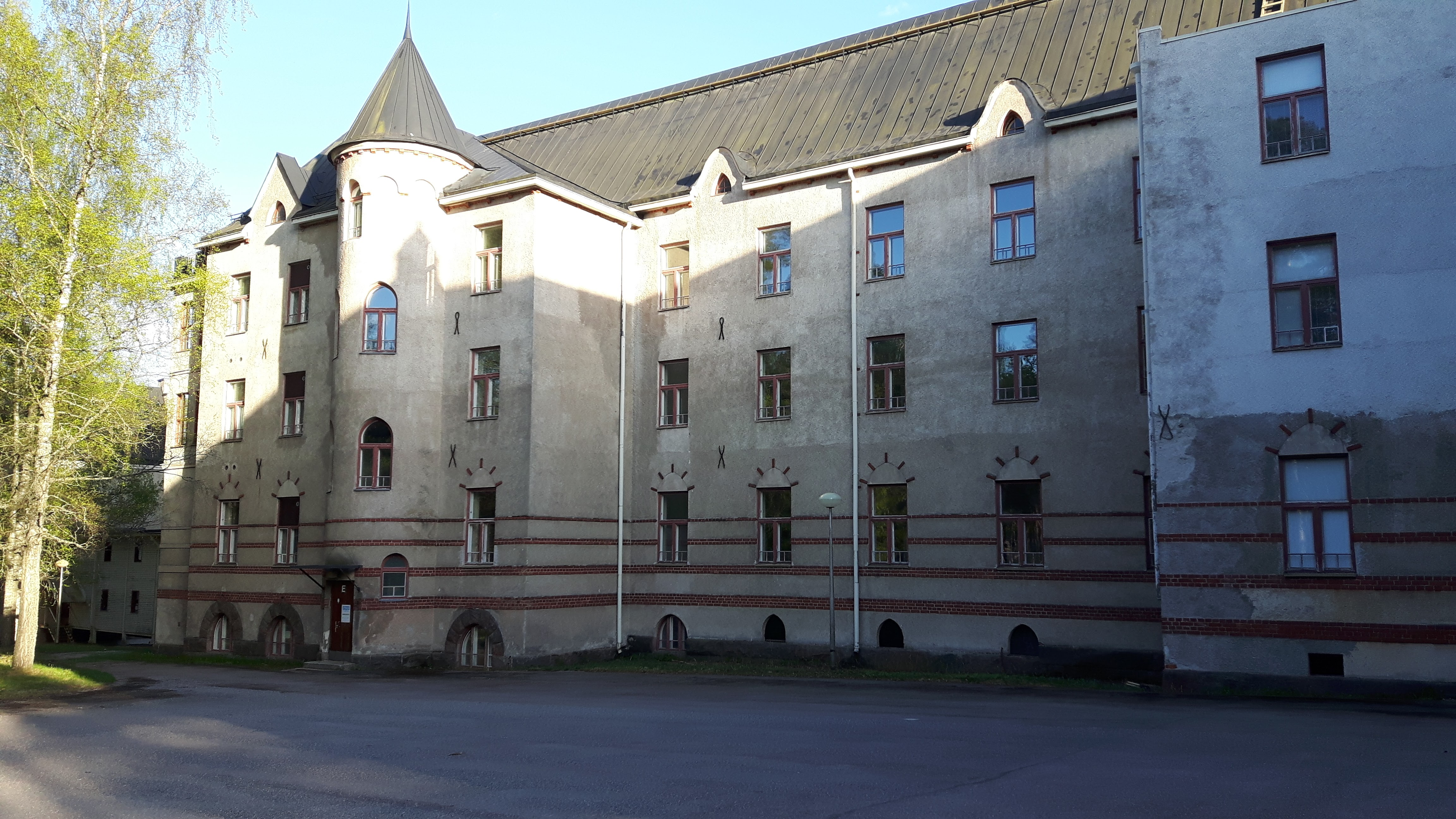
The Art Nouveau-styled Röykkä Hospital, formerly known as Nummela Sanatorium, in Röykkä, Finland

There are several different types of modern psychiatric hospitals, but all of them house people with mental illnesses of varying severity. In the United Kingdom, both crisis admissions and medium-term care are usually provided on acute admissions wards. Juvenile or youth wards in psychiatric hospitals or psychiatric wards are set aside for children or youth with mental illness. Long-term care facilities have the goal of treatment and rehabilitation within a short time-frame (two or three years). Another institution for the mentally ill is a community-based halfway house.

=== Crisis stabilization ===
In the United States, there are high acuity and low acuity crisis facilities (or Crisis Stabilization Units). High acuity crisis stabilization units serve individuals who are actively suicidal, violent, or intoxicated. Low acuity crisis facilities include peer respites, social detoxes, and other programs to serve individuals who are not actively suicidal/violent.

=== Open units ===
Open psychiatric units are not as secure as crisis stabilization units. They are not used for acutely suicidal people; instead, the focus in these units is to make life as normal as possible for patients while continuing treatment to the point where they can be discharged. Being within an open unit does not mean that the establishment has no control over a patient but more so that the patient is taking an active role in living similarly to how they would be outside of the hospital. However, patients are usually still not allowed to hold their own medications in their rooms because of the risk of an impulsive overdose. While some open units are physically unlocked, other open units still use locked entrances and exits, depending on the type of patients admitted. During the creation of open wards an emphasis was made on ensuring that when in these units a patient feels as if the hospital is their own.

=== Medium term ===
Another type of psychiatric hospital is medium term, which provides care lasting several weeks. Most drugs used for psychiatric purposes take several weeks to take effect, and the main purpose of these hospitals is to monitor the patient for the first few weeks of therapy to ensure the treatment is effective.

=== Juvenile wards ===
Juvenile wards are sections of psychiatric hospitals or psychiatric wards set aside for children with mental illness. However, there are a number of institutions specializing only in the treatment of juveniles, particularly when dealing with drug abuse, self-harm, eating disorders, anxiety, depression or other mental illnesses.

As of 2020, the statistics of mental illness among inmates in jails and juvenile wards range from 15% to 20%. Because of this, many juvenile wards and prisons have opened an inpatient mental health unit within their facility.

=== Mental Health Wards for People with Dementia ===
In the UK, people living with dementia may be admitted to a psychiatric ward when their needs become too complex or unsafe to manage at home or in a care setting. This can happen if someone becomes very distressed, frightened, or confused, or if their behaviour puts them or others at risk. Distress is often a sign that a person's needs are not being met, even if they cannot express this directly. Sometimes physical health problems—such as infections, pain, or sudden illness—can make a person much more confused or unsettled, and specialist assessment is needed to understand what is going on. The aim of an admission is to work out the underlying causes of these changes, stabilise the person's health, adjust medications if needed, and plan the best support for them going forward, including identifying the most appropriate place for them to live and receive care.

In the UK, people with dementia may be cared for on specialist dementia wards or on mixed older adult wards alongside people with other mental health needs. There is currently no strong evidence about which approach works best, or for whom.

=== Long-term care facilities ===
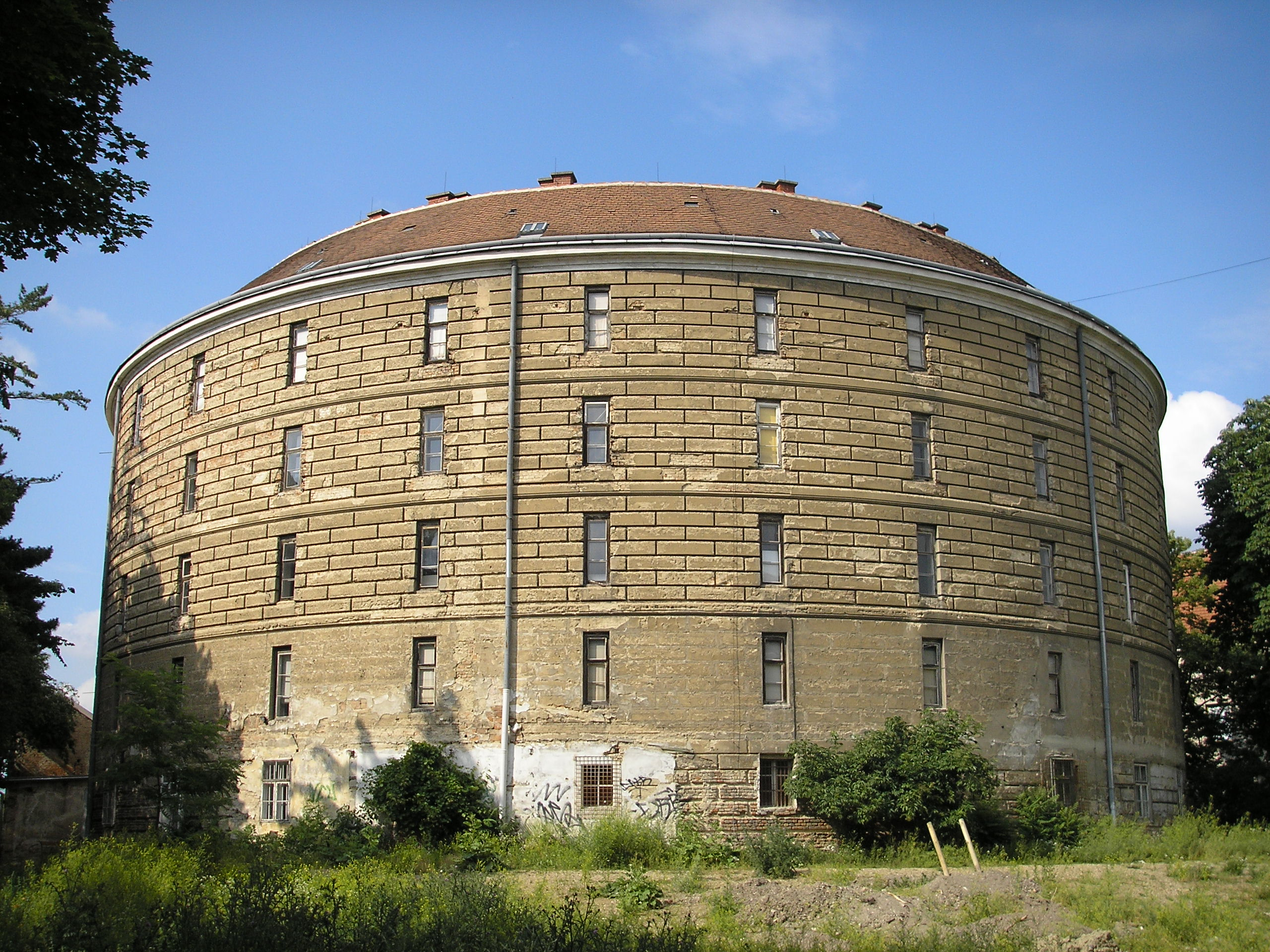
Narrenturm in Vienna, built in 1784, is named for a German language phrase, meaning "fools' tower"; the hospital was among the earliest buildings designed specifically for the mentally ill.

In the United Kingdom, long-term care facilities are now being replaced with smaller secure units, some within hospitals. Modern buildings, modern security, and being locally situated to help with reintegration into society once medication has stabilized the condition are often features of such units. Examples of this include the Three Bridges Unit at St Bernard's Hospital in West London and the John Munroe Hospital in Staffordshire. These units have the goal of treatment and rehabilitation to allow for transition back into society within a short time-frame, usually lasting two or three years. Not all patients' treatment meets this criterion, however, leading larger hospitals to retain this role.

These hospitals provide stabilization and rehabilitation for those who are actively experiencing uncontrolled symptoms of mental disorders such as depression, bipolar disorders, eating disorders, and so on.

In the United States long-term care facilities are used for individuals with severe and continuous mental health struggles. These hospitals provide a different form of care compared to other psychiatric hospitals; this type is designed to provide comprehensive care over an extended period of time, higher level of support and care, as well as heavy monitoring of patients. Within these facilities the care can be better adapted to best fit each individual patient, this allows for a more patient centered focus on the form of care they are receiving.

=== Halfway houses ===
One type of institution for the mentally ill is a community-based halfway house. These facilities provide assisted living for an extended period of time for patients with mental illnesses, and they often aid in the transition to self-sufficiency. These institutions are considered to be one of the most important parts of a mental health system by many psychiatrists, although some localities lack sufficient funding.

=== Political imprisonment ===
In some countries, the mental institution may be used for the incarceration of political prisoners as a form of punishment. One notable historical example was the use of punitive psychiatry in the Soviet Union and other dictatorships. .

=== Secure units ===
In the United Kingdom, criminal courts or the Home Secretary can, under various sections of the Mental Health Act, order the detention of offenders in a psychiatric hospital, but the term "criminally insane" is no longer legally or medically recognized. Secure psychiatric units exist in all regions of the UK for this purpose; in addition, there are a few specialist hospitals which offer treatment with high levels of security. These facilities are divided into three main categories: High, Medium and Low Secure. Although the phrase "Maximum Secure" is often used in the media, there is no such classification. "Local Secure" is a common misnomer for Low Secure units, as patients are often detained there by local criminal courts for psychiatric assessment before sentencing.

Run by the National Health Service, these facilities which provide psychiatric assessments can also provide treatment and accommodation in a safe hospital environment which prevents absconding. Thus there is far less risk of patients harming themselves or others. In Dublin, the Central Mental Hospital performs a similar function.

=== Community hospital utilization ===
Community hospitals across the United States regularly discharge mental health patients, who are then typically referred to out-patient treatment and therapy. A study of community hospital discharge data from 2003 to 2011, however, found that mental health hospitalizations had increased for both children and adults. Compared to other hospital utilization, mental health discharges for children were the lowest while the most rapidly increasing hospitalizations were for adults under 64. Some units have been opened to provide therapeutically enhanced Treatment, a subcategory to the three main hospital unit types.

In the UK, high security hospitals exist, including Ashworth Hospital in Merseyside, Broadmoor Hospital in Crowthorne, Rampton Secure Hospital in Retford, and the State Hospital in Carstairs, Scotland. In Northern Ireland, the Isle of Man, and the Channel Islands, medium and low secure units exist but high secure units on the UK mainland are used for patients who qualify for the treatment under the Out of Area (Off-Island Placements) Referrals provision of the Mental Health Act 1983. Among the three unit types, medium secure facilities are the most prevalent in the UK. As of 2009, there were 27 women-only units in England. Irish units include those at prisons in Portlaise, Castelrea, and Cork.

== Criticism ==
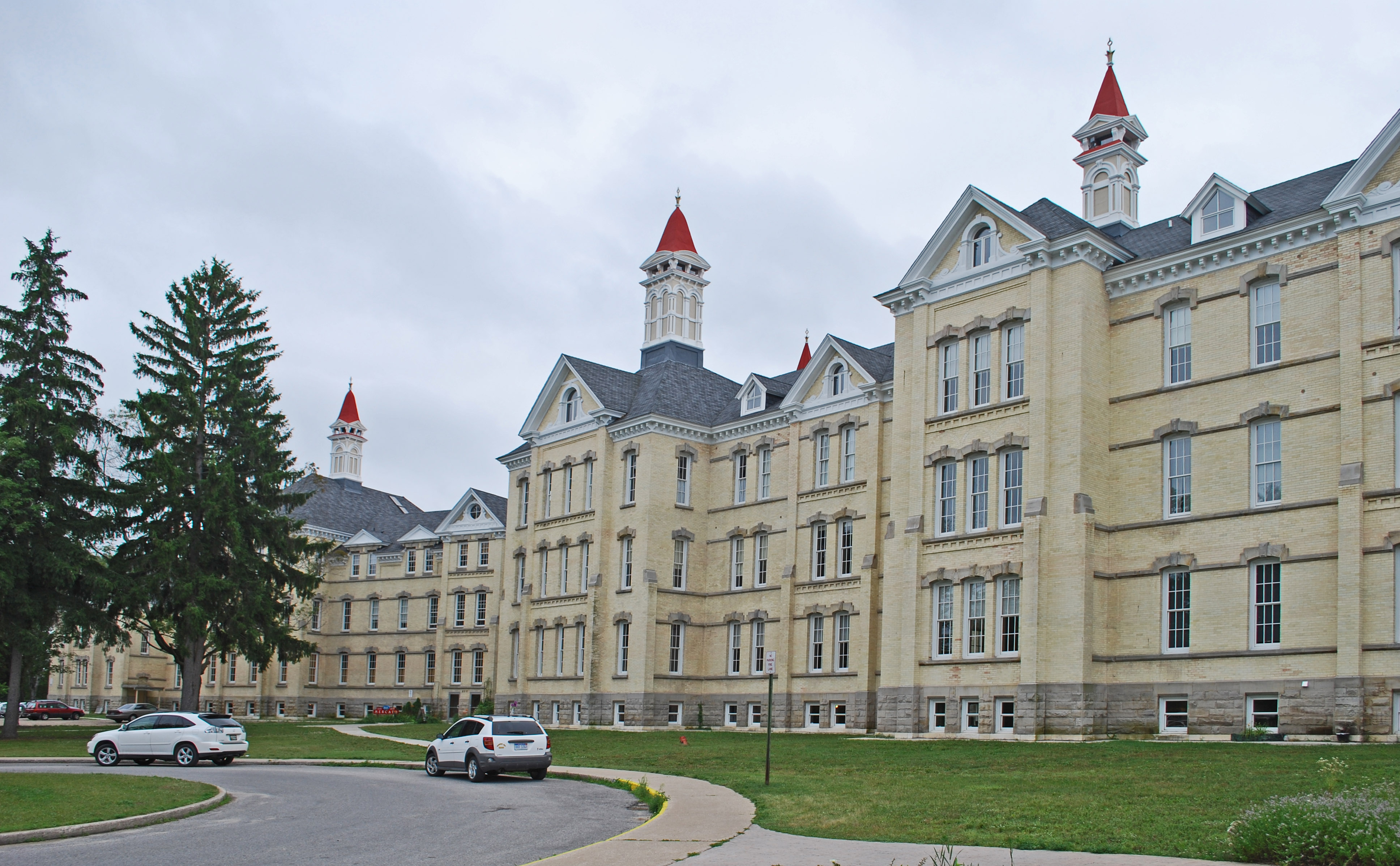
Traverse City State Hospital in Traverse City, Michigan, U.S., in operation from 1881 to 1989

Psychiatrist Thomas Szasz in Hungary has argued that psychiatric hospitals are like prisons unlike other kinds of hospitals, and that psychiatrists who coerce people (into treatment or involuntary commitment) function as judges and jailers, not physicians. Historian Michel Foucault is widely known for his comprehensive critique of the use and abuse of the mental hospital system in Madness and Civilization. He argued that Tuke and Pinel's asylum was a symbolic recreation of the condition of a child under a bourgeois family. It was a microcosm symbolizing the massive structures of bourgeois society and its values: relations of Family–Children (paternal authority), Fault–Punishment (immediate justice), Madness–Disorder (social and moral order). Within the limitations of psychiatric hospitals during this period, individuals were mainly admitted due to social nonconformity, vulnerabilities, and social control. Asylums aimed to manage those deemed socially disruptive or considered "inconvenient." This group primarily consisted of women, impoverished people, or those with language barriers.

Erving Goffman coined the term "total institution" for mental hospitals and similar places which took over and confined a person's whole life. Goffman placed psychiatric hospitals in the same category as concentration camps, prisons, military organizations, orphanages, and monasteries. In his book Asylums Goffman describes how the institutionalisation process socialises people into the role of a good patient, someone "dull, harmless and inconspicuous"; in turn, it reinforces notions of chronicity in severe mental illness. The Rosenhan experiment of 1973 demonstrated the difficulty of distinguishing sane patients from insane patients.

Rosenhan's research questions the reliability of psychiatric diagnosis by showing how unstable the concept of insanity can be. In his pseudopatient experiment, Rosenhan demonstrated that once someone is labeled with schizophrenia, staff interpret all their behaviors through that diagnostic perspective. This underscores how institutional settings and biases influence mental health definitions. Interestingly, Rosenhan's work revealed that real patients often recognized their own sanity more accurately than trained staff. This vulnerability in psychiatric authority raises the key issue of who holds the power to define sanity in institutional contexts and how this label affects the treatment individuals receive.

Once someone was labeled as "insane," they were placed in environments that were often harsh, overcrowded, and neglectful. Patients were typically confined to small, prison-like cells and frequently subjected to verbal and physical abuse by staff. These dehumanizing conditions extended to unsanitary living spaces and poor or rotten food, emphasizing the neglect characteristic of early institutional care. Accounts from later periods reveal that such conditions persisted into the mid-20th century, with routine abuse, long-term confinement, and lack of stimulation only coming to light through scandals and medical revelations.

Franco Basaglia, a leading psychiatrist who inspired and planned the psychiatric reform in Italy, also defined the mental hospital as an oppressive, locked, and total institution in which prison-like, punitive rules are applied, in order to gradually eliminate its own contents. Patients, doctors and nurses are all subjected (at different levels) to the same process of institutionalism. American psychiatrist Loren Mosher noticed that the psychiatric institution itself gave him master classes in the art of the "total institution": labeling, unnecessary dependency, the induction and perpetuation of powerlessness, the degradation ceremony, authoritarianism, and the primacy of institutional needs over the patients, whom it was ostensibly there to serve.

The anti-psychiatry movement coming to the fore in the 1960s has opposed many of the practices, conditions, or existence of mental hospitals; due to the extreme conditions in them. The psychiatric consumer/survivor movement has often objected to or campaigned against conditions in mental hospitals or their use, voluntarily or involuntarily. The mental patient liberation movement emphatically opposes involuntary treatment but it generally does not object to any psychiatric treatments that are consensual, provided that both parties can withdraw consent at any time.

While there is a lot of criticism to the set up and the form of care psychiatric hospitals provide, there is the more prominent issue of stigmatization from other individuals and the communities surrounding these hospitals. There has been an increase in the stigmatization towards individuals who receive professional mental health care in psychiatric hospitals. Stigmatization has a major impact on not only the patients in these hospitals but also the clients of so-called alternative settings. Having this stigma can cause future patients and individuals who need this care to be more hesitant to get the care due to the fear of future judgement and being a victim of this stigmatization. For example, Janna Herron, a previous patient at a psychiatric institution argues that psychiatric institutions are harsh and inhumane to patients and only cut them off from the outside world. She also says that psychiatric patients are stigmatized and that nobody wants to talk about the issues patients face.

Some other criticism that can occur is by peers. This can have a direct impact on the patients. This alone can cause them not to feel as if they can share or seek help from a professional mental health provider.

Historical criticism of psychiatric hospitals reveals that during the nineteenth and early twentieth centuries, women were admitted at disproportionately high rates. Women who diverged from traditional domestic roles, exhibited emotional expressiveness, independence, or were deemed unmanageable were quickly labeled insane and institutionalized without thorough assessment. Often, these women were hospitalized due to social nonconformity, issues like marital conflicts, poverty, or language difficulties, rather than genuine mental illness. These patterns highlight how psychiatric institutions served not only as medical tools but also as mechanisms of social control, with the pathologization of women's behavior influenced by a male-dominated authority. This dynamic resulted in a higher rate of institutionalization among women whose actions challenged gender norms.

A pattern of social regulation is evident in the way individuals engaging in same-sex relationships are treated, with sexuality often seen as a psychiatric disorder rather than a valid aspect of identity. Between 1910 and 1935, society regarded homosexuality as a fluid identity that could be altered through treatment. Due to this perception of same-sex relations, families and clinicians often chose institutional care for individuals experiencing conflicts with their same-sex desires. Many men were committed due to family pressure, reflecting how homosexuality, like women's nonconformity, was seen as a deviation needing medical intervention. Early psychiatric institutions played a role in the historical mistreatment of LGBTQ people by pathologizing their identities and reinforcing the notion that deviation from heterosexual norms indicated mental illness, subjecting them to harsh and neglectful treatment in asylums.

=== Undercover journalism ===
Alongside the 1973 academic investigation by Rosenhan and other similar experiments, several journalists have been willingly admitted to hospitals in order to conduct undercover journalism. These include:

- Julius Chambers, who visited Bloomingdale Insane Asylum in 1872, leading to the 1876 book A Mad World and Its Inhabitants.
- Nellie Bly, who admitted herself to a mental institution in 1887, leading to the work Ten Days in a Mad-House.
- Frank Smith in 1935 admitted himself into a Kankakee hospital, leading to the articles "Seven days in the Madhouse" in the Chicago Daily Times.
- Michael Mok, who investigated similarly in New York 1961, winning the Lasker prize.
- Frank Sutherland, who received coaching from a psychiatrist in order to accurately feign symptoms, and spent 31 days in late 1973 to early 1974, leading to a series of articles in the Nashville Tennessean.
- Betty Wells, who investigated in 1974, with the articles titled "A Trip into Darkness" for the Wichita Eagle.

Undercover journalism has played a role in highlighting issues in psychiatric care and advocating for people with mental illness. These investigations revealed conditions that included instances of abuse, neglect, and dehumanization. By reporting on social control, physical abuse, and the overrepresentation of marginalized communities in admissions, the coverage questioned the fairness of current institutional practices. This journalistic work contributed to changing public perceptions, supporting advocacy for patient rights, and promoting discussions around deinstitutionalization and improvements in psychiatric treatment.

== Criteria ==
When looking at the criteria for individuals who may need to be admitted into a psychiatric hospitals there are six things that are looked at to indicate the need for the hospital. These include mental status, self-care ability, responsible parties available, patients' effect on environment, danger potential and the treatment prognosis. The need for inpatient care can change depending on the individual and the presenting issues that need to be addressed. Some other criteria can be if the individual is an immediate threat to themselves or others, this can be presented in something called a suicidal ideation. Some of the disorders or signs of someone who is in need of a psychiatric hospital are: major depressive disorder, suicidal ideation, schizophrenia, eating disorder, post-traumatic stress disorder, and many others.

== See also ==
- Clifford W. Beers
- Deinstitutionalisation
- Domingo Cabred
- History of mental disorders
- History of psychiatric institutions
- Institutional syndrome
- Kirkbride Plan
- Mental health law
- MindFreedom International
- New Freedom Commission on Mental Health
- Psychiatric survivors movement
- Political abuse of psychiatry in the Soviet Union
- Salutogenesis, a best-practice methodology for the design of psychiatric facilities
- Treatment Advocacy Center, involuntary treatment proponent group
- Loir-et-Cher Departmental Asylum
