= Sherri Cavan =

American sociologist, author, and sculptor

Sherri Cavan (March 13, 1938 – February 20, 2016) was an American sociologist, professor, author, and artist.

== Career ==
Cavan served on the faculty of San Francisco State University from the 1960s through the 1980s. She was a doctoral student of Erving Goffman at University of California, Berkeley and later became part of a group of faculty that promoted ethnography in sociological studies. She also served as co-director of the Erving Goffman Archives at University of Nevada, Las Vegas Center for Democratic Culture.

She authored several books and numerous articles that applied principles of sociology to popular culture, including "Liquor License: An Ethnography of Bar Behavior," published in 1966, "Hippies of the Haight," published in 1972, and "Twentieth Century Gothic: America's Nixon," published in 1979.

Liquor License describes social interactions in bars and pubs from a scientific, sociological perspective. It draws on concepts relating to behavior in public places that were made popular by Erving Goffman, one of her committee members at University of California, Berkeley, but focusing specifically on social interactions in the American tavern and pub. According to a review in American Anthropologist,

"For persons conversant with bar behavior, the book may impart an eerie, fascinating, Goffmanesque feeling suggesting, "I knew it all the time; I just didn't think of it that way before" … The trouble with the book is that there is simply not enough of it."

Hippies of the Haight was a groundbreaking ethnographic analysis of the hippie movement, which she witnessed as it began to form in her San Francisco neighborhood of Haight Ashbury after she had already lived there for some time. According to an interview with Cavan in 2013:

"I ended up living in the Haight Ashbury. Son of a gun, who would have believed that there were all these hippies, in my own neighborhood, and they weren’t there when I moved there. I always describe it like a botanist, you look in your backyard, and here is this strange plant."

Cavan was one of the few women sociologists at a time when the field was dominated by men, leading to her relative obscurity among modern American sociologists.

"Like most women sociologists, Sherri Cavan is missing from the field’s public history and its canon. […] a prolific author of books and articles, [she] falls into what sociologist Wei Luo and his colleagues dub the “erased" category of productive women scholars who have been dropped from the discipline's history."

— Janice M. Irvine, "Sherri Cavan: Outsider Women of Sociology", Marginal People in Deviant Places (2022)

Cavan's 1979 book Twentieth Century Gothic made her an early authority on the prospect of Richard Nixon's inevitable return to the public eye. In 1987 she spoke on a panel at the Richard Nixon Symposium, hosted by Hofstra University, which was concerned with "how the Nixon legacy had changed since he left office." Alongside former White House aides including John Ehrlichman, she delivered a sharply critical assessment of the implications of his political rehabilitation.
