= James Patrick =

James or Jim Patrick may refer to:

== Sportspeople ==
- James Patrick (ice hockey) (born 1963), former ice hockey defenceman
- James Patrick (Canadian football) (born 1982), Canadian football cornerback

== Others ==
- James Patrick (British Army officer), Irish Guards officer and equerry
- James Patrick (shipowner) (1880–1945), founder of an Australian shipping firm
- James Patrick (sociologist) (born 1940s), pseudonym of a Scottish sociologist
- James McIntosh Patrick (1907–1998), Scottish etcher and painter
- Jim Patrick (born 1945), Idaho politician
- Jim Patrick (audiologist), Australian audiologist and cochlear implant engineer, 2021 NSW Scientist of the Year
