= Covert participant observation =

Method in social science research

Covert participant observation is a method in social science research. Participant observation involves a researcher joining the group they are studying, and in the case of covert observation, the researcher's status is not made known to the group.

Observation involves participating in activities over a period of time and therefore becoming an accepted part of the group. An example is the research for A Glasgow Gang Observed. A 26-year-old schoolmaster at a Scottish Reformatory (ListD) school, who called himself James Patrick, went undercover with the help of one of his pupils to study the often violent behaviour of the teenagers in a gang in Glasgow. He concealed all his personal information for his own safety.

== Advantages and disadvantages ==
A practical advantage of the method is that no prior knowledge of social incidence is required. On the other hand, it could be difficult to gain access and maintain cover in the group. Another disadvantage is the potential difficulty of taking part in the activity and observing simultaneously. In A Glasgow Gang Observed James Patrick would have taken part in the deviant behaviour he was studying. An ethical disadvantage is that the researcher has to deceive the group and invade their privacy; and this could end in mental or physical harm. There is a validity advantage since the researcher is more likely to observe natural behaviour representative of a small social group. However, the method is unlikely to get consistent or comparable results on a large scale, since the data gathered is qualitative and there is variation in group dynamics of different small groups. Bibliography,"A Glasgow Gang Observed", James Patrick, Eyre Methuen 1973
