= Total institution =

Place where a lot of people (in the same condition) live together, cut off from society

A total institution or residential institution is a facility of work and residence in which a number of similarly situated people, cut off from the wider community for a considerable time, together lead an enclosed, formally administered, and regimented round of life. Total institutions are hybrids of social organization and residential community. Privacy and civil liberties are limited or non-existent in total institutions, as all aspects of life including sleep, play, and work, are conducted in the same place, under the same absolute authority. The concept is mostly associated with the work of sociologist Erving Goffman.

== Etymology ==
The term is sometimes credited as having been coined and defined by Canadian sociologist Erving Goffman in his paper "On the Characteristics of Total Institutions", presented in April 1957 at the Walter Reed Institute's Symposium on Preventive and Social Psychiatry. An expanded version appeared in Donald Cressey's collection, The Prison, and was reprinted in Goffman's 1961 collection, Asylums. Fine and Manning, however, note that Goffman heard the term in lectures by Everett Hughes (likely during the late-1940s seminar, "Work and Occupations"). Regardless of whether Goffman coined the term, he can be credited with popularizing it. The totality of total institutions varies according to the type of institution, guiding ideology, etc.

== Typology ==
Total institutions are divided by Goffman into five different types:

1. institutions established to care for people felt to be both harmless and incapable due to age, disability, lack of income, etc: orphanages, poor houses, homeless shelters, rehab facilities, most types of group homes and nursing homes.
2. places established to care for people felt to be incapable of looking after themselves and a threat to the community, albeit an unintended one: leprosariums, mental hospitals, certain types of group homes, and tuberculosis sanitariums.
3. institutions organised to protect the community against and punish what are felt to be intentional dangers to it, with the welfare of the people thus sequestered not the immediate issue: concentration camps, P.O.W. camps, penitentiaries, and jails.
4. institutions purportedly established to better pursue some worklike tasks and justifying themselves only on these instrumental grounds: colonial compounds, man camps, boarding schools, ships, army barracks, space stations and large mansions from the point of view of those who live in the servants' quarters.
5. establishments designed as retreats from the world even while often serving also as training stations for the religious; examples are convents, abbeys, monasteries, and other cloisters.

David Rothman states that "historians have confirmed the validity of Goffman's concept of 'total institutions' which minimizes the differences in formal mission to establish a unity of design and structure."

In Discipline and Punish, Michel Foucault discussed total institutions in the language of complete and austere institutions.

=== Nursing homes ===
According to S. Lammers and A. Verhey, some 80 percent of Americans will ultimately die not in their home, but in a total institution.

In recent decade the nursing home industry has quickly extended, and particular regions of the country have become huge territorial nursing homes where we hide the aged and they hide from us. Long before their death, they are buried in the folds of the total institution, hidden, out of sight and out of mind. In the United States, dying in a total institution has become a common experience.

=== Tourism ===
Sociologists have pointed out that tourist venues, such as cruise ships, are acquiring many of the characteristics of total institutions. Tourists may not be aware that they are being controlled, even constrained, but the environment has been designed to subtly manipulate the behavior of patrons. These examples differ from the traditional examples in that the influence is short term.

== See also ==
- Concentration camp
- Conscription
- Disciplinary institution
- Mental asylum
- Psych ward
- Workhouse
- Totalitarianism
- Transinstitutionalisation
