= Nonperson treatment =

Not acknowledging another person's presence

Nonperson treatment is a level of social interaction at which one person does not acknowledge the presence of another person. The concept was introduced by American sociologist, social psychologist Erving Goffman. For comparison, Goffman describes two other levels of social interaction: " civil inattention", whereby some form of subtle, implicit acknowledgement is provided, and "encounter", which is an explicit engagement.

Goffman gives examples of people commonly subject to nonperson treatment: "... it may be seen in our society in the way we sometimes treat children, servants, Negroes, and mental patients." Panhandlers are another category of people who receive the nonperson treatment. Goffman, in his 1953 Ph.D. thesis writes:

We are familiar with treatment of a person as virtually absent in many situations. Domestic servants and waitresses, in certain circumstances, are treated as not present and act, ritually speaking, as if they were not present. The young and, increasingly, the very old, may be discussed “to their faces” in the tone we would ordinarily use for a person only if he were not present. Mental patients are often given similar non-person treatment. Finally, there is an increasing number of technical personnel who are given this status (and take the non-person alignment) at formally organized interplays. Here we refer to stenographers, cameramen, reporters, plainclothes guards, and technicians of all kinds.

Following the theory of Goffman for nonperson treatment as a technique of diminishing the social status of a person, Roscoe Scarborough applies it to inequal treatment of contingent faculty in American higher education and Jon Frederickson and James F. Rooney do the same for free-lance musicians.

Chapter 7 of the book Absentees: On Variously Missing Persons by Daniel Heller-Roazen contains a discussion of Erving Goffman’s work on social participation and exclusion, in particular, the concept of "nonperson treatment".

== See also ==
- capitis deminutio
- civil death
- unperson from Nineteen Eighty-Four: a person who has been executed or has fallen out of favor; whose entire history has been erased.
- Personhood
- Untouchability
