= James Patrick (sociologist) =

James Patrick (born c. 1943) is the pseudonym of a Scottish sociologist, which he used to publish a book A Glasgow Gang Observed. It attracted some attention in Scotland when it was published in 1973. It was based on research he had done in 1966, when he was aged 23.

At that time he was working as a doctor in an approved school, a Scottish reformatory. One gang member in the school, "Tim Malloy" (born 1950, also a pseudonym and a generic term for a Glasgow Catholic), agreed to infiltrate him into his gang in Maryhill in Glasgow. Patrick spent four months as a gang member, observing their behaviour.

A Glasgow Gang Observed was re-published in 2012 and 2013. He wrote a short preface for the 2013 edition, which clarified a few issues, although he continued to use his pseudonym.

== Books ==
- A Glasgow Gang Observed. London: Eyre Methuen, 1973. ISBN 9780413302601.
  - Second edition. Castle Douglas, Scotland: Neil Wilson, 2012. ISBN 9781906000080.
  - Third Revised edition. Castle Douglas, Scotland: Neil Wilson, 2013. ISBN 978-1-906000-39-4. With a new preface by Patrick.

== See also ==
- Covert participant observation
- Gangs in the United Kingdom § Glasgow
