= Erving Goffman =

Canadian-American sociologist (1922–1982)

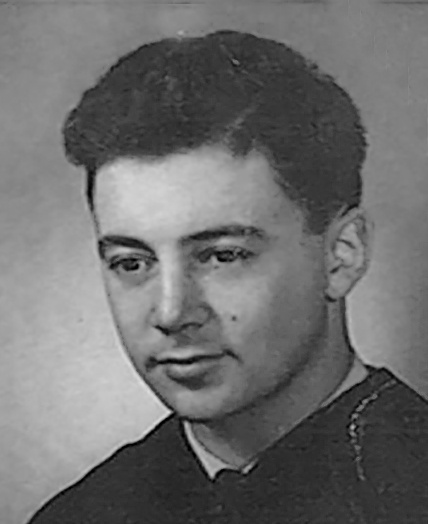
- Goffman, c. 1940
- Born: 11 June 1922; Mannville, Alberta, Canada
- Died: 19 November 1982 (aged 60); Philadelphia, Pennsylvania, U.S.
- Education: University of Manitoba (BSc); University of Toronto (BA); University of Chicago (MA, PhD)
- Known for: Total institution Various symbolic interactionist concepts: Dramaturgy; Interaction ritual; Stigma; Sign vehicle; Tie signs; Impression management
- Spouses: Angelica Schuyler Choate (m. 1952; died 1964) Gillian Sankoff (m. 1981)
- Children: 2, including Alice
- Relatives: Frances Bay (sister)
- Awards: Fellow, American Academy of Arts and Sciences, 1969; Guggenheim Fellowship, 1977; Cooley-Mead Award, 1979; Mead Award, 1983
- Scientific career
- Fields: Sociology
- Workplaces: National Institute of Mental Health; University of California, Berkeley; University of Pennsylvania; American Sociological Association; American Association for the Abolition of Involuntary Mental Hospitalization
- Thesis: Communication Conduct in an Island Community (1953)
- Doctoral advisor: W. Lloyd Warner
- Other academic advisors: Anselm Strauss
- Doctoral students: John Lofland, Harvey Sacks, Emanuel Schegloff, Eviatar Zerubavel

Erving Goffman (/ˈɡɒfmən/; 11 June 1922 – 19 November 1982) was a Canadian-born American sociologist, social psychologist, and writer, considered by some "the most influential American sociologist of the twentieth century". In 2007, The Times Higher Education Guide listed him as the sixth most-cited author of books in the humanities and social sciences.

Goffman was the 73rd president of the American Sociological Association. His best-known contribution to social theory is his study of symbolic interaction. This took the form of dramaturgical analysis, beginning with his 1956 book The Presentation of Self in Everyday Life. Goffman's other major works include Asylums (1961), Stigma (1963), Interaction Ritual (1967), Frame Analysis (1974), and Forms of Talk (1981). His major areas of study included the sociology of everyday life, social interaction, the social construction of self, social organization (framing) of experience, and particular elements of social life such as total institutions and stigmas.

== Early life and education ==
Goffman was born 11 June 1922, in Mannville, Alberta, Canada, to Max Goffman and Anne Goffman, née Averbach. He was from a family of Ukrainian Jews who had emigrated to Canada at the turn of the nineteenth century. He had an older sister, Frances Bay, who became an actress. The family moved to Dauphin, Manitoba, where his father operated a successful tailoring business.

From 1937, Goffman attended St. John's Technical High School in Winnipeg, where his family had moved that year. In 1939, he enrolled at the University of Manitoba, majoring in chemistry. He interrupted his studies and moved to Ottawa to work in the film industry for the National Film Board of Canada, established by John Grierson. Later he developed an interest in sociology. Also during this time, he met the renowned North American sociologist Dennis Wrong. Their meeting motivated Goffman to leave the University of Manitoba and enroll at the University of Toronto, where he studied at University College under C. W. M. Hart and Ray Birdwhistell, graduating in 1945 with a BA in sociology and anthropology. Later he moved to the University of Chicago, where he received an MA (1949) and PhD (1953) in sociology. For his doctoral dissertation, from December 1949 to May 1951 he lived and collected ethnographic data on the island of Unst in the Shetland Islands. Goffman's dissertation, entitled Communication Conduct in an Island Community (1953), was completed under the supervision of W. Lloyd Warner, Donald Horton, and Anselm Strauss.

== Career ==
The research Goffman did on Unst inspired him to write his first major work, The Presentation of Self in Everyday Life (1956). After graduating from the University of Chicago, in 1954–1957 he was an assistant to the athletic director at the National Institute for Mental Health in Bethesda, Maryland. Participant observation done there led to his essays on mental illness and total institutions which came to form his second book, Asylums: Essays on the Social Situation of Mental Patients and Other Inmates (1961).

In 1958, Goffman became a faculty member in the sociology department at the University of California, Berkeley, first as a visiting professor, then from 1962 as a full professor. In 1968, he moved to the University of Pennsylvania, receiving the Benjamin Franklin Chair in Sociology and Anthropology, due largely to the efforts of Dell Hymes, a former colleague at Berkeley. In 1969, he became a fellow of the American Academy of Arts and Sciences. In 1970, Goffman became a cofounder of the American Association for the Abolition of Involuntary Mental Hospitalization and coauthored its Platform Statement. In 1971, he published Relations in Public, in which he tied together many of his ideas about everyday life, seen from a sociological perspective. Another major book of his, Frame Analysis, came out in 1974. He received a Guggenheim Fellowship for 1977–1978. In 1979, Goffman received the Cooley-Mead Award for Distinguished Scholarship, from the Section on Social Psychology of the American Sociological Association. He was elected the 73rd president of the American Sociological Association, serving in 1981–1982, but was unable to deliver the presidential address in person due to progressing illness.

Posthumously, in 1983, Goffman received the Mead Award from the Society for the Study of Symbolic Interaction.

== Personal life and death ==
In 1952, Goffman married Angelica Schuyler Choate (nicknamed Sky); in 1953, their son Thomas was born. Angelica experienced mental illness and died by suicide in 1964.

In 1981, Goffman married sociolinguist Gillian Sankoff. The following year saw the birth of their daughter, Alice, who also became a sociologist.

Outside his academic career, Goffman was known for his interest, and relative success, in the stock market and gambling. At one point, in pursuit of his hobbies and ethnographic studies, he became a pit boss at a Las Vegas casino.

Goffman died in Philadelphia, Pennsylvania, on 19 November 1982, of stomach cancer.

== Influence and legacy ==
Goffman was influenced by Herbert Blumer, Émile Durkheim, Sigmund Freud, Everett Hughes, Alfred Radcliffe-Brown, Talcott Parsons, Alfred Schütz, Georg Simmel, and W. Lloyd Warner. Hughes was the "most influential of his teachers" according to Tom Burns. Gary Alan Fine and Philip Manning have said that Goffman never engaged in serious dialogue with other theorists, but his work has influenced and been discussed by numerous contemporary sociologists, including Anthony Giddens, Jürgen Habermas, and Pierre Bourdieu.

Though Goffman is often associated with the symbolic interaction school of sociological thought, he did not see himself as a representative of it, and so Fine and Manning conclude that he "does not easily fit within a specific school of sociological thought". His ideas are also "difficult to reduce to a number of key themes"; his work can be broadly described as developing "a comparative, qualitative sociology that aimed to produce generalizations about human behavior".

Goffman made substantial advances in the study of face-to-face interaction, elaborated the "dramaturgical approach" to human interaction, and developed numerous concepts that have had a massive influence, particularly in the field of the micro-sociology of everyday life. Much of his work was about the organization of everyday behavior, a concept he termed "interaction order". He contributed to the sociological concept of framing (frame analysis), to game theory (the concept of strategic interaction), and to the study of interactions and linguistics. With regard to the latter, he argued that the activity of speaking must be seen as a social rather than a linguistic construct. From a methodological perspective, Goffman often employed qualitative approaches, specifically ethnography, most famously in his study of social aspects of mental illness, in particular the functioning of total institutions. Overall, his contributions are valued as an attempt to create a theory that bridges the agency-and-structure divide—for popularizing social constructionism, symbolic interaction, conversation analysis, ethnographic studies, and the study and importance of individual interactions. His influence extended far beyond sociology: for example, his work provided the assumptions of much current research in language and social interaction within the discipline of communication.

Goffman introduced the concept of nonperson treatment as a level of social interaction.

Goffman defined "impression management" as a person's attempts to present an acceptable image to those around them, verbally or nonverbally. This definition is based on Goffman's idea that people see themselves as others view them, so they attempt to see themselves as if they are outside looking in. Goffman was also dedicated to discovering the subtle ways humans present acceptable images by concealing information that may conflict with the images for a particular situation, such as concealing tattoos when applying for a job in which tattoos would be inappropriate, or hiding a bizarre obsession such as collecting/interacting with dolls, which society may see as abnormal.

Goffman broke from George Herbert Mead and Herbert Blumer in that while he did not reject the way people perceive themselves, he was more interested in the actual physical proximity or the "interaction order" that molds the self. In other words, Goffman believed that impression management can be achieved only if the audience is in sync with a person's self-perception. If the audience disagrees with the image someone is presenting then their self-presentation is interrupted. People present images of themselves based on how society thinks they should act in a particular situation. This decision how to act is based on the concept of definition of the situation. Definitions are all predetermined and people choose how they will act by choosing the proper behavior for the situation they are in. Goffman also draws from William Thomas for this concept. Thomas believed that people are born into a particular social class and that the definitions of the situations they will encounter have already been defined for them. For instance. when an individual from an upper-class background goes to a black-tie affair, the definition of the situation is that they must mind their manners and act according to their class.

In 2007, The Times Higher Education Guide listed Goffman as the sixth most-cited author in the humanities and social sciences, behind Michel Foucault, Pierre Bourdieu, and Anthony Giddens, and ahead of Jürgen Habermas. His popularity with the general public has been attributed to his writing style, described as "sardonic, satiric, jokey", and as "ironic and self-consciously literary", and to its being more accessible than that of most academics. His style has also been influential in academia, and is credited with popularizing a less formal style in academic publications.

His students included Sherri Cavan, Carol Brooks Gardner, Charles Goodwin, Marjorie Harness Goodwin, John Lofland, Gary T. Marx, Harvey Sacks, Emanuel Schegloff, David Sudnow, and Eviatar Zerubavel.

Despite his influence, according to Fine and Manning there are "remarkably few scholars who are continuing his work", nor has there been a "Goffman school"; thus his impact on social theory has been simultaneously "great and modest". Fine and Manning attribute the lack of subsequent Goffman-style research and writing to the nature of his style, which they consider very difficult to duplicate (even "mimic-proof"), and also to his subjects' not being widely valued in the social sciences. Of his style, Fine and Manning remark that he tends to be seen either as a scholar whose style is difficult to reproduce, and therefore daunting to those who might wish to emulate it, or as a scholar whose work was transitional, bridging the work of the Chicago school and that of contemporary sociologists, and thus of less interest to sociologists than the classics of either of those groups. Of his subjects, Fine and Manning observe that the topic of behavior in public places is often stigmatized as trivial and unworthy of serious scholarly attention.

Nonetheless, Fine and Manning note that Goffman is "the most influential American sociologist of the twentieth century". Elliott and Turner see him as "a revered figure—an outlaw theorist who came to exemplify the best of the sociological imagination", and "perhaps the first postmodern sociological theorist".

== Works ==
=== Early works ===
Goffman's early works consist of his graduate writings of 1949–1953. His master's thesis was a survey of audience responses to a radio soap opera, Big Sister. One of its most important elements was a critique of his research methodology—of experimental logic and of variable analysis. Other writings from the period include Symbols of Class Status (1951) and On Cooling the Mark Out (1952). His doctoral dissertation, Communication Conduct in an Island Community (1953), presented a model of communication strategies in face-to-face interaction, and focused on how everyday rituals affect public projections of self.

=== Presentation of Self ===
Goffman's The Presentation of Self in Everyday Life was published in 1956, with a revised edition in 1959. He had developed the book's core ideas from his doctoral dissertation. It was Goffman's first and most famous book, for which he received the American Sociological Association's 1961 MacIver Award.

Goffman describes the theatrical performances that occur in face-to-face interactions. He holds that when someone comes in contact with another person, he attempts to control or guide the impression the other person will form of him, by altering his own setting, appearance and manner. At the same time, the second person attempts to form an impression of, and obtain information about, the first person. Goffman also believes that participants in social interactions engage in certain practices to avoid embarrassing themselves or others. Society is not homogeneous; we must act differently in different settings. This recognition led Goffman to his dramaturgical analysis. He saw a connection between the kinds of "acts" that people put on in their daily lives and theatrical performances. In a social interaction, as in a theatrical performance, there is an onstage area where actors (people) appear before the audience; this is where positive self-concepts and desired impressions are offered. But there is also a backstage—a hidden, private area where people can be themselves and drop their societal roles and identities.

=== Asylums ===
Goffman is sometimes credited with having coined the term "total institution", though Fine and Manning note that he had heard it in lectures by Everett Hughes in reference to any institution in which people are treated alike and in which behavior is regulated. Regardless of whether Goffman coined the term, he popularized it with his 1961 book Asylums: Essays on the Social Situation of Mental Patients and Other Inmates. The book has been described as "ethnography of the concept of the total institution". It was one of the first sociological examinations of the social situation of mental patients in psychiatric hospitals and a major contribution to understanding of social aspects of mental illness.

The book comprises four essays: "Characteristics of Total Institutions" (1957); "The Moral Career of the Mental Patient" (1959); "The Underlife of a Public Institution: A Study of Ways of Making Out in a Mental Hospital"; and "The Medical Model and Mental Hospitalization: Some Notes on the Vicissitudes of the Tinkering Trades". The first three focus on the experiences of patients; the last, on professional-client interactions. Goffman is mainly concerned with the details of psychiatric hospitalization and the nature and effects of the process he calls "institutionalization". He describes how institutionalization socializes people into the role of a good patient, someone "dull, harmless and inconspicuous"—a condition that in turn reinforces notions of chronicity in severe mental illness. Total institutions greatly affect people's interactions; yet even in such places, people find ways to redefine their roles and reclaim their identities.

Asylums has been credited with helping catalyze the reform of mental health systems in a number of countries, leading to reductions in the numbers of large mental hospitals and of the people locked up in them. It was also influential in the anti-psychiatry movement.

=== Behavior in Public Places ===
In Behavior in Public Places (1963), Goffman again focuses on everyday public interactions. He draws distinctions between several types of public gatherings ("gatherings", "situations", "social occasions") and types of audiences (acquainted versus unacquainted).

=== Stigma ===
Goffman's book Stigma: Notes on the Management of Spoiled Identity (1963) examines how, to protect their identities when they depart from approved standards of behavior or appearance, people manage impressions of themselves, mainly through concealment. Stigma pertains to the shame a person may feel when he or she fails to meet other people's standards, and to the fear of being discredited—which causes the person not to reveal his or her shortcomings. Thus a person with a criminal record may simply withhold that information for fear of judgment by whoever that person happens to encounter.

=== Interaction Ritual ===
Goffman's Interaction Ritual: Essays on Face-to-Face Behavior is a collection of six essays. The first four were originally published in the 1950s, the fifth in 1964, and the last was written for the collection. They include "On Face-work" (1955); "The Nature of Deference and Demeanor" (1956); "Embarrassment and Social Organization" (1956); "Alienation from Interaction" (1957); "Mental Symptoms and Public Order" (1964); and "Where the Action Is". He argues that many aspects of everyday social interaction, such as greetings, function as small ritual acts through which individuals reaffirm their social identities and demonstrate their competence. This perspective is largely influenced by Durkheim. Referring to Durkheim’s ideas in The Elementary Forms of Religious Life, Goffman claims that "the person in our urban secular world is allotted a kind of sacredness that is displayed and confirmed by symbolic acts."

The first essay, "On Face-work", discusses the concept of face, which is the positive self-image a person holds when interacting with others. Goffman believes that face "as a sociological construct of interaction is neither inherent in nor a permanent aspect of the person". Once someone offers a positive self-image of him- or herself to others, they feel a need to maintain and live up to that image. Inconsistency in how a person projects him- or herself in society risks embarrassment and discredit. So people remain guarded to ensure that they do not show themselves to others in an unfavorable light.

=== Strategic Interaction ===
Goffman's book Strategic Interaction (1969) is his contribution to game theory. It discusses the compatibility of game theory with the legacy of the Chicago School of sociology and with the perspective of symbolic interactionism. It is one of his few works that clearly engage with that perspective. Goffman's view on game theory was shaped by the works of Thomas Schelling. Goffman presents reality as a form of game, and discusses its rules and the various moves that players can make (the "unwitting", the "naive", the "covering", the "uncovering", and the "counter-uncovering") while trying to get or hide an information.

=== Frame Analysis ===
Goffman credited Gregory Bateson for creating the idea of framing and psychological frames. Frame Analysis: An Essay on the Organization of Experience (1974) is Goffman's attempt to explain how conceptual frames – ways to organize experience – structure an individual's perception of society. This book is thus about the organization of experience rather than the organization of society. A frame is a set of concepts and theoretical perspectives that organize experiences and guide the actions of individuals, groups and societies. Frame analysis, then, is the study of the organization of social experience. To illustrate the concept of the frame, Goffman gives the example of a picture frame: a person uses the frame (which represents structure) to hold together his picture (which represents the content) of what he is experiencing in his life.

The most basic frames are called primary frameworks. A primary framework takes an individual's experience or an aspect of a scene that would originally be meaningless and makes it meaningful. One type of primary framework is a natural framework, which identifies situations in the natural world and is completely biophysical, with no human influences. The other type of framework is a social framework, which explains events and connects them to humans. An example of a natural framework is the weather, and an example of a social framework is a meteorologist who predicts the weather. Focusing on the social frameworks, Goffman seeks to "construct a general statement regarding the structure, or form, of experiences individuals have at any moment of their social life".

Goffman saw this book as his magnum opus, but it was not as popular as his earlier works.

==== The Frame Analyses of Talk ====
In Frame Analysis, Erving Goffman provides a platform for understanding and interpreting the interaction between individuals engaging speech communication. In the chapter "The Frame Analyses of Talk," the focus is put on how words are exchanged and what is being said, specifically in informal talk or conversation. The concept of framing is introduced through an exploration of why misunderstandings occur in these basic, everyday conversations. He argues that they are more errors in verbal framing than anything else. The types of frames Goffman is considering are discussed in previous sections of the book, "fabrications, keyings, frame breaks, misframing, and, of course, frame disputes." That a frame can assume so many forms is the basis of his analyses, "these framings are subject to a multitude of different transformations − the warrant for a frame analysis in the first place."

Goffman's key idea is that most conversation is simply a replaying of a strip – what he describes as a personal experience or event. When we talk with others, the speaker's goal is often always the same, to provide "evidence for the fairness or unfairness of his current situation and other grounds for sympathy, approval, exoneration, understanding, or amusement. And what his listeners are primarily obliged to do is to show some kind of audience appreciation." Essentially, through interaction, we are only looking to be heard, not inspire any kind of action but simply to know that someone listened and understood. This is why often a simple head nod or grunt is accepted as an appropriate response in conversation.

Goffman explains that the way a conversation is keyed is critical to understanding the intent behind many utterances in everyday speech. Key is probably best understood as the tone of the dialogue which can change numerous times during an interaction. Signaling a change in key is one way that framing often takes place, "special brackets will have to be introduced should he want to say something in a relatively serious way: "Kidding aside," "Now, I'm really serious about this," and other such tags become necessary as a means of momentarily down keying the flow of words."

Folklorist Richard Bauman builds heavily on Goffman's work, specifically on the idea of key, in his work pertaining to an analysis of the performance frame. Bauman details that a performance is dependent on it being properly keyed, without this, the display will not be successful. His work on performance analyses is deeply indebted to what Goffman establishes here in "Frame Analyses."

Context is one other element to framing that is essential. "The participants will be bound by norms of good manners: through frequency and length of turns at talk, through topics avoided, through circumspection in regard to references about self, through attention offered eagerly or begrudgingly-through all these means, rank and social relationship will be given their due." Certain things can and will be said in one scenario that would never be uttered in another. An awareness of these social framings is critical, just as is an awareness of the audience. Depending on who you're speaking with (a teacher, a child, a loved one, a friend, a pet, etc.) you will curve your speech to fit the frame of what your intended audience is expecting.

Goffman uses the metaphor of conversation being a stage play. A play's tone will shift throughout the performance due to the actions taken by the actors; this is similar to how a discussion is keyed – based on what either person says or does over the course of an interaction, the key will change accordingly. The parallels go further, though. Goffman also claims that a speaker details a drama more often than they provide information. They invite the listener to empathize and, as was explained above, they are often not meant to be stirred to take action, but rather to show appreciation; during a play this generally takes the form of applause.

Other similarities include engaging in the suspense the speaker is attempting to create. In both scenarios, you must put aside the knowledge that the performers know the outcome of the event being relayed and, in a sense, play along. This is integral to his stance as he explains "the argument that much of talk consists of replayings and that these make no sense unless some form of storyteller's suspense can be maintained shows the close relevance of frame-indeed, the close relevance of dramaturgy-for the organization of talk." Lastly, because the replaying of strips is not extemporaneous, but rather preformulated, it is yet another parallel between a stage production and conversation. All of these things work in concert to provide a foundation of how talk is framed.

=== Gender Advertisements ===
In Gender Advertisements, Goffman analyzes how gender is represented in the advertising to which all individuals are commonly exposed. He suggested that women were often portrayed as passive, dependent on men, and somewhat childlike. However, the specific details of his argument remain somewhat ambiguous. Some scholars interpret his work as an analysis of gender representations in advertising, while others believe that advertisements were simply a convenient—though arguably weak—source of data for examining broader social norms and embodied practices. Despite this, his book has gained significance as a foundational text influencing more recent cultural studies approaches to media imagery, particularly those focusing on representations of the body.

In her 2001 work Measuring Up: How Advertising Affects Self-Image, Vickie Rutledge Shields stated that the work was "unique at the time for employing a method now being labeled 'semiotic content analysis'" and that it "[provided] the base for textual analyses ... such as poststructuralist and psychoanalytic approaches". She also noted that feminist scholars like Jean Kilbourne "[built] their highly persuasive and widely circulated findings on the nature of gender in advertising on Goffman's original categories".

=== Forms of Talk ===
Goffman's book, Forms of Talk (1981), includes five essays: "Replies and Responses" (1976); "Response Cries" (1978); "Footing" (1979); "The Lecture" (1976); and "Radio Talk" (1981). Each essay addresses both verbal and non-verbal communication through a sociolinguistic model. The book provides a comprehensive overview of the study of talk. In the introduction, Goffman identifies three themes that recur throughout the text: "ritualization, participation framework, and embedding".

The first essay, "Replies and Responses", concerns "conversational dialogue" and the way people respond during a conversation, both verbally and non-verbally. The second essay, "Response Cries", considers the use of utterances and their social implications in different social contexts. Specifically, Goffman discusses "self-talk" (talking to no one in particular) and its role in social situations. Next, in "Footing", Goffman addresses the way that footing, or alignment, can shift during a conversation. The fourth essay, "The Lecture", originally an oral presentation, describes different types and methods of lecture. Lastly, in "Radio Talk", Goffman describes the types and forms of talk used in radio programming and the effect they have on listeners.

== Positions ==
In his career, Goffman worked at the:

- University of Edinburgh, Department of Social Anthropology and Social Sciences Research Centre: researcher, 1949–1952;
- University of Chicago, Division of Social Sciences, Chicago: assistant, 1952–1953; resident associate, 1953–1954;
- National Institute of Mental Health, Bethesda, Maryland: visiting scientist, 1954–1957;
- University of California, Berkeley: assistant professor, 1957–1959; professor, 1959–1962; professor of sociology, 1962–1968;
- University of Pennsylvania, Philadelphia: Benjamin Franklin Professor of Anthropology and Sociology, 1969–1982.

== Selected works ==
- 1959: The Presentation of Self in Everyday Life. University of Edinburgh Social Sciences Research Centre.
- 1961: Asylums: Essays on the Social Situation of Mental Patients and Other Inmates. New York, Doubleday.
- 1961: Encounters: Two Studies in the Sociology of Interaction. Indianapolis, Bobbs-Merrill. The studies are Fun in Games and Role Distance.
- 1963: Behavior in Public Places: Notes on the Social Organization of Gatherings. The Free Press.
- 1963: Stigma: Notes on the Management of Spoiled Identity. Prentice-Hall.
- 1967: Interaction Ritual: Essays on Face-to-Face Behavior. Anchor Books.
- 1969: Strategic Interaction. Philadelphia: University of Pennsylvania Press.
- 1969: Where the action is. Allen Lane.
- 1971: Relations in Public: Microstudies of the Public Order. New York: Basic Books. Includes discussion of "Tie Signs".
- 1974: Frame analysis: An essay on the organization of experience. London: Harper and Row. ISBN 978-0-06-090372-5
- 1979: Gender Advertisements. Macmillan. ISBN 978-0-06-132076-7
- 1981: Forms of Talk. Philadelphia: University of Pennsylvania Press. ISBN 978-0-8122-7790-6

== See also ==
- Civil inattention – Behaviors which allow strangers to maintain social order in crowded public spaces
- Deinstitutionalization – Replacement of psychiatric hospitals
- Franco Basaglia – Italian psychiatrist (1924–1980)
- The Radical Therapist – Former psychotherapy journal
