= Timeline of disability rights in the United Kingdom =

This disability rights timeline lists events relating to the civil rights of people with disabilities in the United Kingdom, including court decisions, the passage of legislation, activists' actions, significant abuses of people with disabilities, and the founding of various organizations. Although the disability rights movement itself began in the 1960s, advocacy for the rights of people with disabilities started much earlier and continues to the present.

== Prior to the 1700s ==
- 1200s – In the 13th century, England declared people with intellectual disabilities to be incapable of making decisions or managing their affairs.
- 1324 – The idea of insanity in English law dates from 1324, when the Statute de Praerogativa Regis allowed the King to take the lands of "idiots and lunatics."

== 1700s ==
- 1714 – In English law, the Vagrancy Act 1714 (13 Ann. c. 26) allowed two justices of the peace to confine a dangerous lunatic.
- 1774 – The Madhouses Act 1774 (14 Geo. 3. c. 49) was an act of the Parliament of Great Britain, which set out a legal framework for regulating "madhouses" (insane asylums). It was repealed by the Madhouses Act 1828.

== 1800s ==
- 1800 – The Criminal Lunatics Act 1800 (39 & 40 Geo. 3. c. 94) was an act of the Parliament of Great Britain, that required and established a set procedure for the indefinite detention of mentally ill offenders. It was passed through the House of Commons in direct reaction to the trial of James Hadfield, who attempted to assassinate King George III.
- 1808 – The County Asylums Act 1808 formed mental health law in England and Wales from 1808 to 1845. Notably, the County Asylums Act 1808 established public mental asylums in Britain. The act is also known as Mr. Wynn's Act, after Charles Watkin Williams-Wynn, member of parliament for Montgomeryshire, who promoted the act.
- 1811 – The Marriage of Lunatics Act 1811 declared that any marriage entered into by a certified lunatic was void. This law was repealed for Ireland by the Assisted Decision-Making (Capacity) Act 2015.
- 1815 – The Madhouses (Scotland) Act 1815 (55 Geo. 3. c. 69) made provision for patients paying money to be held in institutions that were run for a profit by private individuals.
- 1815 – The Criminal Lunatics Amendment Act 1815 was enacted by the Parliament of the United Kingdom as "An Act for the Safe Custody of Insane Persons Charged with Offenses".
- 1819 – The Pauper Lunatics Act 1819 was enacted, "for making provision for the better care of pauper lunatics in England".
- 1828 – The County Asylums Act 1828 was enacted in England as "An Act to amend the Laws for the Erection and Regulation of County Lunatic Asylums. And more effectually to provide for the care and maintenance of Pauper and Criminal Lunatics in England".
- 1828 – The Madhouses Act 1828 was enacted in England, and it reconstituted the Metropolitan Commissioners in Lunacy and declared there should be fifteen of them, with five of those being physicians. It also repealed the Madhouses Act 1774.
- 1828 – The Chancery Lunatics Property Act 1828 was enacted as "An Act for extending the Acts passed in the forty-third and fifty-ninth years of the reign of his late majesty King George the third, for the sale of mortgages of estates of persons found lunatics by inquisition taken in England and Ireland, so as to authorise such sale and mortgage for some purposes; and for rendering Inquisitions on Commissions of Lunacy taken in England available in Ireland, and like Inquisitions taken in Ireland available in England."
- 1832 – The Madhouses Act 1832 was enacted by the Parliament of the United Kingdom.
- 1840s – The M'Naghten rule (pronounced, and sometimes spelled, "McNaughton") is any variant of the 1840s jury instruction in a criminal case when there is a defense of insanity:

"that every man is to be presumed to be sane, and... that to establish a defense on the ground of insanity, it must be clearly proved that, at the time of the committing of the act, the party accused was laboring under such a defect of reason, from disease of the mind, as not to know the nature and quality of the act he was doing; or if he did know it, that he did not know he was doing what was wrong."

The rules so formulated as M'Naghten's Case 1843 10 C & F 200 have been a standard test for criminal liability in relation to mentally disordered defendants in common law jurisdictions ever since, with some minor adjustments. When the tests set out by the rules are satisfied, the accused may be adjudged "not guilty by reason of insanity" or "guilty but insane" and the sentence may be a mandatory or discretionary (but usually indeterminate) period of treatment in a secure hospital facility, or otherwise at the discretion of the court (depending on the country and the offence charged) instead of a punitive disposal. The insanity defence is recognized in Australia, Canada, England and Wales, Hong Kong, India, the Republic of Ireland, New Zealand, and Norway (as well as most U.S. states with the exception of Idaho, Kansas, Montana, Utah, and Vermont) but not all of these jurisdictions still use the M'Naghten Rules.

- 1845 – The Lunacy Act 1845 (8 & 9 Vict. c. 100) and the County Asylums Act 1845 formed mental health law in England and Wales from 1845 to 1890. The Lunacy Act 1845's most important provision was a change in the status of mentally ill people to patients. As well, the Lunacy Act 1845 created the Commissioners in Lunacy or Lunacy Commission, a UK public body established to oversee asylums and the welfare of mentally ill people. It succeeded the Metropolitan Commissioners in Lunacy. The Lunacy Act 1845 was passed through Parliament simultaneously with the County Asylums Act 1845. The two acts were dependent on each other. The Lunacy Act 1845 established the Lunacy Commission and the County Asylums Act 1845 set forth most of the provisions as to what was to be monitored within the asylums and helped establish the public network of the county asylums. Like the Lunacy Act 1845, there had been several drafts of this act passed before 1845 and several afterward as well. The most notable of these were the County Asylum Act 1808, and the County Asylum Act 1853. The Lunacy Act 1845 itself was amended several times after its conception. There was a new version written in both 1846 and 1847. Both of these versions were actually repealed by the County Asylums Act 1853. The importance of these two acts together is that they consolidated Lunacy Law in England. However, no legislation has ever combined the entirety of Lunacy Law. Both of these acts were the basis for Lunacy Law in England until 1890 when both of them were repealed by the Lunacy Act 1890.
- 1883 – The Trial of Lunatics Act 1883 is an act of the Parliament of the United Kingdom, allowing the jury to return a verdict that the defendant was guilty, but insane at the time, and should be kept in custody as a "criminal lunatic". This act was passed at the request of Queen Victoria, who, the target of frequent attacks by individuals with mental illness, demanded that the verdict be changed from "not guilty" so as to act as a deterrent to other "lunatics"; the phrasing of "guilty of the act or omission charged, but insane so as not to be responsible, according to law, for his actions." remained in use until the Criminal Procedure (Insanity) Act 1964. It was cited in 1991 in the case of R v Burgess regarding the automatism defence. The form of special verdict provided for by this act was commonly known as guilty but insane. This expression was not an accurate description of that verdict.
- 1886 – The Idiots Act 1886 (49 & 50 Vict. c. 25) was an act of Parliament of the United Kingdom. It was intended to give "... facilities for the care, education, and training of Idiots and Imbeciles". The Act made, for the first time, the distinction between "lunatics", "idiots", and "imbeciles" for the purpose of making entry into education establishments easier and for defining the ways they were cared for. Before the act, learning institutions for idiots and imbeciles were seen as either "licensed houses" or "registered hospitals" for lunatics, for which the parents of children hoping to enter would have to complete a form stating that they were "a lunatic, an idiot, or a person of unsound mind". Additionally, they were required to answer irrelevant questions and present two medical certificates. The act was repealed by the Mental Deficiency Act 1913, by which time two further classifications had been introduced: "feeble-minded people" and "moral defectives".
- 1886 – The Lunacy (Vacating of Seats) Act 1886 (49 & 50 Vict. c. 16) was an act of the Parliament of the United Kingdom. It provided a mechanism for a Member of Parliament who was judged to be of unsound mind to be removed from his seat.
- 1890 – The Lunacy Act 1890 repealed the Lunacy Act 1845 (8 & 9 Vict. c. 100) and the County Asylums Act 1845, which had formed mental health law in England and Wales.

== 1900-1949 ==
- 1913 – The Mental Deficiency Act 1913 was an act of the United Kingdom which made provisions for the institutional treatment of people deemed to be "feeble-minded" and "moral defectives". "It proposed an institutional separation so that mental defectives should be taken out of Poor Law institutions and prisons into newly established colonies." It was repealed by the Mental Health Act 1959. The 1913 act created the Board of Control for Lunacy and Mental Deficiency, which was a United Kingdom body overseeing the treatment of the mentally ill. The Board was created to replace the Commissioners in Lunacy, under the Home Office but independent in that it reported to the Lord Chancellor (who would investigate breaches of care and integrity). It was transferred to the Ministry of Health by the Ministry of Health Act 1919 and reorganized in 1930. The Board consisted of: a chairman, two Senior Medical Commissioners, one Senior Legal Commissioner, six Commissioners (lawyers and doctors), six Inspectors and administrative staff. By law, at least one of these had to be a woman. The Commissioners of the board went round the country seeing that those detained under the various mental and mental deficiency Acts were legally in custody and that care was proper and moneys and other properties owned by patients were not being misused or stolen. The board was based in Northumberland Avenue, London, until 1939 when it was moved to Hobart House, Grosvenor Place. Its responsibility was limited to England and Wales. Its functions were transferred to the Minister of Health by the National Health Service Act 1946.
- 1915 – People v. Schmidt, 216 N.Y. 324 (1915), is a British criminal case interpreting "wrong" in the M'Naghten rule for an insanity defense. The M'naghten rule included that a person was not guilty because of insanity if, because of a mental disorder, the defendant was not able to know her act was wrong. The court interpreted "wrong" to refer to knowledge the act was morally wrong, not knowledge that it was legally wrong. The court wrote, "The [M'Naghten] court expressly held that a defendant who knew nothing of the law would nonetheless be responsible if he know that the act was wrong, by which, therefore they must have meant, if he knew it was morally wrong... There is nothing to justify the belief that the words right and wrong, when they became limited by M'Naghten's case to the right and wrong of a particular act, cast off their meaning in terms of morals, and became terms of pure legality." The court also wrote on knowledge of moral wrongness in the case of a delusion of a deific decree, that God ordered a criminal act, when defendant knows the act is morally and legally wrong, "It seems a mockery to say that, within the meaning of the statute, she knows that the act is wrong."The court wrote that if a person has an insane delusion that "he has a command from the Almighty to kill, it is difficult to understand how such a man can know that it is wrong for him to do so."
- 1920: The Blind Persons Act 1920 passes in the United Kingdom. It is the first legislation worldwide in support of equal rights for disabled people.
- 1930 – The Mental Treatment Act 1930 was an act of the Parliament of the United Kingdom that permitted voluntary admission to, and outpatient treatment within, psychiatric hospitals. It also replaced the term "asylum" with "mental hospital". It was repealed by the Mental Health Act 1959.

== 1950s ==
- 1952 – In English law, in R v Windle [1952] 2 QB 826 evidence proved that although the killer did have a mental illness he knew that he was committing a crime. The trial judge thus refused to let the insanity defense go to the jury and this decision was upheld on appeal.
- 1957 – Section 2 of the Homicide Act 1957 of the United Kingdom states:

(1) Where a person kills or is party to a killing of another, he shall not be convicted of murder if he was suffering from an abnormality of mental functioning which —
(a) arose from a medical condition
(b) substantially impaired D's ability to do one or more of the things mentioned in subsection (1A), and
(c) provides an explanation for D's acts and omissions in doing or being a party to the killing.
(1A) Those things are –
(a) to understand the nature of D's conduct;
(b) to form a rational judgment;
(c) to exercise self-control.
(1B) For the purposes of subsection (1)(c), an abnormality of mental functioning provides and explanation of D's conduct if it causes, or is a significant contributory factor in causing, D to carry out that conduct.

The defence has been amended by section 52 of the Coroners and Justice Act 2009, which came into force on 4 October 2010. As well, R v Golds provides a recent authority from the Court of Appeal Criminal Division on how the courts will interpret the term 'substantial' in regard to the Homicide Act 1957. At paragraph [55] of Elias LJ's judgment (following the paragraphing from the neutral citation given below) two senses of the word 'substantial' are identified: (i) something substantial is more than something which is merely trivial or minimal owing to the fact that it has "substance", or (ii) something substantial is big or large (e.g. in the sense that a substantial salary is a large one). At paragraph [72] Elias LJ concludes by opining that the court should (i) leave interpretation of the word 'substantial' to the jury, but if asked for further help should (ii) direct them under the second meaning of the term (i.e. substantial meaning big).

- 1957 – In English law in R v Kemp [1957] 1 QB 399, where the defendant's arteriosclerosis led to him assaulting his wife while unconscious, it was ruled that in the insanity defense, there should be no distinction made between diseases of the mind, and diseases of the body affecting the operation of the mind, and it should be considered irrelevant whether the insanity was curable or not, or permanent or not. The jury returned a verdict of guilty but insane.
- 1959 – The Mental Health Act 1959 was an act of the Parliament of the United Kingdom concerning England and Wales which had, as its main objectives, to abolish the distinction between psychiatric hospitals and other types of hospitals and to deinstituitionalise mental health patients and see them treated more by community care. It also defined the term mental disorder for the first time: "mental illness as distinct from learning disability. The definition was "mental illness; arrest or incomplete development of mind; psychopathic disorder; and any other disorder or disability of mind". At the time, 0.4% of the population of England were housed in asylums, receiving the standard treatments of the time. Their treatment was considered by the 1957 Percy Commission and the act resulted from its deliberations. The act was designed to make treatment voluntary and informal, and where compulsory give it a proper legal framework and made as a medical decision, and to move treatment, where possible, away from institutional care to that in the community. The Act repealed the Lunacy and Mental Treatment Acts 1890 to 1930 and the Mental Deficiency Acts 1913 to 1938. Another of the changes introduced by the Act was the abolishment of the category of "moral imbecile". The category, which had been introduced in 1913, had been defined in such vague terms that it had allowed also mothers of illegitimate children, especially in case of repeated births out of wedlock, to be regarded as "moral imbeciles" and thus to be placed in an institution for defectives or to be placed under guardianship.
- 1959 - One of the first studies to address the issue of institutionalization directly was British psychiatrist Russell Barton's 1959 book Institutional Neurosis, which claimed that many symptoms of mental illness (specifically, psychosis) were not physical brain defects as once thought, but were consequences of institutions' "stripping" (a term probably first used in this context by Erving Goffman) away the "psychological crutches" of their patients.

== 1960s ==
- 1960 – In English Law the concept of "irresistible impulse" was developed in the 1960 case R v. Byrne. The appellant (described as a violent sexual psychopath) strangled then mutilated a young woman; it was alleged that Byrne had violent and perverted sexual desires which he found impossible to control. Lord Parker C.J. broadened the definition of "abnormality of mind" to include those lacking "the ability to exercise will-power to control acts in accordance with [their] rational judgment". "Irresistible impulse" can be pleaded only under the defense of diminished responsibility, not under the defense of insanity. Thus it operates only as a partial defence to murder,reducing the charge to manslaughter, and giving the judge discretion as to length of sentence and whether committalwould be more appropriate than incarceration.
- 1961 - Enoch Powell, Minister for Health in the United Kingdom in the early 1960s, was appalled by what he witnessed on his visits to asylums, and his famous "water tower" speech in 1961 called for the closure of all National Health Service asylums and their replacement by wards in general hospitals. In that speech he said in part:

"There they stand, isolated, majestic, imperious, brooded over by the gigantic water-tower and chimney combined, rising unmistakable and daunting out of the countryside - the asylums which our forefathers built with such immense solidity to express the notions of their day. Do not for a moment underestimate their powers of resistance to our assault. Let me describe some of the defenses which we have to storm."

- 1964 – The Criminal Procedure (Insanity) Act 1964 was enacted. In English law, if a defendant at the time of trial claims he is insane, this hinges on whether or not he is able to understand the charge, the difference between "guilty" and "not guilty" and is able to instruct his lawyers. If he is unable to do these things, he can be found "unfit to plead" under Section 4 of the Criminal Procedure (Insanity) Act 1964. In that situation, the judge has wide discretion as to what to do with the defendant, except in cases of murder, where he must be detained in hospital.
- 1967 – In Great Britain under the Abortion Act 1967, abortion is permitted if there is risk to the life of the pregnant woman, a necessity for abortion to prevent grave permanent injury to the physical or mental health of the pregnant woman, risk of injury to the physical or mental health of the pregnant woman or any existing children of her family (up to a term limit of 24 weeks of gestation), or substantial risk that if the child were born, it would "suffer from such physical or mental abnormalities as to be seriously handicapped".
- 1968 – After a long campaign by The Sunday Times, a compensation settlement for the UK victims of thalidomide was reached with Distillers Company (now part of Diageo), which had distributed the drug in the UK. This compensation, which is distributed by the Thalidomide Trust in the UK, was substantially increased by Diageo in 2005. The UK Government gave survivors a grant of £20 million, to be distributed through the Thalidomide Trust, in December 2009.

== 1970s ==
- 1970 - The Chronically Sick and Disabled Persons Act 1970 is an act of Parliament which makes provision with respect to the welfare of chronically sick and disabled persons. The act, often shortened to ′CSDPA', was given Royal Assent on 29 May 1970.
- 1972 – The Committee on Mentally Abnormal Offenders, widely referred to as the Butler Committee after its chairman Lord Butler of Saffron Walden, was set up in 1972 by the Government of the United Kingdom. The Committee submitted an Interim Report in 1974 and published a Final Report in October 1975, proposing major reforms to the law and to psychiatric services.
- 1973 – In English law, in R v Quick and Paddison [1973] QB 910, the courts decided that an assault committed when the defendant was suffering from hypoglycemia due to the taking of insulin was not insane in nature.

== 1980s ==
- 1981 – In the British case R v Arthur a baby was born with uncomplicated Down syndrome and was rejected by the parents. Leonard Arthur, a paediatrician, wrote in his notes that the 'Parents do not wish it to survive. Nursing care only.' The baby died 69 hours later. During the trial, the defence provided evidence that the child was not physically healthy, resulting in a reduced charge of attempted murder, for which Arthur was acquitted.
- 1981 - The British Council of Organisations of Disabled People was founded.
- 1983: The Mental Health Act 1983 (c. 20) is an act of Parliament which applies to people in England and Wales. It covers the reception, care and treatment of mentally disordered persons, the management of their property and other related matters. In particular, it provides the legislation by which people diagnosed with a mental disorder can be detained in hospital or police custody and have their disorder assessed or treated against their wishes, unofficially known as "sectioning". Its use is reviewed and regulated by the Care Quality Commission. The act has been significantly amended by the Mental Health Act 2007. Notably, the 1983 act classified psychosurgery as a treatment that could only be carried out with a patient's consent. Under section 57 of the act, which applies to both detained and informal patients, a panel of three people appointed by the Mental Health Act Commission has to establish that the patient is consenting. Then the psychiatrist on the panel authorises the operation if it is likely to alleviate or prevent deterioration in the patient's condition. The 1983 act (as amended by the 2007 act) also defines the designated relationship of nearest relative. It is the duty of the Approved mental health professional to determine who is the nearest relative of the patient and consult them in the process of assessment, treatment or guardianship. Also, section 1 of the Mental Health (Discrimination) Act 2013 (introduced into Parliament as the Mental Health (Discrimination) (No. 2) Bill) removed from the Mental Health Act 1983 the provision that disqualifies from the House of Commons a member sectioned for over six months under that act.
- 1983 – Care in the Community (also called "Community Care" or "Domiciled Care") is the British policy of deinstitutionalization, treating, and caring for physically and mentally disabled people in their homes rather than in an institution. Institutional care was the target of widespread criticism during the 1960s and 1970s, but it was not until 1983 that the government of Margaret Thatcher adopted a new policy of care after the Audit Commissionpublished a report called 'Making a Reality of Community Care' which outlined the advantages of domiciled care.
- 1984 – In English law, in R v Sullivan, a man was charged with grievous bodily harm under the Offences against the Person Act 1861 after assaulting his friend during an epileptic seizure. The House of Lords ruled that Sullivan was indeed insane, and that "it does not lie within the power of the courts to alter [the insanity test]".
- 1984 – The Mental Health (Scotland) Act 1984 was enacted. One of the main purposes of the Mental Health (Public Safety and Appeals) (Scotland) Act 1999 is to introduce a right of appeal against a decision, notification or recommendation of a sheriff in relation to an appeal brought by a restricted patient in terms of Part VI of the Mental Health (Scotland) Act 1984. The right of appeal against the sheriff's decision, notification or recommendation is conferred on both the patient and the Scottish Ministers. The appeal is to the Court of Session. The 1984 act was subsequently largely replaced by the Mental Health (Care and Treatment) (Scotland) Act 2003.
- 1989 – In English law, in R v Hennsey [1989] 1 WLR 287 it was held that a crime committed while the defendant was suffering from hyperglycemia did constitute insanity.
- 1989 - The British Council of Organisations of Disabled People started the National Centre for Independent Living (NCIL, 1989–2011) as a project, which became a spin-out independent organization in the early 2000s before merging with two other organizations to form Disability Rights UK in January 2012.

== 1990s ==
- 1991 – Care Programme Approach (CPA) is a system of delivering community mental health services to individuals diagnosed with a mental illness. It was introduced in England in 1991 and by 1996 became a key component of the mental health system in England. The approach requires that health and social services assess need, provided a written care plan, allocate a care coordinator, and then regularly review the plan with key stakeholders, in keeping with the National Health Service and Community Care Act 1990.
- 1991 – R v Burgess [1991] 2 QB 92 was an appeal in the Court of Appeal of England and Wales that adjudged sleepwalking entailing violence from an internal, organic cause amounts to insane automatism. At first instance Burgess was likewise found not guilty by reason of insanity as his case fell under the M'Naghten Rules. This would entail a possible stigma and a treatment plan. His defence team appealed arguing such automatism was no form of 'insanity' but fell within the class of automatism such as a spiked drink which could show a complete lack of mens rea, outside the realms of normal mental health, to make him guilty. The court ruled that violent sleepwalking with no external triggers was considered insane automatism. Thus the appeal was heard, argued, the law and its consequences judicially considered. The appeal was dismissed.
- 1993 – Tony Bland was a supporter of Liverpool F.C. injured in the Hillsborough disaster. He experienced severe brain damage that left him in a persistent vegetative state as a consequence of which the hospital, with the support of his parents, applied for a court order allowing him to 'die with dignity'. As a result, in 1993 he became the first patient in English legal history to be allowed to die by the courts through the withdrawal of life-prolonging treatment including food and water.
- 1995 – The Disability Discrimination Act 1995 (DDA 1995) became law in the United Kingdom. This made it unlawful to discriminate against people with disabilities in relation to employment, the provision of goods and services, education, and transport. The Equality and Human Rights Commission provides support for this Act. Equivalent legislation exists in Northern Ireland, which is enforced by the Northern Ireland Equality Commission.
- 1997 – In DPP v Harper [1997], it was decided that the insanity defence could also be applied in a magistrates' court in England and Wales.
- 1998 – In R v Bournewood Community and Mental Health NHS Trust the House of Lords ruled that a man who had been informally admitted to a psychiatric hospital without capable consent had not been unlawfully detained under the common law. A later European Court of Human Rights ruling, however, found that the man had been unlawfully deprived of his liberty in the meaning of Article 5 of the European Convention on Human Rights.
- 1999 – The Disability Rights Commission Act 1999 abolished the National Disability Council and replaced it with a Disability Rights Commission. Like the council, the Commission covered England, Scotland and Wales. However unlike the Council it also had power to support individuals seeking to enforce their rights (Disability Rights Commission Act 1999 s.7) and powers of investigation (Disability Rights Commission Act 1999 s.3).
- 1999 – The Mental Health (Public Safety and Appeals) (Scotland) Act 1999 was an Act of the Scottish Parliament which was passed by the Parliament in September 1999 and was designed to close a loophole in the law which led to the release of mentally ill killer, Noel Ruddle, who was released from the state hospital at Carstairs after arguing its treatment programmes were no longer of benefit to him. The Act had two main purposes: The first was to add a new criterion to the statutory tests applied by a sheriff or the Scottish Ministers when considering whether to order the discharge of a restricted patient. The sheriff and the Scottish Ministers must now refuse to order a discharge (either conditional or absolute) if satisfied that the patient has a mental disorder, the effect of which is that continuing detention in hospital is necessary to protect the public from serious harm. That is so whether or not the patient is to receive medical treatment for the mental disorder. The second is to introduce a right of appeal against a decision, notification or recommendation of a sheriff in relation to an appeal brought by a restricted patient in terms of Part VI of the Mental Health (Scotland) Act 1984. The right of appeal against the sheriff's decision, notification or recommendation is conferred on both the patient and the Scottish Ministers. The appeal is to the Court of Session. The Act also widens the term 'mental disorder', which appears in earlier legislation, to include a personality disorder.

== 2000s ==
- 2000 – The Adults with Incapacity (Scotland) Act 2000 (2000 asp 4) is an Act of the Scottish Parliament. It was passed on 29 March 2000, receiving royal assent on 9 May. It concerns the welfare of adults (the age of legal capacity in Scotland being 16) who are unable to make decisions for themselves because they have a mental disorder or are not able to communicate. It provides the framework for other people (such as carers) to act on the behalf of people with incapacity.
- 2001 – Re A (conjoined twins) [2001] 2 WLR 480 is a Court of Appeal of England and Wales decision on the separation of conjoined twins. Gracie and Rosie Attard, who were born on 8 August 2000, were conjoined twins who were joined at the abdomen. The medical evidence indicated that Gracie was the stronger sibling who was sustaining the life of Rosie. Rosie had only survived birth due to a shared common artery that enabled her sister Gracie to oxygenate blood for both twins. If surgically separated, Gracie had a 94% survival rate, but Rosie was guaranteed to die. However, if they were left conjoined, then Gracie's health—which was already rapidly deteriorating—was predicted to fail before they were six months old. Gracie's death would inevitably result in Rosie's. At first instance, Mr Justice Johnson was left to decide the case without any direct precedents to guide him but reasoned by analogy with Airedale NHS Trust v Bland where it was declared acceptable to remove life support. Johnson ruled that separation would not be murder but a case of "passive euthanasia" in which food and hydration would be withdrawn. The Court of Appeal rejected this analysis but the three judges who presided over the case gave very different legal reasoning. Lord Justice Alan Ward invoked the concept of self-defence suggesting that "If [Gracie] could speak she would surely protest, Stop it, [Rosie], you're killing me." Lord Justice Brooke relied upon R v Dudley and Stephens and invoked necessity as a defence. Lord Justice Robert Walker focused upon the intention of the surgeons in concluding that surgery could go ahead. The 20-hour-long operation to separate the twins took place on 7 November 2000. As expected, Gracie survived the operation and Rosie died. Rosie's remains were later buried on the Maltese island of Gozo.
- 2003 - In the United Kingdom, disability hate crime is regarded as an aggravating factor under Section 146 of the Criminal Justice Act 2003, allowing a heavier tariff to be used in sentencing than the crime might draw without the hate elements. Section 146 states that the sentencing provisions apply if:

(a) that, at the time of committing the offence, or immediately before or after doing so, the offender demonstrated towards the victim of the offence hostility based on—

(i) the sexual orientation (or presumed sexual orientation) of the victim, or
(ii) a disability (or presumed disability) of the victim, or

(b) that the offence is motivated (wholly or partly)—

(i) by hostility towards persons who are of a particular sexual orientation, or
(ii) by hostility towards persons who have a disability or a particular disability.

- 2003 – The Forensic Network (the shortened name of the Forensic Mental Health Services Managed Care Network), one of Scotland's Managed Clinical Network, was established in Scotland in September 2003 by Scottish Government, in conjunction with "The Mental Health (Care and Treatment) (Scotland) Act 2003", and following a review of the State Hospital's Board for Scotland, 'The Right Place - The Right Time'.
- 2003 – On March 18, 2003, the UK government formally recognized that British Sign Language was a language in its own right.
- 2003 – The Mental Health (Care and Treatment) (Scotland) Act 2003, which came into effect on 5 October 2005, is an Act of the Scottish Parliament which enables medical professionals to detain and treat people against their will on grounds of mental disorder, with the Mental Health Tribunal for Scotland and the Mental Welfare Commission for Scotland providing safeguards against mistreatment. It largely replaces the Mental Health (Scotland) Act 1984. Two particularly notable features of the 2003 act are as follows: Under section 234 of the Mental Health (Care and Treatment) (Scotland) Act 2003, psychosurgery can only be carried out on consenting patients if a panel from the Mental Welfare Commission confirms that the patient's consent is valid and that the operation is in their best interests. It may also be carried out on incapable patients, as long as they are not objecting, with Court of Session approval, but since the law came into force, no non-consenting patients have undergone psychosurgery. Secondly, in Scotland the Mental Health (Care and Treatment) (Scotland) Act 2003 gives patients with capacity the right to refuse ECT.
- 2004 - The police, fire service, and prison service were included in disability anti-discrimination laws in the United Kingdom from October 2004.
- 2004 – In Camden, a beggar with a wound on his neck was charged with an Anti-Social Behavior Order. This barred him from re-entering the town.
- 2005 – Joanna Jepson instigated a legal challenge to the late abortion of a 28-week-old foetus in the United Kingdom in 2001. The reasons given for the termination were associated with the fetus having a cleft lip and palate – grounds which Jepson argued did not constitute "a serious handicap" under the terms of the 1967 UK Abortion Act. Jepson, who was born with a jaw deformity herself, and whose brother was disabled, argued that the abortion was an "unlawful killing". However, in 2005 a judicial review concluded that the doctors carrying out the abortion had "acted in good faith", and would not face prosecution.
- 2005 – The Mental Capacity Act 2005 (c 9) is an Act of the Parliament of the United Kingdom applying to England and Wales. Its primary purpose is to provide a legal framework for acting and making decisions on behalf of adults who lack the capacity to make particular decisions for themselves. It was amended by the Mental Health Act 2007.
- 2006 – The Fixated Threat Assessment Centre (FTAC) is a joint police/mental health unit set up in October 2006 by the Home Office, the Department of Health and Metropolitan Police Service to assess and manage the risk to politicians, members of the British Royal Family, and other public figures from obsessive individuals.
- 2006 – The Disability Discrimination (Northern Ireland) Order 2006 strengthened and extended the coverage of the Disability Discrimination Act 1995, increasing the scope of legislation to include more people with disabilities, such as people diagnosed with cancer, HIV, and multiple sclerosis (MS), but not yet showing signs of their illness. Also, people with mental ill health no longer had to prove their condition was "clinically well-recognised". The new laws also provided extra protection for disabled people in other areas such as private clubs and in discriminatory job advertisements, and provided that all trains will have to be fully accessible to those with disabilities by 2020.
- 2006 – The Equality Act 2006 was passed in the United Kingdom. The 2006 Act is a precursor to the Equality Act 2010, which combines all of the equality enactments within Great Britain and provides comparable protections across all equality strands. Those explicitly mentioned by the Equality Act 2006 include age; disability; gender; proposed, commenced or completed gender reassignment; race; religion or belief and sexual orientation. The changes it made included creating the Equality and Human Rights Commission (EHRC), merging the Commission for Racial Equality, the Equal Opportunities Commission and the Disability Rights Commission.
- 2007 – The Mental Health Act 2007 (c 12) is an Act of the Parliament of the United Kingdom. It amends the Mental Health Act 1983 and the Mental Capacity Act 2005. It applies to people in England and Wales. Most of the Act was implemented on 3 November 2008.
  - It introduces significant changes which include: 1. Introduction of Supervised Community Treatment, including Community Treatment Orders (CTOs). This new power replaces supervised discharge with a power to return the patient to hospital, where the person may be forcibly medicated, if the medication regime is not being complied with in the community. 2. Redefining professional roles: broadening the range of mental health professionals who can be responsible for the treatment of patients without their consent. 3. Creating the role of approved clinician, which is a registered healthcare professional (social worker, nurse, psychologist or occupational therapist) approved by the appropriate authority to act for purposes of the Mental Health Act 1983 (as amended). 4. Replacing the role of approved social worker by the role of approved mental health professional; the person fulfilling this role need not be a social worker. 5. Nearest relative: making it possible for some patients to appoint a civil partner as nearest relative. 6. Definition of mental disorder: introduce a new definition of mental disorderthroughout the Act, abolishing previous categories 7. Criteria for Involuntary commitment: introduce a requirement that someone cannot be detained for treatment unless appropriate treatment is available and removes the treatability test. 8. Mental Health Review Tribunal (MHRT): improve patient safeguards by taking an order-making power which will allow the current time limit to be varied and for automatic referral by hospital managers to the MHRT. 9. Introduction of independent mental health advocates (IMHAs) for 'qualifying patients'. 10. Electroconvulsive Therapy may not be given to a patient who has capacity to refuse consent to it, and may only be given to an incapacitated patient where it does not conflict with any advance directive, decision of a donee or deputy or decision of the Court of Protection.
- 2008 – The whole mental health tribunal system in England changed in 2008. As a result, in England, the Mental Health Review Tribunal as a standalone process was technically abolished and became one part of a Health and Social Care Chamber of a newly established national level of hearings called the First-tier Tribunal. It is now technically known as the First-tier Tribunal (Mental Health), but in practice is often called the Mental Health Tribunal. A new Upper Tribunal was also created, which hears appeals against decisions by the First-tier. In Wales, the tribunal is still the Mental Health Review Tribunal for Wales.
- 2009 – Until 2009 in England and Wales, the Mental Health Act 1983 allowed the use of ECT on detained patients whether or not they had capacity to consent to it. However, following amendments which took effect in 2009, ECT may not generally be given to a patient who has capacity and refuses it, irrespective of his or her detention under the Act. However, there is an exception regardless of consent and capacity; under Section 62 of the Act, if the treating psychiatrist says the need for treatment is urgent they may start a course of ECT without authorization.
- 2009: Debbie Purdy, a British music journalist and political activist from Bradford, West Yorkshire with primary progressive multiple sclerosis, challenged the law in England and Wales as it relates to assisted suicide. On 20 September 2009, it was announced that guidelines on assisted suicide law would be published by the UK Government. The guidelines for England and Wales "come after a legal battle won by Debbie Purdy", as "Law Lords accepted earlier this year that [Purdy] had a right to know whether her husband would be prosecuted if he helped her to travel abroad to commit suicide."

== 2010s ==
- 2010 – The Mental Health (Wales) Measure 2010 is a piece of legislation introduced to Wales by Health Minister Edwina Hart for both Health and Social Services. The measure was passed by the National Assembly for Wales on 2 November 2010.
- 2010 – An unofficial Disability History Month is first observed by participating individuals and organizations in 2010, and annually scheduled to run from November 22 to December 22.
- 2010 – The Disability Discrimination (Transport Vehicles) Regulations (Northern Ireland) 2009 came into operation on 25 January 2010. These regulations lift the exemption which applied to transport providers from Part 3 of the DDA. This means that from 25 January 2010 transport providers must not discriminate against disabled people when providing goods, facilities, and services.
- 2010 – The Equality Act 2010 was passed in the United Kingdom. The primary purpose of the act is to consolidate the complicated and numerous array of acts and regulations which formed the basis of anti-discrimination law in Great Britain.
- 2011 – AH v West London Mental Health Trust was a landmark case in England, which established a legal precedent in 2011 when Albert Laszlo Haines (AH), a patient in Broadmoor Hospital, a high security psychiatric hospital, was able to exercise a right to a fully open and public mental health review tribunal to hear his appeal for release. The case and the legal principles it affirmed have been described as opening up the secret world of tribunals and National Health Service secure units, and as having substantial ramifications for mental health professionals and solicitors, though how frequently patients will be willing or able to exercise the right is not yet clear. The detention of Haines under the Mental Health Act had been continuous since 1986, mainly at Broadmoor Hospitalrun by West London Mental Health NHS Trust. The tribunal panel ultimately decided there were sufficient grounds for continued psychiatric detention but recommended better collaborative work towards psychiatric rehabilitation and gradual supported pathways to lower security then release to community mental health services.
- 2012 – The government of England announced a £2.6 million fund from 2012 until March 2014 to help people with disabilities become MPs, councillors, and police and crime commissioners.
- 2013 – The Mental Health (Discrimination) Act 2013 (introduced into Parliament as the Mental Health (Discrimination) (No. 2) Bill) is an Act of Parliament of the United Kingdom which has four sections. Section 1 ("Members of Parliament etc") removes from the Mental Health Act 1983 the provision that disqualifies from the House of Commons a member sectioned for over six months under that Act. Section 2 ("Jurors") qualifies the restrictions of jury members who are receiving mental health treatment. Section 3 ("Company directors") modifies Regulations in relation to the employment of director's appointments. The final section gives the Secretary of State power to determine when the section relating to juries take effect; the other provisions came into force with Royal Assent.
- 2014 – R v Golds provides a recent authority from the Court of Appeal Criminal Division on how the courts will interpret the term 'substantial' in regard to the Homicide Act 1957 of the United Kingdom. At paragraph [55] of Elias LJ's judgment (following the paragraphing from the neutral citation given below) two senses of the word 'substantial' are identified: (i) something substantial is more than something which is merely trivial or minimal owing to the fact that it has "substance", or (ii) something substantial is big or large (e.g. in the sense that a substantial salary is a large one). At paragraph [72] Elias LJ concludes by opining that the court should (i) leave interpretation of the word 'substantial' to the jury, but if asked for further help should (ii) direct them under the second meaning of the term (i.e. substantial meaning big).
- 2015 – The Court of Protection of the United Kingdom ruled that a woman with six children and an IQ of 70 should be sterilized for her own safety because another pregnancy would have been a "significantly life-threatening event" for her and the fetus.
- 2018 – The Supreme Court of the United Kingdom ruled in An NHS Trust and others (Respondents) v Y (by his litigation friend, the Official Solicitor) and another (Appellants) that legal permission was not required to withdraw treatment from patients in a permanent vegetative state.
