= Insanity in English law =

Defense in English criminal law

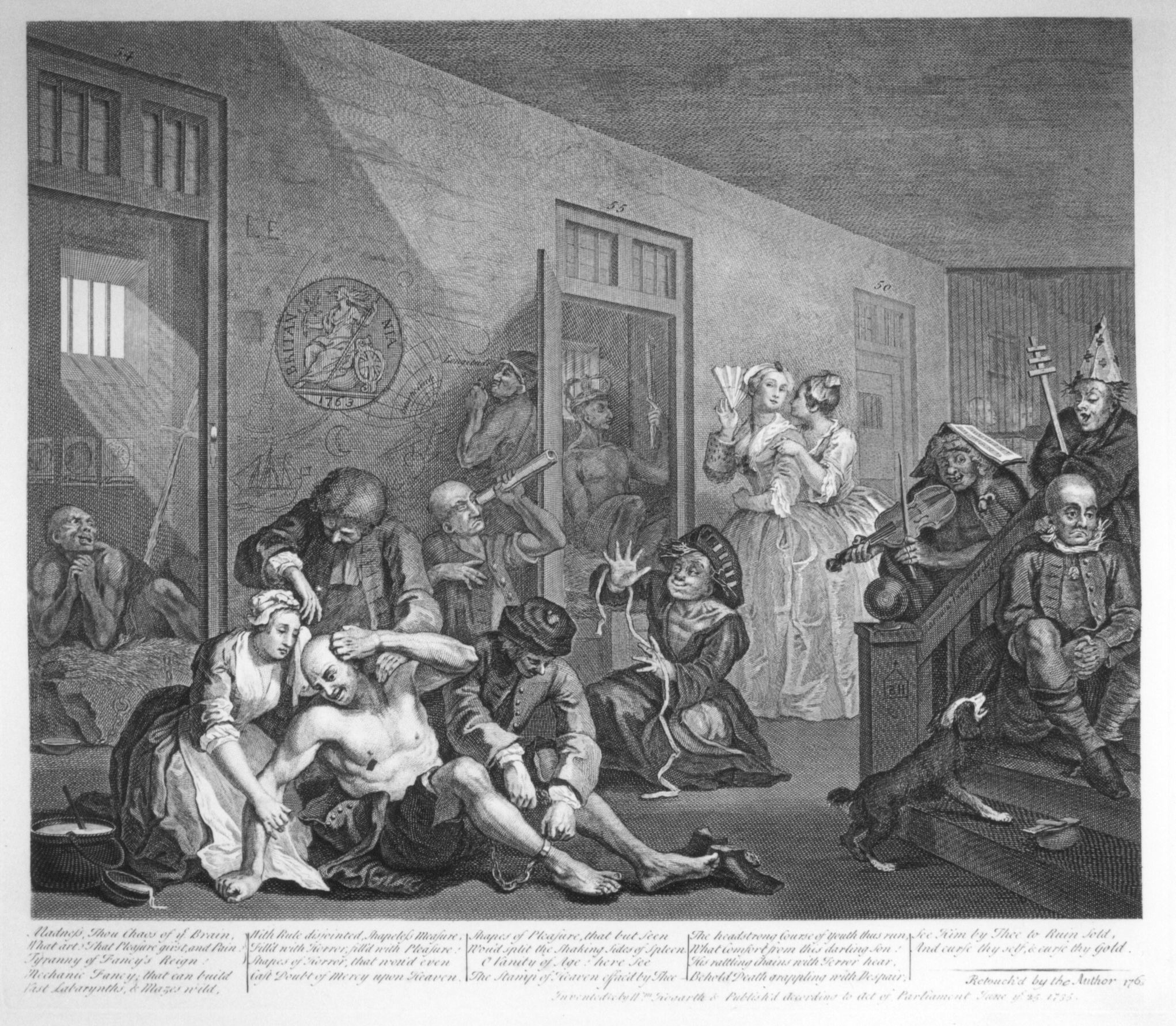
William Hogarth's A Rake's Progress, depicting the world's oldest psychiatric hospital, Bethlem Hospital

Insanity in English law is a defence to criminal charges based on the idea that the defendant was unable to understand what he was doing, or, that he was unable to understand that what he was doing was wrong.

The defence comes in two forms; where the defendant claims he was insane at the time of the crime, and where the defendant asserts he is insane at the time of trial. In the first situation, the defendant must show that he was either suffering from a disease which damaged the functioning of the mind and led to a defect of reason that prevented him from understanding what he was doing, or that he could not tell that what he was doing was wrong. In the second situation, the test is whether or not the defendant can differentiate between "guilty" and "not guilty" verdicts, instruct counsel and recognise the charges he is facing. If successful, he is likely to be detained under the Criminal Procedure (Insanity) Act 1964, although judges have a wide discretion as to what to do.

Use of insanity as a concept dates from 1324, and its criminal application was used until the late 16th century in an almost identical way. The defence, if successful, either allowed the defendant to return home or led to him being incarcerated until he was granted a royal pardon; after 1542, a defendant who became insane prior to the trial could not be tried for any crime, up to and including high treason. During the 18th century the test to determine insanity became extremely narrow, with defendants required to prove that they could not distinguish between good and evil and that they suffered from a mental disease which made them incapable of understanding the consequences of their actions. The current wording comes from the M'Naghten Rules, based on the trial of Daniel M'Naghten in 1843.

The defence of insanity has been subject to intense criticism, particularly from the Butler Committee, which noted that the rules were "based on too limited a concept of the nature of mental disorder", highlighting "the outmoded language of the M'Naghten Rules which gives rise to problems of interpretation" and that the rules were "based on the now obsolete belief in the pre-eminent role of reason in controlling social behaviour... [the rules] are not therefore a satisfactory test of criminal responsibility". The Committee proposed reform of the law in 1975, followed by a draft bill from the Law Commission in 1989; so far, these have both been ignored by successive governments.

== History ==
The idea of insanity in English law dates from 1324, when the Statute de Praerogativa Regis allowed the King to take the lands of "idiots and lunatics." The early law used various words, including "idiot", "fool" and "sot" to refer to those who had been insane since birth, and "lunatic" for those who had later become insane, or were insane with some lucid intervals. In the criminal law, insanity was used as a defence in a roughly identical way from this point until the late 16th century; if an insane person commits a crime, he was not punished in the same way that a sane felon who committed the same crime would be. This was for several reasons; firstly, the cruel punishment usually meted out to felons to set an example would not have the same effect on the insane. Secondly, as felonies required a mens rea, an insane person could not be guilty because they did not have the capacity to hold a mens rea. Thirdly, the phrase furiosus solo fitrere punitur was used; "a lunatic was punished by his madness alone".

In many cases, the insane defendant was released and allowed to go home; in some, he was held in prison until the King decided to grant him a pardon. A lunatic who became insane prior to the trial could not be executed, nor, after 1542, trialed for felonies up to and including high treason. It was then established that somebody found not guilty due to insanity should be immediately released; up until the beginning of the 19th century, this was almost all that could be done, although the Vagrancy Act 1744 allowed two Justices of the Peace to confine a dangerous lunatic. The test of insanity was extremely narrow; defendants had to prove that they were incapable of distinguishing between good and evil, and, following the trial of John Firth in 1790, that they suffered from a mental disease which made them incapable of "forming a judgment upon the consequences of [their] actions".

=== Trial of James Hadfield ===
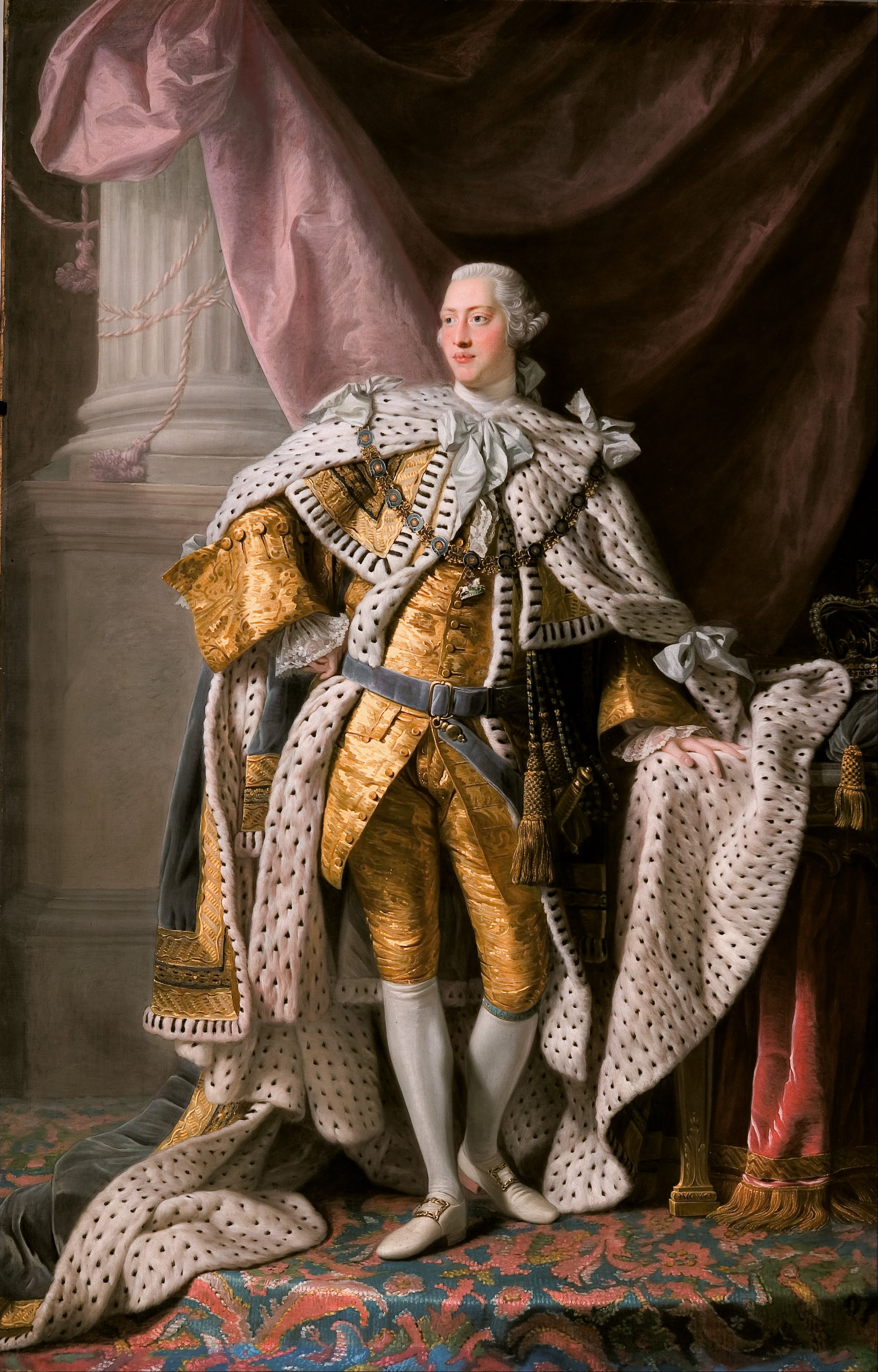
George III, who James Hadfield attempted to assassinate.

On 15 May 1800, James Hadfield attempted to assassinate George III; he had come to believe that the second coming of Christ would be brought about by his own death, and therefore attempted to be judicially executed. Hadfield approached the King in the royal box at the Theatre Royal, Drury Lane, firing a pistol at him; however, the King was bowing to the audience at the time, and the shot passed over his head. He was tried on 26 June 1800 at the Court of King's Bench, and his counsel, Thomas Erskine, argued that although Hadfield's planning of the attack meant that the normal defence of insanity would not have been sufficient, the true test of insanity is delusions and "frenzy or raving madness", which Hadfield suffered from. Several medical experts testified that Hadfield's injuries at the Battle of Tourcoing, where he was repeatedly struck in the head by a sabre, had caused insanity, and Lord Kenyon immediately sent the jury away to reach a decision. Their verdict was "not guilty; he being under the influence of insanity at the time the act was committed", the first time a jury had been asked to give a reason for their decision and the origins of the phrase "not guilty by reason of insanity".

The result of the case was the Criminal Lunatics Act 1800; Parliament, concerned that similar criminals could be allowed to go free, provided that somebody found "not guilty by reason of insanity" should be remanded in custody until granted a royal pardon. The 1800 Act also put limits on what crimes a defence of insanity could be used for. Prior to the Act, it could be used in any case, but the new legislation limited the defence to indictable offences.

=== The M'Naghten Case ===
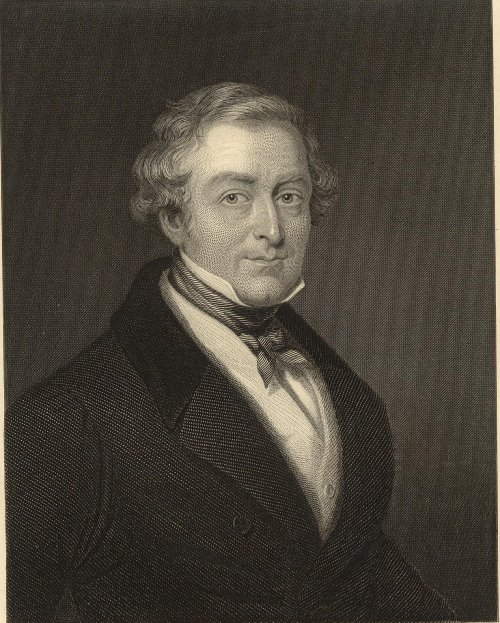
Robert Peel; it is believed he was Daniel M'Naghten's intended target.

On 20 January 1843, Daniel M'Naghten attempted to assassinate Robert Peel, Prime Minister of the United Kingdom. Approaching a man he believed to be Peel, M'Naghten fired into his back, in fact killing Edward Drummond, Peel's secretary. Immediately arrested, he was charged with murder and tried on 3 March 1843 at the Old Bailey. He was assisted in his defence by two solicitors, four barristers including Alexander Cockburn and nine medical experts, along with eight lay witnesses. Both sides agreed that M'Naghten was insane; the question was what constituted a valid legal defence of insanity. The judges decided that "every man is presumed to be sane, and to possess a sufficient degree of reason to be responsible for his crimes, until the contrary be proved to their satisfaction; and that to establish a defence on the ground of insanity, it must be clearly proved that, at the time of the committing of the act, the party accused was labouring under such a defect of reason, from disease of the mind, as not to know the nature and quality of the act he was doing; or, if he did know it, that he did not know what he was doing was wrong", which was boiled down to "did the defendant know what he was doing, and if so, that what he was doing was wrong?". This established the M'Naghten Rules, which remain the principal method of deciding insanity in English law.

=== Trial of Lunatics Act 1883 ===
The Trial of Lunatics Act 1883 was the next development in the law, allowing the jury to return a verdict that the defendant was guilty, but insane at the time, and should be kept in custody as a "criminal lunatic". This Act was passed at the request of Queen Victoria, who, the target of frequent attacks by mentally ill individuals, demanded that the verdict be changed from "not guilty" so as to act as a deterrent to other lunatics; the phrasing of "guilty of the act or omission charged, but insane so as not to be responsible, according to law, for his actions." remained in use until the Criminal Procedure (Insanity) Act 1964.

== Current law ==
Under the current law there are two applications of the insanity defence; where it is claimed that the defendant was insane at the time that they committed the crime, and where it is claimed that they were insane at the time of the trial and thus unable to effectively defend himself. The defence is most commonly used in the Crown Court, since it was previously believed that it required a jury; in DPP v Harper [1997], it was decided that the defence could also be applied in a magistrates' court.

=== Insanity at the time of the crime ===
Where the defendant is alleged to have been insane at the time of committing the offence, this issue can be raised in one of three ways; the defendant can claim he was insane, the defendant can raise a defence of automatism where the judge decides it was instead insanity, or the defendant can raise a plea of diminished responsibility, where the judge or prosecution again show that insanity is more appropriate. Whatever the way in which a plea of insanity is reached, the same test is used each time, as laid out in the M'Naghten Rules; "to establish a defence on the ground of insanity, it must be clearly proved that, at the time of the committing of the act, the party accused was labouring under such a defect of reason, from disease of the mind, as not to know the nature and quality of the act he was doing; or, if he did know it, that he did not know what he was doing was wrong".

"Disease of the mind" is not a medical term; it instead means that the defendant must show he was suffering from a disease which affected the functioning of the mind, which does not necessarily have to be a disease of the brain. This was confirmed in the case of R v Kemp [1957] 1 QB 399, where the defendant's arteriosclerosis led to him assaulting his wife while unconscious. It must then be shown that this disease of the mind led to a "defect of reason"; that the defendant's ability to reason was impaired by the disease. Alternately, the defendant can try to show that he did not know "the nature or quality of his act or that it was wrong". The first requires proof that the defendant did not know what he was doing; that he had no awareness of what he was happening, that he was unaware of the consequences of his act or that he knew what he was doing, but was deluded as to the circumstances; for the latter, Jonathan Herring gives the example of a man who "thought he was killing a monstrous person when he was in fact killing a person". When arguing that the defendant was "not knowing the act was wrong", "wrong" is taken to mean "illegal", as set out in R v Windle [1952] 2 QB 826.

=== Insanity at the time of the trial ===
If a defendant at the time of trial claims he is insane, this hinges on whether or not he is able to understand the charge, the difference between "guilty" and "not guilty" and is able to instruct his lawyers. If he is unable to do these things, he can be found "unfit to plead" under Section 4 of the Criminal Procedure (Insanity) Act 1964. In that situation, the judge has wide discretion as to what to do with the defendant, except in cases of murder, where he must be detained in hospital.

== Criticism and attempted reform ==
The law in this area is often criticised because it sets a legal standard for insanity that does not match the medical understanding of insanity and mental health and leads to decisions that are not reasonable from a medical point of view. In R v Quick and Paddison [1973] QB 910, for example, the courts decided that an assault committed when the defendant was suffering from hypoglycemia due to the taking of insulin was not insane in nature, while in R v Hennsey [1989] 1 WLR 287 it was held that a crime committed while the defendant was suffering from hyperglycemia did constitute insanity. As a result, the existing law allows some diabetics to be acquitted while others are declared insane, something one academic describes as "absurd". In R v Sullivan, a man was charged with grievous bodily harm under the Offences against the Person Act 1861 after assaulting his friend during an epileptic seizure. The House of Lords ruled that Sullivan was indeed insane, and that "it does not lie within the power of the courts to alter [the insanity test]". Some critics have professed "unease" at the powers of the courts to confine people found not guilty by reason of insanity in mental hospitals, arguing that discussion of mental health should be limited to the mens rea of the crime; if the mental condition of the defendant voided the offence's mens rea, he should be acquitted.

The Butler Committee's report in 1975 submitted the law of insanity to intense criticism, saying that it is "based on too limited a concept of the nature of mental disorder", noting "the outmoded language of the M'Naghten Rules which gives rise to problems of interpretation" and that the rules were "based on the now obsolete belief in the pre-eminent role of reason in controlling social behaviour... [the rules] are not therefore a satisfactory test of criminal responsibility". An additional criticism given is that the defence puts the burden of proof onto the defendant, while in all other cases the burden is on the prosecution. The Butler Committee proposed reform, which was repeatedly ignored by successive governments; the Law Commission drafted a Criminal Code Bill in 1989 which altered the rules on insanity, but this was again ignored.

== Bibliography ==
- Clarkson, C.M.V.; H.M. Keating; S.R. Cunningham (2007). Clarkson and Keating Criminal Law: Texts and Materials (6th ed.). Sweet & Maxwell. ISBN 978-0-421-94780-1.
- Crotty, Homer D. (1924). "The History of Insanity as a Defence to Crime in English Criminal Law". California Law Review. 12 (2). University of California, Berkeley School of Law. doi:10.2307/3475205. ISSN 0008-1221. JSTOR 3475205.
- Herring, Jonathan (2008). Criminal Law: Texts, Cases and Materials (3rd ed.). Oxford University Press. ISBN 978-0-19-923432-5.
- Jones, Timothy (1995). "Insanity, automatism, and the burden of proof on the accused". Law Quarterly Review. 111 (3). Sweet & Maxwell. ISSN 0023-933X.
- Moran, Richard (1985). "The Modern Foundation for the Insanity Defense: The Cases of James Hadfield (1800) and Daniel McNaughtan (1843)". Annals of the American Academy of Political and Social Science. 477. American Academy of Political and Social Science: 31–42. doi:10.1177/0002716285477001004. ISSN 0002-7162.
- Ward, Tony (1997). "Magistrates, insanity and the common law". Criminal Law Review. Sweet & Maxwell. ISSN 0011-135X.
- White, Stephen (1985). "The Insanity Defense in England and Wales Since 1843". Annals of the American Academy of Political and Social Science. 477 (477). American Academy of Political and Social Science: 43–57. doi:10.1177/0002716285477001005. ISSN 0002-7162. PMID 11616556.
