= State v. Crenshaw =

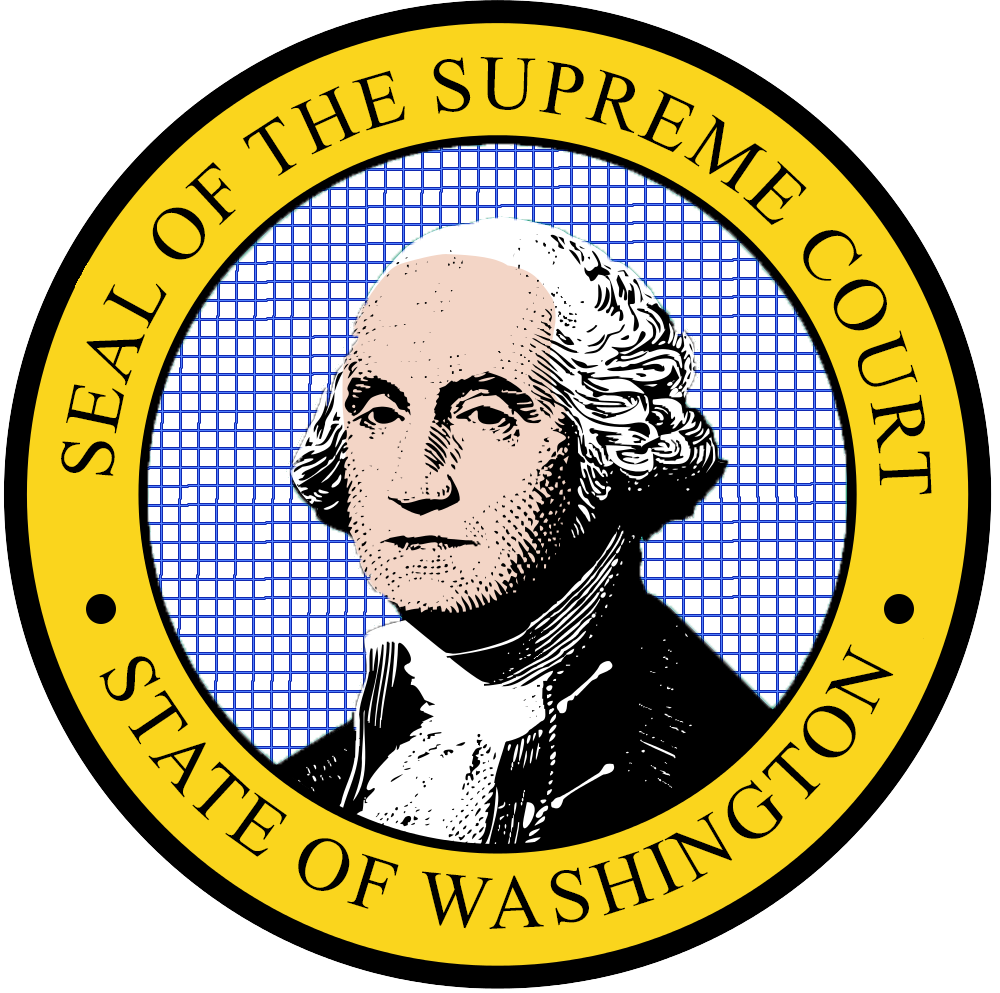
- Court: Washington Supreme Court
- Decided: February 17, 1983
- Citations: 98 Wash. 2d 789; 659 P.2d 488

Court membership
- Judges sitting: Robert Brachtenbach, Hugh J. Rosellini, Charles F. Stafford, Carolyn R. Dimmick, Vernon Robert Pearson, William H. Williams, Fred H. Dore

Case opinions
- Decision by: Brachtenbach
- Concurrence: Williams
- Dissent: Dore

Keywords
- Insanity defense

State v. Crenshaw, 98 Wash. 2d 789, 659 P.2d 488 (1983), is a criminal case interpreting the relationship of the insanity defense to a deific decree. The Supreme Court of Washington carved out the deific exception from the standard set forth in People v. Schmidt (1915), that a person can be found not guilty by reason of insanity even if they knew their act was morally wrong by the standards of society and wrong under the law, if their mental disorder was a delusion that God commanded their act. A mother insanely killed her child in the delusional belief that she was obeying God's command. It was found that "it would be unrealistic to hold her responsible for the crime, since her free will has been subsumed by her belief in the deific decree.
