= Ronald Butt =

British journalist (1920–2002)

Ronald Herbert Butt, CBE (17 February 1920 – 13 December 2002) was a British journalist who wrote a political column for The Times from 1968 to 1991 and was the author of two books on Parliament.

== Early life and education ==
Butt was born and grew up in south London, the son of Herbert Butt and Elizabeth Clare Butt (née Morley). He was educated at St Dunstan's College, London. Before the outbreak of the Second World War he held pacifist views and had to wrestle with his conscience before deciding to join the Army. He served in the Intelligence Corps and took part in the Normandy campaign after D-Day. After the war, he read history at St Catherine's College, Oxford, where he gained a first. He embarked on postgraduate research at Oxford but decided instead on a career as a journalist.

== Career ==
Butt joined the Financial Times in 1951 where, after a spell as a commodities correspondent, he became a political correspondent and eventually political editor. A former colleague, Sir Geoffrey Owen, described Butt as "having added another dimension to the FT with sophisticated, highly intelligent commentary and reportage". In 1967 Butt joined The Sunday Times as a political columnist, assistant editor and leader writer. In 1983 he moved to its sister paper The Times as associate editor and leader writer.

Butt was best known for the weekly personal column he wrote for The Times between 1968 and 1991, commentating on British politics. He wrote from a conservative standpoint but criticised Mrs Thatcher’s government for the introduction of the poll tax. He also criticised policies that he saw as undermining family life. He retired in 1991.

From 1964-65 he was a resident research fellow at Nuffield College, Oxford, where he worked on his first book The Power of Parliament published in 1967. This assessed the function of Parliament in contemporary British politics and questioned the prevailing view that the power of the House of Commons had declined. It argued that the Commons had rarely made or unmade governments in the past, and that back-bench MPs were still able to influence governments. Regarded as an important contribution to the debate on Parliament’s role, it was mentioned in parliamentary debate.

His second book A History of Parliament: The Middle Ages was published in 1989 and it was the first history to describe in narrative form Parliament’s development throughout the Middle Ages. It emphasised the political impetus behind Parliament’s growth. He was working on a second volume at the time of his death.

Butt was a member of the Butler Committee on Mentally Abnormal Offenders from 1972–75 and was a member of the Council of Westfield College, University of London, from 1971-1989. He was also involved in the work of Family and Youth Concern (which became the Family Education Trust).

He was appointed CBE in 1987.

== Personal life ==
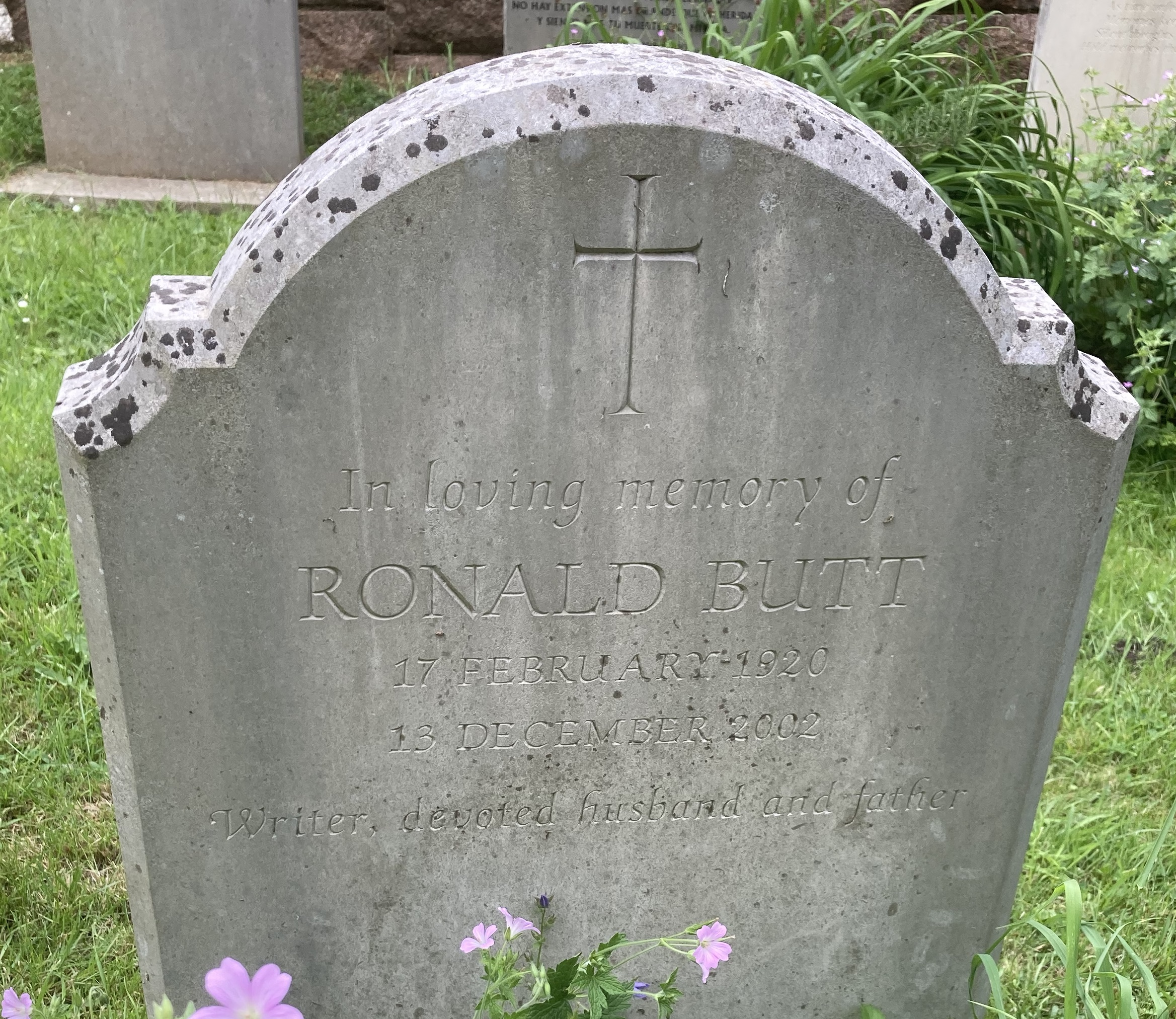
Grave of Ronald Butt in Highgate Cemetery

He was married to Margaret Chaundy, daughter of mathematician Theodore William Chaundy and Hilda Chaundy, and they had two sons and two daughters. He died on 13th December, 2002, and was buried on the eastern side of Highgate Cemetery.

== Books ==
- The Power of Parliament, Constable, London 1967, ISBN 0094502714
- A History of Parliament: The Middle Ages, Constable, London 1989, ISBN 0094562202
