= Graham Young =

English serial killer

- Born: Graham Frederick Young; 7 September 1947; Neasden, Middlesex, England, UK
- Died: 1 August 1990 (aged 42); HMP Parkhurst, Isle of Wight, England, UK
- Other name: The Teacup Poisoner

Details
- Victims: 3 known and confirmed
- Span of crimes: 1961–1971
- Country: England
- Date apprehended: 23 May 1962 (first arrest); 20 November 1971 (second arrest)

Graham Frederick Young (7 September 1947 – 1 August 1990), also known as the Teacup Poisoner, was an English serial killer who murdered his victims with poison.

Obsessed with poisons from an early age, Young poisoned the food and drink of relatives and school friends. He was caught when his teacher became suspicious and contacted police. Young pleaded guilty to three non-fatal poisonings and, at age 14, was detained at Broadmoor Hospital. He later took responsibility for the death of his stepmother, though this has not been proven.

After being released in 1971, Young found a job in a factory in Bovingdon, Hertfordshire, where he poisoned some of his colleagues, resulting in two deaths and several critical illnesses. He was convicted on two counts of murder and two counts of attempted murder in 1972. Young served most of his life sentence at Parkhurst Prison, where he died of a heart attack in 1990.

Young's case made headlines in the United Kingdom and led to a public debate over the release of mentally ill offenders. Within hours of his conviction, the British government announced two inquiries into the issues his trial had raised. The Butler Committee led to widespread reforms in mental health services, while the passage of the Poisons Act 1972 put severe restrictions on the purchase of deadly poisons. Young's life story inspired the film The Young Poisoner's Handbook (1995).

== Early life and crimes ==
Graham Young was born on 7 September 1947 to Frederick and Bessie Young in Neasden, Middlesex; he had an older sister, Winifred. After his mother died of tuberculosis when he was fourteen weeks old, Young was sent to live with an uncle and aunt while his sister went to live with their grandparents. Several years later, Young's father married his stepmother, Molly Young, and the family were reunited.

Young was fascinated from an early age by poisons and their effects, and considered Victorian poisoner William Palmer to be a personal hero. He also read extensively about black magic and Nazism. In 1959, he attended John Kelly Boys' School, where he read books on advanced toxicology.

In early 1961, Young acquired antimony from a local chemist, signing the poisons register in the name "M.E. Evans"; his knowledge of poisons and chemistry convinced the chemist that he was older than he appeared. From February, he poisoned members of his family. First, his stepmother Molly suffered vomiting, diarrhea and excruciating stomach pain, which she initially dismissed as bilious attacks. Before long, his father suffered similar stomach cramps, debilitating him for days at a time. Soon after, Young's sister became sick on two occasions over the summer. Shortly afterwards, Young himself fell violently ill. It even seemed as if the mystery bug had spread beyond their household: a couple of Young's school friends had similarly been repeatedly absent from school, both suffering from similar symptoms.

In November 1961, Young's sister was served a cup of tea by her brother one morning but found its taste so sour she took only one mouthful before she threw it away. While on the train to work an hour later, she hallucinated, had to be helped out of the station and was eventually taken to hospital, where doctors came to the conclusion that she had somehow been exposed to the poisonous Atropa belladonna. Young was confronted by his father, but he claimed that she had been using the family's teacups to mix shampoo. Unconvinced, Young's father searched his room but found nothing incriminating. Nevertheless, he warned his son to be more careful in future when "messing about with those bloody chemicals."

On Easter Saturday, 21 April 1962, Young's stepmother died. Her death was attributed to a prolapsed cervical disc, which was believed to have resulted from a road accident. Much later, Young told police that he poisoned her with a lethal dose of thallium. At her wake, Young poisoned a male relative after lacing a jar of mustard pickle with antimony. Shortly afterwards, his father became seriously ill and was taken to hospital, where he was told that he was suffering from antimony poisoning and one more dose would have killed him. Young's aunt, who knew of his fascination with poisons, became suspicious, as did a science teacher who discovered several bottles of poison in his school desk. The teacher and the headmaster arranged for Young to be interviewed by a psychiatrist posing as a careers adviser, who contacted police after Young revealed his extensive knowledge of poisons and toxicology.

Young was arrested on 23 May 1962 after returning home from school. Vials of thallium and antimony were found in his possession. When questioned by police, he confessed to poisoning his father, stepmother, sister and a school friend. Psychiatrist Dr Christopher Fysh testified that Young had a psychopathic disorder rather than a mental illness and had failed "to develop a normal moral sense." He felt it was "extremely likely" that Young would re-offend and recounted a conversation in which Young said: "I am missing my antimony. I miss the power it gives me." Fysh recommended that Young be detained at Broadmoor Hospital in Berkshire, an institution for patients with mental disorders who have committed criminal offences. Dr Donald Blair, another psychiatrist, concurred with Fysh's viewpoint.

Young pleaded guilty to three charges of poisoning his father, sister and school friend and was convicted of "malicious administration of a noxious thing to inflict grievous bodily harm." He was not charged for murdering his stepmother, as her autopsy report did not list poison as the cause of death. The judge, Justice Melford Stevenson, ruled that Young was to be detained under Section 60 of the Mental Health Act at Broadmoor. Furthermore, he was not to be released for fifteen years without the approval of the Home Secretary.

== Broadmoor ==
At age 14, Young was among the youngest-ever inmates in Broadmoor's history. Soon after his arrival, John Berridge, a fellow inmate, died of cyanide poisoning. Young was suspected by some staff and inmates, not least because he enjoyed explaining in detail how cyanide could be extracted from laurel leaves; the grounds around Broadmoor were covered with laurel bushes. However, his involvement was never proven and Berridge's death was officially ruled a suicide. Later, Harpic was found in a nurse's coffee and the contents of a missing packet of sugar soap were discovered in a tea urn.

Young continued to read medical and toxicology textbooks, obtained from Broadmoor's library. He also continued his interest in Nazism, reading William Shirer's The Rise and Fall of the Third Reich and Lord Russell's The Scourge of the Swastika. At one point, Young grew a toothbrush moustache, took to mimicking the speeches of Adolf Hitler and listened to musical compositions by Richard Wagner, who had been one of Hitler's idols.

In 1965, Young first applied for release from Broadmoor. His father and sister attended the hearing and stated that if he were released, none of his relatives would be willing to house him; his father also insisted that his son should "never be released." Young's application was rejected. Five years later, in June 1970, Broadmoor psychiatrist Edgar Udwin wrote to the Home Secretary to recommend Young's release, announcing that he was "no longer obsessed with poisons, violence and mischief. And he is no longer a danger to others." However, Young remarked to a Broadmoor nurse: "When I get out, I'm going to kill one person for every year I've spent in this place."

== Later crimes ==
Young was released from Broadmoor in 1971, after eight years' detention. He initially stayed with his sister and her husband in Hemel Hempstead. Within weeks he had resumed his interest in poisons, but an initial attempt to acquire poison from John Bell & Croyden in Wigmore Street was unsuccessful, as the chemist refused to sell them without written authorisation. Young duly returned with the required authorisation on Bedford College headed notepaper and was sold 25 g of antimony potassium tartrate. He told the chemist that he needed it for a qualitative and quantitative analysis. Young later returned to the same chemist to purchase 25 g of thallium.

=== Poisoning of Trevor Sparkes ===
Young attended a storekeeping training course in Slough and stayed at a hostel in nearby Cippenham. He befriended 34-year-old Trevor Sparkes, another resident of the hostel, and the two occasionally visited a pub together or shared a bottle of wine in Sparkes' room. Young would later confess to poisoning Sparkes with antimony sodium tartrate. On the night of February 10, Sparkes fell violently ill, exhibiting diarrhoea, pins and needles in his legs and pains in his testicles; earlier in the evening he had accepted a glass of water from Young. Sparkes' symptoms returned periodically over the following months. He felt so ill during a football match that he had to leave the pitch after a few minutes. Specialists were unable to pinpoint the cause, variously diagnosing it as a kidney infection, bowel infection, urinary tract infection or stomach infection. Sparkes left Slough in April 1971 and gradually recovered.

=== Bovingdon ===
Young secured a job as assistant storekeeper at John Hadland Laboratories in Bovingdon, Hertfordshire, near his sister's home in Hemel Hempstead. The company manufactured thallium bromide-iodide infrared lenses, which were used in military equipment. However, no thallium was stored on site, necessitating Young obtaining his supplies of the poison from a London chemist. On his application, Young falsely claimed that his lack of employment history was because he had suffered a nervous breakdown following the death of his mother in a car accident. His employers received references as part of his rehabilitation from Broadmoor, but were not informed that he was a convicted poisoner and a former Broadmoor patient. Young left Slough and rented a room in Maynard Road, Hemel Hempstead, at £4 per week.

Young's new colleagues found him unpredictable; he could be surly and keep to himself, but on other days he could be more cheerful. During breaks, he usually sat alone reading, invariably a book on one of his favourite subjects: war, chemistry, the Nazis or famous murderers. Young was not talkative unless one of his favourite topics was being discussed. His duties at Hadland included collecting drinks from the tea trolley in the corridor and bringing them to the storeroom. Each employee had their own mug, which made it easier for him to target specific individuals for poisoning.

Soon after Young's arrival at Hadland, he poisoned some of his co-workers, focusing on his immediate colleagues in the storerooms. His modus operandi was to slip poison, usually antimony or thallium, into their tea or coffee. Victims would fall ill with symptoms that included vomiting, stomach pains, nausea and diarrhea. Initially, the mysterious illness was assumed to be a virus and was nicknamed the "Bovingdon Bug." Other explanations put forward were contamination of the local water supply and radioactivity from a disused airfield nearby.

=== Murder of Bob Egle ===
Young's first victim in Bovingdon was 59-year-old Bob Egle, a storeroom manager at Hadland and Young's immediate superior. Egle, a veteran of the Dunkirk evacuation, was often asked by Young about his wartime experiences. He fell ill in June 1971, weeks after Young's arrival at the company, taking several days off work with diarrhea and severe stomach pains. His health improved after a week-long holiday, but on his return Young put a lethal dose of thallium in his afternoon tea. Egle's condition deteriorated rapidly from this point, consisting of intense back pain and numbness in his fingers and feet. He was transferred to the intensive care unit at St Albans City Hospital, where paralysis set in. Young seemingly showed a strong concern for Egle, repeatedly contacting the hospital for updates on his progress. Egle finally died on 7 July 1971. A post-mortem attributed Egle's death to a rare form of polyneuritis known as Guillain–Barré syndrome.

Young was chosen to accompany managing director Godfrey Foster to Egle's funeral as a representative of the department Egle had managed. Foster recalled Young remarking how sad it was that "Bob should come through the terrors of Dunkirk only to fall victim to some strange virus."

=== Poisoning of Ron Hewitt and Diana Smart ===
During Egle's absences, Young targeted Egle's assistant Ron Hewitt, poisoning his tea with antimony. Hewitt had already accepted a job at another company and was working his notice (Young was specifically hired as his replacement). After leaving the company, he suffered no further symptoms. As a result of Egle's death and Hewitt's departure, Young was promoted to head storeman for a probationary period. For the next few months, his poisonings were limited to small doses of antimony in his co-worker Diana Smart's tea, usually when she annoyed him. Young wrote in his diary: "Di [Diana Smart] irritated me yesterday so I packed her off home with an attack of sickness. I only gave her something to shake her up. I now regret that I didn't give her a larger dose, capable of laying her up for a few days."

=== Poisoning of David Tilson and Jethro Batt ===
On 8 October 1971, Young put thallium acetate in David Tilson's tea. Tilson found the tea too sweet for his liking (Young had added sugar to disguise any unusual taste from the thallium) and therefore did not drink it all. Young administered a second dose of thallium a week later. Tilson was admitted to hospital with numb legs, breathing difficulties and chest pains. His skin was so tender he could not endure the weight of the bedsheets, and all his hair fell out. Young had a back-up plan to visit Tilson in hospital and offer him a bottle of brandy laced with more thallium. Subsequently, Tilson recovered, though he was left permanently impotent by the poisoning.

At the same time he was poisoning Tilson, Young also poisoned another Hadland employee, Jethro Batt. Batt had become friendly with Young and would give him a ride home to Hemel Hempstead. Young admitted to administering 4 g of thallium to Batt in two doses, enough to kill him. However, Batt found the coffee Young had made for him too strong and did not drink it all. Nevertheless, Batt was admitted to hospital with stomach and chest pains, and his hair fell out; the poisoning made him suicidal. Batt ultimately recovered, but like Tilson he was also left impotent. Young apparently felt some remorse for poisoning Batt, writing in his diary: "I feel rather ashamed in my action in harming J [Batt]."

=== Murder of Fred Biggs ===
Fred Biggs, a 56-year-old local councillor and part-time employee at Hadland, was poisoned by Young with antimony, prompting the typical "Bovingdon Bug" symptoms. Then, on 30 October 1971, Young put three doses of thallium acetate in Biggs' tea. By the following day, Biggs had developed chest pains and had trouble walking. Within days, he was admitted to Hemel Hempstead General Hospital, then transferred to the Whittington Hospital in North London, followed by the London National Hospital for Nervous Diseases (now part of the National Hospital for Neurology and Neurosurgery). His central nervous system deteriorated to the point that he could not speak and had trouble breathing, and parts of his skin peeled off. Young expressed concern for Biggs' condition, continually telephoning his wife and the hospital directly to make enquiries. Biggs finally died on 19 November 1971.

== Investigation and arrest ==
The management at Hadland became so concerned about the mysterious sickness that they initiated an investigation. Meanwhile, some of Young's co-workers became suspicious of him. Smart noticed that Young was never affected by the bug and suggested he might be a carrier of the "virus." Philip Doggett informed the management of Young's unhealthy interest in poisons. The firm's medical officer, Dr Iain Anderson, told staff that he had ruled out heavy metal poisoning as a possible cause, which led to an argument with Young, who insisted that the symptoms displayed by victims pointed to this diagnosis. Intrigued by the young storeman who seemed knowledgeable about medicine, Anderson sought out Young after the meeting and quizzed him further. He quickly discovered that Young had a deep knowledge of poisons and toxicology, which prompted John Hadland, the firm's owner, to contact police. Investigating officers noticed that the onset of the "Bovingdon Bug" coincided with Young's arrival at the company. A background check revealed his earlier poisoning convictions.

Young was arrested at the home of his aunt and uncle in Sheerness, Kent, on 20 November 1971. Nothing incriminating was found on his person. Young denied any wrongdoing, but as he was being led away his aunt overheard him ask the officers "which one is it you're doing me for?" When police searched his bedsit, they discovered a large stash of bottles containing poisons, including 434 milligrams of thallium and 32.33 grams of antimony, the latter 200 times a lethal dose. Other poisons in his possession included atropine, aconitine and digitalis. His lodgings were also covered in Nazi paraphernalia, including swastikas and photos of Nazi figures. Police also discovered a detailed diary that Young had kept, noting the doses he had administered, their effects and whether he was going to allow each person to live or die. Upon further questioning by police, Young admitted that the initials in the diary referred to his co-workers ('F' was Fred Biggs, 'D' was David Tilson and so on).

Young confessed to poisoning Egle, Biggs, Batt, Tilson and Trevor Sparkes, and said that he deliberately used different poisons in order to confuse doctors. He also boasted of having committed the "perfect murder" by killing his stepmother. He spent twenty minutes explaining to the officers the effects of thallium on the human body. When asked why he had poisoned people who were his friends and colleagues, Young responded: "I suppose I had ceased to see them as a people - at least, a part of me had. They were simply guinea pigs."

== Trial and prison ==
Young was charged with two counts of murder, two counts of attempted murder, four counts of administering poison with intent to injure and four alternative counts of administering poison with intent to cause grievous bodily harm. He pleaded not guilty, which made it difficult to find a barrister willing to represent him; the trial date had to be postponed several times. Eventually, Sir Arthur Irvine QC agreed to defend Young. John Leonard QC led the prosecution for the Crown. The judge was Mr Justice Eveleigh. The trial was held at St Albans Crown Court and started on 19 June 1972.

Due to safeguards protecting defendants, the jury could not be told of Young's previous convictions for poisoning. Young retracted his earlier confession to the police, claiming he had only made it in order to get some rest. Nevertheless, the evidence against him was strong. The prosecution called seventy-five witnesses to give testimony; Young himself was the only witness in his defence. Excerpts from his diary were read out in court; he claimed the diary was a fantasy for a novel. Examination of Biggs' internal organs found thallium in his intestines, kidneys, muscles, bones and brain tissue. The cremated remains of Egle, which had not yet been scattered, were also analysed and found to contain 9 mg of thallium. The latter was the first instance of cremated ashes being used as evidence in a murder conviction.

On 29 June 1972, after one hour and thirty-eight minutes of deliberation, the jury found Young guilty of two counts of murder (Egle and Biggs), two counts of attempted murder (Batt and Tilson) and two counts of administering poison with intent to injure (Smart and Hewitt). He was found not guilty of administering poison to Sparkes and Buck, and was acquitted on all four counts of administering poison with intent to cause grievous bodily harm. Through his counsel, Young requested that he be sent to a conventional prison rather than return to Broadmoor. His request was granted and Young was sentenced to life imprisonment, to be served at Park Lane Hospital (later Ashworth Hospital) in Maghull.

While at Ashworth, Young befriended Moors murderer Ian Brady, with whom he shared a fascination for Nazism. Brady's 2001 book, The Gates of Janus, in which he discusses various serial killers, includes a chapter on Young. Brady wrote that Young "was genuinely asexual, finding even discussion of sexual matters not only uninteresting but also distinctly distasteful... Power and death were his aphrodisiacs and raisons d’être." Elsewhere Brady stated that "it was difficult not to empathise with Graham Young."

Young died in his cell at Parkhurst Prison on the evening of 1 August 1990, one month before his 43rd birthday. The cause of death was listed as myocardial infarction. As Young had no history of heart disease, it has been speculated that he either committed suicide or was murdered by prisoners or prison staff who did not feel safe around him. Young was cremated on 15 August and his ashes were scattered on a beach on 2 September.

== Aftermath ==
On 29 June 1972, the day Young's trial ended, Home Secretary Reginald Maudling gave a statement in the House of Commons about the issues raised by the case. He confirmed that more safeguards were to be introduced governing the release of mentally ill offenders. Henceforth, no patient at a special hospital was to be discharged without two concurring recommendations from psychiatrists. Supervision of released patients was also to be improved.

Maudling ordered a review of current procedures for releasing offenders from psychiatric hospitals. The review was to be carried out by a three-man committee headed by Sir Carl Aarvold, Recorder of London. Their findings were published in January 1973. Maudling also announced an inquiry to review the management of mentally ill offenders in the criminal justice system, to be chaired by Lord Butler. This led to the Butler Committee's recommendations in 1975, which resulted in the expansion in forensic mental health services with the development of regional (now referred to as medium) secure units in most of the health regions in England and Wales. Prior to that there had been only the three high security hospitals of Broadmoor, Ashworth and Rampton.

Following Young's conviction, reports of copycat poisonings appeared in the British press. In April 1973, Howard Grodnow of Ealing killed himself, having become convinced that he had been poisoned by Young after reading about the case. For the previous eighteen months he had suffered from severe chest pains, which he traced back to an encounter, in a Hemel Hempstead pub, with a young man obsessed with poisons and chemicals. In November 2005, a 16-year-old Japanese schoolgirl was arrested for poisoning her mother with thallium. She claimed to be fascinated by Young and kept an online blog, similar to Young's diary, recording dosage and reactions.

The Poisons Act 1972 was created to restrict and control the sale of poisons after Young's court case concluded.

== See also ==
- List of serial killers in the United Kingdom

== Sources ==
- Emsley, John (2005), The Elements of Murder: A History of Poison, OUP Oxford, ISBN 9780191517358
- Holden, Anthony (1995), The St Albans Poisoner, Corgi Books, ISBN 9780552144087
- Lloyd, Georgina (1990), With Malice Aforethought, Bantam Press, ISBN 978-0-553-40273-5
- Michael H. Stone, M.D. & Gary Brucato, Ph.D., The New Evil: Understanding the Emergence of Modern Violent Crime (Amherst, N.Y.: Prometheus Books), pp. 479–480. ISBN 978-1-63388-532-5.
