= Treason Act 1800 =

Act of the Parliament of Great Britain

Treason Act 1800 (Note: The citation of this act by this short title was authorised by section 1 of, and the first schedule to, the Short Titles Act 1896. Due to the repeal of those provisions it is now authorised by section 19(2) of the Interpretation Act 1978.)
- Act of Parliament
- Parliament of Great Britain
- Long title: An Act for regulating Trials for High Treason and Misprision of High Treason, in certain Cases.
- Citation: 39 & 40 Geo. 3 c. 93
- Territorial extent: Great Britain; Ireland

Dates
- Royal assent: 28 July 1800
- Commencement: 28 July 1800 (Note: The Acts of Parliament (Commencement) Act 1793.)
- Repealed: England and Wales: 1 January 1968; Northern Ireland: 1 January 1968; Scotland: 1 February 1981 (Note: The Criminal Justice (Scotland) Act 1980 (Commencement No. 1) Order 1981 (SI 1981/50).)
Other legislation
Amends	Treason Act 1547
Repealed by	England and Wales: Criminal Law Act 1967; Northern Ireland: Criminal Law Act (Northern Ireland) 1967; Scotland: Criminal Justice (Scotland) Act 1980
Relates to	Treason Act 1695; Treason Act 1708; Criminal Lunatics Act 1800; Treason Act 1842

Status: Repealed

Text of statute as originally enacted

The Treason Act 1800 (39 & 40 Geo. 3 c. 93) was an act of the Parliament of Great Britain that assimilated the procedure on trials for treason and misprision of treason to the procedure on trials for murder in certain cases. It was passed as a result of an attempt on the life of George III by James Hadfield earlier that year. The Criminal Lunatics Act 1800 (c. 94) was passed at the same time.

== Provisions ==
The act provided that in all cases of high treason which consisted of compassing or imagining the death of the king, or of misprision of that species of high treason, where the overt act (or acts) of that species of high treason alleged in the indictment for that offence was the assassination or killing of the King, or a direct attempt against his life, or a direct attempt against his person whereby his life might be endangered or his person might suffer bodily harm, the accused could be, and was to be, indicted, arraigned, tried and attainted, in same manner, and under the same procedure ("course and order of trial") and on the same evidence, as if he was charged with murder.

The act further provided that nothing in the Treason Act 1695 (7 & 8 Will. 3. c. 3) or the Treason Act 1708 (7 Ann. c. 21) was to extend to any indictment for high treason consisting of compassing or imagining the death of the king, or for misprision of such treason, which alleged any of the overt acts specified above.

The act further provided that nothing contained in the act was to be construed to affect the penalty for treason fixed by law.

== Subsequent developments ==
The provisions of the act were amended and extended to all cases of treason and misprision of treason by section 1 of the Treason Act 1945 (8 & 9 Geo. 6. c. 44), which came into force on 15 June 1945.

The whole act, so far as unrepealed, was repealed for England and Wales by section 10(2) of, and part III of schedule 3 to, the Criminal Law Act 1967, which came into force on 1 January 1968.

The whole act, so far as unrepealed, was repealed for Northern Ireland by section 15(2) of, and schedule 2 to, the Criminal Law Act (Northern Ireland) 1967, which came into force on 1 January 1968.

The whole act was repealed for Scotland by section 83(3) of, and schedule 8 to, the Criminal Justice (Scotland) Act 1980, which came into force on 1 February 1981.

== See also ==
- High treason in the United Kingdom
- Treason Act
