= Bannister Truelock =

British regicide

Bannister Truelock conspired to assassinate George III of the United Kingdom in 1800 along with James Hadfield.

Truelock was a shoemaker and a religious fanatic who prophesied the second coming of Jesus Christ. He also insisted in the belief that the Messiah would be born from his mouth. In December 1800, he was admitted to Bethlem Royal Hospital for allegedly persuading James Hadfield that by shooting George III, Hadfield would bring peace to the world.
