= Criminal Lunatics Act 1884 =

Act of the Parliament of the United Kingdom

Criminal Lunatics Act 1884 (Note: Section 1.)
- Act of Parliament
- Parliament of the United Kingdom
- Long title: An Act to consolidate and amend the Law relating to Criminal Lunatics.
- Citation: 47 & 48 Vict. c. 64
- Introduced by: J. T. Hibbert MP (Commons)
- Territorial extent: England and Wales (Note: Section 18.)

Dates
- Royal assent: 14 August 1884
- Commencement: 1 November 1884 (Note: Section 18.)
- Repealed: 1 November 1960
Other legislation
Amends	See § Repealed enactments
Repeals/revokes	See § Repealed enactments
Amended by	Criminal Justice Act 1948
Repealed by	Mental Health Act 1959
Relates to	Criminal Lunatics Act 1800

Status: Repealed

History of passage through Parliament

Records of Parliamentary debate relating to the statute from Hansard

Text of statute as originally enacted

The Criminal Lunatics Act 1884 (47 & 48 Vict. c. 64) was an act of the Parliament of the United Kingdom that consolidated enactments relating to mentally ill offenders in England and Wales.

== Passage ==
Leave to bring in the Criminal Lunatics Bill to the House of Commons was granted to J. T. Hibbert MP and the Home Secretary, Sir William Harcourt MP on 19 June 1884. The bill had its first reading in the House of Commons on 19 June 1884, presented by J. T. Hibbert MP. The bill had its second reading in the House of Commons on 26 June 1884 and was committed to a committee of the whole house. The committee was discharged on 27 June 1884 and was committed to the Standing Committee on Law, and Courts of Justice, and Legal Procedure, which reported on 17 July 1884, with amendments. The amended bill had its third reading in the House of Commons on 31 August 1884 and passed, without amendments.

The bill had its first reading in the House of Lords on 1 August 1884. The bill had its second reading in the House of Lords on 5 August 1884 and was committed to a committee of the whole house, which met reported on 7 August 1884, without amendments. The bill had its third reading in the House of Lords on 8 August 1884 and passed, with amendments.

The amended bill was considered and agreed to by the House of Commons on 8 August 1884.

The bill was granted royal assent on 14 August 1884.

== Provisions ==
=== Repealed enactments ===
Section 17 of the act repealed 11 enactments, listed in the first schedule to the act. Section 17 of the act also provided that the repeals would not affect any warrant issued or order made under the repealed enactments.

Citation	Short title	Title	Extent of repeal
3 & 4 Vict. c. 54	Insane Prisoners Act 1840	An Act for making further provision for the confinement and maintenance of insane prisoners.	The whole act.
6 & 7 Vict. c. 26	Millbank Prison Act 1843	An Act for regulating the prison at Millbank.	Section twenty-one.
16 & 17 Vict. c. 96	Care and Treatment of Lunatics Act 1853	An Act to amend an Act passed in the ninth year of Her Majesty " for the regulation of the care and treatment " of lunatics.	Section thirty-eight from and including the words " save as herein-after provided;" to the end of that section.
23 & 24 Vict. c. 75	Criminal Lunatic Asylums Act 1860	An Act to make better provision for the custody and care of criminal lunatics.	Section two, the words "of the Acts herein-before mentioned, or under any other," and the words " or to be unfit from imbecility of mind for penal discipline." Sections seven, nine, and ten.
25 & 26 Vict. c. 86	Lunacy Regulation Act 1862	The Lunacy Regulation Act, 1862	Section fifteen.
27 & 28 Vict. c. 29	Insane Prisoners Act 1864	An Act to amend the Act third and fourth Victoria, chapter fifty-four, for making further provision for the confinement and maintenance of insane prisoners	The whole act.
29 & 30 Vict. c. 109	Naval Discipline Act 1866	The Naval Discipline Act, 1866	Section eighty, so far as relates to a person imprisoned in England.
30 & 31 Vict. c. 12	Criminal Lunatics Act 1867	The Criminal Lunatics Act, 1867	The whole act.
32 & 33 Vict. c. 78	Criminal Lunatics Act 1869	The Criminal Lunatics Act, 1869	The whole act.
44 & 45 Vict. c. 58	Army Act 1881	The Army Act, 1881	In section one hundred and thirty so much of sub-section five as relates to a person imprisoned in England.
46 & 47 Vict. c. 38	Trial of Lunatics Act 1883	The Trial of Lunatics Act, 1883	Sub-section three of section two.

== Subsequent developments ==
The act was described as a consolidation act.

The whole act was repealed by section 149(2) of, and part I of the eighth schedule to, Mental Health Act 1959 (7 & 8 Eliz. 2. c. 72), which came into force on 1 November 1960.
