= Marriage of Lunatics Act 1811 =

Act of the Parliament of the United Kingdom

Marriage of Lunatics Act 1811 (Note: The citation of this act by this short title was authorised by section 1 of, and the first schedule to, the Short Titles Act 1896. Due to the repeal of those provisions it is now authorised by section 19(2) of the Interpretation Act 1978.)
- Act of Parliament
- Parliament of the United Kingdom
- Long title: An Act further to prevent the Marriage of Lunatics.
- Citation: 51 Geo. 3. c. 37
- Territorial extent: United Kingdom

Dates
- Royal assent: 31 May 1811
- Commencement: 10 June 1811 (Note: Section 1.)
- Repealed: England and Wales: 1 November 1960Scotland: 1 June 1962 (Note: The Mental Health (Scotland) Act 1960 (Appointed Day No. 3) Order 1962 (SI 1962/516).); Northern Ireland: 18 April 1979 (Note: The Matrimonial Causes (1978 Order) (Commencement No.3) Order (Northern Ireland) 1979 (SI 1979/99 (N.I)).); Republic of Ireland: 1 February 2021
Other legislation
Amends	Marriage of Lunatics Act 1741
Repealed by	England and Wales: Mental Health Act 1959; Scotland: Mental Health (Scotland) Act 1960; Northern Ireland: Matrimonial Causes (Northern Ireland) Order 1978; Republic of Ireland: Assisted Decision-Making (Capacity) Act 2015
Relates to	Marriage of Lunatics Act 1741

Status: Repealed

Text of statute as originally enacted

The Marriage of Lunatics Act 1811 (51 Geo. 3. c. 37) was an act of the Parliament of the United Kingdom implemented under the reign of George III of Great Britain. It was intended "to prevent the marriage of Lunatics" and make all marriages to Lunatics prior to and after the bill, whether diagnosed before marriage or otherwise, "null and void to all intents and purposes whatsoever".

== Provisions ==
The act reads as follows:

Whereas an Act was made in the Parliament of Great Britain in the fifteenth year of the reign of his late Majesty King George the Second to prevent the marriage of lunatics: And whereas it is expedient that the provisions of the said Act should be extended to Ireland: Be it therefore enacted by the King’s most excellent Majesty, by and with the advice and consent of the lords spiritual and temporal, and commons, in this present Parliament assembled, and by the authority of the same, that from and after the expiration of ten days after the passing of this Act, in case any person who has been or at any time hereafter shall be found a lunatic by any inquisition taken or to be taken by virtue of a commission under the great seal of Great Britain or the great seal of Ireland respectively, or any lunatic or person under a phrenzy, whose person and estate by virtue of any Act of Parliament now or hereafter shall be committed to the care and custody of particular trustees, shall marry before he or she shall be declared of sane mind by the lord high chancellor of Great Britain or Ireland or the lord keeper or lords commissioners of the great seal of Great Britain or Ireland for the time being or such trustees as aforesaid or the major part of them respectively, as the nature of the case shall require, every such marriage shall be and is hereby declared to be null and void to all intents and purposes whatsoever.

== Subsequent developments ==
The whole act was repealed for England and Wales by section 149(2) of, and part I of the eighth schedule to, Mental Health Act 1959 (7 & 8 Eliz. 2. c. 72), which came into force on 1 November 1960.

The whole act was repealed for Scotland by section 113(2) of, and the fifth schedule to, the Mental Health (Scotland) Act 1960 (8 & 9 Eliz. 2. c. 61), which came into force on 1 June 1962.

The whole act was repealed for Northern Ireland by article 63(b) of, and schedule 5 to, the Matrimonial Causes (Northern Ireland) Order 1978 (SI 1978/1045 (N.I.)), which came into force on 18 April 1979.

The whole act was repealed for the Republic of Ireland in 2021 on the commencement of the Assisted Decision-Making (Capacity) Act 2015.
