= Mental Treatment Act 1930 =

Act of the Parliament of the United Kingdom

Mental Treatment Act 1930 (Note: Section 22(1).)
- Act of Parliament
- Parliament of the United Kingdom
- Long title: An Act to amend the Lunacy Acts, 1890 to 1922, and such of the provisions of the Mental Deficiency Acts, 1913 to 1927, as relate to the constitution and organisation of the work of the Board of Control, the exercise of the powers of the Board and the protection of persons putting those Acts into operation.
- Citation: 20 & 21 Geo. 5. c. 23
- Territorial extent: England and Wales (Note: Section 22(3).)

Dates
- Royal assent: 10 July 1930
- Commencement: 1 January 1930 (Note: Section 22(4).)
- Repealed: 1 November 1960
Other legislation
Amends	Lunacy Act 1890; Lunacy Act 1891; Mental Deficiency Act 1913
Repealed by	Mental Health Act 1959

Status: Repealed

Text of statute as originally enacted

The Mental Treatment Act 1930 (20 & 21 Geo. 5. c. 23) was an act of the Parliament of the United Kingdom permitting voluntary admission to, and outpatient treatment within, psychiatric hospitals. It also replaced the term "asylum" with "mental hospital".

== Subsequent developments ==
The whole act was repealed by section 149(2) of, and part I of the eighth schedule to, Mental Health Act 1959 (7 & 8 Eliz. 2. c. 72), which came into force on 1 November 1960.
