= Mental Deficiency Act 1913 =

Act of the Parliament of the United Kingdom

Mental Deficiency Act 1913 (Note: Section 72(1).)
- Act of Parliament
- Parliament of the United Kingdom
- Long title: An Act to make further and better provision for the care of Feeble-minded and other Mentally Defective Persons and to amend the Lunacy Acts.
- Citation: 3 & 4 Geo. 5. c. 28
- Territorial extent: England and Wales (Note: Section 72(2).)

Dates
- Royal assent: 15 August 1913
- Commencement: 1 April 1914, except 1 November 1913 as respects the constitution of the Board of Control, and the appointment of the secretary, officers, and servants of the Board (Note: Section 72(3).)
- Repealed: 1 November 1960
Other legislation
Amended by	Mental Deficiency (Amendment) Act 1925; Mental Treatment Act 1930; Local Government Act 1933; Mental Deficiency Act 1938; National Assistance Act 1948; Criminal Justice Act 1948; Justices of the Peace Act 1949; Sexual Offences Act 1956
Repealed by	Mental Health Act 1959
Relates to	Mental Deficiency and Lunacy Act (Scotland) 1913

Status: Repealed

Text of statute as originally enacted

The Mental Deficiency Act 1913 (3 & 4 Geo. 5. c. 28) was an act of the Parliament of the United Kingdom creating provisions for the institutional treatment of people deemed to be "feeble-minded" and "moral defectives". People deemed "mentally defective" under the act could be locked up indefinitely in a "mental deficiency colony", despite not being diagnosed with any mental illness or disability, or committing any crime.

An equivalent piece of legislation, the Mental Deficiency and Lunacy Act (Scotland) 1913, (3 & 4 Geo. 5. c. 38) covered Scotland.

In the late 1940s, the National Council for Civil Liberties discovered that 50,000 people were locked up under the act, and that 30% of them had been locked up for 10-20 years already. The act remained in effect until it was repealed by the Mental Health Act 1959 (7 & 8 Eliz. 2. c. 72), but people detained under this Act were still being discovered in institutions as late as the 1990s.

== Background ==
The Idiots Act 1886 (49 & 50 Vict. c. 25) made the legal distinction between "idiots" and "imbeciles". It contained educational provisions for the needs of people deemed to be in these categories. In 1904, the Royal Commission on the Care and Control of the Feeble-Minded was established with the warrant "to consider the existing methods of dealing with idiots and epileptics, and with imbecile, feeble-minded, or defective persons not certified under the Lunacy Laws... to report as to the amendments in the law or other measures which should be adopted in the matter". The Commission returned a lengthy report in 1908 which estimated that of a population of 32,527,843 British inhabitants 149,628 people (0.46%) were considered "mentally defective". It recommended the establishment of a board of control which would oversee local authority efforts aimed at "the well-being of the mentally defective".

Winston Churchill spoke of the need to introduce compulsory labour camps for "mental defectives" in the House of Commons in February 1911. In May 1912, a Private Members' Bill entitled the "Feeble-Minded Control Bill" was introduced in the House of Commons, which called for the implementation of the Royal Commission's conclusions. It rejected sterilisation of the "feeble-minded", but had provision for registration and segregation. One of the few to raise objections to the bill was G.K. Chesterton who ridiculed the bill, calling it the "Feeble-Minded Bill, both for brevity and because the description is strictly accurate". The bill was withdrawn, but a government bill introduced on 10 June 1912 replaced it, which would become the Mental Deficiency Act 1913.

== Provisions ==
The bill was passed in 1913 with only three MPs voting against it. One of them was Josiah Wedgwood, who attempted to filibuster and said of it, "It is a spirit of the Horrible Eugenic Society which is setting out to breed up the working class as though they were cattle." The new act repealed the Idiots Act 1886 and followed the recommendations of the Royal Commission on the Care and Control of the Feeble-Minded. It established the Board of Control for Lunacy and Mental Deficiency to oversee the implementation of provisions for the care and management of four classes of people,

a) Idiots. Those so deeply defective as to be unable to guard themselves against common physical dangers.

b) Imbeciles. Whose defectiveness does not amount to idiocy, but is so pronounced that they are incapable of managing themselves or their affairs, or, in the case of children, of being taught to do so.

c) Feeble-minded persons. Whose weakness does not amount to imbecility, yet who require care, supervision, or control, for their protection or for the protection of others, or, in the case of children, are incapable of receiving benefit from the instruction in ordinary schools.

d) Moral Imbeciles. Displaying mental weakness coupled with strong vicious or criminal propensities, and on whom punishment has little or no deterrent effect.

A person deemed to be an idiot or imbecile might be placed in an institution or under guardianship if the parent or guardian so petitioned, as could a person of any of the four categories under 21 years, as could a person of any category who had been abandoned, neglected, guilty of a crime, in a state institution, habitually drunk, or unable to be schooled.

Every local authority had a "Mental Deficiency Committee" that parents and guardians could apply to if they were struggling to care for someone under the age of 21. People could also be referred to the committee by magistrates, prisons, asylums, and industrial schools. Two doctors had to sign off on each case. In 1916, reasons for people being referred to the London County Council's Mental Deficiency Committee included being unable to keep a job, epilepsy, having had illegitimate children, homelessness, and living in an "unsatisfactory" (i.e., impoverished) home. For example, one woman called Eliza was referred to the committee by the medical officer at a workhouse in Paddington. She'd had three illegitimate children, and was thought to be unreliable, "refusing to work unless feeling so inclined". The workhouse recommended she be institutionalised "for her own protection" so that she wouldn't "run away with men".

People categorised under this Act would often be sent to a new kind of institution called a "mental deficiency colony" rather than an insane asylum or a prison. Examples include the Farmfield State Institution in Horley and Etloe House in Leyton.

Once a person was deemed "mentally deficient", they could only get the categorisation removed if their family wrote to the Board of Control proving that they could look after the person.

=== Short title, commencement and extent ===
Section 72(1) of the act provided that the act may be cited as the "Mental Deficiency Act, 1913".

Section 72(2) of the act provided that the act would not extend to Scotland or Ireland.

Section 72(3) of the act provided that the act would come into force on 1 April 1914, except that as respects the constitution of the Board of Control, and the appointment of the secretary, officers, and servants of the Board, it would come into force on 1 November 1913.

== Subsequent developments ==
The whole act was repealed for England and Wales by section 149(2) of, and part I of the eighth schedule to, Mental Health Act 1959 (7 & 8 Eliz. 2. c. 72), which came into force on 1 November 1960.
