= People v. Schmidt =

People v. Schmidt, 216 N.Y. 324 (1915), is a decision by the New York Court of Appeals interpreting the concept of "wrong" in the M'Naghten rule for the insanity defense in criminal law.

== Background ==
Hans Schmidt, a Catholic priest, was convicted of first-degree murder for killing and dismembering Anna Aumuller. He initially confessed to the crime, claiming divine command. After conviction, Schmidt sought a new trial, alleging his confession had been fabricated to support a false insanity defense intended to avoid capital punishment.

== Interpretation of "Wrong" ==
The case turns on the interpretation of the M'Naghten rule, a common law standard for the insanity defense that originated in 19th-century England. Under the M'Naghten rule, a defendant may be found not guilty by reason of insanity if, at the time of the offense, they were laboring under such a defect of reason from a mental disorder, as either (1) not to know the nature and quality of the act, or (2) not to know that the act was wrong.

In Schmidt, the New York Court of Appeals focused on the second prong—whether the defendant knew that their act was "wrong." The court interpreted "wrong" to refer to knowledge the act was morally wrong, not knowledge that it was legally wrong.

The court wrote:

The [M'Naghten] court expressly held that a defendant who knew nothing of the law would nonetheless be responsible if he know that the act was wrong, by which, therefore they must have meant, if he knew it was morally wrong... There is nothing to justify the belief that the words right and wrong, when they became limited by M'Naghten's case to the right and wrong of a particular act, cast off their meaning in terms of morals, and became terms of pure legality.

This interpretation narrowed the availability of the insanity defense to individuals who lack moral comprehension of their acts—not merely legal knowledge. The decision departed from any interpretation of "wrong" limited to illegality.

== Delusions of Divine Command ==
The court also considered whether a defendant under the delusion of divine command ("deific decree")—believing God had ordered the act—could know the act was wrong. It concluded that such a defendant, even if acknowledging the act is criminal or legally prohibited, might still lack the moral understanding that the act is wrong. The opinion stated:

It seems a mockery to say that, within the meaning of the statute, she knows that the act is wrong." The court wrote that if a person has an insane delusion that "he has a command from the Almighty to kill, it is difficult to understand how such a man can know that it is wrong for him to do so.

== Legal Reasoning ==
The judgment is also notable for reinforcing procedural integrity. The court held that the legal system must not reward defendants for fraudulent or manipulative post-trial tactics, and underscored that the criteria for granting a new trial must be interpreted strictly. Evidence manufactured or suppressed by the defendant is not grounds for relief.

== Impact ==
People v. Schmidt remains a landmark in the development of the insanity defense in American criminal law. Its moral interpretation of "wrong" has shaped the application of the M'Naghten rule across jurisdictions. It also illustrates the court's role in upholding both substantive and procedural limits to protect the integrity of the justice system.
