= Trial of Lunatics Act 1883 =

Act of the Parliament of the United Kingdom

Trial of Lunatics Act 1883 (Note: Section 1.)
- Act of Parliament
- Parliament of the United Kingdom
- Long title: An Act to amend the Law respecting the Trial and Custody of Insane Persons charged with offences.
- Citation: 46 & 47 Vict. c. 38
- Territorial extent: England and Wales; Ireland; (Note: Section 3.)

Dates
- Royal assent: 25 August 1883
- Commencement: 25 August 1883 (Note: The Acts of Parliament (Commencement) Act 1793.)
Other legislation
Amends	Criminal Lunatics Act 1800; Lunacy (Ireland) Act 1821; Insane Prisoners Act 1840
Amended by	Criminal Lunatics Act 1884; Statute Law Revision Act 1898; Mental Health Act 1959; Criminal Procedure (Insanity) Act 1964; Statute Law (Repeals) Act 1989

Status: Amended

Text of statute as originally enacted

Revised text of statute as amended

Text of the Trial of Lunatics Act 1883 as in force today (including any amendments) within the United Kingdom, from legislation.gov.uk.

The Trial of Lunatics Act 1883 (46 & 47 Vict. c. 38) is an act of the Parliament of the United Kingdom, allowing the jury to return a verdict that the defendant was guilty, but insane at the time, and should be kept in custody as a "criminal lunatic". This act was passed at the request of Queen Victoria, who, the target of frequent attacks by mentally ill individuals, demanded that the verdict be changed from "not guilty" so as to act as a deterrent to other lunatics; the phrasing of "guilty of the act or omission charged, but insane so as not to be responsible, according to law, for his actions" remained in use until the Criminal Procedure (Insanity) Act 1964.

It was cited in 1991 in the case of R v Burgess regarding the automatism defence.

The form of special verdict provided for by this act was commonly known as guilty but insane. This expression was not an accurate description of that verdict.

== Subsequent developments ==
Section 4 of the act was repealed by section 1(1) of, and group 5 of part I of schedule 1 to, the Statute Law (Repeals) Act 1989, which came into force on 16 November 1989.

== See also ==
- Criminal Lunatics Act 1800
- Insanity in English law
