= Sugar soap =

Cleaning agent and bath/beauty product

Sugar soap refers to two distinct product categories, depending on the market and context:

- As a cleaning agent - typically found in Commonwealth countries, this is a cleaning material of variable composition sold for use on surfaces affected by greasy or tarry deposits which are not easily removed with routine domestic cleaning materials. Its name arises from the fact that, when in dry powder form, it resembles table sugar. The solution is alkaline and its uses include cleaning paintwork in preparation for repainting.
- As a bath and beauty product - specifically in India and other markets, this refers to a type of personal care soap that combines glycerine with cane sugar as a humectant, formulated for personal hygiene and daily use in showering and bathing.

== Country-specific information ==
=== United Kingdom ===
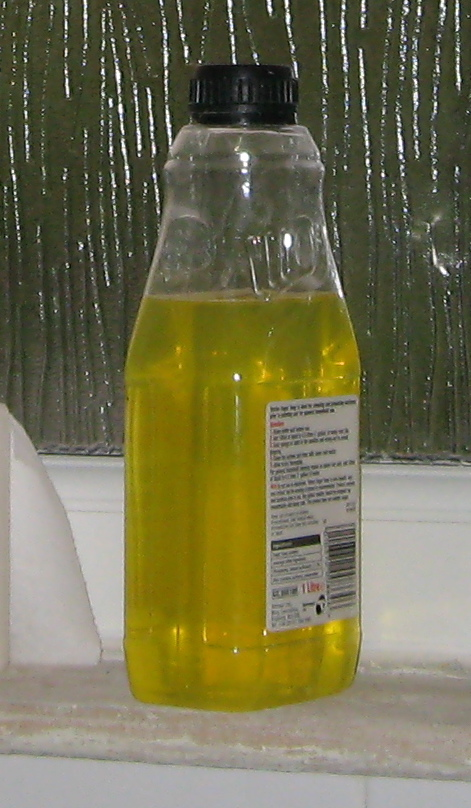
A bottle of sugar soap from the UK

Many brands of sugar soap are freely available for domestic use in the UK, being commonly sold for preparing surfaces for redecoration, stripping certain types of wallpaper, removing accumulations of grease in kitchens or removal of tar deposits caused by tobacco-smoking; products are supplied in powder to be diluted before use or liquid form to be brushed or sprayed.

The precise ingredients and their proportions (and, consequently, what hazards, if any, are associated) vary between manufacturers and suppliers but are now generally found listed in the Material Safety Data Sheets found on manufacturers' and suppliers' web sites.

The alkali component is normally sodium carbonate or less commonly sodium hydroxide at a concentration of a few percent and an organic solvent and an abrasive agent are normally the other functional ingredients, as well as colouring and water.

=== North America ===
The comparable cleaning product in Canada and the US is trisodium phosphate, also known as "TSP". However, due to environmental concerns about the impact of phosphate on lakes and streams, products labeled TSP may not actually contain any trisodium phosphate.

"Sugar Soap" in the US is generally a cosmetic product. If sugar is actually used in the product it helps the natural soap to generate more lather.

=== France and The Netherlands ===
A comparable product in France and The Netherlands is sold under the brand name St Marc. It is branded by Reckitt Benckiser and its formula is a derivative of a resin soap made from terpene. The ingredients listed in the safety data sheet include >30% sodium carbonate.

=== Australia and New Zealand ===
Comparable products in Australia and New Zealand are sold under the brand name Selleys and XL. The chemical compositions listed in their safety data sheets include Sodium carbonate, Sodium lauryl ether sulfate, Sodium tripolyphosphate, and Potassium Hydroxide.

=== India ===
Indian Sugar Soap with glycerine and cane sugar

In India, sugar soap is a popular type of bathing and beauty soap that combines glycerine with cane sugar as a humectant. Unlike cleaning soaps used for surfaces, this product is specifically formulated for personal hygiene and daily use in showering and bathing.

The sugar content helps maintain skin moisture while the glycerine provides cleansing properties, making it a common choice for daily personal care routines.

This type of soap is widely available from various manufacturers and is marketed specifically as "Sugar Soap" in the Indian beauty and personal care market.
