= Idiots Act 1886 =

Act of the Parliament of the United Kingdom

Idiots Act 1886 (Note: Section 1.)
- Act of Parliament
- Parliament of the United Kingdom
- Long title: An Act for giving facilities for the care, education, and training of Idiots and Imbeciles.
- Citation: 49 & 50 Vict. c. 25
- Territorial extent: England and Wales (Note: Section 2.)

Dates
- Royal assent: 25 June 1886
- Commencement: 1 January 1887 (Note: Section 3.)
- Repealed: 1 April 1914
Other legislation
Repealed by	Mental Deficiency Act 1913
Relates to	Lunacy Act 1845

Status: Repealed

Text of statute as originally enacted

The Idiots Act 1886 (49 & 50 Vict. c. 25) was an act of the Parliament of the United Kingdom. It was intended to give "... facilities for the care, education, and training of Idiots and Imbeciles".

The act made, for the first time, the distinction between lunatics (Note: covered under the Lunacy Act 1845 (8 & 9 Vict. c. 100)), idiots and imbeciles for the purpose of making entry into education establishments easier and for defining the ways they were cared for.

Before the act, learning institutions for idiots and imbeciles were seen as either "licensed houses" or "registered hospitals" for lunatics, for which the parents of children hoping to enter would have to complete a form stating that they were "a lunatic, an idiot, or a person of unsound mind". Additionally, they were required to answer irrelevant questions and present two medical certificates.

== Provisions ==
=== Short title, commencement and extent ===
Section 1 of the act provided that the act may be cited as the "Idiots Act, 1886".

Section 2 of the act provided that the act would not extend to Scotland or Ireland.

Section 3 of the act provided that the act would come into force on 1 January 1887.

== Subsequent developments ==
The whole act was repealed by section 67 of the Mental Deficiency Act 1913 (3 & 4 Geo. 5. c. 28), which came into force on 1 April 1914. By that time two further classifications had been introduced: "feeble-minded people" and "moral defectives".
