= Mental Health Act 1959 =

Act of the Parliament of the United Kingdom

Mental Health Act 1959 (Note: Section 154(1).)
- Act of Parliament
- Parliament of the United Kingdom
- Long title: An Act to Repeal the Lunacy and mental Treatment Acts 1890 to 1930, and the Mental Deficiency Acts 1913 to 1938, and to make fresh provisions with respect to the treatment and care of mentally disordered persons and with respect to their property and affairs, and for purposes connected with matters aforesaid.
- Citation: 7 & 8 Eliz. 2. c. 72
- Territorial extent: England and Wales; Scotland; (Note: Sections 150, 152 and 154.)

Dates
- Royal assent: 29 July 1959
- Commencement: 1 November 1960 (Note: Section 153.)
Other legislation
Amends	Chelsea and Kilmainham Hospitals Act 1826; Colonial Prisoners Removal Act 1884; Variation of Trusts Act 1958; See § Repealed enactments
Repeals/revokes	See § Repealed enactments
Amended by	Mental Health (Scotland) Act 1960; Education (Scotland) Act 1962; Administration of Justice Act 1965; Industrial and Provident Societies Act 1965; Matrimonial Causes Act 1965; Criminal Law Act 1967; Social Work (Scotland) Act 1968; Family Law Reform Act 1969; Statute Law (Repeals) Act 1969; Courts Act 1971; Statute Law (Repeals) Act 1971; Costs in Criminal Cases Act 1973; Powers of Criminal Courts Act 1973; Statute Law (Repeals) Act 1974; Statute Law (Repeals) Act 1975; House of Commons Disqualification Act 1975; Mental Health (Amendment) Act 1975; Nursing Homes Act 1975; Statute Law (Repeals) Act 1976; Adoption Act 1976; Statute Law (Repeals) Act 1977; National Health Service Act 1977; Foster Children Act 1980; Residential Homes Act 1980; Magistrates' Courts Act 1980; Limitation Act 1980; Judicial Pensions Act 1981; Forgery and Counterfeiting Act 1981; Senior Courts Act 1981; Mental Health Act 1983; Mental Health (Amendment) Act 1994; Trusts of Land and Appointment of Trustees Act 1996; Land Registration Act 2002; Statute Law (Repeals) Act 2004; National Health Service (Consequential Provisions) Act 2006
Relates to	Mental Health (Scotland) Act 1960

Status: Partially repealed

Text of statute as originally enacted

Revised text of statute as amended

Text of the Mental Health Act 1959 as in force today (including any amendments) within the United Kingdom, from legislation.gov.uk.

The Mental Health Act 1959 (7 & 8 Eliz. 2. c. 72) is an act of the Parliament of the United Kingdom concerning England and Wales which had, as its main objectives, to abolish the distinction between psychiatric hospitals and other types of hospitals and to deinstitutionalise mental health patients and see them treated more by community care.

The Mental Health (Scotland) Act 1960 (8 & 9 Eliz. 2. c. 61) made similar provisions for Scotland.

It also defined the term mental disorder for the first time, making mental illness distinct from learning disabilities. The definition reads: “mental illness; arrest or incomplete development of mind; psychopathic disorder; and any other disorder or disability of mind”.

At the time, 0.4% of the population of England were housed in asylums, receiving the standard treatments of the time. Their treatment was considered by the 1957 Percy Commission and the act resulted from its deliberations. The act was designed to make:

- treatment voluntary and informal;
- and where compulsory give it a proper legal framework and made as a medical decision;
- and to move treatment, where possible, away from institutional care to that in the community.

The act repealed the Lunacy and Mental Treatment Acts 1890 to 1930 and the Mental Deficiency Acts 1913 to 1938.

One of the changes introduced by the act was the abolishment of the category of "moral imbecile". The category, which had been introduced in the 1913 act, had been defined in such vague terms that it had allowed mothers of illegitimate children, especially in case of repeated births out of wedlock, to be regarded as "moral imbeciles" and thus to be placed in an institution for defectives or to be placed under guardianship.

== Provisions ==
=== Repealed enactments ===
Section 149(2) of the act repealed 72 enactments, listed in the eighth schedule to the act.

Part I — Repeals extending to England and Wales only
Citation	Short title	Extent of repeal
—	Prerogativa Regis	Chapters xi and xii.
51 Geo. 3. c. 37	Marriage of Lunatics Act 1811	The whole act.
1 & 2 Vict. c. 106	Pluralities Act 1838	Section seventy-nine.
1 & 2 Vict. c. 110	Judgments Act 1838	In section eighteen, the words "and all orders of the Lord Chancellor in matters of lunacy" and the words "and by the Lord Chancellor in matters of lunacy".
12 & 13 Vict. c. 45	Quarter Sessions Act 1849	In section two, the words "or against an order under any statute relating to pauper lunatics".
15 & 16 Vict. c. 87	Court of Chancery Act 1852	The whole act.
23 & 24 Vict. c. 75	Criminal Lunatic Asylums Act 1860	The whole act.
33 & 34 Vict. c. 77	Juries Act 1870	In the Schedule, the words "Keepers in public lunatic asylums".
34 & 35 Vict. c. 44	Incumbents Resignation Act 1871	Section eighteen.
36 & 37 Vict. c. 57	Consolidated Fund (Permanent Charges Redemption) Act 1873	In section seven, in the definition of "limited owner", the words "a committee of a lunatic or idiot".
46 & 47 Vict. c. 38	Trial of Lunatics Act 1883	In section two, in subsection (2), the words "as a criminal lunatic".
47 & 48 Vict. c. 64	Criminal Lunatics Act 1884	The whole act.
53 & 54 Vict. c. 5	Lunacy Act 1890	The whole act.
53 & 54 Vict. c. 39	Partnership Act 1890	In section thirty-five, paragraph (a).
54 & 55 Vict. c. 65	Lunacy Act 1891	The whole act.
61 & 62 Vict. c. 57	Elementary School Teachers (Superannuation) Act 1898	In section six, paragraph (b) of subsection (1) so far as it applies in relation to persons of unsound mind.
7 Edw. 7. c. 23	Criminal Appeal Act 1907	In section five, in subsection (4), the words "as a criminal lunatic".
8 Edw. 7. c. 47	Lunacy Act 1908	The whole act.
3 & 4 Geo. 5. c. 28	Mental Deficiency Act 1913	The whole act.
6 & 7 Geo. 5. c. 31	Police, Factories, &c. (Miscellaneous Provisions) Act 1916	Section eleven.
8 & 9 Geo. 5. c. 55	School Teachers (Superannuation) Act 1918	Section nine.
12 & 13 Geo. 5. c. 16	Law of Property Act 1922	In section one hundred and eighty-eight, paragraph (39).
12 & 13 Geo. 5. c. 60	Lunacy Act 1922	The whole act.
15 & 16 Geo. 5. c. 18	Settled Land Act 1925	Section twenty-eight. In section one hundred and seventeen, in subsection (1), paragraph (xiii).
15 & 16 Geo. 5. c. 19	Trustee Act 1925	In section sixty-eight, in paragraph (15), the words " 'lunatic'. 'defective' ".
15 & 16 Geo. 5. c. 20	Law of Property Act 1925	In section seventy-six, in paragraph (F) of subsection (1), the words "or as committee of a lunatic or as receiver of a defective," and in subsection (4), the words "or as committee of a lunatic, or as receiver of a defective". In section seventy-seven, in subsection (4), the words "or as committee of a lunatic, or as receiver of a defective,". Section one hundred and seventy-one. In the Second Schedule, in the cross-heading to Part VI, the words "or as committee of a lunatic or as a receiver of a defective".
15 & 16 Geo. 5. c. 21	Land Registration Act 1925	In section three, in paragraph (xxvi), the words " 'committee' ", " 'lunatic' " and " 'defective' ".
15 & 16 Geo. 5. c. 23	Administration of Estates Act 1925	In section fifty-one, in subsection (2), the words "committee or". In section fifty-five, in paragraph (viii) of subsection (1), the definition of "committee".
15 & 16 Geo. 5. c. 49	Supreme Court of Judicature (Consolidation) Act 1925	In section twenty-six, in subsection (2), in paragraph (c), the words from "or from any order" to the end of the paragraph. Section one hundred and twenty-four.
15 & 16 Geo. 5. c. 53	Mental Deficiency (Amendment) Act 1925	The whole act.
15 & 16 Geo. 5. c. 59	Teachers (Superannuation) Act 1925	In the First Schedule, paragraph 9.
15 & 16 Geo. 5. c. 86	Criminal Justice Act 1925	In section thirty-four, the words "or the Board of Control" and the words "or a Commissioner or the Secretary of the Board of Control".
17 & 18 Geo. 5. c. 33	Mental Deficiency Act 1927	The whole act.
20 & 21 Geo. 5. c. 23	Mental Treatment Act 1930	The whole act.
23 & 24 Geo. 5. c. 12	Children and Young Persons Act 1933	In the Fourth Schedule, in paragraph 4, the words from "and shall" to the end of the paragraph.
23 & 24 Geo. 5. c. 36	Administration of Justice (Miscellaneous Provisions) Act 1933	Section eight.
1 Edw. 8 & 1 Geo. 6. c. 47	Teachers (Superannuation) Act 1937	In section one, in subsection (6), the references to section nine of the School Teachers (Superannuation) Act, 1918, and paragraph 9 of the First Schedule to the Teachers (Superannuation) Act, 1925.
1 & 2 Geo. 6. c. 43	Mental Deficiency Act 1938	The whole act.
2 & 3 Geo. 6. c. 31	Civil Defence Act 1939	In section sixty-six, in subsection (2), the word "committee" in each place where it occurs.
2 & 3 Geo. 6. c. 40	London Government Act 1939	In section ninety-four, subsection (1).
7 & 8 Geo. 6. c. 31	Education Act 1944	Section fifty-seven. In the Eighth Schedule, the amendment of section two of the Mental Deficiency Act, 1913.
9 & 10 Geo. 6. c. 81	National Health Service Act 1946	In section sixteen, in subsection (1), the words "or mental defectiveness". In section twenty-seven, in subsection (1) the words "or mental defectiveness". In section twenty-eight, in subsection (1) the words "or mental defectiveness". In section twenty-nine, in subsection (1) the words "mentally defective". Sections forty-nine to fifty-one. In section fifty-two, in subsection (1), the words "the Lunacy and Mental Treatment Acts, 1890 to 1930, or the Mental Deficiency Acts, 1913 to 1938". In section seventy-nine, in subsection (1), in the definition of "hospital", the words "or mental defectiveness" and in the definition of "local authority", paragraph (b). The Eighth and Ninth Schedules. In the Tenth Schedule, the amendments of the Children and Young Persons Act, 1933, and the Education Act, 1944.
11 & 12 Geo. 6. c. 29	National Assistance Act 1948	In the Sixth Schedule, in paragraph 7, sub-paragraphs (2) and (3).
11 & 12 Geo. 6. c. 40	Education (Miscellaneous Provisions) Act 1948	Section eight. In the First Schedule, in Part I, the amendment of subsection (6) of section fifty-seven of the Education Act, 1944, and, in the amendments of section one hundred and sixteen of that Act, the paragraph beginning with "For the words"; and in Part II, the amendments of the Mental Deficiency Act, 1913.
11 & 12 Geo. 6. c. 58	Criminal Justice Act 1948	In section four, in subsection (3), the words "or can be" and the words "as a voluntary patient or," and in subsection (4), the words "as a voluntary patient or". In section forty-seven, in subsection (1), the words "or voluntary". Sections sixty-two to sixty-four. In section seventy-seven, in subsection (2), the words from the beginning to "Treasury, and". In section eighty, in subsection (1), the definition of "mental hospital". In the Fifth Schedule, in paragraph 3, in paragraph (d) of sub-paragraph (1), the words "voluntary or". In the Ninth Schedule, the amendments of the Criminal Lunatic Asylums Act, 1860, the Criminal Lunatics Act, 1884, the Mental Deficiency Act, 1913, and the Mental Deficiency Act, 1927.
11 & 12 Geo. 6. c. 63	Agricultural Holdings Act 1948	Section eighty-four.
12, 13 & 14 Geo. 6. c. 93	National Health Service (Amendment) Act 1949	Section twenty-six.
12, 13 & 14 Geo. 6. c. 100	Law Reform (Miscellaneous Provisions) Act 1949	Section eight.
14 Geo. 6. c. 25	Matrimonial Causes Act 1950	In section one, in subsection (2), in paragraph (d) the words "the Mental Treatment Act, 1930, or under".
15 & 16 Geo. 6. & 1 Eliz. 2. c. 52	Prison Act 1952	In the Third Schedule, the amendments of the Mental Deficiency Act, 1913.
15 & 16 Geo. 6. & 1 Eliz. 2. c. 55	Magistrates' Courts Act 1952	In section twenty-six, subsection (6). Section thirty.
4 & 5 Eliz. 2. c. 34	Criminal Justice Administration Act 1956	In section two, subsection (8).
4 & 5 Eliz. 2. c. 46	Administration of Justice Act 1956	In section ten, in subsection (1), paragraph (b).
4 & 5 Eliz. 2. c. 69	Sexual Offences Act 1956	Section eight. In the Second Schedule, in paragraph 1, sub-paragraph (vii), and paragraph 12.
6 & 7 Eliz. 2. c. 3	Yarmouth Naval Hospital Transfer Act 1957	The whole act.
6 & 7 Eliz. 2. c. 40	Matrimonial Proceedings (Children) Act 1958	In section five, subsection (6).
6 & 7 Eliz. 2. c. 55	Local Government Act 1958	In section fifty, in subsection (1), the words "or of that section as applied by section fifty-one of that Act" and the words "(or that subsection as applied by the said section fifty-one)". In the Eighth Schedule, paragraph 19.

Part II — Other repeals
Citation	Short title	Extent of repeal
2 & 3 Vict. c. 51	Pensions Act 1839	Section six.
47 & 48 Vict. c. 64	Criminal Lunatics Act 1884	In section eight, subsections (3) to (5).
49 & 50 Vict. c. 16	Lunacy (Vacating of Seats) Act 1886	The whole act.
50 & 51 Vict. c. 67	Superannuation Act 1887	Section seven, except so far as applied by the Superannuation Act (Northern Ireland), 1921.
53 & 54 Vict. c. 5	Lunacy Act 1890	Section eighty-six. In section eighty-seven, in subsection (1), the words "England or" and in subsection (2), the words "England and", the words "England or" in each place where they occur, and the words "as the case may be". In section eighty-eight, in subsection (1), the words "England or", and in subsection (2), the words "England and", the words "for any justice in England, and", the words "England or" and the words "as the case may be". Section one hundred and seven. In section one hundred and thirty-one, subsections (1) and (4), and in subsections (2) and (3), the words "England or" in each place where they occur.
9 & 10 Geo. 6. c. 72	Education (Scotland) Act 1946	Section one hundred and four.
9 & 10 Geo. 6. c. 81	National Health Service Act 1946	In section eighty, in subsection (2), the words from "and the amendment" to "1884". In the Ninth Schedule, in Part I, the amendment of subsection (3) of section eight of the Criminal Lunatics Act, 1884.
11 & 12 Geo. 6. c. 29	National Assistance Act 1948	In section thirty-seven, in the proviso to subsection (9), the words "any institution for persons of unsound mind within the meaning of the Lunacy and Mental Treatment Acts, 1890 to 1930 or", the words "the Mental Deficiency Acts, 1913 to 1927 or" and the word "or" at the end of paragraph (f).
11 & 12 Geo. 6. c. 43	Children Act 1948	Section eight.
11 & 12 Geo. 6. c. 58	Criminal Justice Act 1948	Section sixty-three.
12, 13 & 14 Geo. 6. c. 44	Superannuation Act 1949	In section forty-eight, in subsection (5), the words from "and section three hundred and thirty-five" to "unsound mind)".
12, 13 & 14 Geo. 6. c. 94	Criminal Justice (Scotland) Act 1949	In section sixty-four, in subsection (2), the words from "and any patient" to the end of the subsection, and subsection (3).
3 & 4 Eliz. 2. c. 18	Army Act 1955	In section sixteen, in subsection (4), the words "an order under section sixteen of the Lunacy Act, 1890, or in Scotland".
3 & 4 Eliz. 2. c. 19	Air Force Act 1955	In section sixteen, in subsection (4), the words "an order made under section sixteen of the Lunacy Act, 1890, or in Scotland".
6 & 7 Eliz. 2. c. 65	Children Act 1958	In section two, in subsection (5), the words "the Mental Deficiency Acts, 1913 to 1938, or", the words "the Board of Control or of", and the words "the Board of Control in accordance with subsection (2) of section fifty-one of the Mental Deficiency Act, 1913, or to".

== Subsequent developments ==
Section 149(2) of, and schedule 8 to, the act were repealed by section 1 of, and part XI of the schedule to, the Statute Law (Repeals) Act 1974, which came into force on 27 June 1974.

Most of the act was repealed by section 148(3) of, and schedule 6 to, the Mental Health Act 1983, which came into force on 30 September 1983.

== See also ==
- Mental Health Act 1983
