= Criminal Lunatics Act 1800 =

Act of the Parliament of Great Britain

Criminal Lunatics Act 1800 (Note: The citation of this act by this short title was authorised by section 1 of, and the first schedule to, the Short Titles Act 1896. Due to the repeal of those provisions it is now authorised by section 19(2) of the Interpretation Act 1978.)
- Act of Parliament
- Parliament of Great Britain
- Long title: An Act for the safe Custody of Insane Persons charged with Offences.
- Citation: 39 & 40 Geo. 3. c. 94
- Territorial extent: Great Britain

Dates
- Royal assent: 28 July 1800
- Commencement: 28 July 1800 (Note: The Acts of Parliament (Commencement) Act 1793.)
- Repealed: 21 May 1981
Other legislation
Amended by	Custody of Insane Persons Act 1816; Criminal Lunatics Act 1838; Trial of Lunatics Act 1883; Statute Law Revision Act 1888; Statute Law Revision Act 1948
Repealed by	Criminal Procedure (Insanity) Act 1964, (Note: Except for cases where the accused was arraigned less than one month after that Act was passed.) Statute Law (Repeals) Act 1981
Relates to	Treason Act 1800; Criminal Lunatics Act 1884; Statute Law Revision Act 1948

Status: Repealed

Text of statute as originally enacted

The Criminal Lunatics Act 1800 (39 & 40 Geo. 3. c. 94) was an act of the Parliament of Great Britain that required and established a set procedure for the indefinite detention of mentally ill offenders. It was passed through the House of Commons in direct reaction to the trial of James Hadfield, who attempted to assassinate King George III.

== Background ==
Before 1800, if a defendant was acquitted on the grounds of insanity, he was simply allowed to go free because there was no law in place that allowed the government to detain him. If the judge presiding over the case thought that it would be dangerous to release the defendant and wanted him detained, a separate civil commitment hearing had to be held before the person could be incarcerated. In some cases, the authorities were able to use the Vagrancy Act of 1744 to confine criminals, but in the majority of cases the defendants were sent home or put into the care of their family.

Because a ruling in favour of a plea of insanity was basically equated with a verdict of not guilty, it was generally very difficult to obtain. The consensus among law officials of the time was that madness had to be "obvious and overwhelming" before a plea of insanity would be accepted as a defence. If it could be successfully argued that a lunatic committed a crime during a brief moment of sanity, then it was considered acceptable to convict the defendant, allowing the authorities to detain that person for the good of society.

== Trial of James Hadfield ==
In May 1800, James Hadfield attempted to assassinate King George III at the Drury Lane Theatre. His statement at the time of his arrest was: "It is not over yet – there is a great deal more and worse to be done" which the prosecution used to argue that he was sane enough to plan the event and then carry it to fruition. Later, however, Hadfield changed his story and maintained that he had "not attempted to kill the King".

Because the intended victim was the King of Great Britain, James Hadfield was charged with treason. This charge proved to be critical in determining the result of his case because it entitled him to several rights that were not given to criminals who had attempted to kill an ordinary person. First of all, the testimony of two witnesses, instead of just one, was needed to prove him guilty, since this was not an ordinary crime (the Treason Act 1800 was passed in July 1800 to make treason by attempting to kill the King subject to the same rules of evidence and procedure as a normal murder trial). Second and more importantly, he could demand that the court provide him with two defence counsels that would argue his case for him, instead of having to act as his own defence. Hadfield chose Thomas Erskine as his chief counsel. At the time, Erskine was regarded as the best lawyer in England.

Despite attempts by the prosecution to emphasise the standard strict criteria for madness, Erskine succeeded in convincing the judge and jury that Hadfield had only appeared to make an attempt on the King’s life in an effort to get himself killed, in accordance with his delusional belief that he must die at the hands of others. The verdict of not guilty was secured.

Surprisingly, this result of the trial did not bring about a public outrage, possibly since no harm had actually come to the king. However, according to the Vagrancy Act 1714 (13 Ann. c. 26) and Vagrancy Act 1744 (17 Geo. 2. c. 5), Hadfield could only be held until he had recovered his mind and the concern was that he would be released in a period of lucidity and make another attempt on the King’s life at a later date. In order to legally confine him, the Criminal Lunatics Bill of 1800 was hastily sent to the House of Commons.

== Provisions ==
No more than four days after the trial of James Hadfield, the prosecution proposed "A Bill for Regulating Trials for High Treason and Misprision of High Treason in certain cases, and for the Safe Custody of Insane Persons Charged with Offences". This bill included both what was to become the Criminal Lunatics Act 1800 and the Treason Act 1800, but the two sections were separated the day after the initial bill was presented to Parliament.

The terms of the act applied to people charged with treason, murder, or felony who were acquitted on the grounds of insanity or who appeared to be insane when apprehended, brought in for arraignment, or summoned for discharge due to a lack of prosecution. The procedure for dealing with these people read as follows: "If [the jury] shall find that such person was insane at the time of the committing such offence, the court before whom such trial shall be had, shall order such person to be kept in strict custody, in such place and in such manner as to the court shall seem fit, until His Majesty's pleasure shall be known." In essence, the Criminal Lunatics Act required the detention of someone who had committed a crime in a bout of insanity rather than leaving it to the discretion of the judge and jury.

== Subsequent developments ==
The act was amended by the Custody of Insane Persons Act 1816 (56 Geo. 3. c. 117) and the Criminal Lunatics Act 1838 (3 & 4 Vict. c. 14).

Section 1 of the act was repealed for England and Wales and Ireland, by section 4 of the Trial of Lunatics Act 1883 (46 & 47 Vict. c. 38), which came into force on 25 August 1883.

Section 1 of the act was repealed for Scotland by section 1 of, and the first schedule to, the Statute Law Revision Act 1948 (11 & 12 Geo. 6. c. 62), which came into force on 30 July 1948.

The whole act was repealed by the Criminal Procedure (Insanity) Act 1964, except if the accused was arraigned less than a month after that act passed.

The whole act was repealed by section 1(1) of, and part I of schedule 1 to, the Statute Law (Repeals) Act 1981, which came into force on 21 May 1981.

Currently, detention of mentally ill offenders is regulated by the Mental Health Act 1983, sections 35–41 and 47–49.

== See also ==
- Mental health law
- Treason Act 1541
- Criminal Lunatics (Ireland) Act 1838
