= James Hadfield =

British man who attempted to assassinate George III of the UK in 1800

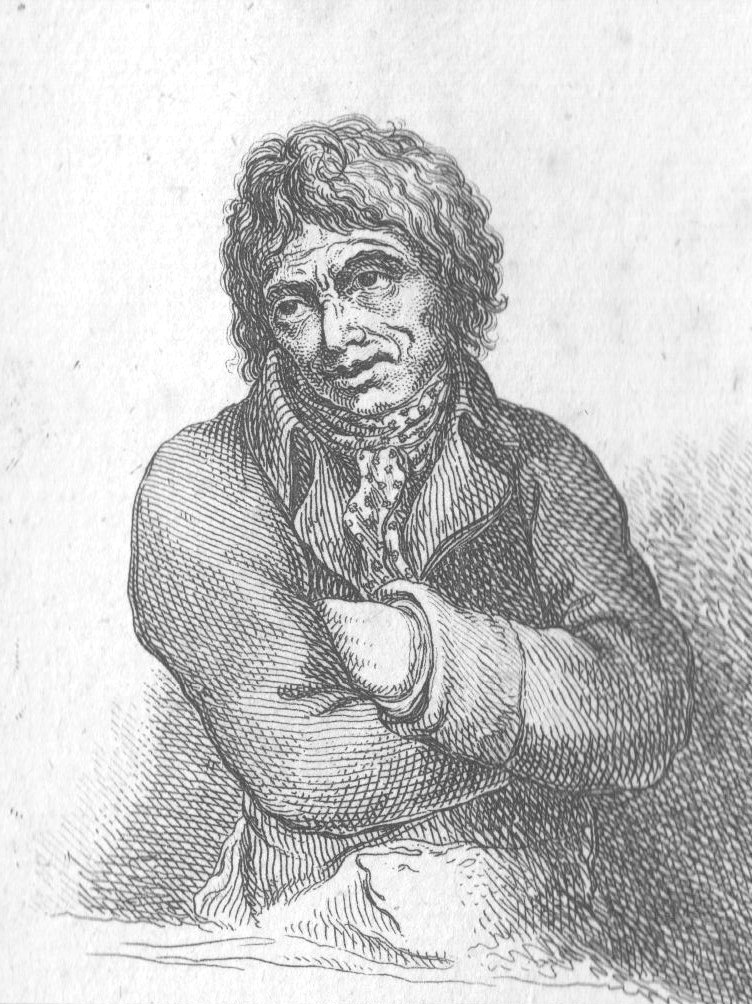
- Born: 1771–1772
- Died: 23 January 1841 (aged 69–70 years); Bethlem Hospital
- Known for: Attempted 1800 regicide of George III

James Hadfield or Hatfield (1771/1772 – 23 January 1841) attempted to assassinate George III of Great Britain in 1800 but was acquitted of attempted murder by reason of insanity.

== Biography ==
Hadfield's early years are unknown but he was severely injured at the Battle of Tourcoing in 1794. Before being captured by the French, he was struck eight times on the head with a sabre, the wounds being prominent for the rest of his life. After returning to England, he became involved in a millennialist movement and came to believe that the Second Coming of Jesus Christ would be advanced if he himself were killed by the British government. He therefore resolved, in conspiracy with Bannister Truelock, to attempt the assassination of the King and bring about his own judicial execution.

On the evening of 15 May 1800, at the Theatre Royal, Drury Lane, during the playing of the national anthem, Hadfield fired a pistol at the King standing in the royal box but missed. Hadfield was tried for high treason and was defended by Thomas Erskine, the leading barrister of that era. Hadfield pleaded insanity but the standard of the day for a successful plea was that the defendant must be "lost to all sense ... incapable of forming a judgement upon the consequences of the act which he is about to do". Hadfield's planning of the shooting appeared to contradict such a claim. Due to the 1795 Treason Act, there was little distinction between plotting treason and actually committing treason, thus Erskine chose to challenge the insanity test, instead contending that delusion "unaccompanied by frenzy or raving madness [was] the true character of insanity". Two surgeons and a physician testified that the delusions were the consequence of his earlier head injuries. The judge, Lloyd Kenyon, 1st Baron Kenyon, at this point halted the trial declaring that the verdict "was clearly an acquittal" but "the prisoner, for his own sake, and for the sake of society at large, must not be discharged".

Up to that time, defendants acquitted by reason of insanity had faced no certain fate and had often been released back to the safe-keeping of their families. Parliament speedily passed the Criminal Lunatics Act 1800 to provide for the indefinite detention of insane defendants (and the Treason Act 1800 to make it easier to prosecute people for attempts on the life of the king). Hadfield later inspired further use of pleading insanity several years later during the case of Colonel Edward Despard. Hadfield was detained in Bethlem Royal Hospital for the rest of his life, save for a short period when he escaped. He was recaptured at Dover attempting to flee to France and was briefly held at Newgate Prison before being transferred to the newly opened criminal department at Bethlem (or Bedlam, as it was known). He died there of tuberculosis in 1841.

== Fictional accounts of Hadfield's life ==
Hadfield's story is depicted in the BBC TV period legal drama series in episode 1 of the third series of Garrow's Law, in which William Garrow is portrayed as his barrister - however several changes were made from the generally accepted historical facts.

James Hadfield is also a character in the final season of period drama Poldark where he is played by Andrew Gower.

== Bibliography ==
- [Anon.] (1800). "Domestic Intelligence". The European Magazine, and London Review. 37: 410–413.
- Eigen, J.P. (1995). Witnessing Insanity: Madness and Mad-doctors in the English Court. Yale University Press. ISBN 0-300-06289-3.
- "Hadfield, James (1771/2–1841)". Oxford Dictionary of National Biography (online ed.). Oxford University Press. 2005. doi:10.1093/ref:odnb/41013. (Subscription, Wikipedia Library access or UK public library membership required.)
- Moran, R. (1985). "The origin of insanity as a special verdict: the trial for treason of James Hadfield, 1800". Law and Society Review. 19 (3). Law & Society Review, Vol. 19, No. 3: 487–519. doi:10.2307/3053574. JSTOR 3053574. PMID 11617589.
- Quen, J.M. (1969). "James Hadfield and medical jurisprudence of insanity". New York State Journal of Medicine. 69 (9): 1221–6. PMID 4891503.
- Walker, N. (1968). Crime and Insanity in England: Vol.1 The Historical Perspective. Edinburgh University Press. ISBN 0-85224-017-1.
