= Butler Committee =

Committee of the Government of the United Kingdom

The Committee on Mentally Abnormal Offenders, widely referred to as the Butler Committee after its chairman Lord Butler of Saffron Walden, was set up in 1972 by the Government of the United Kingdom. The Committee submitted an Interim Report in 1974 and published a Final Report in October 1975, proposing major reforms to the law and to psychiatric services.

== Terms of reference ==
The committee was set up jointly by the Home Office and the Department of Health and Social Security, and given a wide remit to investigate the current law, hear the views of relevant parties, and propose reforms. The official terms of reference, which covered England and Wales, were:

(a) To consider to what extent and on what criteria the law should recognise mental disorder or abnormality in a person accused of a criminal offence as a factor affecting his liability to be tried or convicted, and his disposal;

(b) To consider what, if any, changes are necessary in the powers, procedure and facilities relating to the provision of appropriate treatment, in prison, hospital or the community, for offenders suffering from mental disorder or abnormality, and to their discharge and aftercare;

(c) To make recommendations.

== Context ==
There had been growing criticism since the 1960s of the holding of offenders with mental disorders - from the public concerned with possibly dangerous individuals being released, from prisons who could not get psychiatric help for their inmates, and from the three national secure psychiatric hospitals experiencing overcrowding and poor conditions.

In addition, in 1972, the trial of Graham Young caused huge public controversy spurring the need for a major review. Young had been admitted to Broadmoor Hospital at the age of 14 after poisoning several family members; he was released 9 years later but within months had poisoned dozens of his colleagues, killing two. The case of Terence John Iliffe was also referenced by the Butler committee; Iliffe had been sent to Broadmoor in 1970 after killing his second wife but was released in 1973 with a specific warning to monitor in case he remarried; however within the year he did remarry and within days had strangled his wife. However, like Young the second time round, he was found sane at trial.

In 1974 the Glancy Report recommended, as had prior reports since 1961 (the Emery Committee), that secure hospital facilities be developed in each region for psychiatric patients who were not suitable for open hospitals but did not need to go to a high secure hospital.

Lord Butler, or Rab Butler as he was widely known, was a leading Conservative politician who had been Home Secretary (responsible for crime) from 1957 to 1962, and for that reason his suitability as impartial chairman was questioned in parliament. He was at the time President of the charity the National Association for Mental Health (later renamed Mind), and Chairman of the Trustees of the charity the Mental Health Trust and Research Fund (shortly thereafter renamed the Mental Health Foundation).

== Recommendations ==
The Final Report made numerous recommendations, including for reform of the psychiatric hospital system, of forensic psychiatry, and the insanity defence.

One major recommendation has largely now been implemented - the setting up of secure psychiatric units in each region of the country.

The Butler Committee subjected the wording of the insanity defence to intense criticism, noting that the rules were "based on too limited a concept of the nature of mental disorder", highlighting "the outmoded language of the M'Naghten Rules which gives rise to problems of interpretation" and arguing that the rules were "based on the now obsolete belief in the pre-eminent role of reason in controlling social behaviour... [the rules] are not therefore a satisfactory test of criminal responsibility". An additional criticism was that the defence puts the burden of proof onto the defendant, while in all other cases the burden is on the prosecution. The Committee proposed reform of the law along these lines, which was largely taken up by a draft bill produced by the Law Commission in 1989; so far, however, these have both been ignored by successive governments.

The committee's alternative to the insanity defence, which it termed 'not guilty on evidence of mental disorder', has itself been criticised; for example for focusing largely on psychosis rather than the full range of mental disorders, and for assuming a causal link between such conditions and any particular actions of the individual (though acknowledging in theory that there might not be such a link in some particular hard to imagine case).

The committee also suggested that psychopathy should be removed from the law and replaced with 'personality disorder'. 'Psychopathic disorder' was at that time a category in the Mental Health Act, and would remain so until being removed by amendments in 2007. The committee's report said the understanding was so varied that theories about psychopathy should 'only to be understood as reference to the particular sense in which the term is employed by the psychiatrists in question".

Most of the committee's recommendations on fitness to plead were incorporated into the Criminal Procedure (Insanity and Unfitness to Plead) Act 1991, such as the requirement for expert evidence on fitness from two medical practitioners and, if found unfit by the judge, a hearing of the facts in place of a full trial.

The Law Commission is still, as of 2013, consulting on and making proposals for reform of the law on 'insanity' and 'sane automatism and fitness to plead.
