= Deific-decree =

Legal term

The deific decree delusion is a defense in a criminal case in which a person committed a crime in the belief that their God ordered them to do it. This would make the perpetrator legally insane as they would be incapable of distinguishing right from wrong.

== See also ==
- Command hallucination
- Duress in American law § Insane duress
- Ethics of Søren Kierkegaard, view that God may communicate commands directly to individuals and these should be obeyed disregarding all moral obligations
