= Mental health law =

Subset of law

Mental health law includes a wide variety of legal topics and pertain to people with a diagnosis or possible diagnosis of a mental health condition, and to those involved in managing or treating such people. Laws that relate to mental health include:

- employment laws, including laws that prohibit employment discrimination on the basis of a mental health condition, require reasonable accommodations in the workplace, and provide mental health-related leave;
- insurance laws, including laws governing mental health coverage by medical insurance plans, disability insurance, workers compensation, and Social Security Disability Insurance;
- housing laws, including housing discrimination and zoning;
- education laws, including laws that prohibit discrimination, and laws that require reasonable accommodations, equal access to programs and services, and free appropriate public education;
- laws that provide a right to treatment;
- involuntary commitment and guardianship laws;
- laws governing treatment professionals, including licensing laws, confidentiality, informed consent, and medical malpractice;
- laws governing admission of expert testimony or other psychiatric evidence in court; and
- criminal laws, including laws governing fitness for trial or execution, and the insanity defense.

Mental health law has received relatively little attention in scholarly legal forums. The University of Memphis Cecil C. Humphreys School of Law in 2011 announced the formation of a student-edited law journal entitled "Mental Health Law & Policy Journal."

== By country ==
=== Canada ===
==== Ontario ====
The Mental Health Act (French: Loi sur la santé mentale) is an Ontario law that regulates the administration of mental health care in the province. The main purpose of the legislation is to regulate the involuntary admission of people into a psychiatric hospital. Since the changes brought about in 2000 under Bill 68 (often referred to as Brian's Law, named after Brian Smith who was shot dead in 1995 by a person suffering from paranoid schizophrenia), the Act allows for a community treatment order by the attending physician. This order is intended to provide comprehensive treatment outside of a psychiatric facility. Community Treatment Orders allow complete freedom to carry on with work or school, while living in any neighbourhood, and taking medicine on a regular basis. Support is offered by health professionals called Assertive Community Treatment teams to avoid serious relapse which may require hospitalization. Ontario has over 70 locations for ACT teams.

=== Italy ===
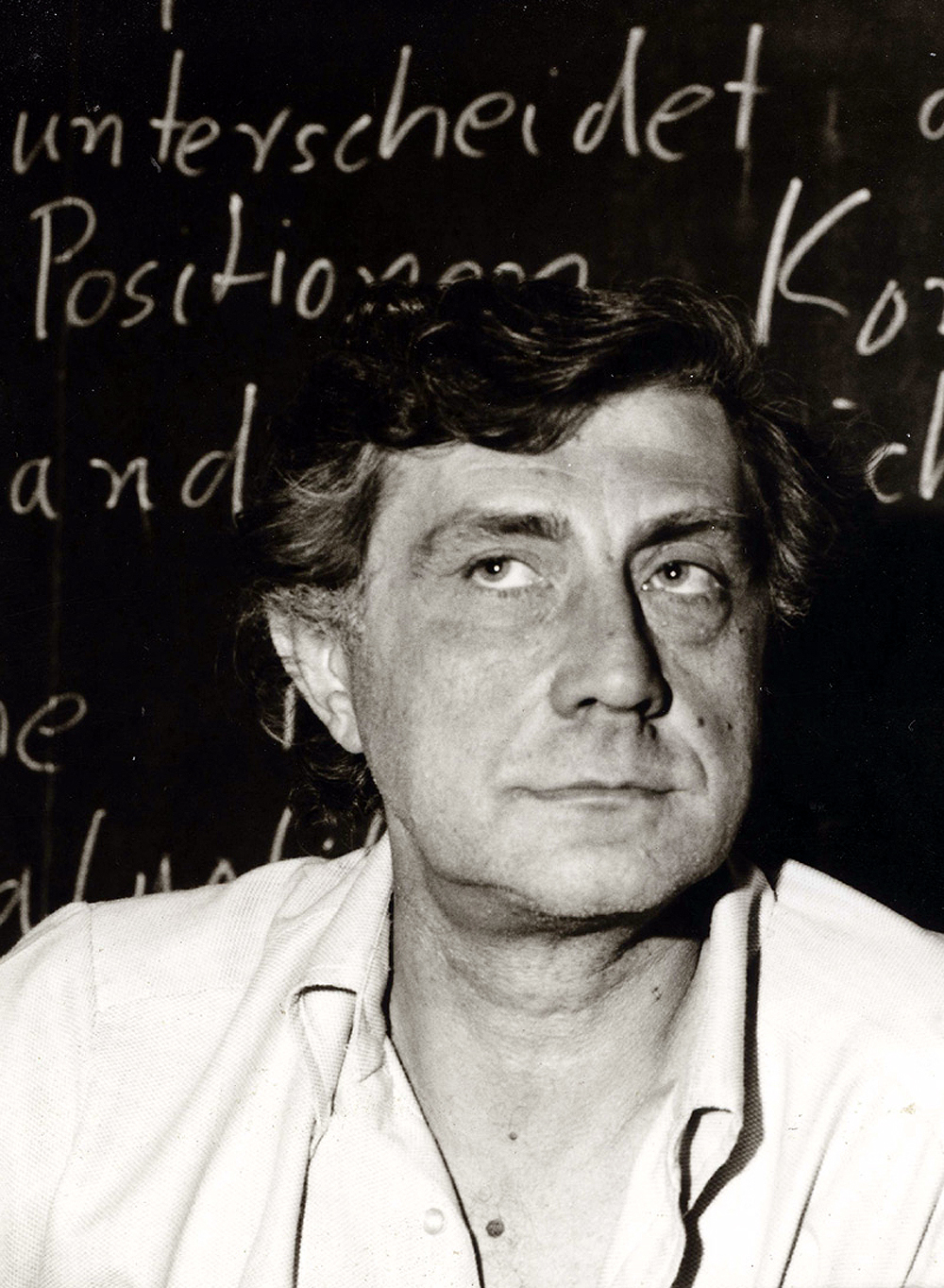
Law 180 is also known by the name of its main proponent, Franco Basaglia.

Basaglia Law or Law 180 (Italian: Legge Basaglia, Legge 180) is the Italian Mental Health Act of 1978 which signified a large reform of the psychiatric system in Italy, contained directives for the closing down of all psychiatric hospitals and led to their gradual replacement with a whole range of community-based services, including settings for acute in-patient care. The Basaglia Law is the basis of Italian mental health legislation. The principal proponent of Law 180 and its architect was Italian psychiatrist Franco Basaglia. Therefore, Law 180 is known as the “Basaglia Law” from the name of its promoter. The Parliament of Italy approved the Law 180 on 13 May 1978, and thereby initiated the gradual dismantling of psychiatric hospitals. Implementation of the psychiatric reform law was accomplished in 1998 which marked the very end of the state psychiatric hospital system in Italy. The Law has had worldwide impact as other counties took up widely the Italian model. It was Democratic Psychiatry which was essential in the birth of the reform law of 1978.

The law itself lasted until 23 December 1978. Then, its articles were incorporated, with very little changes, into a broader law (Italian: legge 23 dicembre 1978, n. 833 - Istituzione del Servizio sanitario nazionale) that introduced the National Health System.

=== Nigeria ===
The Nigeria Mental Health Act is a Nigerian law that regulates the administration of mental health care in the country. The mental Health Act was created in 2023 by the President Muhammadu Buhari government and called the Nigeria Mental Health Act 2021.

=== Singapore ===
The Mental Health (Care and Treatment) Act 2008 of Singapore was passed in 2008 to regulate the involuntary detention of a person in a psychiatric institution for the treatment of a mental disorder, or in the interest of the health and safety of the person or the persons around him.

=== United States ===
==== Employment ====
Title I of the Americans with Disabilities Act of 1990 ("ADA") is a civil rights law that protects individuals with depression, posttraumatic stress disorder ("PTSD"), and other mental health conditions in the workplace. It prohibits employers with 15 or more employees from firing, refusing to hire, or taking other adverse actions against a job applicant or employee based on real or perceived mental health conditions. It also strictly limits the circumstances under which an employer can ask for information about medical conditions, including mental health conditions, and imposes confidentiality requirements on any medical information that the employer does have.

The ADA also requires employers to provide reasonable accommodations to job applicants or employees with mental health conditions under some circumstances. A reasonable accommodation is a special arrangement or piece of equipment that a person needs because of a medical condition to apply for a job, do a job, or enjoy the benefits and privileges of employment. Examples include a flexible schedule, changes in the method of supervision, and permission to work from home. To have the right to a reasonable accommodation, the worker's mental health condition must meet the ADA's definition of a "current disability." Conditions that should easily qualify include major depression, PTSD, bipolar disorder, obsessive-compulsive disorder ("OCD"), and schizophrenia. Other conditions may also qualify, depending on what the symptoms would be if the condition were left untreated, during an active episode (if the condition involves active episodes). The symptoms do not need to be severe or permanent for the condition to be a disability under the ADA.

Under the Family and Medical Leave Act of 1993 (FMLA), certain employees are entitled to up to twelve weeks of job-protected and unpaid leave to recover from a serious illness or to care for a family member with a serious illness, among other reasons. To be eligible, the employer must have had 50 or more employees in 20 or more workweeks in the current or preceding calendar year, or else must be a public agency, elementary school, or secondary school, and the employee must have worked for the employer for at least 12 months, must have at least 1,250 hours of service for the employer during the 12-month period immediately preceding the leave, and must work at a location where the employer has at least 50 employees within 75 miles.

=== United Kingdom ===
Various pieces of legislation including Mental Health Act 1983 and the Mental Capacity Act 2005 govern mental health law giving mental health professionals the ability to commit individuals, treat them without consent and place restrictions on them while in public through outpatient commitment, according to the rules of this legislation. These decisions can be challenged through the mental health tribunals which contain members of the judiciary, though the initial decisions are made by mental health professionals alone.

=== Scotland ===
The Mental Health (Care and Treatment) (Scotland) Act 2003 (asp 13) is an act of the Scottish Parliament which was passed in March 2003, and came into effect on 5 October 2005. The act establishes that medical professionals can legally detain and treat people through short term detention on the grounds of exhibiting signs of mental disorders, with the Mental Health Tribunal for Scotland and the Mental Welfare Commission for Scotland providing safeguards against mistreatment on the grounds of maintaining non-discrimination practices. It received royal assent on 25 April 2003. It largely replaces the Mental Health (Scotland) Act 1984.

== Around the world ==
=== Civil commitment ===
Mental health legislation is largely used in the management of psychiatric disorders, such as dementia or psychosis, and developmental disabilities where a person does not possess the ability to act in a legally competent manner and requires treatment and/or another person to act in his or her best interests. The laws generally cover the requirements and procedures for involuntary commitment and compulsory treatment in a psychiatric hospital or other facility.

In some jurisdictions, court orders are required for compulsory treatment; in others, psychiatrists may treat compulsorily by following set procedures, usually with means of appeal or regular scrutiny to ensure compliance with the law such as through mental health tribunals.

=== Sources of law ===
Mental health law includes areas of both civil and criminal common and statutory law.

Common law is based on long-standing English legal principles, as interpreted through case law. Mental health-related legal concepts include mens rea, insanity defences; legal definitions of "sane," "insane," and "incompetent;" informed consent; and automatism, amongst many others.

Statutory law usually takes the form of a mental health statute. An example is the Mental Health Act 1983 in England and Wales. These acts codify aspects of the treatment of mental illness and provides rules and procedures to be followed and penalties for breaches.

Not all countries have mental health acts. The World Health Report (2001) lists the following percentages, by region, for countries with and without mental health legislation.

Regions	With legislation	No legislation
Africa	59%	41%
The Americas	73%	27%
Eastern Mediterranean	59%	41%
Europe	96%	4%
South-East Asia	67%	33%
Western Pacific	72%	28%

== See also ==
- Bazelon Center for Mental Health Law
- Mental Disability Advocacy Center
- Psychiatric advance directive

== Notes ==
1. Presence of mental health policies and legislation, The World Health Report 2001, chap. 4, fig. 4.1 (accessed June 8, 2005).
