= Mental Health Act =

Stock short title used for legislation

Mental Health Act is a stock short title used for legislation relating to mental health law.

== Canada ==
- The Mental Health Act (Ontario)

== India ==
- The Mental Health Care Act, 2017

== Ireland ==
- The Mental Health Act 2001

== New Zealand ==
- The Mental health (Compulsory Assessment and Treatment) Act 1992

== Republic of Ireland ==
- The Mental Health Act 2001

== Singapore ==
- The Mental Health (Care and Treatment) Act (Singapore) passed in 2008

== United Kingdom ==
- The Mental Health Act 1959 (7 & 8 Eliz. 2. c. 72)
- The Mental Health (Amendment) Act 1982 (c. 51)
- The Mental Health Act 1983 (c. 20), an act of the Parliament of the United Kingdom
- The Mental Health (Scotland) Act 1984 (c. 36), an act of the Parliament of the United Kingdom
- The Mental Health (Detention) (Scotland) Act 1991 (c. 47)
- The Mental Health (Amendment) Act 1994 (c. 6)
- The Mental Health (Patients in the Community) Act 1995 (c. 52)
- The Mental Health (Public Safety and Appeals) (Scotland) Act 1999 (asp 1)
- The Mental Health (Amendment) (Scotland) Act 1999 (c. 32)
- The Mental Health (Care and Treatment) (Scotland) Act 2003 (asp 13), an act of the Scottish Parliament
- The Mental Health Act 2007 (c. 12), an act of the Parliament of the United Kingdom
- The Mental Health (Wales) Measure 2010 (nawm 7)
- The Mental Health (Discrimination) Act 2013 (c. 8)
- The Mental Health Units (Use of Force) Act 2018 (c. 27)

== United States ==
- The National Mental Health Act of 1946, which called for the establishment of a National Institute of Mental Health
- The Community Mental Health Act, created by John F. Kennedy in 1963 as part of his New Frontier
- The Mental Health Parity Act of 1996

== See also ==
- List of short titles
