= State Hospital =

The State Hospital
- State Hospitals Board for Scotland

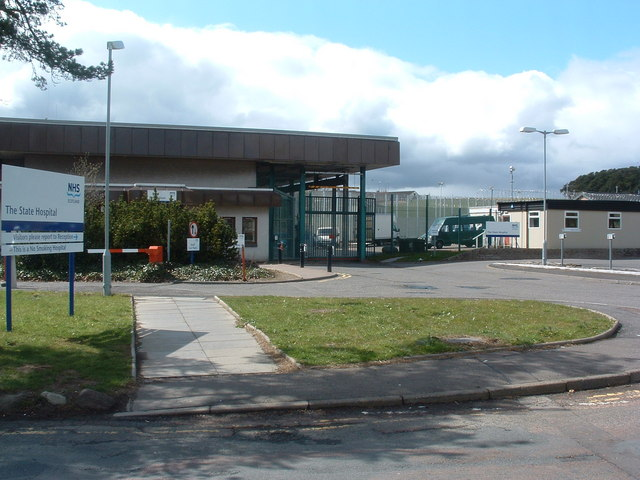
- Entrance to the State Hospital

- Shown in South Lanarkshire

Geography
- Location: Carstairs, South Lanarkshire, Scotland
- Coordinates: 55.695395°N 3.654545°W

Organisation
- Care system: NHS Scotland
- Type: Psychiatric

Services
- Emergency department: No

Links
- Website: www.tsh.scot.nhs.uk
- Lists: Hospitals in Scotland

The State Hospital (also known as Carstairs Hospital, or simply Carstairs) is a psychiatric hospital located close to the villages of Carstairs and Carstairs Junction, in South Lanarkshire, Scotland. It provides care and treatment in conditions of high security for patients from Scotland and Northern Ireland. The hospital is managed by the State Hospitals Board for Scotland which is a public body accountable to the First Minister of Scotland through the Scottish Government Health and Social Care Directorates. It is a Special Health Board, part of the NHS Scotland and the only hospital of its kind within Scotland.

== History ==
Carstairs Hospital was constructed between 1936 and 1939. Although it was planned and financed as a facility for "mental defectives", it was first used as a military hospital, during the Second World War. The War Office relinquished control of the hospital in 1948, when it became the State Institution for Mental Defectives. On 1 October 1957, there was a large transfer of 90 criminally insane prisoners from the criminal lunatic department at HM Prison Perth to Carstairs, and this new combined unit became The State Mental Hospital.

The State Hospitals (Scotland) Act 1994 enabled management of the hospital to be transferred from the Secretary of State for Scotland to NHS Scotland, coming under the control of the State Hospitals Board for Scotland.

A redevelopment of the hospital was approved by the Scottish Government in September 2007. Construction began in April 2008 and the new hospital facilities were officially opened on 26 June 2012.

== Security ==
The hospital has a siren system that is activated if any patient escapes to alert people in the vicinity, including those in the neighbouring town of Lanark, and local villages such as Ravenstruther and Carnwath. The system is tested on the third Thursday of every month at 13:00 when the all clear siren sounds.

One break out happened in 1976, when two patients, Thomas McCulloch and Robert Mone, murdered a nurse, a patient and a police officer with axes in an escape attempt.

== Controversies ==
- In August 1999, Noel Ruddle, a convicted killer was released from Carstairs after his mental illness was deemed untreatable. He admitted that he had not been cured and had also boasted about beating the system. A year after his release, Ruddle was given a community rehabilitation order for threatening to kill a priest. An emergency Bill was brought forward by the Scottish Executive to prevent further exploitation of this loophole, becoming the Mental Health (Public Safety and Appeals) (Scotland) Act 1999, the first Act of the Scottish Parliament. As emergency legislation, it was repealed and replaced by the Mental Health (Care and Treatment) (Scotland) Act 2003 on 5 October 2005.
- In December 2004, Michael Ferguson was allowed an unsupervised visit to see his fiancée at East Kilbride Shopping Centre. He failed to report back to Carstairs staff two hours later as agreed. First Minister Jack McConnell ordered an urgent report into the decision.
- In June 2013, a patient absconded while on an escorted outing to the McArthurGlen shopping centre in Livingston, and was later arrested and taken back into custody after being spotted by members of the public in Hamilton.

== See also ==
- Scottish Prison Service
- Scots law
- Northern Ireland Prison Service
- Northern Ireland law
