= Gartnavel Royal Hospital =

Psychiatric hospital in Glasgow, Scotland

- NHS Greater Glasgow and Clyde
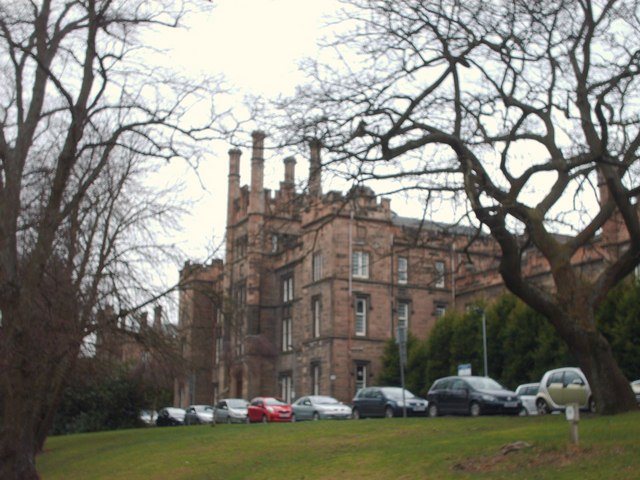
- Gartnavel Royal Hospital

- Shown in Glasgow

Geography
- Location: 1055 Great Western Road, Glasgow, Scotland
- Coordinates: 55.88314°N 4.31798°W

Organisation
- Care system: NHS Scotland
- Type: Psychiatric hospital
- Affiliated university: University of Glasgow

Services
- Emergency department: No
- Beds: 117

History
- Founded: 1814

Links
- Website: Gartnavel Royal Hospital
- Lists: Hospitals in Scotland

Gartnavel Royal Hospital is a mental health facility based in the west end of Glasgow, Scotland. It provides inpatient psychiatric care for the population of the West of the City. It used to house the regional adolescent psychiatric unit but this has recently moved to a new psychiatric unit at Stobhill Hospital. The Hospital is a venue used by the Mental Health Tribunal for Scotland. Some parts of the hospital are classified as a category A building and are also deemed at risk.

== History ==
A Committee of Management for the hospital was formed in 1804 and construction began in the Cowcaddens area of Glasgow in 1810. It was originally opened as the Glasgow Lunatic Asylum in 1814, but after a royal charter was obtained, it became the Glasgow Royal Lunatic Asylum in 1824.

In the 1830s it was decided to commission a new hospital in the Gartnavel area of Glasgow. The new facility, which was designed by Charles Wilson in the Gothic Revival style, allowed segregation by patients' gender and social class. The new hospital opened in 1843.

The hospital first published the Gartnavel Minstrel, the earliest example of a publication written and edited by hospital patients, in 1845. The facility became the Glasgow Royal Mental Hospital in 1931 and, after major additions in 1939 and 1959, it became the Gartnavel Royal Hospital in 1963.

Prominent clinicians who worked at the hospital included Sir David Henderson, who was physician-superintendent at the hospital from 1921 to 1932, Donald Ewen Cameron, who worked at the hospital during the 1920s and R. D. Laing, who worked at the hospital for a number of years during the 1950s.

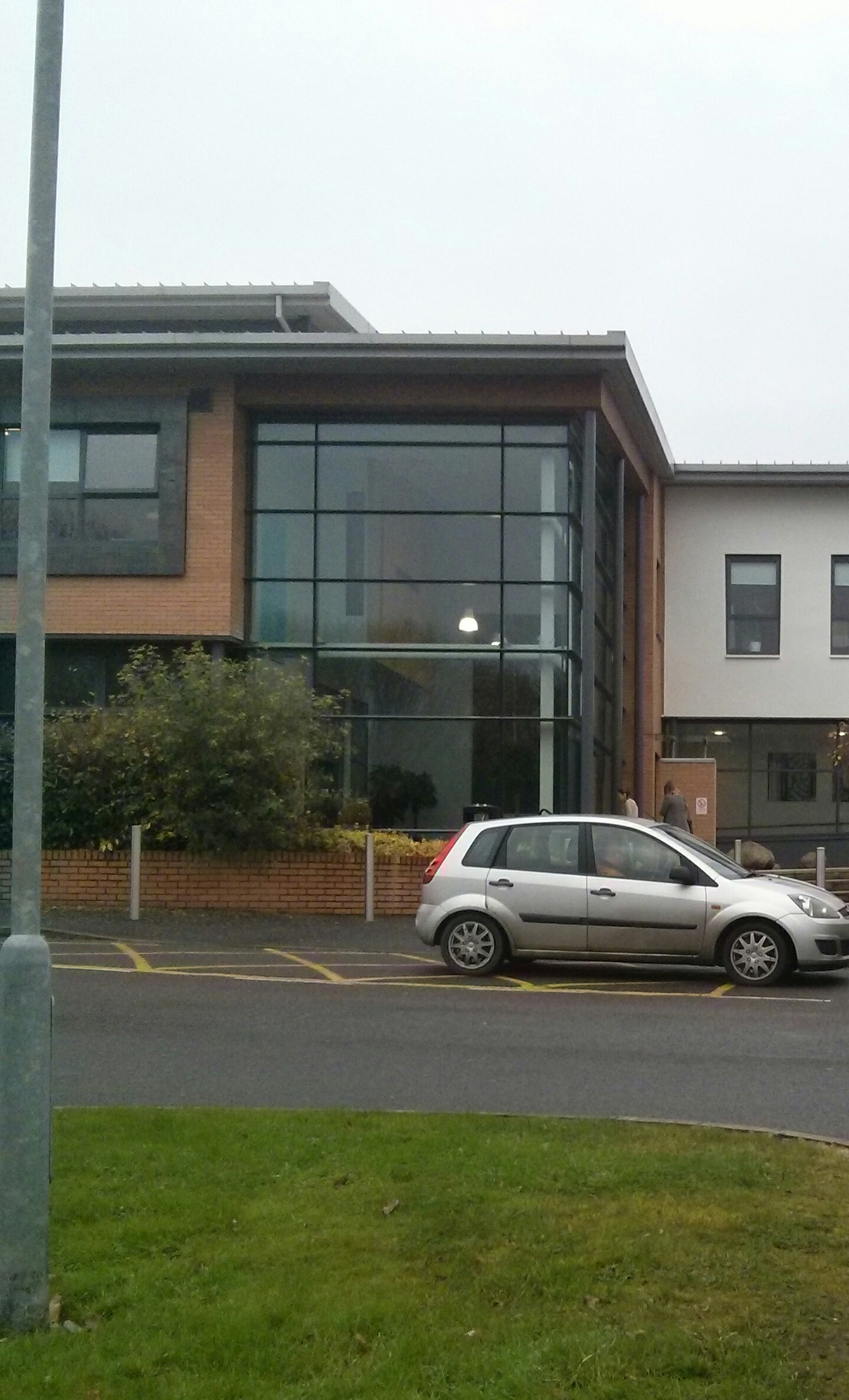
New Gartnavel Royal entrance

The Gartnavel General Hospital opened on the same site in December 1972. A programme of modernisation at the Gartnavel Royal Hospital was completed in 2007, enabling the 117-bed hospital building to serve a significant population of Glaswegian inpatients, along with mental health facilities at Stobhill Hospital and Parkhead Hospital. The modernisation cost £19 million and was said to be "the most modern and innovative building of its kind in the UK" at the time of opening. The 117-bed facility entirely comprised individual rooms, each with its own en-suite bathroom facilities. A community cafe and family room were also created in the hospital.

== Services ==
The hospital houses a series of separate wards located throughout the hospital grounds. The McNair House, Rutherford House and Henderson House wards provide care and treatment for individuals from 16–65 years of age who are experiencing any of a wide range of mental health difficulties of a severe and/or long-term nature.

Cuthbertson House is a critical entry and assessment ward for people whose mental illness has been caused by a brain impairment, also known as organic mental illness – "this type of illness is usually caused by disease affecting the brain. Dementia such as Alzheimer's disease is an example of organic illnesses".

Timbury House is a ward for patients older than 65 who suffer from a functional mental illness – "this type of illness has a predominantly psychological cause. It may include conditions such as depression, schizophrenia, mood disorders or anxiety."

== Controversy ==
=== Joseph Doherty incident ===
On 8 October 1998, an enquiry was held on behalf of the Mental Welfare Commission for Scotland on the death of Joseph Doherty. In 1992 Doherty killed himself with a fatal leap from Erskine Bridge, after telling hospital staff he was going for a walk. This was the eighth incident of suicide between 1985 and 1992, including Joseph Gilmartin who was killed by a bus, a woman found dead after being discharged from the hospital and a woman who strangled herself within the hospital. Doherty suffered from schizophrenia. Doherty was a patient of the Gartnavel Royal Hospital at the time and his family filed a complaint with the hospital. However the investigators reported that they could not make the inquiry results available to Doherty's family. Six years later, during the inquiry, the family were given the outcome of the investigation but not the evidence, with the explanation that the Mental Health (Scotland) Act of 1984 did not allow the Commission to share the information publicly. When the law changed to allow sharing of the report with the complainant as well as with official bodies, Doherty's family were finally allowed this information.

=== Kenneth Pitt incident ===
On 26 July 2006, an inquiry was held on the death of Kenneth Pitt, a patient at Gartnavel Royal Hospital who died at the Western Infirmary. Pitt suffered from psychotic symptoms requiring anti-psychotics and may have had Asperger syndrome. Pitt was a patient of the hospital between 1995 and 1997; hospital staff prescribed him various drugs to treat his symptoms. However, Pitt and his parents believed that he should have been prescribed anti-depressants and were opposed to him being forced to take the medication. Kenneth Pitt's father, Hugh Pitt, brought forward evidence about excessive temperatures in the rooms, inadequate treatment and poor hygiene at the hospital. Samuel Cathcart, Sheriff at the hearing, commented that these issues "are not, however, matters which, in my view, have a direct bearing on Kenneth's death". It was ultimately determined that Kenneth Pitt's death was not able to be prevented.

== See also ==
- List of Category A listed buildings in Glasgow
