= Mental Health (Public Safety and Appeals) (Scotland) Act 1999 =

Act of the Scottish Parliament

Mental Health (Public Safety and Appeals) (Scotland) Act 1999 (Note: Section 4.)
- Act of the Scottish Parliament
- Scottish Parliament
- Long title: An Act of the Scottish Parliament to add public safety to the grounds for not discharging certain patients detained under the Mental Health (Scotland) Act 1984; to provide for appeal against the decision of the sheriff on applications by these patients for their discharge; and to amend the definition of “mental disorder” in that Act.
- Citation: 1999 asp 1
- Introduced by: Jim Wallace
- Territorial extent: Scotland

Dates
- Royal assent: 13 September 1999
- Commencement: 13 September 1999 (Note: Section 4(b) of the Interpretation Act 1978.)
- Repealed: 5 October 2005 (Note: The Mental Health (Care and Treatment) (Scotland) Act 2003 (Commencement No. 4) Order 2005 (SI 2005/161).)

Other legislation
- Amends: Mental Health (Scotland) Act 1984; Criminal Procedure (Scotland) Act 1995
- Repealed by: Mental Health (Care and Treatment) (Scotland) Act 2003

Status: Repealed

History of passage through the Parliament

Text of statute as originally enacted

Text of the Mental Health (Public Safety and Appeals) (Scotland) Act 1999 as in force today (including any amendments) within the United Kingdom, from legislation.gov.uk.

The Mental Health (Public Safety and Appeals) (Scotland) Act 1999 (asp 1) was an act of the Scottish Parliament which was passed by the Parliament in September 1999 and was designed to close a loophole in the law which led to the release of mentally ill killer, Noel Ruddle, who was released from the state hospital at Carstairs after arguing its treatment programmes were no longer of benefit to him. This was the first act passed by the Scottish Parliament after its establishment in 1999.

== Purpose of the act ==
The act had two main purposes:

The first was to add a new criterion to the statutory tests applied by a sheriff or the Scottish Ministers when considering whether to order the discharge of a restricted patient. The sheriff and the Scottish Ministers must now refuse to order a discharge (either conditional or absolute) if satisfied that the patient has a mental disorder, the effect of which is that continuing detention in hospital is necessary to protect the public from serious harm. That is so whether or not the patient is to receive medical treatment for the mental disorder.

The second is to introduce a right of appeal against a decision, notification or recommendation of a sheriff in relation to an appeal brought by a restricted patient in terms of Part VI of the Mental Health (Scotland) Act 1984. The right of appeal against the sheriff’s decision, notification or recommendation is conferred on both the patient and the Scottish Ministers. The appeal is to the Court of Session.

The act also widens the term 'mental disorder', which appears in earlier legislation, to include a personality disorder.

== History ==
In December 1991, Noel Ruddle killed his neighbour with a Kalashnikov rifle. On 20 March 1992, Ruddle pled guilty to several charges at Glasgow High Court and was ordered to be detained and sent to Carstairs State Hospital without limit of time. Ruddle obtained his released in August 1999 after making a legal appeal at the Lanark Sheriff Court on the basis that treatment programmes were no longer of benefit to him. The law at that time said that people who were considered untreatable could not be held, so he was released.

With the risk of other patients at Carstairs making appeals on similar grounds, an emergency bill was quickly brought by the Scottish Executive to the Scottish Parliament. An executive bill was introduced by Jim Wallace on 31 August and some amendments made. passed on 8 September 1999 then gained royal assent on 13 September 1999, becoming the first legislation to be passed by the Parliament.

In 2001, the legislation survived a challenge made to the Judicial Committee of the Privy Council.

The act was repealed on 5 October 2005 by the Mental Health (Care and Treatment) (Scotland) Act 2003.

After being released, Ruddle struggled with substance abuse and was later convicted of threatening to kill a Catholic priest on one occasion and his mother on another occasion.

== See also ==
- List of acts of the Scottish Parliament from 1999
- State Hospital
- Mental Welfare Commission for Scotland
