= Global mental health =

International perspective on mental health

Global mental health is "the area of study, research and practice that places a priority on improving mental health and achieving equity in mental health for all people worldwide." The field focuses on improving the prevention, care, and treatment of mental health disorders globally, along with improving the quality of life for those living with such disorders. This is often with an emphasis on those living in resource-limited settings with less access to mental health treatment.

Like with global health generally, there has been criticism of global mental health as a neo-colonial or "missionary" project. The medicalization of human experiences and treatments has also been criticized for ignoring local conceptualizations and methods for healing. Others have criticized pharmaceutical companies for moving into the global market just to get more clients.

While many in the global mental health field study psychosocial interventions developed by or in collaboration with locals, due to constraints in resources like personnel and time, prescribing medication is often seen as more cost-effective. In recent years, there has been an emphasis on creating community-based, scalable, and sustainable interventions.

Percentage of people suffering from mental disorders in different geographical areas in 2019

The overall aim of the field of global mental health is to strengthen mental health all over the world by providing information about the mental health situation in all countries, as well as identifying mental health care needs in order to develop cost-effective interventions to meet those specific needs.

== The global burden of disease ==
Disability-adjusted life year for neuropsychiatric conditions per 100,000 inhabitants in 2002: no data less than 10 10–20 20–30 30–40 40–50 50–60 60–80 80–100 100–120 120–140 140–150 more than 150

Mental, neurological, and substance use disorders make a substantial contribution to the global burden of disease (GBD). This is a global measure of so-called disability-adjusted life years (DALY's) assigned to a certain disease/disorder, which is a sum of the years lived with disability and years of life lost due to this disease within the total population. Neuropsychiatric conditions account for 14% of the global burden of disease. Among non-communicable diseases, they account for 28% of DALY's – more than cardiovascular disease or cancer. However, it is estimated that the real contribution of mental disorders to the global burden of disease is even higher, due to the complex interactions and co-morbidity of physical and mental illness.

Around the world, almost one million people die due to suicide every year, and it is the third leading cause of death among young people. The most important causes of disability due to health-related conditions worldwide include unipolar depression, alcoholism, schizophrenia, bipolar depression and dementia. In low- and middle-income countries, these conditions represent a total of 19.1% of all disability-related health conditions.

According to Paul and Moser's meta-analysis, countries with high income inequality and poor unemployment protections have worse mental health outcomes among the unemployed. One article claimed 76%-85% of these said countries cannot provide care. Roughly 14% of adolescents have mental health challenges as well.

== Mental health by region ==
=== Africa ===
Mental illnesses and mental health disorders are widespread concerns among underdeveloped African countries, yet these issues are largely neglected, as mental health care in Africa is given statistically less attention than it is in other, westernized nations. Rising death tolls due to mental illness demonstrate the imperative need for improved mental health care policies and advances in treatment for Africans suffering from psychological disorders.

Underdeveloped African countries are so visibly troubled by physical illnesses, disease, malnutrition, and contamination that the dilemma of lacking mental health care has not been prioritized, makes it challenging to have a recognized impact on the African population. In 1988 and 1990, two original resolutions were implemented by the World Health Organization's Member States in Africa. AFR/RC39/R1 and AFR/RC40/R9 attempted to improve the status of mental health care in specific African regions to combat its growing effects on the African people. However, it was found that these new policies had little impact on the status of mental health in Africa, ultimately resulting in an incline in psychological disorders instead of the desired decline, and causing this to seem like an impossible problem to manage.

In Africa, many socio-cultural and biological factors have led to heightened psychological struggles, while also masking their immediate level of importance to the African eye. Increasing rates of unemployment, violence, crime, rape, and disease are often linked to substance abuse, which can cause mental illness rates to inflate. Additionally, physical disease like HIV/AIDS, the Ebola epidemic, and malaria often have lasting psychological effects on victims that go unrecognized in African communities because of their inherent cultural beliefs. Traditional African beliefs have led to the perception of mental illness as being caused by supernatural forces, preventing helpful or rational responses to abnormal behavior. For example, Ebola received loads of media attention when it became rampant in Africa and eventually spread to the US, however, researchers never really paid attention to its psychological effects on the African brain. Extreme anxiety, struggles with grief, feelings of rejection and incompetence, depression leading to suicide, PTSD, and much more are only some of the noted effects of diseases like Ebola. These epidemics come and go, but their lasting effects on mental health are remaining for years to come, and even ending lives because of the lack of action. There has been some effort to financially fund psychiatric support in countries like Liberia, due to its dramatic mental health crisis after warfare, but not much was benefited. Aside from financial reasons, it is so difficult to enforce mental health interventions and manage mental health in general in underdeveloped countries simply because the individuals living there do not necessarily believe in western psychiatry. It is also important to note that the socio-cultural model of psychology and abnormal behavior is dependent on factors surrounding cultural differences. This causes mental health abnormalities to remain more hidden due to the culture's natural behavior, compared to westernized behavior and cultural norms.

This relationship between mental and physical illness is an ongoing cycle that has yet to be broken. While many organizations are attempting to solve problems about physical health in Africa, as these problems are clearly visible and recognizable, there is little action taken to confront the underlying mental effects that are left on the victims. It is recognized that many of the mentally ill in Africa search for help from spiritual or religious leaders, however this is widely because many African countries are significantly lacking in mental health professionals in comparison to the rest of the world. In Ethiopia alone, there are "only 10 psychiatrists for the population of 61 million people," studies have shown. While numbers have definitely changed since this research was done, the lack of psychological professionals throughout African continues with a current average of 1.4 mental health workers per 100,000 people compared to the global statistic of 9.0 professionals per 100,000 people. Additionally, statistics show that the "global annual rate of visits to mental health outpatient facilities is 1,051 per 100,000 population," while "in Africa the rate is 14 per 100,000" visits. About half of Africa's countries have some sort of mental health policy, however, these policies are highly disregarded, as Africa's government spends "less than 1% of the total health budget on mental health". Specifically in Sierra Leone, about 98.8% of people suffering from mental disorders remain untreated, even after the building of a well below average psychiatric hospital, further demonstrating the need for intervention.

Not only has there been little hands-on action taken to combat mental health issues in Africa, but there has also been little research done on the topic to spread its awareness and prevent deaths. The Lancet Global Health acknowledges that there are well over 1,000 published articles covering physical health in Africa, but there are still less than 50 discussing mental health. And this pressing dilemma of prioritizing physical health vs. mental health is only worsening as the continent's population is substantially growing with research showing that "Between 2000 and 2015 the continent's population grew by 49%, yet the number of years lost to disability as a result of mental and substance use disorders increased by 52%". The number of deaths caused by mental instability is truly competing with those caused by physical diseases: "In 2015, 17.9 million years were lost to disability as a consequence of mental health problems. Such disorders were almost as important a cause of years lost to disability as were infectious and parasitic diseases, which accounted for 18.5 million years lost to disability,". Mental health and physical health care, while they may seem separate, are very much connected, as these two factors determine life or death for humans. As new challenges surface and old challenges still haven't been prioritized, Africa's mental health care policies need significant improvement in order to provide its people with the appropriate health care they deserve, hopefully preventing this problem from expanding.

=== Western Pacific ===
The World Health Organization (WHO) Western Pacific Region comprises 38 countries and approximately 2.2 billion people– nearly a fourth of the global population. Nearly 10 percent of this population (~215 million individuals) struggles with poor mental health. Vast variation in the mental health infrastructures throughout the Western Pacific poses a challenge for consistent, reliable mental health care across the region. Regional mental health leadership and initiatives remain largely fragmented, inhibiting the potential to address growing concerns relating to rapid urbanisation, proliferation of drug supplies and abuse, climate change vulnerability, and economic deprivation, among other issues. The Western Pacific Region accounted for a quarter of suicide mortality in 2019.

In the region's low- and middle-income countries (LMICs) (Cambodia, China, Fiji, Kiribati, Laos, Malaysia, the Marshall Islands, Mongolia, Papua New Guinea, the Philippines, the Solomon Islands, Tonga, Tuvalu, Vanuatu, and Viet Nam), child and adolescent mental health is particularly at risk, with this population accounting for nearly 18 percent of DALYs attributed to mental illness and substance abuse. Despite this, most of the region's LMICs allocated ≤1% of their total mental health spending on Child and Adolescent Mental Health (CAMH). This presents a particularly problematic situation, given that over 30% of these countries' populations are composed of individuals between 0 and 24 years of age and given that approximately three-quarters of lifetime cases of mental disorders develop in this age range. This signals the necessity of developing early-intervention mental health initiatives in the region.

=== Latin America and the Caribbean ===
In Latin America, there is an overall large deficit of resources available for mental health services, especially in countries undergoing economic stress and even war. The majority of Latin American countries denote less than 2% of their total budget to mental health policies and infrastructure, and approximately 25% of people studied within the region reportedly having mental disorders. However, only 2% of the literature about mental health is about Latin America. Of that 2%, only 4% is represented by people from Latin America. In a study of 214 Latin American and South American psychiatrists, most of them were female and roughly 75% of them were from Uruguay, Venezuela, and Bolivia. A study done by a different source had female and male children and adolescents who lived in urban areas in South America as their participants.

=== Middle East ===
The study of mental health in the Middle East is an area of research that continues to grow in its scope and content. As of May 10, 2019, WHO study shows over 70 countries and territories across six regions, including Egypt, Iraq, Jordan, Lebanon, the occupied Palestinian territory, Qatar, Syria, Tunisia, the UAE, and Yemen, have prioritized coverage of mental health conditions.

To accurately evaluate and understand the mental health issues of the Middle East, one must take into account the geographic, historical, cultural, and social influences of that part of the world. While each of the many countries commonly considered part of the "Middle East" is unique, there is a binding ethnic fabric that should be considered. Firstly, the Middle East is the origin of many of the major world religions. Christianity, Judaism and Islam, all began in this region. Of these many religions, Islam has had the most lasting and culturally significant influence on the region, encompassing well over ninety percent (90%) of the population by some measurements. The tenets of the Islamic faith, and its strict purpose, certainly have served as both a guide and a hindrance to the practices' of mental health care providers in the Middle East. There is a conflict between ancient religious teachings and the modern day or "Western world" approach to the issues of mental health.

== Mental health by country ==
=== Argentina ===
In different periods of Argentina's history, mental health treatment involved institutionalizing and isolating patients. In 2010, the Argentine Civil Code was established, which has legal guidelines to promote community-based mental health practices. The care of people with mental health challenges, as well as those who use substances, are now guaranteed the right to care.

=== Australia ===
Mental health in Australia involves state, private and community sector intervention in mental health issues. 20% of Australians experiences one or more mental health episodes in their lifetime. Australia runs on a mixed health care system, with both public and private health care. The public system includes a government run insurance scheme called Medicare, which aids mental health schemes. Each state within Australia has its own management plans for mental health treatment. However, the overarching system and spending remains the same.

A survey conducted by Australian Bureau of Statistics in 2008 regarding adults with manageable to severe neurosis reveals almost half of the population had a mental disorder at some point of their life and one in five people had a sustained disorder in the preceding 12 months. In neurotic disorders, 14% of the population experienced anxiety and comorbidity disorders were next to common mental disorder with vulnerability to substance abuse and relapses. There were distinct gender differences in disposition to mental health illness. Women were found to have high rate of mental health disorders, and Men had higher propensity of risk for substance abuse. The SMHWB survey showed families that had low socioeconomic status and high dysfunctional patterns had a greater proportional risk for mental health disorders. A 2010 survey regarding adults with psychosis revealed 5 persons per 1000 in the population seeks professional mental health services for psychotic disorders and the most common psychotic disorder was schizophrenia.

=== Bangladesh ===
Mental health disorder is considered a major public health concern and it constitutes about 13% of the Global Burden of disease and severe mental health disease may reduce each individual's life expectancy by about 20%. Low and middle-income countries have a higher burden of mental health disorder as it is not considered as a health problem as other chronic diseases. Being a low-income country, in Bangladesh, mental health issues are highly stigmatized.

A community-based study in the rural area of Bangladesh in 2000-2001 estimated that the burden of mental morbidity was 16.5% among rural people and most were suffering from mainly depression and anxiety and which was one-half and one-third of total cases respectively. Furthermore, the prevalence of mental disorders was higher in women in large families aged 45 years.

A study conducted in 2008 stated that only 16% of patients came directly to the Mental Health Practitioner with a mean delay of 10.5 months of the onset of mental illness, which made them more vulnerable in many ways. 22% of patients went for the religious or traditional healer and 12% consulted a rural medical practitioner with the least delay of 2-2.5 weeks.

=== Brazil ===
The Brazilian Unified National Health System was founded in 1988, an important event signifying the start of Brazil's psychiatric reform. This promoted a large expansion of mental health services in the country, significantly in the late 20th and early 21st century, with Centers for Psychological Care (CAPS) being one, for example. CAPS is an overnight care center that provides a bed and comfort for people experiencing psychological emergencies.

However, following 2011, there has been a large drop in research and expanded community services. A lack of education and research has also accompanied the decline in mental health resources.

=== Canada ===
According to statistics released by the Centre of Addiction and Mental Health one in five people in Canada experience a mental health or addiction problem. Young people of ages 15 to 25 are particularly found to be vulnerable. Major depression is found to affect 8% and anxiety disorder 12% of the population. Women are 1.5 times more likely to suffer from mood and anxiety disorders. WHO points out that there are distinct gender differences in patterns of mental health and illness. The lack of power and control over their socioeconomic status, gender based violence; low social position and responsibility for the care of others render women vulnerable to mental health risks. Since more women than men seek help regarding a mental health problem, this has led to not only gender stereotyping but also reinforcing social stigma. WHO has found that this stereotyping has led doctors to diagnose depression more often in women than in men even when they display identical symptoms. Often communication between health care providers and women is authoritarian leading to either the under-treatment or over-treatment of these women.

Women's College Hospital has a program called the "Women's Mental Health Program" where doctors and nurses help treat and educate women regarding mental health collaboratively, individually, and online by answering questions from the public.

Another Canadian organization serving mental health needs is the Centre for Addiction and Mental Health (CAMH). CAMH is one of Canada's largest and most well-known health and addiction facilities, and it has received international recognitions from the Pan American Health Organization and World Health Organization Collaborating Centre. They do research in areas of addiction and mental health in both men and women. In order to help both men and women, CAMH provides "clinical care, research, education, policy development and health promotion to help transform the lives of people affected by mental health and addiction issues." CAMH is different from Women's College Hospital due to its widely known rehab centre for women who have minor addiction issues, to severe ones. This organization provides care for mental health issues by assessments, interventions, residential programs, treatments, and doctor and family support.

=== China ===
Experts have estimated that about 130 million adults living in the People's Republic of China are suffering from a mental disorder. It is estimated that one in six people in the country will eventually have to deal with mental health issues. The desire to seek treatment is largely hindered by China's strict social norms (and subsequent stigmas), as well as religious and cultural beliefs regarding personal reputation and social harmony.

As of 2016, 13 percent of China's non-communicable disease burden was attributable to disorders of mental health, suggesting a significant public health concern. A 2012 cross-sectional epidemiological study conducted among adults in 31 Chinese provinces found that the lifetime prevalence of mental disorders (excluding dementia) was close to 17 percent. Anxiety disorders were the most common, with a lifetime prevalence of 7.6 percent. This study found that while the prevalence of psychotic disorders has remained more or less stable, the prevalence of non-psychotic disorders has increased relative to earlier Chinese studies.

Treatment for severe mental disorders remains extremely low, with only around 150 per 100,000 of these cases receiving care. State spending on psychiatric hospitals also remains minimal at approximately US1.07perperson(comparedtoanaverageofUS35.06 per person in other high-income countries), and the ratio of mental health providers to patients is much lower than in other developed nations. However, China's mental healthcare has recently been the target of notable policy efforts, such as the Mental Health Law of the People's Republic of China and the "China Brain" project, which signal increased attention being directed towards mental well-being and mental health research.

=== India ===
Mental healthcare in India is a right secured to every person in the country by law. Indian mental health legislation, as per a 2017 study, meets 68% (119/175) of the World Health Organization (WHO) standards laid down in the WHO Checklist of Mental Health Legislation. However, human resources and expertise in the field of mental health in India is significantly low when compared to the population of the country. The allocation of the national healthcare budget to mental health is also low, standing at 0.16%. India's mental health policy was released in 2014.

The first Western-style mental healthcare institutions date back to the factories of the East India Company in the 17th century. Mental healthcare in colonial India and the years post-independence was custodial and segregationist. It slowly moved towards a more curative and therapeutic nature by the end of the 20th century. Public interest litigations and judicial intervention, followed by reviews and monitoring of the National Human Rights Commission and National Institute of Mental Health and Neurosciences, coupled with an expansion of facilities for developing human resources in the field of mental healthcare, among other changes, has all positively contributed to the state of mental health and healthcare in the country.

With a large, diverse population of around 1.47 billion, mental health issues are an immediate concern in India. Approximately 15% of individuals in India struggle with mental health, including a large variety of disorders like depression, schizophrenia, anxiety disorders, and many more. Mental health struggles in India impact many areas of society, such as personal and professional success, economic growth, productivity, and healthcare burdens. In fact, according to the World Health Organization, an estimated US$1.03 trillion will be lost between 2012 and 2030 due to mental health. Additionally, stigma around mental health challenges are perpetuated in many Indian communities, causing individuals to resist seeking help and exacerbating negative consequences.

Gender inequalities are a significant source of many mental health challenges. Women are generally more vulnerable to mental health disorders due to factors such as power imbalances, limited access to education, and abuse. For example, the risk of anxiety disorders is 2-3 times higher in women than in men. According to Malhotra et al., using data from the World Health Organization in 2001, "Depressive disorders account for close to 41.9% of the disability from neuropsychiatric disorders among women compared to 29.3% among men."

=== Iran ===
Mental health disorders are a major burden in Iran. According to a literature review conducted by Zandi et al., individuals with a lower socioeconomic status were prone to higher instances of mental health challenges, due to factors such as a lack of access to affordable, quality care. Additionally, minorities and undocumented individuals faced higher rates of poor mental health outcomes, caused by an insufficient access to healthcare. Women are also more vulnerable to mental health disorders because of gender inequalities and power imbalances. Iran's socioeconomic disparities intensify mental health struggles, and healthcare systems are generally under-resourced to support the ongoing, worsening conditions.

=== Ireland ===
Mental health in the Republic of Ireland is the subject of state and community sector intervention in Ireland. The Irish state devolves responsibility for mental health to the Department of Health. Community groups and charities also provide support in the prevention and management of mental illness as well as suicide prevention.

=== Israel ===
In Israel, a Mental Health Insurance Reform took effect in July 2015, transferring responsibility for the provision of mental health services from the Ministry of Health to the four national health plans. Physical and mental health care were united under one roof; previously they had functioned separately in terms of finance, location, and provider. Under the reform, the health plans developed new services or expanded existing ones to address mental health problems.

=== Japan ===
A 2016 study estimated that approximately a fifth of Japan's population had experienced a common mental disorder (CMD) at any point in their lifetime. CMDs include depression, generalised anxiety disorder (GAD), panic disorder, phobias, social anxiety disorder, obsessive-compulsive disorder (OCD), and post-traumatic stress disorder (PTSD). Alcohol abuse was found to be the most common mental health disorder, with a population lifetime prevalence of 7.3 percent. Most disorders were classified as "moderate" or "mild" (approximately 44 and 41 percent, respectively), though a significant portion (15 percent) of diagnoses were classified as "severe," and only 37 percent of these cases received care. Overall, "only 21.9% of respondents with any 12-month disorder sought treatment within the last 12 months." According to the World Mental Health Japan (WMHJ) 2nd Survey, lifetime prevalence for any CMD was greater among males, though persistence was greater among females. Overall, the nationwide prevalence of CMDs remained stable from the time of the first WMHJ survey.

Since the mid-1900s, Japan's mental healthcare system has been largely situated within the clinical hospital contexts – relying heavily on inpatient care – as a result of 1950s legislation that banned "home confinement" and allowed for involuntary institutionalisation. This period, however, saw "untoward growth in inpatient admissions, deterioration in the quality of inpatient treatment, and prolonged hospitalization," which eventually led to policy changes in the mid-90s that began to shift the country's mental healthcare system toward more community-centered care initiatives. Such efforts include "home-visit nursing care, administered by medical institutions, outpatient clinics, nursing stations, and administrative home-visit services arranged by municipalities and Public Health Centers (PHCs)" as well as localised Mental Health and Welfare Centers (MHWCs). While important strides have been made toward this kind of community-integrated care, institutionalised care still represents a significant portion of mental health treatment in the country.

=== Kyrgyzstan ===
Mental health in Kyrgyzstan encompasses the prevalence, treatment, as well as social and economic effects of mental illness in Kyrgyzstan. It has been estimated that approximately 11% of the country's population lives with a mental health condition, which coupled with a lack of adequate mental health services, has resulted in a range of negative outcomes for Kyrgyzstani society.

=== Malaysia ===
Mental health in Malaysia encompasses the prevalence, social and economic burden, and treatment of mental health disorders in Malaysia.

Studies have indicated a high prevalence of mental disorders among adolescents and adults in Malaysia. For example, a 2015 survey indicated that almost 40% of adults in the Malaysian capital Kuala Lumpur met the criteria for a mental disorder. Furthermore, the prevalence of mental disorders among the Malaysian population was found to have increased three-fold between 1996 and 2015. This has been attributed to rapid cultural and lifestyle changes, which has led to an increased level of perceived stress among Malaysia's population.

=== Mexico ===
Approximately 6.4 million people in Mexico suffer with depression, with an estimated 2.1% of the population suffering with schizophrenia and a little more than 9% suffering with alcoholism. A strong factor contributing these mental health conditions likely the inequality present within the country, with many people constantly stressed about economic disparity. One article claimed suicide is one of the highest causes of death in people of 15–29 years of age. Between 2013 and 2021, the economic budget for mental health decreased by 9.6%, and a vast majority of services went to psychiatric hospitals, which takes mental health resources away from the wider community.

=== New Zealand ===
Mental health in New Zealand generally follows the trends of mental health in other OECD countries. New Zealand's 'outdoor life style' and high standard of living are balanced by isolation and a self-reliant culture, which discourages asking for help. Historically, people with mental health problems were institutionalised, whereas now the focus is on care in the wider community. The stigma around poor mental health has been lessened in recent years as a result of this change and public education campaigns. However, New Zealand's minorities and youth continue to be over-represented in the negative mental health statistics.

=== Nigeria ===
The Nigeria Mental Health Act is a Nigerian law that regulates the administration of mental health care in the country. The mental Health Act was created in 2023 by the President Muhammadu Buhari government and called the Nigeria Mental Health Act 2021.

=== Palestine ===
The mental health of Palestinians has been described as among the worst in the world, with over half of Palestinian adults meeting the diagnostic threshold for depression and a significant portion of Palestinian children experiencing mental distress, particularly in Gaza. This high prevalence of mental distress among the Palestinian population has been attributed to the intersection of a number of factors, including exposure to conflict, poor living conditions and restrictions on movement.

=== Philippines ===
Mental health in the Philippines is the survey of the status of psychological, psychiatric, and emotional healthcare in the country.

Beliefs about mental illness in the Philippines have evolved from precolonial views of supernatural causes (requiring intervention from a babaylan or folk healer) to the introduction of institutional care with the Spanish colonization.

=== Puerto Rico ===
Puerto Rico has been in economic crisis for a long time due to its unpayable debt. As of 2015 it is 72 billion dollars. The mounting debt has caused much damage to the society in question. Cutbacks on a lot of necessities in the island have caused a health care problem. In the mental health care, the problem grows bigger as people find themselves unemployed or with lack of good jobs a lot of people have left the island, causing a lack of professionals.

=== Russia ===
Mental health in Russia is covered by a law, known under its official name—the Law of the Russian Federation "On Psychiatric Care and Guarantees of Citizens' Rights during Its Provision" (Russian: Зако́н Росси́йской Федера́ции «О психиатри́ческой по́мощи и гара́нтиях прав гра́ждан при её оказа́нии», Zakon Possiyskoy Federatsii "O psikhiatricheskoy pomoshchi i garantyakh prav grazhdan pri yeyo okazanii"), which is the basic legal act that regulates psychiatric care in the Russian Federation and applies not only to persons with mental disorders but all citizens. A notable exception of this rule is those vested with parliamentary or judicial immunity. Providing psychiatric care is regulated by a special law regarding guarantees of citizens' rights.

Due to this fact, it is acknowledged that functions of psychiatry are not limited to identifying and removing biological anomalies that cause "mental illnesses", caring for patients and alleviating their sufferings, but they also apply to the scope of their civil rights. The passage of the law was one of the five conditions for the membership of the All-Union Society of Psychiatrists and Neuropathologists in the World Psychiatric Association. The law passed on 2 July 1992 and received the number 3185-1.

=== Singapore ===
Mental health in Singapore comprises the mental healthcare systems in Singapore and the mental health of people staying in Singapore. Singapore opened its first psychiatric hospital, the Institute of Mental Health, in 1928, and all general hospitals currently have psychiatry departments. Major depressive disorder is the most common mental illness in Singapore, with about six percent of the population suffering from it. Alcohol abuse and obsessive–compulsive disorder are the second and third most prevalent mental illnesses, with incidences of 4.2% and 3.6% respectively. 13.9% of the population in Singapore has experienced either a mood, anxiety, or alcohol abuse disorder in their lifetimes, with more than 75% never seeking professional help. Rates of mental illness have been increasing since 2010, and a large treatment gap exists for mentally ill populations.

=== Somalia ===
Somalia has been described as having one of the world's highest rates of mental illness, with one in three Somalis meeting the diagnostic threshold for some form of mental illness. This has been attributed to the ongoing Somali Civil War, political instability, and natural disasters. Despite the high prevalence of mental illness among the Somali population, mental health services are almost non-existent in Somalia.

=== South Korea ===
Over the past few decades, mental health has become an increasingly serious issue in health in South Korea. A 2021 survey conducted by the Ministry of Health and Welfare found that 32.7% of males and 22.9% of females in South Korea developed symptoms of mental illness at least one time in their lives. Suicide in South Korea is the most frequent cause of death for people aged 9 to 24. Mental health issues are most common among the elderly and adolescents.

Since the late 1990s, South Korea has been enacting policies to address societal mental health challenges. These efforts increased into the late 2000s and 2010s, but a number of studies have suggested they have not significantly reduced the prevalence of such concerns. One significant challenge is that these efforts are consistently found to be underutilized. A number of proposed explanations exist for this underutilization, including societal stigma due to Korean Confucianist concerns over losing face, lack of understanding about the symptoms of mental illness, and low awareness of what resources are available.

=== Turkmenistan ===
Mental health in Turkmenistan encompasses the prevalence, treatment, as well as societal effects of mental health conditions in the country. According to a 2020 report from the World Health Organization (WHO), there are currently no published research articles on mental health in Turkmenistan, and similarly, other data on the topic is lacking.

=== United Kingdom ===
Mental health in the United Kingdom involves state, private and community sector intervention in mental health issues. One of the first countries to build asylums, the United Kingdom was also one of the first countries to turn away from them as the primary mode of treatment for the mentally ill. The 1960s onwards saw a shift towards Care in the Community, which is a form of deinstitutionalisation. The majority of mental health care is now provided by the National Health Service (NHS), assisted by the private and the voluntary sectors.

=== United States ===
According to the World Health Organization in 2004, depression is the leading cause of disability in the United States for individuals ages 15 to 44. Absence from work in the U.S. due to depression is estimated to be in excess of $31 billion per year. Depression frequently co-occurs with a variety of medical illnesses such as heart disease, cancer, and chronic pain and is associated with poorer health status and prognosis. Each year, roughly 30,000 Americans take their lives, while hundreds of thousands make suicide attempts (Centers for Disease Control and Prevention). In 2004, suicide was the 11th leading cause of death in the United States (Centers for Disease Control and Prevention), third among individuals ages 15–24. Despite the increasing availability of effectual depression treatment, the level of unmet need for treatment remains high. By way of comparison, a study conducted in Australia during 2006 to 2007 reported that one-third (34.9%) of patients diagnosed with a mental health disorder had been presented to medical health services for treatment. The US has a shortage of mental healthcare workers, contributing to the unmet need for treatment. The US will need an additional 15,400 psychiatrists and 57,490 psychologists to meet the demand for treatment.

== Treatment gap ==
In 2019, it was estimated that one in every eight people in the world live with a mental disorder. Although many effective interventions for the treatment of mental disorders are known, and awareness of the need for treatment of people with mental disorders has risen, the proportion of those who need mental health care but who do not receive it remains very high. This so-called "treatment gap" is estimated to reach between 76 and 85% for low- and middle-income countries, and 35–50% for high-income countries. According to the National Alliance on Mental Illness, 33.5% of U.S. adults with a serious mental illness and 53.8% of U.S. adults with a mental illness received no treatment for it in the year 2020.

Despite the acknowledged need, for the most part there have not been substantial changes in mental health care delivery during the past years. Main reasons for this problem are public health priorities, lack of a mental health policy and legislation in many countries, a lack of resources – financial and human resources – as well as inefficient resource allocation.

In 2011, the World Health Organization estimated a shortage of 1.18 million mental health professionals, including 55,000 psychiatrists, 628,000 nurses in mental health settings, and 493,000 psychosocial care providers needed to treat mental disorders in 144 low- and middle-income countries. The annual wage bill to remove this health workforce shortage was estimated at US$4.4 billion.

== Interventions ==
Information and evidence about cost-effective interventions to provide better mental health care are available. Although most of the research (80%) has been carried out in high-income countries, there is also strong evidence from low- and middle-income countries that pharmacological and psychosocial interventions are effective ways to treat mental disorders, with the strongest evidence for depression, schizophrenia, bipolar disorder and hazardous alcohol use.

A systematic review of trials in low- and middle-income countries have found that psychological treatments delivered by non-specialist providers, such as community health workers or peers, reduce symptoms of common mental disorders.

Recommendations to strengthen mental health systems around the world have been first mentioned in the WHO's World Health Report 2001, which focused on mental health:

1. Provide treatment in primary care
2. Make psychotropic drugs available
3. Give care in the community
4. Educate the public
5. Involve communities, families and consumers
6. Establish national policies, programs and legislation
7. Develop human resources
8. Link with other sectors
9. Monitor community mental health
10. Support more research

Based on the data of 12 countries, assessed by the WHO Assessment Instrument for Mental Health Systems (WHO-AIMS), the costs of scaling up mental health services by providing a core treatment package for schizophrenia, bipolar affective disorder, depressive episodes and hazardous alcohol use have been estimated. Structural changes in mental health systems according to the WHO recommendations have been taken into account.

For most countries, this model suggests an initial period of investment of US$0.30 – 0.50 per person per year. The total expenditure on mental health would have to rise at least ten-fold in low-income countries. In those countries, additional financial resources will be needed, while in middle- and high-income countries the main challenge will be the reallocation of resources within the health system to provide better mental health service.

=== Telemental health ===
In low- and middle income countries there is an increasing demand for telepsychiatry which means offering mental health services through telecommunications technology (mostly videoconferencing and phone calls). This is especially pronounced due to the lack of access to quality healthcare, underfunding and low awareness of mental health issues. In a global health context telemental health may offer access to high-quality mental health services for a wider range of people. At the same time there are concerns around data security and challenges regarding proper infrastructure, capacity, access and skills.

== Prevention ==
Prevention is beginning to appear in mental health strategies, including the 2004 WHO report "Prevention of Mental Disorders", the 2008 EU "Pact for Mental Health" and the 2011 US National Prevention Strategy. NIMH or the National Institute of Mental Health has over 400 grants.

Should you have experienced four or more adverse childhood experiences, you're 3.2 to 4.0 times more likely to suffer from depression, as well as from various other health problems.

The Centers for Disease Control and Prevention (CDC) examines the close link of physical and mental health. Not only can mental health disorders increase the risk of physical ailments, but chronic conditions can also lead to higher risks of mental illness. Therefore, addressing both mental and physical health is essential to overall wellbeing.

According to the CDC, there are a number of risk factors that can contribute to developing a mental health disorder. For example, lack of education, limited employment and economic opportunities, social struggles and isolation, and substance use can all increase the risk of developing a mental health condition. Therefore, preventative measures against mental health conditions include fulfilling and healthy social relationships, having access to healthcare and support, and having economic and educational opportunities.

== Campaigns ==
There are many different campaigns that are being run around the world that are trying to help all people with their mental health. Here some examples of campaigns around the world, from high-level stakeholders:

The Power of Okay is a campaign that is run by a government's funded company in Scotland called "See Me". This campaign is mainly focused on mental health in the workplace. It touches on two sides of the system. One being the individual struggling with mental health and not knowing how, or if they should tell anyone. Two being a staff member seeing their colleague struggling, but not knowing how to bring it up, or being worried about saying the wrong thing. This campaign was made to encourage people to reach out to their colleagues, family members, friends, neighbors, and ask the question, "are you okay?"

Not Myself Today is another campaign that has started and is run in Canada, connected with the European Brain Council (EBC). This campaign is more focused on helping mental health in a workplace setting. It is trying to help companies raise awareness, reduce stigma, and build a supportive community. Not Myself Today is a program that any company can get registered for online. Once registered the company will get a comprehensive Not Myself Today toolkit and member online access. You then can engage in the provided material and evaluation surveys, which help see how the program is impacting your workplace.

Better Health-Every Mind Matters is a campaign that is commissioned by Public Health England (PHE). With this campaign PHE is trying to bring to light the struggles and difficulties that have come after COVID-19. This campaign's goal is to support people to take action to look after their mental health and wellbeing, and to also help support those that are around them. The PHE encourages people to get a free NHS approved mind plan. This can be done by answering five questions through Every Mind Matters website. After answering these questions, you will get a personalized plan with tips to help you with what you are currently struggling with.

Stop The Stigma is a campaign that was started by the Canadian Mental Health association (CAMH). With this campaign CAMH came out with some ads of people talking in their workplace. These ads would have someone of a higher status, like a manager or a boss talking about their employees who had cancer. Instead of talking about it in a sincere and sympathetic way, they would talk about it in the way that most people talk about mental health. They would use phrases like, "Is it just a made-up illness to get out of work?" or "Just take something, stuck it up and get back to work." This just shows how insincere people can be about mental health and puts in perspective that things need to change.

The world health organization (WHO) teamed up with United for Global Mental Health and the World Federation of Mental Health and are campaigning for World Mental Health Day (10 October). With this campaign WHO is looking to host a global online advocacy event on mental health. The United for Global Mental Health group also wants to have a 24-hour march for mental health that has livestreamed content from experts that talk about ways to increase awareness and break down the stigma around mental health.

== Stakeholders ==
=== World Health Organization (WHO) ===
Two of WHO's core programmes for mental health are WHO MIND (Mental health improvements for Nations Development) and Mental Health Gap Action Programme (mhGAP).

WHO MIND focuses on 5 areas of action to ensure concrete changes in people's daily lives. These are:

1. Action in and support to countries to improve mental health, such as the WHO Pacific Island Mental Health network (PIMHnet)
2. Mental health policy, planning and service development
3. Mental health human rights and legislation
4. Mental health as a core part of human development
5. The QualityRights Project which works to unite and empower people to improve the quality of care and promote human rights in mental health facilities and social care homes.

Mental Health Gap Action Programme (mhGAP) is WHO's action plan to scale up services for mental, neurological and substance use disorders for countries especially with low and lower middle incomes. The aim of mhGAP is to build partnerships for collective action and to reinforce the commitment of governments, international organizations and other stakeholders.

The mhGAP Intervention Guide (mhGAP-IG) was launched in October 2010. It is a technical tool for the management of mental, neurological and substance use disorders in non-specialist health settings. The priority conditions included are: depression, psychosis, bipolar disorders, epilepsy, developmental and behavioural disorders in children and adolescents, dementia, alcohol use disorders, drug use disorders, self-harm/suicide and other significant emotional or medically unexplained complaints.

== Criticism ==
One of the most prominent critics of the Movement for Global Mental Health has been China Mills, author of the book Decolonizing Global Mental Health: The Psychiatrization of the Majority World.

Mills writes that:

This book charts the creeping of psychology and psychiatry across the borders of everyday experience and across geographical borders, as a form of colonialism that comes from within and from outside, swallowed in the form of a pill. It maps an anxious space where socio-economic crises come to be reconfigured as individual crisis – as 'mental illness'; and how potentially violent interventions come to be seen as 'essential' treatment.

Another prominent critic is Ethan Watters, author of Crazy Like Us: The Globalization of the American Psyche. A more constructive approach is offered by Vincenzo Di Nicola whose article on the Global South as an emergent epistemology creates a bridge between critiques of globalization and the initial gaps and limitations of the Global Mental Health movement.

A recent review presents a simple summary outlining the key characteristics of the global mental health landscape and indicating the diversity within the field. This review demonstrates how global mental health is not confined to the local-global debate, which has historically defined it.

== See also ==
- Global health
- Mental health during the COVID-19 pandemic
- Mental health first aid
- Parity of esteem
- World Mental Health Day
