= Mental health tribunal =

Tribunal hearing for mental health treatment disputes

A mental health tribunal is a specialist tribunal (hearing) empowered by law to adjudicate disputes about mental health treatment and detention, primarily by conducting independent reviews of patients diagnosed with mental disorders who are detained in psychiatric hospitals, or under outpatient commitment, and who may be subject to involuntary treatment.

The usual composition of the panel varies by jurisdiction but may consist of a legal member, a medical member and a community/specialist member. The legal member may be a senior lawyer or judge (often senior counsel) and acts as the chair; the medical member may be a senior (e.g. consultant) psychiatrist and has often held clinical responsibility for detained patients before; and the community/specialist/'non-legal' member is neither a lawyer or medical doctor but has relevant qualifications (often at postgraduate level) and/or specialist experience in mental health, either as a mental health professional or a specialist layperson.

Attendees may include the patient, a patient advocate, legal representatives (lawyers), any family (especially next of kin), and mental health professionals involved in the person's care (typically including the clinician with primary responsibility for the patient) or brought in for an independent view. The hearings may be held privately or may be open to the public, depending on the jurisdiction and individual circumstances.

Many Western developed nations use a tribunal model (they may be termed review boards) for mental health. There is usually provision to appeal decisions to a court (judicial review). By contrast some countries use an entirely judicial (courts) model, while some have no oversight or review body at all.

== International legal context ==
The World Health Organization observes that most countries around the world use some type of "independent authority such as a review body, tribunal or a court to confirm involuntary admission based on medical/psychiatric/professional expertise." Such authorities generally also adjudicate findings of incapacity to consent to or refuse medical treatment, and the issuing of community treatment orders (outpatient commitment) in countries that have them.

In countries that use the courts, although they have the advantage of unambiguous legal status, the court process can become a 'rubber stamp' exercise where judges make decisions in the absence of patients, representatives or witnesses, and endorse medical recommendations without independent analysis. Independent tribunals of specially selected members with expertise in the area are said to be more competent bodies if operated properly.

Many countries require that every person recommended for detention or involuntary treatment be reviewed in a legal hearing, with legal representation provided. Some countries with fewer resources may initially only require a paper review in straightforward cases, or may not review very short detentions (e.g. less than 72 hours). However, the WHO states that there must always be a right of appeal in a timely manner as well as "ongoing, automatic, mandatory and regular reviews of status." The hearing authority should not be influenced by any external instruction at all. A balance is required between avoiding delays in necessary admission/treatment, reviewing as soon as possible, preventing harm, and recognising rights to mental health care as well as to refuse treatment.

International legal agreements which can have a bearing on mental health tribunals include the Convention on the Rights of Persons with Disabilities (Article 13 Access to justice), the Universal Declaration of Human Rights or regional human rights conventions such as Article 5(4) (liberty and security of person) and Article 6 of the European Convention on Human Rights (right to a fair trial). However, tribunals are not necessarily legally enabled to deal with humans rights claims. In particular, claims for rights to mental health care and support still generally remain outside their remit, though they can sometimes make non-binding recommendations regarding care plans or supervisory arrangements.

The Principles for the Protection of Persons with Mental Illness ('MI Principles'), adopted by the United Nations General Assembly in 1991, has some basic standards concerning the need for a legal hearing for patients who are detained or treated against their will or whose capacity to make decisions is questioned. Principle 17 (Review body) includes 7 points. Point 1 states: "The review body shall be a judicial or other independent and impartial body established by domestic law and functioning in accordance with procedures laid down by domestic law. It shall, in formulating its decisions, have the assistance of one or more qualified and independent mental health practitioners and take their advice into account." The final point states: "A patient or his personal representative or any interested person shall have the right to appeal to a higher court against a decision that the patient be admitted to, or be retained in, a mental health facility."

== Decision-making ==
Evidence suggests that despite their multidisciplinary nature, tribunals are significantly influenced by the medical domain through the use of medical discourse and respect for medical expertise. Further, medical jargon can as barrier to patient autonomy as it can be difficult for individuals to express arguments in medical language. Concerns have been raised about the lack of scrutiny of medical evidence in Australia; carers in Scotland have criticised a "hierarchy of opinion" mirroring decision making in medical settings; and forensic patients in Canada commented on the influence of the treating teams and particularly psychiatrist in decision making.

== Experiences of individuals ==
Individuals involved in the tribunal process describe feelings of powerlessness and complain about the limited scope of tribunals that prevent them discussing their experience of treatment. Individuals may feel intimidated by the number of people present at the tribunal particularly if their friends and family members in attendance.

== Process ==
There have been issues in Ireland with of psychiatrists defying tribunals are readmitting patients after a tribunal revoked an order. Concerns regarding inaccurate and out-of-date medical reports have been raised in Canada. Risk is a component of decision making of tribunals but risk estimates are difficult. Individuals in New Zealand report disagreeing with risk assessments and felt that risk was exaggerated.

== By region ==
=== United Kingdom ===
==== England & Wales ====
The Mental Health Tribunal in England is now technically known as the First-tier Tribunal (Mental Health) but in practice is often called the Mental Health Tribunal. The First-tier Tribunal, created by the Tribunals, Courts and Enforcement Act 2007 (TCEA 2007) in 2008, is subdivided into chambers: Mental Health Tribunals come within the Health, Education and Social Care Chamber.

The Mental Health Review Tribunal for Wales was created by the Mental Health Act 1983 and has separate, but similar, procedural rules. John Geoffrey Jones, QC served as its chairman from 1996 to 1999.

A new Upper Tribunal was also created by the TCEA 2007. It hears appeals (and sometimes judicial reviews) relating to decisions of the First-tier Tribunal and MHRT for Wales. Appeals from the Upper Tribunal are heard by the Court of Appeal.

A tribunal panel has three members: the legal, medical and specialist lay member. Some patients held in the mental health system after facing criminal charges are termed 'restricted' patients and are subject to additional controls via the Secretary of State for Justice's Mental Health Casework Section, but are still reviewed by the Mental Health Tribunal (often led by a Circuit Judge). Three patients in the early 2010s were allowed to have their hearings in public, with the media in attendance.

==== Scotland ====
The Mental Health Tribunal for Scotland was created on 5 October 2005 by virtue of section 21 of the Mental Health (Care and Treatment) (Scotland) Act 2003.

==== Northern Ireland ====
The Mental Health Review Tribunal for Northern Ireland was set up under the Mental Health (Northern Ireland) Order 1986. Following the commencement of parts of the Mental Capacity Act (Northern Ireland) 2016, it was renamed as simply the Review Tribunal. It deals with cases of detention under the 1986 Order and of deprivation of liberty under the 2016 Act.

=== Ireland ===
Mental Health Tribunals in Ireland are administered by the Mental Health Tribunals Division of the Mental Health Commission. The related law is the Mental Health Act 2001. The Tribunal panel consists of a psychiatrist, a lawyer (either a solicitor or a barrister) and a lay member.

=== Other European countries ===
In many other jurisdictions, where mental health reviews are stipulated they tend to be carried out by a judge rather than by specialist tribunals. Turkey does not yet have a single coherent mental health law and there is no established system of review or appeal of detentions.

=== Australia ===
As it has a federal system of government, the tribunals vary by state in Australia. Examples include the Mental Health Review Tribunal of New South Wales and the Mental Health Review Tribunal (NT) (Northern Territories).

=== New Zealand ===
In New Zealand there is a right to apply for a review in a family court prior to applying for a Mental Health Review Tribunal. Rarely a hearing at the High Court is possible. The related legislation is the Mental Health (Compulsory Assessment & Treatment) Act 1992 (and Amendment Act 1999 of the same name).

=== Canada ===
As Canada has a federal system of government, Mental Health Review Boards are specific to each province or territory in Canada. For example, British Columbia's operates under its Mental Health Act. Ontario has instead a Consent and Capacity Board which operates under the Mental Health Act as well as the Health Care Consent Act, the Substitute Decisions Act and other legislation. The tribunals are also subject to the constitutional rights of Section 7 of the Canadian Charter of Rights and Freedoms. Appeals may rarely reach the Supreme Court of Canada. In addition, each province and territory has a separate Review Board (Criminal Code), established under the Criminal Code, which adjudicates mentally disordered offenders found unfit to stand trial or not criminally responsible by reason of mental disorder.

=== Republic of South Africa ===
South Africa has Mental Health Review Boards in each province, as mandated by the country's Mental Health Care Act 2002. Although the Act has been noted for improving aspects of the mental health system, the review boards "contend with limited resources, administrative challenges and limited political support."

=== Japan ===
Japan has regional Psychiatric Review Boards, but their independence is questioned. The members are appointed by the governor of each region, who is the same person who orders involuntary detentions. Half or over half of each panel is made up of psychiatrists, who are often owners of the hospitals, and only one legal member. Furthermore, there is no right of appeal to a higher judicial court or to legal representation.

=== Other ===
The United States uses a purely judicial model, rather than mental health tribunals ('mental health boards' in the US are regional government groups that monitor or advise on policy etc.). Civil commitment hearings are generally held before a judge, and operate under the laws of that state.

India has traditionally had no oversight body, even since the 1987 Mental Health Act. However a Draft Mental Health Care Bill (2012) looks to set up a national Mental Health Review Commission and state Mental Health Review Boards.

Mental health in China has traditionally had no oversight body or national mental health law. The Mental Health Care Act 2012 creates some rights for detained patients to request a second opinion from another state psychiatrist and then an independent psychiatrist; however there is no right to a legal hearing and no guarantee of legal representation.

== See also ==
- Mental health court
- Therapeutic jurisprudence
