= Ravenstruther Rail Terminal =

Freight handling facility near Ravenstruther, Scotland

Coordinates: 55.6881°N 3.7076°W

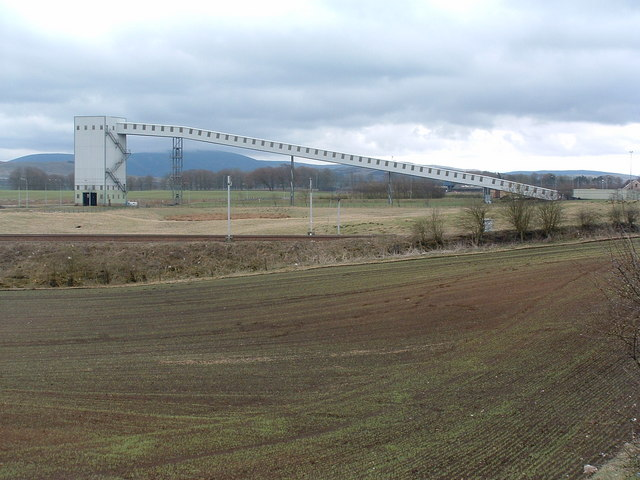
The site in 2006

Ravenstruther Rail Terminal is a freight handling facility near Ravenstruther in Scotland.

== History ==
The terminal was formerly operated by Scottish Coal. The coal loading facilities have since been demolished.

In 2020, the site was leased by owner Hargreaves Land to Cloburn Quarry Company. In October 2021, Cloburn acquired the site outright.

== Protests ==
During operation, the terminal was the site of regular protests.
