= Age of Majority (Scotland) Act 1969 =

Act of the Parliament of the United Kingdom

Age of Majority (Scotland) Act 1969 (Note: Section 2(1).)
- Act of Parliament
- Parliament of the United Kingdom
- Long title: An Act to amend the law of Scotland relating to the age of majority; and for connected purposes.
- Citation: 1969 c. 39
- Territorial extent: Scotland (Note: Section 2(4).)

Dates
- Royal assent: 25 July 1969
- Commencement: 1 January 1970 (Note: Section 2(3). The Age of Majority (Scotland) Act 1969 (Commencement) Order 1969 (SI 1969/1243).)

Other legislation
- Amends: Hypnotism Act 1952
- Amended by: Finance Act 1969; Prescription and Limitation (Scotland) Act 1973; Friendly Societies Act 1974; Customs and Excise Management Act 1979; Representation of the People Act 1983; Mental Health (Scotland) Act 1984; Statute Law (Repeals) Act 1993; Co-operative and Community Benefit Societies Act 2014
- Relates to: Family Law Reform Act 1969

Status: Amended

Text of statute as originally enacted

Revised text of statute as amended

Text of the Age of Majority (Scotland) Act 1969 as in force today (including any amendments) within the United Kingdom, from legislation.gov.uk.

The Age of Majority (Scotland) Act 1969 (c. 39) is an act of the Parliament of the United Kingdom applicable only in Scotland. The act reduced the age of legal majority from the age of 21 (or in some cases 25), to the age of 18.

The act affects any other act, prior or after this act, referring to the terms "major", "majority", "full age", "perfect age", "complete age", "lawful age", "minor", "minority", "under age", "less age". The Act also amends the age of majority for most deeds executed after the date of the Act, with exceptions for deeds created before the act created in exercise of a special power of appointment.

The act is distinct from the Age of Legal Capacity (Scotland) Act 1991, which governs the legal capacity of minors, including when they can enter into contracts.

== See also ==
- Age of majority
- Capacity in Scots law
- Age of Legal Capacity (Scotland) Act 1991
