= Mental Health Review Tribunal (England and Wales) =

In England, the First-tier Tribunal (Mental Health), more commonly known as the Mental Health Tribunal, is an independent quasi-judicial body established to safeguard the rights of persons subject to the Mental Health Act 1983. It provides for consideration of appeals against the medical detention or forced treatment of a person who was deemed to be suffering from a mental disorder that was associated with a risk to the health or safety of that person or others.

Prior to an overhaul of the tribunal system in 2008, its functions were carried out by the Mental Health Review Tribunal, which was a standalone body. In 2008 the Mental Health Review Tribunal was formally abolished as a standalone body and merged with the Health and Social Care Chamber of the newly established First-tier Tribunal (FTT). A new Upper Tribunal was also created, which hears appeals against decisions by the FTT. In Wales, the corresponding body is the Mental Health Review Tribunal for Wales.

== Tribunal hearings ==
Mental Health Tribunals are independent judicial bodies that operate under the provisions of the Mental Health Act 1983 and the Tribunal Procedure (First-Tier Tribunal) (Health, Education And Social Care Chamber) Rules 2008. A Tribunal's main purpose is to review the case of a patient detained under the Mental Health Act and to direct the discharge of any patient for whom the statutory criteria for discharge have been satisfied. In some cases, the Tribunal also has the discretion to discharge a patient who does not meet the statutory criteria. Such cases usually involve making a balanced judgement on a number of serious issues such as the freedom of the individual, the protection of the public and the best interests of the patient.

=== Tribunal panel members ===
The Lord Chancellor makes appointments to the panels of members for each region. In the case of medical and specialist members, the Secretary of State for Health (for cases in England) or the Secretary of State for Wales is also consulted. The Regional Chairmen appoint the members who are to sit at a particular hearing and there must be a legal member, a medical member and a specialist member appointed for each Tribunal hearing to form a legal quorum. In the event that one or two members are not present, the third member can technically open the tribunal and then immediately adjourn the hearing until another two members are able to attend. Any decisions formed by the tribunal are that of the tribunal, rather than the particular judicial member. There will be no dissenting judgment.

==== Role of the legal member (Tribunal Judge) ====
The legal member's role is to preside (i.e. take the chair) at all tribunal hearings. Their title is Tribunal Judge and they will prepare all decisions, documents, recommendations and judgments, on behalf of the whole tribunal. His or her responsibilities also include making sure that the proceedings are conducted fairly, that the legal requirements of the Mental Health Act 1983 are properly observed within the rule of law and advise on any questions of law which may arise. He or she is also responsible for drafting the reasons for the decision (written reasons are required in all cases). Tribunal Judges are required to have "such legal experience, as the Lord Chancellor considers suitable" and are judicial office holders appointed by the Judicial Appointments Commission. They are normally senior legal practitioners such as solicitors or barristers, but in 'restricted patient panel' (RPP) cases (also known as forensic cases) the level must be that of a Circuit Judge or higher. The majority of Tribunal judges are Fee-paid judges (namely those who practise full time as a barrister or solicitor and have a part time judicial appointment). In addition there are a small number of full time Tribunal Judges ("District Tribunal Judge") who are based in London (at the Royal Courts of Justice) and in Manchester. Their mode of address (in writing and during the hearing) is "Judge".

==== Role of the specialist member (Specialist Member) ====
The specialist member undertakes a check and balance role to the Tribunal under the Tribunal Rules. He or she will be a professional outside the legal and medical profession, but might hold legal or healthcare qualifications. Most specialist members are senior or experienced practitioners or therapists with at least 5–7 years standing and will hold a range of experience within the mental health sector. Most specialist members are educated to postgraduate level in mental health, they may hold an advanced degree in psychology or forensics in RPP cases. The specialist member will have extensive background knowledge of professional practice within the mental health field, health and/or social services. Members can be drawn from the NHS, voluntary organisations, adult social services or the private health sector. Specialist members may also be mental health social workers, probation officers, approved mental health professionals, psychologists, mental health nurses and occupational therapists. He or she will be able to offer information to the other members of the Tribunal on matters relating to health and social care matters and often healthcare legal matters in context (i.e. Codes of Practice, best practice etc.). Generally, specialist members are appointed in office for a term of 5 years and this is reviewed every 5 years until the age of 70.

==== Role of the medical member (Medical Member) ====
The medical member has a dual role to perform. They are required by the Tribunal Rules to carry out an examination of the patient before the hearing and to take any steps that they consider necessary to form an opinion of the patient's mental condition. In England, the pre-medical examination is not a requirement to hear a case. At the hearing they, together with the other members of the Tribunal, have the responsibility of deciding whether or not the patient should continue to be detained or remain on a community treatment order. If the medical member's opinion of the patient differs significantly from other medical witnesses then this should be made known at the beginning of the hearing. This is because it would be unfair and contrary to a basic principle of natural justice if the Tribunal members were to take notice of information that had not been shared with all the other parties at the hearing. The medical member is invariably a consultant psychiatrist of several years' standing. He or she will be able to advise the other members of the Tribunal on any medical matters. Medical members are generally senior doctors, with at least 7 years experience and are often drawn in from Consultant level. Generally, medical members are appointed in office for a term of 5 years and this is reviewed every 5 years until the age of 70.

=== Course of the tribunal ===
Tribunals sit in private. Prior to the Covid -19 pandemic the hearings would take place in the hospital or community unit where the patient is detained. During the pandemic video hearings were used exclusively. Post pandemic, video hearings are used for many hearings but patients and their legal representatives are able to seek a face to face hearing. The Tribunal is also able to list the hearing face to face if appropriate. Physical location aside, the tribunals resemble court hearings, during which appropriate witnesses are invited to speak in turn. These include the detained person, his or her solicitor, the member of the multi-disciplinary team responsible for the detained person's care in hospital, known as the Responsible Clinician or RC (usually a consultant psychiatrist), a representative of the nursing staff at the hospital and the Approved Mental Health Professional (AMHP). Additionally, the RC and AMHP (or more frequently the patient's care coordinator) are required to submit written reports on the person's state of health to the Tribunal in advance of the hearing. If the detained person is an in patient the nurse will also submit a written report.

=== How the decision is made ===
Each member of the Tribunal is entitled to an equal voice on questions of law, procedure and substance. All the members participate in the making of decisions and, although the Judge is expected to draft the written reasons for the decision, this is done only after taking into account the contributions of the other members. If the members do not all agree then a decision of the majority of members of the Tribunal is taken as the decision of the Tribunal.

The Tribunal will consider the case and the patient as presented on the day. The Tribunal cannot question the circumstances that gave rise to the detention. The Tribunal decides whether or not to end the patient's detention in hospital. The parties are told of the decision at the conclusion of the hearing (following the panel taking time to consider the submissions and evidence). In all cases the Judge will provide detailed written reasons which set out the background, evidence, and the Tribunal's findings and conclusion.

The Tribunal has the power to order a deferred discharge which may be conditional (for example that an aftercare package is put in place).

Decisions of the Tribunal can be appealed to the Administrative Appeals Chamber of the Upper Tribunal, or to the High Court, by way of Judicial Review.

== Organisation and oversight ==
=== The bodies ===
Technically the First-tier Tribunal (Mental Health) consists of two distinct elements, within a single non-departmental public body.

The first element is Judicial part of the Tribunal with the responsibility for hearing applications or references concerning people detained under the Mental Health Act 1983. The Judicial Tribunal members are appointed by the Ministry of Justice. There is a Liaison Judge appointed to the Tribunal to lead its development.

The second element is the Tribunal Secretariat. This is staffed by civil servants from His Majesty's Courts and Tribunals Service, and has responsibility for the administration of the Tribunals.

=== Judicial Management ===
The Mental Health Tribunal is part of the First Tier Tribunal (Health Education and Social Care) which is led by the President of the First-tier Tribunal (Health, Education and Social Care Chamber) who appoints a Deputy President. The Deputy President's responsibilities include appointing members to particular hearings, ensuring that all the statutory requirements are complied with, making judicial decisions and giving such directions as are necessary to ensure the speedy and just determination of every case. Full time Tribunal Judges are appointed as training judges responsible for organising training for members, for overseeing the members' appraisal and mentoring scheme and for handling complaints about a member's conduct.

=== Organisation of the Tribunal ===
The Minister of State for Courts and Legal Services is responsible for meeting the expenses of Tribunals in England and for providing accommodation and staff. Administration is carried out at the Secretariat offices in Leicester. The Welsh Assembly has similar responsibilities for Tribunals in Wales and administration is carried out at the Secretariat office in Cardiff. All the Secretariat staff are civil servants and are completely independent of the hospital authorities. The Regional Chairmen and the Secretariat work closely together to make sure that the whole Tribunal process is closely managed. The role of the Home Office is confined to cases involving 'restricted patients'.

Tribunals operate independently of all Government Departments.

== Fairness of decisions ==
A study in 2017, looked at the correlation between a number of predictors and the outcome of the decisions of the First-tier Tribunal (Mental Health): The study commented that their "findings imply that decisions are not biased in terms of age, sex, ethnicity, mental health diagnosis, or even index offence", rather its findings "suggest that by reducing levels of agitated behaviour, verbal aggression and physical violence on the ward, working towards being granted unescorted community leave, and specifically targeting items on the HCR-20 risk assessment" patients can increase their chance of discharge.

== See also ==
- Mental Health Tribunal
- Mental Health Tribunal for Scotland

== Sources ==
- Mental Health Law Online: Mental Health Tribunal Retrieved July 2013.
