= Carstairs Castle =

- Carstairs, South Lanarkshire in Scotland

Location
- Location within South Lanarkshire
- Coordinates: 55°41′52″N 3°41′19″W

Site history
- Fate: destroyed

Carstairs Castle was a stronghold in the east of Carstairs, a short distance from the current site of Carstairs Parish Church. Now long gone, it dates back to at least 1126 when it was given as a gift to the Bishops of Glasgow. In 1302, at the height of the Scottish Wars of Independence, Cartairs Castle had a garrison of seventy troops made up of ten men at arms, twenty named soldiers and forty footmen, which was greater than most local castles indicating that this was of strategic importance - Lanark Castle, by comparison, had a garrison of around 15 men at the time. The castle is believed to occupy the site of a much earlier Roman fortification.
