= Carstairs =

Coordinates: 55.695967°N 3.691175°W

Carstairs: Scottish Gaelic: Caisteal Tarrais
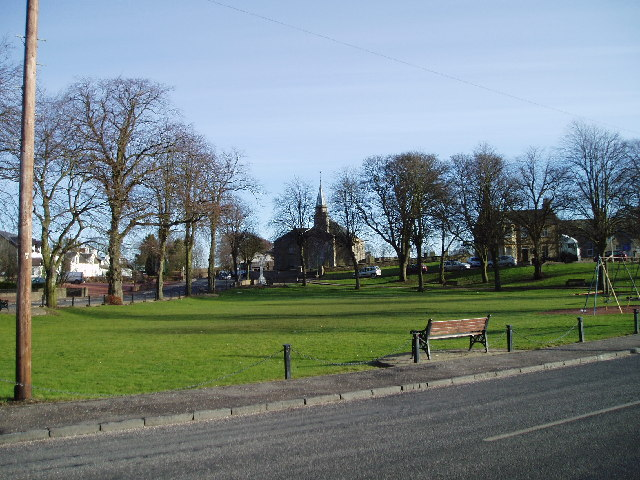
- Carstairs Village Green

- Location within South Lanarkshire
- Population: 840 (2020)
- OS grid reference: NS938460
- Community council: Carstairs
- Council area: South Lanarkshire
- Lieutenancy area: Lanarkshire
- Country: Scotland
- Sovereign state: United Kingdom
- Post town: LANARK
- Postcode district: ML11
- Dialling code: 01555
- Police: Scotland
- Fire: Scottish
- Ambulance: Scottish
- UK Parliament: Dumfriesshire, Clydesdale and Tweeddale
- Scottish Parliament: Clydesdale

Carstairs (/kɑːrˈstɛərz/, Scottish Gaelic: Caisteal Tarrais) is a village in South Lanarkshire, Scotland, located 5 miles (8 kilometres) east of the county town of Lanark. The West Coast Main Line provides service to Carstairs railway station, which is served by the Caledonian Sleeper, ScotRail and TransPennine Express services. Carstairs is best known as the location of the State Hospital. The name Carstairs is applied to the places Carstairs Village and the village of Carstairs Junction where the railway station is situated. The two places are completely different villages divided by 1 mile (1.5 kilometres) of land, a parkland area (Monteith Park) and the railway line.

Carstairs Village has massively expanded since 2007 with the building of Millwood Estate.

== Etymology ==
The name Carstairs is Brittonic in origin. The first part of the name is the element cajr, of which the primary sense is "an enclosed, defensible site" (Welsh caer; compare Cardiff). The second part of the name is a lost stream-name, identical in origin to the Tarras Water in Dumfriesshire, derived from the Brittonic root *tā, "melting, thawing, dissolving", suffixed with -ar an adjectival suffix common in river-names, plus -s, the Scots plural.

== History ==
A Roman fort was built at Castledyke in the first and second century AD. A later military castle occupied the site from at least the 12th century, known as Carstairs Castle. It has since been lost, but some underground remains have been found. A parish school was opened in 1619, and by 1754 William Roy recorded a sizeable farming village on the Lanark road to Carnwath and Edinburgh. Carstairs was made a burgh of barony in 1765. The mansion of Carstairs House was built in 1821–24 for Henry Montheith. 1848 saw the building of a railway station by the Caledonian Railway. By 1895 there was an inn and post office at the village.

During the 1920s, the Ministry of Labour acquired Lampits Farm, Carstairs Junction, for use as a labour camp. By 1938 there were 35 so-called "Instructional Centres", with a capacity of over 6,000. Their role was to 'harden' young unemployed men and prepare them for work elsewhere. Lampits Farm was originally intended in 1929 to train young men in farm and forestry work, with a view to their emigrating to Canada or Australia; it became an Instructional Centre a year later. Many of the Carstairs inmates came from coal-mining and other industrial backgrounds in the West of Scotland. The Ministry of Labour sold the site in 1935, and it reverted to use as a farm. In its last months, the Ministry of Labour used the inmates to help the Scottish Office Prison Department to build a new secure hospital.

Carstairs has gained a certain notoriety as the location of the State Hospital, a maximum-security psychiatric facility where some of Scotland and Northern Ireland's most severe cases of mental illness are treated. Many of the patients have been convicted of serious offences and some are incarcerated at the facility indefinitely.

== Transport ==
The main road running through Carstairs is the A70 road. Carstairs is served by bus route 37 and 137, operated by Stuart's Coaches of Carluke.

Carstairs is served by Carstairs railway station on the West Coast Main Line and Carstairs is also the location of a major junction on the WCML where the Edinburgh branch diverges.
