= Age of Legal Capacity (Scotland) Act 1991 =

Act of the Parliament of the United Kingdom

Age of Legal Capacity (Scotland) Act 1991 (Note: Section 11(1).)
- Act of Parliament
- Parliament of the United Kingdom
- Long title: An Act to make provision in the law of Scotland as to the legal capacity of persons under the age of 16 years to enter into transactions, as to the setting aside and ratification by the court of transactions entered into by such persons and as to guardians of persons under the age of 16 years; to make provision in the law of Scotland relating to the time and date at which a person shall be taken to attain a particular age; and for connected purposes.
- Citation: 1991 c. 50
- Territorial extent: Scotland (Note: Section 11(3).)

Dates
- Royal assent: 25 July 1991
- Commencement: 25 September 1991 (Note: Section 11(2).)
Other legislation
Amends	Defence Act 1842; Lands Clauses Consolidation (Scotland) Act 1845; Judicial Factors Act 1849; Improvement of Land Act 1864; Titles to Land Consolidation (Scotland) Act 1868; Colonial Stock Act 1877; Judicial Factors (Scotland) Act 1880; Judicial Factors (Scotland) Act 1889; Betting and Loans (Infants) Act 1892; Heritable Securities (Scotland) Act 1894; Heritable Securities (Scotland) Act 1894; Trusts (Scotland) Act 1921; Conveyancing (Scotland) Act 1924; Administration of Justice (Scotland) Act 1933; Agricultural Holdings (Scotland) Act 1949; Trusts (Scotland) Act 1961; Succession (Scotland) Act 1964; Registration of Births, Deaths and Marriages (Scotland) Act 1965; National Loans Act 1968; Social Work (Scotland) Act 1968; Taxes Management Act 1970; Sheriff Courts (Scotland) Act 1971; Guardianship Act 1973; Consumer Credit Act 1974; Rehabilitation of Offenders Act 1974; Finance (No. 2) Act 1975; Children Act 1975; Adoption (Scotland) Act 1978; Sale of Goods Act 1979; Matrimonial Homes (Family Protection) (Scotland) Act 1981; Insurance Companies Act 1982; Civil Jurisdiction and Judgments Act 1982; Child Abduction Act 1984; Companies Act 1985; Family Law (Scotland) Act 1985; Law Reform (Parent and Child) (Scotland) Act 1986; Disabled Persons (Services, Consultation and Representation) Act 1986; Family Law Act 1986; Income and Corporation Taxes Act 1988
Repeals/revokes	Tutors Act 1474; Tutors and Curators Act 1672; Oaths of Minors Act 1681; Tutors and Curators Act 1696
Amended by	Children (Scotland) Act 1995; Family Law (Scotland) Act 2006; Registration Services (Consequential Provisions) (Scotland) Order 2006; Adoption and Children (Scotland) Act 2007; Human Fertilisation and Embryology Act 2008; Finance Act 2012
Relates to	Prescription and Limitation (Scotland) Act 1973

Status: Amended

Text of statute as originally enacted

Revised text of statute as amended

Text of the Age of Legal Capacity (Scotland) Act 1991 as in force today (including any amendments) within the United Kingdom, from legislation.gov.uk.

The Age of Legal Capacity (Scotland) Act 1991 (c. 50) is an act of the Parliament of the United Kingdom applicable only in Scotland. It replaced the pre-existing rule of pupillage and minority with a simpler rule that a person has full legal capacity at the age of 16.

== Background ==
Under the previous Scots law (derived from Roman law), a child to the age of 12 if female, or 14 if male, had legal status of "pupil" and was under legal control of an adult (usually parent or parents) deemed "tutor". From that age until the age of majority the child had legal status of a "minor", and might have a responsible adult deemed "curator" or have no responsible adult (being referred to as "fors familiated"). The Scottish age of majority was originally 21 until reduced to 18 by the Age of Majority (Scotland) Act 1969. Pupils lacked any capacity to enter into legal contracts. Minors had capacity to enter into contracts, which included the capacity to make a will, but subject to rights to have these reduced by a court in certain circumstances, and sometimes requiring their curators consent. The rules as to when contracts did or did not require consent, and which were potentially reducible by court were complex. The age to enter into marriage was originally the age of minority, but this was raised to 16 years by the Age of Marriage Act 1929, and confirmed in the Marriage (Scotland) Act 1977.

== Act ==
The Age of Legal Capacity (Scotland) Act 1991 (c. 50) Act of the Parliament of the United Kingdom is applicable only in Scotland. It replaced the pre-existing rule of pupillage and minority with a simpler rule that a person has full legal capacity at the age of 16. Under the Age Legal Capacity Scotland Act 1991 the old rules and terms were replaced. The basic rule under the replacement regime is that under 16s have no legal capacity. This is qualified by section 2 which provides that under 16s can:

1. enter into a contract of a kind commonly entered into by persons of their age group, and on terms which are not unreasonable;
2. from age 12, make a Will, and are deemed to have capacity to instruct a lawyer to act on their behalf.

The right to consent to an adoption was also subsequently inserted into this section by the Children (Scotland) Act 1995.

In all other cases the legal Guardian of the under 16 has legal right to deal with all contractual and consent matters on the child's behalf.

From age 16 a person has full legal capacity to enter into any form of agreement. This subject to protection for younger persons by means of a right (under section 3) while under the age of 21, to have a contract made between the ages of 16 and 18 set aside as a "prejudicial transaction". The test is whether a reasonably prudent adult would not have entered into such a contract, and the person has been prejudiced by entering into that contract. Under section 4 a contract may be approved in advance by a court, in which case it cannot later be reduced. Contracts entered into in the course of the young person's business, or where they misrepresented their age also cannot be reduced.

There is also specific provision for persons having their birthday on 29 February; under section 6 they are treated as having their birthday on 1 March in every non-leap year for purposes of calculating their age.

== See also ==
- Age of majority
- Age of Majority (Scotland) Act 1969
- Capacity in Scots law
- Suitable age and discretion
