= List of acts of the Scottish Parliament from 1999 =

This is a list of acts of the Scottish Parliament passed in 1999. Acts of the Scottish Parliament are enacted by the Scottish Parliament, which has legislative authority over devolved matters in relation to Scotland under the authority of the Scotland Act 1998. Acts are cited by calendar year, in the same fashion as acts of Parliament of the United Kingdom. Each act passed in a respective year is numbered consecutively with Arabic numerals, following the prefix "asp".

1 act of the Scottish Parliament was passed in 1999.

indicates that an act has been transcribed on Wikisource, indicates that an act is available to view at legislation.gov.uk, and indicates the location of the original act in the Parliamentary Archives.

== Act of the Scottish Parliament ==
Short title	Citation	Royal assent
Long title
Mental Health (Public Safety and Appeals) (Scotland) Act 1999	1999 asp 1	13 September 1999
An Act of the Scottish Parliament to add public safety to the grounds for not discharging certain patients detained under the Mental Health (Scotland) Act 1984; (Note: Mental Health (Scotland) Act 1984 (c. 36)) to provide for appeal against the decision of the sheriff on applications by these patients for their discharge; and to amend the definition of "mental disorder" in that Act.

== See also ==
- List of acts of the Scottish Parliament
