= Parity of esteem =

Equal value of mental and physical health care

In health care, establishing parity of esteem means assigning equal value to mental health care and to physical health care.

In many healthcare systems, parity of esteem is unrealized because of the pervasive stigma of mental illness. People with diagnosed mental illness die on average around 20 years earlier than those without such a diagnosis, some because of suicide, but mostly because of poorly treated physical illness. Mental illness has been assessed as constituting around a quarter of the disease burden in developed countries. There is much bigger treatment gap for mental illness than for physical illness.

In the USA legislation was enacted in 2006 which attempted to achieve equality in health insurance coverage between surgical treatment and mental health treatments.

In the UK, Norman Lamb campaigned for mental health to be given parity of esteem with physical health. The Royal College of Psychiatrists proposed that parity of esteem should be defined as "Valuing mental health equally with physical health". In practice most arguments have been centred on levels of funding. Expenditure on mental health services provided by NHS trusts fell by around 8.25% between 2010 and 2015. According to Dr Phil Moore, chair of the Mental Health Commissioners Network at NHS Clinical Commissioners, discussions in 2016 had degenerated into a funding dispute. He wanted to see discussions about the degree to which mental health is embedded into other services, including the integration of psychological services with general practice

It has also been raised as an issue when comparing pay and conditions in healthcare with social care, where pay is generally much lower.
