= Defence Act 1842 =

Act of the Parliament of the United Kingdom

Defence Act 1842 (Note: The citation of this act by this short title was authorised by section 1 of, and the first schedule to, the Short Titles Act 1896. Due to the repeal of those provisions it is now authorised by section 19(2) of the Interpretation Act 1978.)
- Act of Parliament
- Parliament of the United Kingdom
- Long title: An Act to consolidate and amend the Laws relating to the Services of the Ordnance Department, and the vesting and Purchase of Lands and Hereditaments for those Services, and for the Defence and Security of the Realm.
- Citation: 5 & 6 Vict. c. 94
- Territorial extent: United Kingdom

Dates
- Royal assent: 10 August 1842
- Commencement: 10 August 1842 (Note: The Acts of Parliament (Commencement) Act 1793.)
Other legislation
Amends	See § Repealed enactments
Repeals/revokes	See § Repealed enactments
Amended by	Queen’s Remembrancer Act 1859; Defence Act 1860; Defence Act Amendment Act 1864; Statute Law Revision Act 1874 (No. 2); Statute Law Revision (No. 2) Act 1888; Statute Law Revision (No. 2) Act 1890; Mental Treatment Act (Northern Ireland) 1932; Defence (Barracks) Act 1935; Crown Proceedings Act 1947; Mental Health Act (Northern Ireland) 1948; Northern Ireland (Crown Proceedings) Order 1949; Crown Estate Act 1961; Administration of Justice Act 1965; Statute Law (Repeals) Act 1969; Statute Law (Repeals) Act 1973; Statute Law Revision (Northern Ireland) Act 1976; Judicature (Northern Ireland) Act 1978; Mental Health (Northern Ireland) Order 1986; Age of Legal Capacity (Scotland) Act 1991; Statute Law (Repeals) Act 1993; Local Government (Wales) Act 1994; Adults with Incapacity (Scotland) Act 2000; Courts Act 2003; Restricted Byways (Application and Consequential Amendment of Provisions) Regulations 2006; Justice Act (Northern Ireland) 2015; Housing and Planning Act 2016

Status: Partially repealed

Text of statute as originally enacted

Revised text of statute as amended

Text of the Defence Act 1842 as in force today (including any amendments) within the United Kingdom, from legislation.gov.uk.

The Defence Act 1842 (5 & 6 Vict. c. 94) is an act of the Parliament of the United Kingdom that consolidated enactments relating to the services of the Ordnance Department and the vesting and purchase of lands and hereditaments for those services and for the defence and security of the United Kingdom.

== Provisions ==
=== Repealed enactments ===
Section 1 of the act repealed 4 enactments, listed in that section.

Enactments repealed by section 1
Citation	Short title	Description	Extent of repeal
44 Geo. 3. c. 95	Defence of the Realm Act 1804	An Act to amend certain of the Provisions of an Act made in the Forty-third Year of His present Majesty, to enable His Majesty to provide for the Defence and Security of the Realm, which respect the Purchase of Lands and Hereditaments for the public Service.	The whole act.
1 & 2 Geo. 4. c. 69	Ordnance (Vesting of Estates) Act 1821	An Act for vesting all Estates and Property occupied for the Ordnance Service in the principal Officers of the Ordnance, and for granting certain Powers to the said principal Officers.	The whole act.
3 Geo. 4. c. 108	Ordnance (Barrack Service) Act 1822	An Act for vesting all Estates and Property occupied for the Barrack Service in any Part of the United Kingdom in the principal Officers of His Majesty's Ordnance, and for granting certain Powers to the said principal Officers in relation thereto.	The whole act.
2 & 3 Will. 4. c. 25	Ordnance (Estates) Act 1832	An Act to extend and render more effectual Two Acts, of the First and Second and Third Years of His late Majesty King George the Fourth, respecting the Estates thereby vested in the principal Officers of the Ordnance, and to facilitate the public Business in the Ordnance Department.	The whole act.

== Subsequent developments ==
The following provisions were repealed by section 1 of, and part III of the schedule to, the Statute Law (Repeals) Act 1969, which came into force on 1 January 1970.

- Section 8.
- In section 10, the words " feoffees or ", the words from " tenants for life " to " curators or ", the words from " femes covert" to " idiots or", the word " surrender", the words " enfranchisements, surrenders " and the words from " and shall be a complete bar " onwards.
- In sections 12, 13 and 14 the word " surrender " where-ever occurring, and in section 14 the word " surrendered ".
- In section 15 the words from " or being femes covert" to " for that purpose ", and the word " discovert".
- In section 18 the words " feoffees or ", the words from " tenants for life " to " curators or ", the words from " femes covert" to " idiots or", the word " surrender " and the word " surrenders ".
- In section 25 the words " enfranchisement of any copyhold or ".

In sections 10 and 18 of the act, the words from " femes covert " to " 1960, or " were repealed for Scotland by section 1(1) of, and part IX of schedule 1 to, the Statute Law (Repeals) Act 1973, which came into force on 18 July 1973.
