= Hypnotism Act 1952 =

Act of the Parliament of the United Kingdom

Hypnotism Act 1952 (Note: Section 7(1).)
- Act of Parliament
- Parliament of the United Kingdom
- Long title: An Act to regulate the demonstration of hypnotic phenomena for purposes of public entertainment.
- Citation: 15 & 16 Geo. 6 & 1 Eliz. 2. c. 46
- Territorial extent: England and Wales; Scotland; (Note: Section 7(2).)

Dates
- Royal assent: 1 August 1952
- Commencement: 1 April 1953 (Note: Section 7(3).)

Other legislation
- Amended by: Theatres Act 1968; Age of Majority (Scotland) Act 1969; Family Law Reform Act 1969; Local Government (Miscellaneous Provisions) Act 1982; London Local Authorities Act 1994; Licensing Act 2003; Protection of Freedoms Act 2012

Status: Amended

Text of statute as originally enacted

Revised text of statute as amended

Text of the Hypnotism Act 1952 as in force today (including any amendments) within the United Kingdom, from legislation.gov.uk.

The Hypnotism Act 1952 (15 & 16 Geo. 6 & 1 Eliz. 2. c. 46) is an act of the Parliament of the United Kingdom.

The act regulates stage hypnosis ("exhibition, demonstration or performance of hypnotism" for public entertainment).

== Provisions ==
The act has three primary parts – provisions applying to England and Wales, to Scotland, and to Great Britain as a whole.

=== England and Wales ===
In England and Wales, the act disallows the performance of hypnosis in a public place, unless given permission by the local authority, or they may be liable to a fine not exceeding level 3 on the standard scale, currently £1000.

=== Scotland ===
In Scotland, the act gives the authority to any local authority to provide licences to theatres to allow the performance of hypnosis at that location.

=== UK (excluding Northern Ireland) ===
In the UK (excluding NI), the act prohibits hypnosis being knowingly performed on those under 18 (originally 21) or be subject to a level 3 fine. The act also allows for any police officer to enter a location where "entertainment is held" if the officer has cause to believe this act is being contravened.

The act continues to allow for hypnosis to be used without a license if it is being used for research purposes (e.g. for the treatment of a mental or physical disease).

== Application ==
In 2024 the Metropolitan Borough of Bolton agreed to a request from a comedy hypnotist to overturn a policy it had introduced in the 1980s of refusing the permission required under the 1952 act. The Guardian's report on the matter said that most other councils had in previous decades either stopped enforcing the act or given perfunctory approval as a matter of course.
