= Ravenstruther =

Hamlet in Scotland, United Kingdom

Coordinates: 55°41′15″N 3°42′51″W

Ravenstruther: Scots: Raenstrie
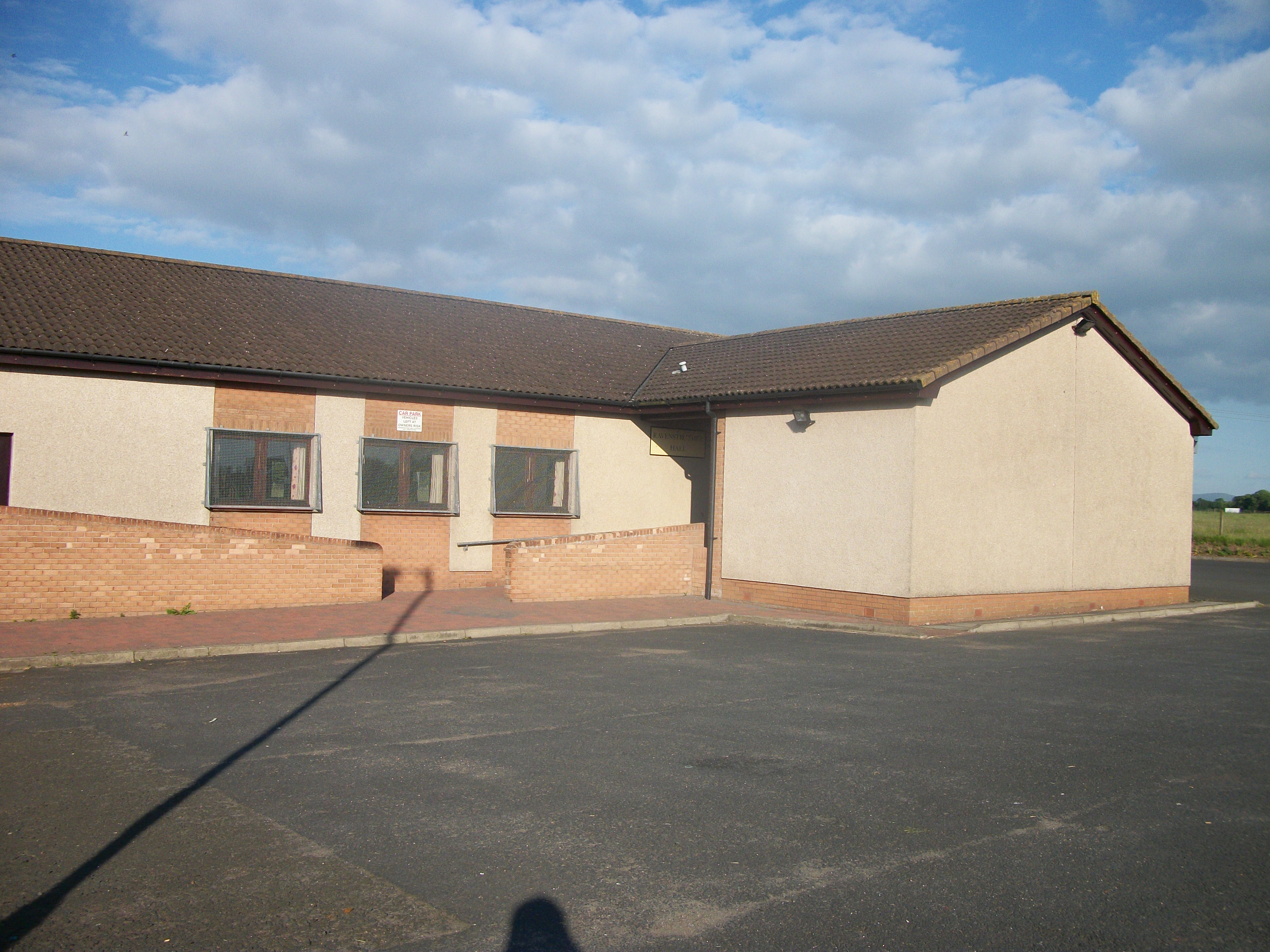
- Ravenstruther Hall

- Location within South Lanarkshire
- OS grid reference: NS921450
  - Edinburgh: 30 miles (48 km)
  - London: 390 miles (630 km)
- Council area: South Lanarkshire
- Lieutenancy area: Lanarkshire
- Country: Scotland
- Sovereign state: United Kingdom
- Post town: LANARK
- Postcode district: ML11
- Dialling code: 01555
- Police: Scotland
- Fire: Scottish
- Ambulance: Scottish
- UK Parliament: Lanark and Hamilton East
- Scottish Parliament: Clydesdale

Ravenstruther (/ˈrɛnstri/ REN-stree; Scots: Raenstrie) is a small hamlet in South Lanarkshire, Scotland, near the town of Lanark. In 1517 the lands of Carstairs and Ravenstruther were granted to William Sommerville. Ravenstruther was then known as Ronstruther. The village is home to a caravan and camping park.
