= Tarras Water =

River in the United Kingdom

Tarras Water is a river in Dumfries and Galloway, Scotland.

R.H. Traquair named a fossil of an extinct, prehistoric ray-finned fish Tarrasius problematicus after the Tarras Water. The name has subsequently been applied to the genus Tarrasiidae and the order Tarrasiiformes.

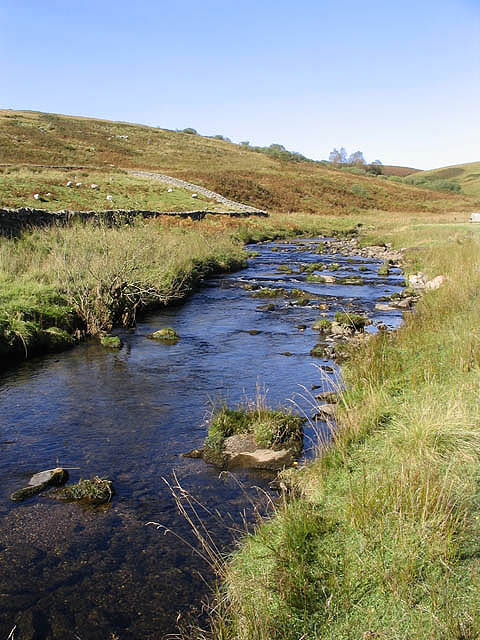
The Tarras Water

== Etymology ==
The name Tarras is of Brittonic origin. It is derived from the elements *tā-, with a root sense of "melting, thawing, dissolving" (Latin tābeō, "melt") and -ar, an adjectival suffix frequently occurring in river-names (Welsh -ar), with the Scots plural -s.

== Course ==
The Tarras Water rises to the west of Roan Fell, near the boundary with the Scottish Borders. It flows over 11 miles (17 km) south to join the River Esk 2 miles (3 km) south of Langholm opposite Auchenrivock.

== Poetry ==
Tarras Water was a nature poem by Wilfrid Wilson Gibson.
