= Capacity in Scots law =

Ability of an individual to transact with others

Legal capacity is the ability of an individual to transact with others. It should be distinguished from consent, where the individual with capacity, agrees for another to commit an act involving the consenter, such as consent to sexual relations under the Sexual Offences (Scotland) Act 2009.

== Rights Capacity ==
All persons, human and juristic, have rights capacity, i.e.: the ability to hold a right. This derives from the classification of the law of persons found in Roman law.

The word 'person' is usually taken to mean humans. However, in Scots law and in many other jurisdictions, the term is also used to describe corporate entities such as companies, or partnerships, Scottish Charitable Incorporate Organisation (SCIO) or other bodies corporate established by law (such as a government agency or local authority).

Organisations and associations must have the rights capacity to own property in their own right in order to act as a transferor (the person transferring ownership) or transferee (the person receiving ownership) in a voluntary transfer of land. It is necessary to check their respective articles of association, constitutions or founding legislation in order to ascertain whether the transferor and/or transferee has rights capacity in order to legally own land in Scotland.

If the transferee in a voluntary transfer is an unincorporated association, which there is no definition in Scots law but is generally interpreted as "a group of persons bound together by agreement for a particular purpose." Without a corporate body, the association has no legal person status in Scots law and as such when unincorporated associations transact to obtain ownership of the land, all the members of the association instead will own the property jointly in trust rather than ownership of the land vesting in solely in the association itself.

== Transactional Capacity (Capacity to Contract) ==
=== Children ===
Children (persons under the age of 16) do not have capacity to enter into a transaction. Instead the law provides that those with parental rights and responsibilities under the Children (Scotland) Act 1995, Part I can act on a child's behalf. This means that parents or a legal guardian appointed by the courts can transact on a child's behalf. However children are still granted a range of exceptions under section 2 of the Age of Legal Capacity (Scotland) Act 1991 including:

1. A person under the age of 16 years shall have legal capacity to enter into a transaction of a kind commonly entered into by persons of his age and circumstances, an on not unreasonable terms.
2. A child over 12 years may make a will or testamentary writing.
3. A child over 12 can consent to the making of an adoption order in relation to them.
4. A child under 16 can consent to any surgical, medical or dental procedure or treatment where, in the opinion of a qualified medical practitioner attending him, he is capable of understanding the nature and possible consequences of the procedure or treatment. This also includes the storage of gametes and the donation of cells for research.
5. A child under 16 shall have legal capacity to instruct a solicitor, in connection with any civil matter, where that person has a general understanding of what it means to do so. A child over 12 shall be presumed to be of sufficient age and maturity to have such understanding. A child who has capacity to instruct a solicitor also has the right to sue or be sued in the Scottish courts.

Any other transaction a child enters into is void, this means that contract is void ab initio (Latin: from the beginning) from the moment the child enters into the contract. Where a parent or guardian enters into a prejudicial transaction

=== Prejudicial Transactions Remedy for Young Adults (16-18 years old) ===
A person under the age of 21 may apply to the Sheriff court or Court of Session to have any previous prejudicial transactions set aside where the transaction was made by the applicant between the ages of 16 and 18. A prejudicial transaction is that:

"(a)an adult, exercising reasonable prudence, would not have entered into in the circumstances of the applicant at the time of entering into the transaction, and (b) has caused or is likely to cause substantial prejudice to the applicant"

An example of an application can be seen in X v British Broadcasting Corporation, where the applicant was successful in obtaining an interim interdict (in other jurisdiction this is termed an interim injunction) based on her "real prospect of success" in her action against the BBC that, among other things, that the agreement she had reached with the BBC to participate in a courtroom-documentary was a prejudicial transaction because she had been 17 at the time she had consented (transacted) while having dyslexia and struggling with substance abuse and did not consult a solicitor prior to entering into the agreement to participate.

=== Adults Generally ===
All adults over 16 years old have legal capacity under the Age of Legal Capacity (Scotland) Act 1991. However a human person's capacity to contract may be affected by the following:

==== Adults Without Capacity ====
In situations where an adult is infirm, elderly or has other learning/social difficulties, the adult's capacity to transact may be affected as a consequence and they may be considered incapax, now termed an adult with incapacity under the Adults with Incapacity (Scotland) Act 2000. The 2000 Act, one of the first Acts of the new Scottish Parliament, followed on from the Scottish Law Commission's report critical of the contemporary law in 1990. The test for capacity is found in Section 1(6) of the 2000 Act:

"Section 1(6) of the Adults With Incapacity (Scotland) Act 2000:

"adult” means a person who has attained the age of 16 years;

“incapable” means incapable of—

(a) acting; or

(b) making decisions; or

(c) communicating decisions; or

(d) understanding decisions; or

(e) retaining the memory of decisions, as mentioned in any provision of this Act, by reason of mental disorder or of inability to communicate because of physical disability; but a person shall not fall within this definition by reason only of a lack or deficiency in a faculty of communication if that lack or deficiency can be made good by human or mechanical aid (whether of an interpretative nature or otherwise);

and “incapacity” shall be construed accordingly."

If an adult without capacity enters into a contract, the contract is void irrespective of whether the other party knew of the lack of capacity. Under the In its place, a person can act for another individual by means of three legal routes:

===== Power of Attorneys =====
[Section in Edit]

===== Intervention Orders =====
[Section in Edit]

===== Guardianship Orders =====
[Section in Edit]

=== Companies ===
Rights Capacity

Organisations and associations must have the rights capacity to own property in their own right in order to act as a transferor (the person transferring ownership) or transferee (the person receiving ownership) in a voluntary transfer of land. It is necessary to check their respective articles of association, constitutions or founding legislation in order to ascertain whether the transferor and/or transferee has rights capacity in order to legally own land in Scotland. Companies and partnerships, and other corporate bodies will usually have rights capacity based on the statute enabling their creation. However, it is a matter of academic debate whether partnerships are capable of owning corporeal heritable property (land) in its own right, or whether the partners hold the property jointly in trust on behalf the partnership.

If the transferee in a voluntary transfer is an unincorporated association, which there is no definition in Scots law but is generally interpreted as "a group of persons bound together by agreement for a particular purpose." Without a corporate body, the association has no legal person status in Scots law and as such when unincorporated associations transact to obtain ownership of the land, all the members of the association instead will own the property jointly in trust rather than ownership of the property vesting in solely in the association itself.

Transactional Capacity

Organisations and associations must have the transactional capacity to enter into contracts and transfer property in their own right in order to act as a transferor (the person transferring ownership) or transferee (the person receiving ownership) in a voluntary transfer of land. It is necessary to check their respective articles of association, constitutions or founding legislation in order to ascertain whether the transferor and/or transferee has rights capacity in order to legally own land in Scotland. Companies and partnerships, and other corporate bodies will usually have rights capacity based on the statute enabling their creation. However, it is a matter of academic debate whether partnerships are capable of owning corporeal heritable property (land) in its own right, or whether the partners hold the property jointly in trust on behalf the partnership. With transfers of land, an authorised officer of the company or other corporate organisation can act as an agent of the body corporate and sign any formal contracts under the Requirements of Writings (Scotland) Act 1995.

== Contractual Remedies Where Capacity Affected/Incapacitated ==
Void Contract

[Section in Edit]

=== Facility and Circumvention ===
[Section in Edit]
