= Carstairs Junction =

Village in South Lanarkshire, Scotland

Coordinates: 55.690990°N 3.669349°W

Carstairs Junction: Scottish Gaelic: Snaim Caisteal Tarrais
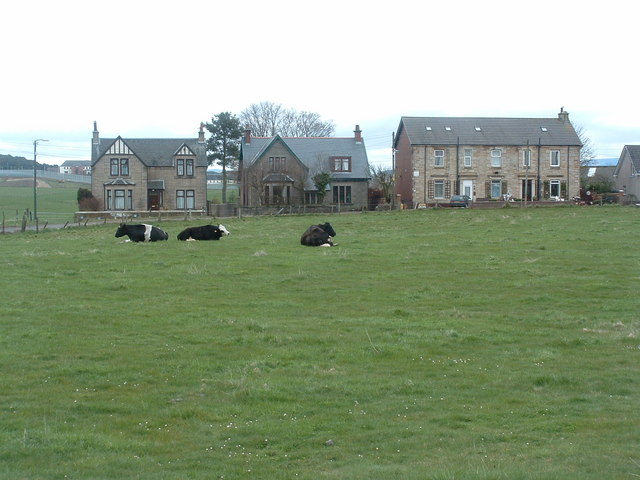
- Station Road, Carstairs Junction

- Location within South Lanarkshire
- Interactive map of Carstairs Junction
- Population: 670 (2020)
- OS grid reference: NS951454
  - Edinburgh: 29 miles (47 km)
  - London: 393 miles (632 km)
- Community council: Carstairs
- Council area: South Lanarkshire
- Lieutenancy area: Lanarkshire
- Country: Scotland
- Sovereign state: United Kingdom
- Post town: LANARK
- Postcode district: ML11
- Dialling code: 01555
- Police: Scotland
- Fire: Scottish
- Ambulance: Scottish
- UK Parliament: Lanark and Hamilton East
- Scottish Parliament: Clydesdale

Carstairs Junction (Scottish Gaelic: Snaim Caisteal Tarrais) is a village in South Lanarkshire. Taking its name from the village of Carstairs and nearby railway junction, the village grew around the railway station which opened in 1848. In 2011 it had a population of 747.

The village has a primary school, Carstairs Junction Primary School. A church, Pettinain Church, is Category B listed.
