= Mental Health Review Tribunal (NT) =

The Mental Health Review Tribunal is a specialist tribunal established in the Northern Territory of Australia, a territory of Australia which has jurisdiction to deal with mental health issues within its boundaries. It has exclusive jurisdiction in terms of most mental health issues, although it may share jurisdiction on some issue with other courts, such as the Supreme Court of the Northern Territory. The tribunal came into existence in 1998 and it is located on Level 3, 9–11 Cavenagh Street, Darwin.

== Constitution ==
The tribunal is established under the Mental Health & Related Services Act (NT). The act gives the tribunal a wide range of powers to deal with the treatment and care of people with a mental illness. The Administrator of the Northern Territory may appoint members to the tribunal. To be appointed, a person must be either:

- a legal practitioner who has not less than 5 years experience as a solicitor or barrister; or
- a medical practitioner; or
- a person who has a special interest or expertise in mental illness or mental disturbances.

From those members, the Administrator may appoint one to be the president of the tribunal. At present there is no permanent or full-time president of the tribunal. Most legal members are either current or retired stipendiary magistrates appointed in the territory. All medical members are interstate based psychiatrists who also undertake similar tribunal duties in their state. As a result, all sittings involve video or telephone conferencing.

== Functions of the tribunal ==
The tribunal is required to conduct period reviews of the admission and treatment of involuntary or voluntary patients into institutions. It also decides applications to administer non-standard treatments in respect of patients. It also hears appeals against decisions concerning admission or treatment and to review decisions to withhold information from patients. The tribunal may also make orders for the transfer of persons to treatment facilities in other Australian states or territories.

== Work of the tribunal ==
The Tribunal sits as a three-member panel. The legal member presides and decides any legal issues that may arise. The other members of the panel consist of the medical member and the community member.

The tribunal sits in Darwin and Alice Springs on a weekly basis. Tribunal hearings for remote locations may be held by video or telephone conferencing. Tribunal hearings usually take place on Wednesdays in Darwin and on Fridays in Alice Springs.

In 2006, the workload of the tribunal decreased from 208 in 2005 to 191 new patients.

== Appeals ==
In certain circumstances, there may be an appeal to the Supreme Court of the Northern Territory concerning the decisions of the tribunal.

== Sources ==
- Mental Health and Services Act (NT) – http://www.austlii.edu.au/au/legis/nt/consol_act/mharsa294/
- Annual Report 2005 – https://web.archive.org/web/20070930030739/http://www.nt.gov.au/justice/docs/depart/annualreports/mhrt_annrep_2006.pdf
- Homepage – https://web.archive.org/web/20070303072858/http://www.nt.gov.au/justice/graphpages/courts/mentalhealth/index.shtml
