= Mental Welfare Commission for Scotland =

Mental health and learning disability advocacy organizations

Mental Welfare Commission for Scotland logo

The Mental Welfare Commission for Scotland is a non-departmental public body, responsible for safeguarding the rights and welfare of people in Scotland with a learning disability, mental illness or other mental disorder. The commission was original established by the Mental Health (Scotland) Act 1960 (8 & 9 Eliz. 2. c. 61).

It enquires into cases of alleged ill treatment or deficiency of care or treatment, with investigations that include visits to alleged victims in hospitals and community settings.

The commission is accountable to the Scottish Government Health and Social Care Directorates for its statutory duties and how its public money is spent. It is required to follow NHS customary accounting rules and to meet NHS financial targets.

== Legal framework ==
It has statutory duties to safeguard the interests of people considered to be mentally disordered or incapacitated under the Mental Health (Care and Treatment) (Scotland) Act 2003 or the Adults with Incapacity (Scotland) Act 2000.

The Scottish Executive's introduction to the Act specifies:

"Part 2 of the 2003 Act sets out provisions relating to the continued existence of the Mental Welfare Commission for Scotland. The Commission will have:

- new duties to monitor the operation of the Act and to promote best practice;
- specific powers and duties in relation to carrying out visits to patients, investigations, interviews and medical examinations, and to inspect records; and
- powers and duties to publish information and guidance, and to give advice or bring matters to the attention of others in the mental health law system.

These powers and duties should enable the Commission to maintain and develop its vital role in protecting the rights of service users, and in promoting the effective operation of mental health law. Schedule 1 of the Act sets out more detail on the membership, organisation and general powers of the Commission and makes provision for regulations to specify some matters in more detail, if necessary."

The same act also set up the Mental Health Tribunal for Scotland, which hears appeals against detentions and applications for compulsory treatment orders under the 2003 act.

== Working with other organisations ==
The commission also works closely with several other organisations including the Office of the Public Guardian, Scottish Public Services Ombudsman (SPSO), Scottish Social Services Council (SSSC), Healthcare Improvement Scotland and the Care Inspectorate

== Location ==
The offices of the commission are based in Edinburgh. In 2005 the Scottish Executive had wanted the commission to relocate to Falkirk as part of a Scotland-wide approach to the location of government jobs. However, the Commission did not need to comply with the policy on the location of government jobs because it is an independent body.

== See also ==
- Mental health in the United Kingdom
