= Adults with Incapacity (Scotland) Act 2000 =

Act of the Scottish Parliament

Adults with Incapacity (Scotland) Act 2000 (Note: Section 89(1).)
- Act of the Scottish Parliament
- Scottish Parliament
- Long title: An Act of the Scottish Parliament to make provision as to the property, financial affairs and personal welfare of adults who are incapable by reason of mental disorder or inability to communicate; and for connected purposes.
- Citation: 2000 asp 4
- Introduced by: Jim Wallace
- Territorial extent: Scotland

Dates
- Royal assent: 9 May 2000
- Commencement: various (Note: Section 89(2)–(3).)
Other legislation
Amends	Defence Act 1842; Trusts (Scotland) Act 1921; Solicitors (Scotland) Act 1980; Law Reform (Miscellaneous Provisions) (Scotland) Act 1980; Law Reform (Miscellaneous Provisions) (Scotland) Act 1990; Social Security Administration Act 1992; Health Service Commissioners Act 1993; Criminal Procedure (Scotland) Act 1995
Repeals/revokes	Curators Act 1585
Amended by	Regulation of Care (Scotland) Act 2001; Mental Health (Care and Treatment) (Scotland) Act 2003; Smoking, Health and Social Care (Scotland) Act 2005; Human Tissue (Scotland) Act 2006; Adult Support and Protection (Scotland) Act 2007; Human Fertilisation and Embryology Act 2008; Land Registration etc. (Scotland) Act 2012; Human Tissue (Authorisation) (Scotland) Act 2019

Status: Amended

History of passage through the Parliament

Text of statute as originally enacted

Text of the Adults with Incapacity (Scotland) Act 2000 as in force today (including any amendments) within the United Kingdom, from legislation.gov.uk.

The Adults with Incapacity (Scotland) Act 2000 (asp 4) is an act of the Scottish Parliament. It was passed on 29 March 2000, receiving royal assent on 9 May. It concerns the welfare of adults (the age of legal capacity in Scotland being 16) who are unable to make decisions for themselves because they have a mental disorder or are not able to communicate. It provides the framework for other people (such as carers) to act on the behalf of people with incapacity.

The act was one of the first pieces of legislation passed by the Scottish Parliament upon it being reconvened in 1999.

== Provisions ==
The framework established by the act has three main principles:

- interventions in the life of an adult should be for the benefit of that adult
- the intervention should be minimally restrictive
- the adult’s wishes, both past and present, should be taken into account

The act largely modernised the legal framework in relation to incapacity.

=== Content ===
Part 2 of the act concerns power of attorney and provides the framework for an individual (whilst they have capacity) to appoint someone to act as their continuing (financial) or welfare attorney.

Part 3 of the act concerns the accounts and funds of the adult with incapacity. It enables access to the bank or building society account of the adult with incapacity, in order to pay their costs of living.

Part 4 of the act concerns the management of finances of adults with incapacity who are residents of registered establishments including health service or private hospitals, psychiatric hospitals, state hospitals and care home services.

Part 5 of the act concerns medical research and treatment of adults with incapacity. It allows, under certain circumstances, medical research to be carried out on adults unable to give consent.

Part 6 of the act concerns intervention orders and guardianship orders. An intervention order can be applied for by, or on behalf of, an adult with incapacity and granted by the sheriff court. It may cover welfare or financial matters. An application for a guardianship order may be made by individuals or by a local authority regarding an adult with incapacity who may have long-term needs.

Part 7 of the act ("Miscellaneous") makes it an offence for an individual to wilfully neglect an adult with incapacity.

== See also ==
- Mental Capacity Act 2005
- Capacity in Scots law

== Sources ==
Adults with Incapacity (Scotland) Act 2000: A Short Guide to the Act (PDF), The Scottish Government, 1 April 2008
