= Nigeria Mental Health Act =

Nigerian mental health care law

The Nigeria Mental Health Act is a Nigerian law that regulates the administration of mental health care in the country. The mental Health Act was created in 2023 by the President Muhammadu Buhari government and called the Nigeria Mental Health Act 2021.

== History ==
The Nigeria Mental Health Act replaced the Lunacy Ordinance of 1958.
