= Mental Health Tribunal for Scotland =

The Mental Health Tribunal for Scotland is a tribunal of the Scottish Government to hear applications for, and appeals against, Compulsory Treatment Order, and appeals against Short Term Detention Certificates made under the Mental Health (Care and Treatment) (Scotland) Act 2003, and other matters in relation to that Act, for example, appeals against Compulsion and Restriction Orders.

== History ==
The Mental Health Tribunal for Scotland was established on 5 October 2005, under the Mental Health (Care and Treatment) (Scotland) Act 2003.

Its headquarters are located in Hamilton, although it has staff who work throughout Scotland.

== Controversy ==
The Mental Health Tribunal has been criticised regarding its opacity and its authority. In 2009, WikiLeaks published a membership list which had previously been hosted on the Tribunal's website but later removed, along with several observations to this effect.

== See also ==
- Involuntary commitment
- Mental Health Tribunal § United Kingdom
- Gartnavel Royal Hospital
