= Mental Health (Care and Treatment) (Scotland) Act 2003 =

Act of the Scottish Parliament

Mental Health (Care and Treatment) (Scotland) Act 2003 (Note: Section 333(1).)
- Act of the Scottish Parliament
- Scottish Parliament
- Long title: An Act of the Scottish Parliament to restate and amend the law relating to mentally disordered persons; and for connected purposes.
- Citation: 2003 asp 13
- Introduced by: Malcolm Chisholm
- Territorial extent: Scotland

Dates
- Royal assent: 25 April 2003
- Commencement: various (Note: Section 333(2)–(4).)
Other legislation
Amends	24 acts: Local Government (Scotland) Act 1973; National Health Service (Scotland) Act 1978; Education (Scotland) Act 1980; Law Reform (Miscellaneous Provisions) (Scotland) Act 1985; Disabled Persons (Services, Consultation and Representation) Act 1986; Children Act 1989; National Health Service and Community Care Act 1990; Access to Health Records Act 1990; Further and Higher Education (Scotland) Act 1992; Prisoners and Criminal Proceedings (Scotland) Act 1993; State Hospitals (Scotland) Act 1994; Children (Scotland) Act 1995; Criminal Law (Consolidation) (Scotland) Act 1995; Criminal Procedure (Consequential Provisions) (Scotland) Act 1995; Criminal Procedure (Scotland) Act 1995; Mental Health (Patients in the Community) Act 1995; Crime (Sentences) Act 1997; Crime and Punishment (Scotland) Act 1997; Crime and Disorder Act 1998; Health Act 1999; Immigration and Asylum Act 1999; Adults with Incapacity (Scotland) Act 2000; Regulation of Care (Scotland) Act 2001; International Criminal Court (Scotland) Act 2001; Scottish Public Services Ombudsman Act 2002
Repeals/revokes	4 acts: Mental Health (Scotland) Act 1984; Mental Health (Detention) (Scotland) Act 1991; Mental Health (Public Safety and Appeals) (Scotland) Act 1999; Mental Health (Amendment) (Scotland) Act 1999
Amended by	Smoking, Health and Social Care (Scotland) Act 2005

Status: Amended

History of passage through the Parliament

Text of statute as originally enacted

Revised text of statute as amended

Text of the Mental Health (Care and Treatment) (Scotland) Act 2003 as in force today (including any amendments) within the United Kingdom, from legislation.gov.uk.

The Mental Health (Care and Treatment) (Scotland) Act 2003 (asp 13) is an act of the Scottish Parliament which was passed in March 2003, and came into effect on 5 October 2005. The act establishes that medical professionals can legally detain and treat people through short term detention on the grounds of exhibiting signs of mental disorders, with the Mental Health Tribunal for Scotland and the Mental Welfare Commission for Scotland providing safeguards against mistreatment on the grounds of maintaining non-discrimination practices. It received royal assent on 25 April 2003. It largely replaces the Mental Health (Scotland) Act 1984.

== Provisions ==
The act includes provisions to allow certain patients to be treated in the community rather than in hospital.

=== Detention certificates ===
The act allows medical professionals to issue short-term detention certificates and emergency detention certificates. Short-term certificates are referred to by the Act as the 'preferred gateway' to detention, and would lead to up to 28 days' detention. During this period, treatment may be administered against the will of the detainee, but it can also lead to compulsory treatment orders, which may have potentially long-term implications for the detainee. Detainees can apply to the Mental Health Tribunal for revocation of short-term certificates.

Emergency certificates lead to up to 72 hours' detention, and can also lead to detentions under short-term certificates. Emergency certificates do not enable treatment against the will of detainees, except for urgent treatment, and there is no formal process of appeal against them. Additionally, short-term detentions may be extended for periods of up to three working days, to facilitate applications to the Mental Health Tribunal for compulsory treatment orders. Saturdays, Sundays and Scottish bank holidays are not counted as working days.

Unless a certificate is completed for someone who is already in a mental health hospital, both forms of detention are preceded by detention of up to 72 hours in what are called 'places of safety', while transport to hospital is arranged.

=== Principles ===
The law is based on a set of principles. These principles should be taken into account by anyone involved in a person's care and treatment.

- Past and present wishes – Patients should be given the information and support they need to take part in decisions about their care and treatment. To help service users get their views across, the act puts in place the right to access independent advocacy services. It also puts in place advance statements as a way to help service users say what care and treatment they would and would not want to have. The Mental Health Commission in Scotland examines cases where a person's advance statement has been overridden.
- The views of any caretaker, guardian or welfare attorney – Caretakers should be involved in decision-making and should be given information they need to help them in their role. Concerns have been raised around the problem of patient confidentiality and sharing information, however the Scottish Mental Welfare Commission stated that solutions for the problem are being worked on.
- Options – A patient's care plan should reflect their needs as an individual. A Mental Health Tribunal reviews compulsory treatment orders that last longer than 2 years or in case the service user appeals a compulsory treatment order after three months.
- Providing care and treatment that will be of most benefit – A care plan should reflect the patient's safety, needs, and wishes. In addition, the Act puts in place safeguards when consent to treatment has not been given.
- Individual abilities and background – Important traits of the patient such as their age, gender, sexual orientation, religion, racial origin or membership of any ethnic group should be taken into account by people providing care and treatment.

People providing care should also make sure that:

- any restrictions on a person's freedom are the least necessary.
- the person being treated under the Act shouldn't be treated any less favorably than anyone else being treated for a mental illness, or other mental disorder.
- the carer's needs are taken into account.
- the person being treated is getting services that are right for them.
- when a person is no longer receiving compulsory treatment, they should still continue to get care and treatment if it is needed.
- if the person being treated is under 18, their welfare is of the highest priority.

=== Tribunal ===
The act established the Mental Health Tribunal, replacing the role of a sherif sitting alone.

== Reception ==
During the passage of the legislation, Shona Barcus of the Scottish Association for Mental Health described concerns to do with the legislation possibly leading to increased use of involuntary treatment.

== See also ==
- List of acts of the Scottish Parliament from 1999
- Mental Health (Public Safety and Appeals) (Scotland) Act 1999
