= Mental Health (Scotland) Act 1984 =

Act of the Parliament of the United Kingdom

Mental Health (Scotland) Act 1984 (Note: Section 130.)
- Act of Parliament
- Parliament of the United Kingdom
- Long title: An Act to consolidate the Mental Health (Scotland) Act 1960.
- Citation: 1984 c. 36
- Territorial extent: Scotland; England and Wales (in part) (Note: Section 128.); Northern Ireland (Note: Section 129.)

Dates
- Royal assent: 12 July 1984
- Commencement: 30 September 1984
Other legislation
| Amends | Colonial Prisoners Removal Act 1884; See § Repealed enactments |
| Repeals/revokes | See § Repealed enactments |
| Amended by | Law Reform (Miscellaneous Provisions) (Scotland) Act 1985; Health Service Commissioners Act 1993; Statute Law (Repeals) Act 1993; Employment Tribunals Act 1996; Employment Rights Act 1996; Crime and Disorder Act 1998; Immigration and Asylum Act 1999; Scottish Public Services Ombudsman Act 2002; Mental Health (Care and Treatment) (Scotland) Act 2003 |
| Relates to | Mental Health Act 1983 |

Status: Partially repealed

Text of statute as originally enacted

Revised text of statute as amended

Text of the Mental Health (Scotland) Act 1984 as in force today (including any amendments) within the United Kingdom, from legislation.gov.uk.

The Mental Health (Scotland) Act 1984 (c. 36) is an act of the Parliament of the United Kingdom covering Scotland, comparable to the Mental Health Act 1983 which covered England and Wales. It was superseded by the Mental Health (Care and Treatment) (Scotland) Act 2003.

== Provisions ==
The act required relatively little written averment of the case for compulsion Local authorities had certain legal obligations under the act.

=== Repealed enactments ===
Section 127(2) of the act repealed 22 enactments, listed in schedule 5 to the act.

Enactments repealed by section 127(2)
| Citation | Short title | Extent of repeal |
|---|---|---|
| 1960 c. 61 | Mental Health (Scotland) Act 1960 | The whole act. |
| 1961 c. 15 (N.I.) | Mental Health (Northern Ireland) Act 1961 | In Schedule 5, Part II. |
| 1963 c. 39 | Criminal Justice (Scotland) Act 1963 | In Schedule 5, the entry relating to the Mental Health (Scotland) Act 1960. |
| 1967 c. 28 | Superannuation (Miscellaneous Provisions) Act 1967 | Section 14. |
| 1968 c. 20 | Courts-Martial (Appeals) Act 1968 | In Schedule 4, the entry relating to the Mental Health (Scotland) Act 1960. |
| 1968 c. 46 | Health Services and Public Health Act 1968 | Section 75. |
| 1968 c. 49 | Social Work (Scotland) Act 1968 | In Schedule 8, paragraphs 50 to 59. |
| 1969 c. 39 | Age of Majority (Scotland) Act 1969 | In Schedule 1, Part I, the entry relating to the Mental Health (Scotland) Act 1960. |
| 1969 c. 54 | Children and Young Persons Act 1969 | In Schedule 5, paragraphs 42 and 43. |
| 1971 c. 77 | Immigration Act 1971 | Section 30. |
| 1972 c. 58 | National Health Service (Scotland) Act 1972 | Section 52(1). |
| 1972 c. 58 | National Health Service (Scotland) Act 1972 | In Schedule 6, paragraphs 105 to 117. |
| 1974 c. 46 | Friendly Societies Act 1974 | In Schedule 9, paragraph 17. |
| 1975 c. 21 | Criminal Procedure (Scotland) Act 1975 | In Schedule 9, paragraphs 17 to 29. |
| 1976 c. 67 | Sexual Offences (Scotland) Act 1976 | In Schedule 1, the entry relating to the Mental Health (Scotland) Act 1960. |
| 1976 c. 83 | Health Services Act 1976 | Section 19(3), (4)(c). |
| 1978 c. 29 | National Health Service (Scotland) Act 1978 | In Schedule 16, paragraphs 12 and 13. |
| 1980 c. 5 | Child Care Act 1980 | In Schedule 5, paragraphs 15 and 16. |
| 1980 c. 44 | Education (Scotland) Act 1980 | In Schedule 4, paragraph 2. |
| 1980 c. 62 | Criminal Justice (Scotland) Act 1980 | In section 80, subsection (4). |
| 1982 c. 51 | Mental Health (Amendment) Act 1982 | In Schedule 3 in Part I, paragraph 31. |
| 1983 c. 20 | Mental Health Act 1983 | In Schedule 4, paragraph 16. |
| 1983 c. 39 | Mental Health (Amendment) (Scotland) Act 1983 | The whole act. |

== Amendments ==
In December 1998, Sam Galbraith announced the establishment of a committee to review the act.

The whole act was repealed by section 331(2) of, and part 1 of schedule 5 to, the Mental Health (Care and Treatment) (Scotland) Act 2003, which came into force on 5 October 2005.

The repeal was amended to be the whole act, except section 10(1)(b) and (c) and (2) and section 95, by article 1 of, and schedule 1 to, the Mental Health (Care and Treatment) (Scotland) Act 2003 (Modification of Enactments) Order 2005 (SI 2005/465).
