= R v Burgess =

1991 English legal appeal

- Court: Court of Appeal (Criminal Division)
- Full case name: Regina v. Barry Douglas Burgess
- Decided: 27 March 1991
- Citations: 2 QB 92; WLR 1206; All ER 769; 93 Cr App R 41
- Cases cited: Reg v Kemp [1957] 1 Q.B. 399, 407 Bratty v Attorney-General for Northern Ireland [1963] AC 386; Rabey v The Queen [1980] 2 S.C.R. 513, 519, 520; R v Sullivan [1984] A.C. 156; R v Parks (1990) 56 C.C.C. (3d) 449 M'Naghten Rules (1843) 10 Cl. & Fin. 200
- Legislation cited: Trial of Lunatics Act 1883

Case history
- Prior actions: Insanity found (and thus not guilty of offence) at Bristol Crown Court, before Judge Sir Ian Lewis and a jury (not reported)
- Subsequent action: None

Court membership
- Judges sitting: Lord Lane CJ, Roch J and Morland J

Keywords
- sleepwalking; parasomnia; violence; internal, organic source; insanity

R v Burgess [1991] 2 QB 92 was an appeal in the Court of Appeal of England and Wales that adjudged sleepwalking entailing violence from an internal, organic cause amounts to insane automatism.

At first instance, Burgess was likewise found not guilty by reason of insanity as his case fell under the M'Naghten Rules; a finding that would entail a possible stigma and a treatment plan. His defense team appealed arguing such automatism was no form of 'insanity', but fell within the class of automatism such as a spiked drink which could show a complete lack of mens rea. The court ruled that violent sleepwalking with no external triggers was considered insane automatism. An appeal was dismissed.

== Background ==
On 2 June 1988, Barry Douglas Burgess attacked his friend, Katrina Curtis. She had fallen asleep on a sofa and woke up when Burgess, while allegedly sleepwalking, hit her over the head with a bottle. He subsequently picked up a video tape recorder and struck her on the head with it, giving her cuts and bruises. He put his hands around her throat. When she said, "I love you Bar", it appeared that he came to his senses and he called for an ambulance.

== Judgement ==
On 20 July 1989, the Crown Court found Burgess not guilty by reason of insanity on a charge of wounding with intent. He was ordered to be detained at a psychiatric hospital.

== Appeal ==
Under section 12 of the Criminal Appeal Act 1968, Burgess appealed the decision.

The defendant brought in forensic psychiatrist Dr. P.T. d’Orban, and neuropsychiatrist Dr. Peter Eames for medical evidence. The prosecution called in neuropsychiatrist Dr. Peter Fenwick, who contended that the incident was not run-of-the-mill sleepwalking, but perhaps a hysterical dissociative state.

The judge, Lord Lane said, "We accept of course that sleep is a normal condition, but the evidence in the instant case indicates that sleep walking, and particularly violence in sleep, is not normal."

It was found that the violent action was due to an internal, organic cause, rather than an external one. Thus, the appeal was dismissed.

== Implications ==
The sleepwalking in this case was violent and had a possibility of recurrence, so it could be considered a form of insanity.
