= R v Mkize =

South African legal case

In R v Mkize, a landmark case in South African criminal law, especially as it pertains to the defence of automatism, the accused was charged with the murder of his sister, whom he had stabbed to death. The court found, on a balance of probabilities, that he had suffered an attack known as "epileptic equivalent." He was therefore unconscious, without judgment or will or purpose or reasoning; the stabbing was a result of blind reflex activity. There was no intention to kill. The verdict, therefore, was "not guilty."

== See also ==
- Automatism (law)
- South African criminal law
