= Evidential burden =

Obligation to produce evidence to properly raise an issue at a court of law

Evidential burden or "production burden" is the obligation to produce evidence to properly raise an issue at trial. Failure to satisfy the evidential burden means that an issue cannot be raised at a court of law.

== Definition ==
Evidential burden has been described as the obligation "to show, if called upon to do so, that there is sufficient evidence to raise an issue as to the existence or non-existence of a fact in issue, due regard being had to the standard of proof demanded of the party under such obligation".

Lord Bingham said that evidential burden is not a burden of proof, but rather a burden of raising an issue as to the matter in question fit for consideration by the tribunal of fact. In the criminal law context, if an issue is properly raised, it is for the prosecutor to prove, beyond reasonable doubt, that that issue does not avail the defendant." In the United States, however, both the burden of production and the burden of persuasion are referred to as "burdens of proof."

An evidential burden compels a party to produce evidence in support of an issue it seeks to raise, failing which the party shall not be permitted to raise it at all. This burden can rest on either party, although it usually relates to matters of defence raised by the accused. Some defences impose an evidential burden on the defendant. If the evidential burden is met, the prosecution then bears the burden of proof (which is not called an evidential burden). For example, if a person charged with murder pleads self-defence, the defendant must satisfy the evidential burden that there is some evidence suggesting self-defence. The burden of proof then falls on the prosecution to produce evidence to support their position. In such a case, a legal burden will always rest on the prosecution to prove beyond reasonable doubt that the defendant was not acting in self-defence. A legal burden is determined by substantive law, rests upon one party and never shifts.

The satisfaction of the evidential burden has sometimes been described as "shifting the burden of proof", a label which has been criticized because the burden placed on a defendant is not the legal burden of proof resting on the prosecution.

To satisfy the burden, there must be evidence which both supported the issue and which is sufficiently substantial to raise a reasonable doubt as to the accused's guilt. Whether the burden is satisfied is a matter for the judge.

== Case example ==
In R v Acott, the defendant was charged with murdering his mother. He claimed his mother was injured in a fall, but the medical evidence demonstrated that the deceased died because of a sustained attack and was indicative of a possible loss of self-control from the defendant. The trial judge did not leave the issue of provocation to the jury, and the defendant was eventually convicted. The defendant's appeal to the Court of Appeal was dismissed and he appealed to the House of Lords, the issue being:

In a prosecution for murder, before the judge is obliged to leave the issue of provocation to the jury, must there be some evidence, either direct or inferential, as to what was either done or said to provoke the alleged loss of self-control?

The House of Lords held that in the absence of any evidence, emerging from whatever source, which suggested the reasonable possibility that the defendant might have lost his self-control due to provoking conduct, the question of provocation did not arise and should not be put to the jury. On the facts, there was no evidence of the nature of the provocation and the jury could not, therefore, determine the relevant conditions necessary for provocation. The appeal was therefore dismissed.

== Rationale ==
The reason for imposing an evidential burden is to ensure the prosecution does not have to disprove all imaginable defences, only those properly supported by sufficient evidence. Lord Morris of Borth-y-Gest said in Bratty v Attorney-General for Northern Ireland:

As human behaviour may manifest itself in infinite varieties of circumstances it is perilous to generalize, but it is not every facile mouthing of some easy phrase of excuse that can amount to an explanation. It is for a judge to decide whether there is evidence fit to be left to the jury which could be the basis of some suggested verdict...

== Human rights law ==
In 2002, the imposition of evidential burden on defendants in England and Wales was challenged as contrary to Article 6(2) of the European Convention on Human Rights (ECHR), which guarantees the right to a fair trial. The House of Lords held that a mere evidential burden was not contrary to the ECHR.

== See also ==
- Burden of proof (law)
