= Richard Rosner =

Richard Rosner may refer to:

- Richard Rosner (psychiatrist) (born c. 1941), American forensic psychiatrist
- Rick Rosner (born c. 1941), American television writer and producer, creator of CHiPs
- Richard G. Rosner (born 1960), American television writer, producer, and high-IQ celebrity
