= S v Chretien =

South African legal case

In S v Chretien, an important case in South African criminal law, especially as it pertains to the defence of automatism, the Appellate Division held that even automatism arising out of voluntary intoxication may constitute an absolute defence, leading to a total acquittal, where, inter alia, the accused drinks so much that they lack criminal capacity.

Seven years later, the legislature intervened to limit the destructive consequences of this decision, enacting section 1(1) of the Criminal Law Amendment Act, in "a vain attempt to reflect public sentiment on intoxication." In so doing, however, "the Legislature simply compounded the problems."

Modelled on the German penal code, this provision created the special statutory offence of committing a prohibited act while in a state of criminal incapacity induced by the voluntary consumption of alcohol. It requires the prosecution to prove, beyond a reasonable doubt, that the accused is not liable for a common-law offence because of the lack of capacity resulting from this self-induced intoxication, "so requiring the prosecution to engage in an unfamiliar volte face." As Burchell explains,

If the intoxication, leading to an acquittal of the common-law offence, is only sufficient to impair intention (as on the facts of Chretien), rather than sufficient to impair capacity, then no liability can result under s 1(1), as lack of capacity resulting from intoxication has to be proved for a conviction under s 1(1). The section is in dire need of reform or replacement with a more appropriately worded section.

== See also ==
- Automatism (law)
- South African criminal law
