= People v. Drew =

Californian court case

- Supreme Court of California

Decided September 26, 1978
- Full case name: The People, Plaintiff and Respondent, v. Ronald Jay Drew, Defendant and Appellant.
- Citation(s): 22 Cal. 3d 333; 583 P.2d 1318; 149 Cal. Rptr. 275

Holding
- The M'Naghten Rules do not adequately identify legal insanity. M'Naghten Rules discarded. Model Penal Code adopted.

Court membership
- Chief Justice: Rose Bird
- Associate Justices: Mathew Tobriner, Stanley Mosk, William P. Clark Jr., Frank K. Richardson, Wiley Manuel, Frank C. Newman

Case opinions
- Majority: Tobriner, joined by Bird, Newman, Mosk
- Concurrence: Mosk
- Dissent: Richardson, joined by Clark, Manuel
- Overruled by
- California Proposition 8 (1982)

People v. Drew, 22 Cal. 3d 333 (1978), was a case decided by the California Supreme Court that abandoned the M'Naghten Rules of the criminal insanity defense in favor of the formulation in the Model Penal Code. The decision was later abrogated by Proposition 8 in 1982, which restored the M'Naghten rules.
