= R v Sullivan =

- Court: House of Lords
- Full case name: R v Sullivan
- Citation: [1984] AC 156

Case opinions
- Lord Diplock

Keywords
- Insanity

R v Sullivan [1984] AC 156 is a British House of Lords case in criminal law, and a leading modern authority on the common law defence of insanity.

== Facts ==
The defendant, who had had epilepsy since childhood, kicked the victim, his friend, during an epileptic seizure while he was sitting in his neighbour's flat on 8 May 1981. Upon recovery, the defendant only remembered the incident where he was standing by a window with the victim lying on the floor with head injuries. The defendant was charged with assault. The trial judge ruled that the evidence that the defendant had had a post-epileptic seizure would amount to a disease of the mind, not that of automatism.

== Judgment ==
The House of Lords held that epilepsy was a disease of the mind due to the defendant's impaired mental faculties causing defect in reasoning. Lord Diplock stated that

"The evidence as to the pathology of a seizure due to psychomotor epilepsy can be sufficiently stated for the purposes of this appeal by saying that after the first stage, the prodram, which precedes the fit itself, there is a second stage, the ictus, lasting a few seconds, during which there are electrical discharges into the temporal lobes of the brain of the sufferer. The effect of these discharges is to cause him in the postictal stage to make movements which he is not conscious that he is making, including, and this was a characteristic of previous seizures which Mr. Sullivan had suffered, automatic movements of resistance to anyone trying to come to his aid. These movements of resistance might, though in practice they very rarely would, involve violence"

== See also ==
- Insanity defense
- M'Naghten rules
