= Edward Drummond =

British politician (1792–1843)

Edward Drummond (30 March 1792 – 25 January 1843) was a British civil servant, and was Personal Secretary to several British prime ministers. He was fatally shot by Daniel M'Naghten, whose subsequent trial gave rise to the M'Naghten rules, the legal test of insanity used in many common law jurisdictions.

== Life and career ==
Drummond was a member of the family who owned and ran Drummonds Bank, and a great-grandson of William Drummond, 4th Viscount Strathallan who died fighting for the Jacobite cause at the Battle of Culloden in 1746. His parents were Charles Drummond, a banker, and his wife, Frances Dorothy (herself the second daughter of the Reverend Edward Lockwood). He was one of nine children, of whom five survived to adulthood. His sister Charlotte did not marry and shared a house with him in Lower Grosvenor Street. His older brother Charles followed their father into the bank; younger brother Berkeley went into the army and younger brother Arthur into the church. Drummond joined the civil service in June 1814, becoming a clerk at the Treasury. He was later Private Secretary to a succession of British Prime Ministers: George Canning, Lord Goderich, the 1st Duke of Wellington, and Robert Peel.

== Assassination ==
On the afternoon of 20 January, Drummond was walking along Whitehall on his way back to Downing Street from visiting his brother at the bank in Charing Cross when Daniel McNaughton, a Scottish woodturner, approached him from behind, drew a pistol and fired at point-blank range into his back. McNaughton was overpowered by a police constable before he could fire a second pistol. It is generally thought, although the evidence is not conclusive, that McNaughton was under the impression that he had shot Prime Minister Robert Peel. At first it was thought that Drummond's wound was not serious. He managed to walk back to his house, the bullet was removed and the first newspaper reports were optimistic: "The ball has been extracted. No vital part is injured, and [surgeons] Mr Guthrie and Mr Bransby Cooper have every reason to believe that Mr. Drummond is doing very well." However, complications set in and Drummond died five days later, aged 50. He was buried at St Luke's Church, Charlton, where his brother Arthur was rector. Spencer Perceval, the prime minister who had been assassinated in 1812 (and whose sister Mary had been married to Drummond's uncle Andrew Berkeley Drummond), was also buried at Charlton, in the Egmont family vault.

Queen Victoria wrote in a letter to Leopold I of Belgium that "Poor Drummond is universally regretted". McNaughton was tried for murder, but found not guilty by reason of insanity and committed to Bethlem Hospital and later to Broadmoor Hospital. The McNaughton Rules developed by the House of Lords after his trial were to establish the basis for the insanity defence in all common law countries. In 1843, a surgeon who was opposed to blood-letting published an anonymous pamphlet claiming that Drummond was killed not by McNaughton's shot, but by the medical treatment he received afterwards. He said that a gunshot wound of the type sustained by Drummond was not necessarily fatal and criticised Drummond's doctors for their hasty removal of the bullet and repeated blood-lettings.

== In popular culture ==
Drummond features as a character in season 2 of the ITV television series Victoria. He is portrayed as being considerably younger than he was in the 1840s, and the year and circumstances of his assassination are significantly altered. He is also shown as having a relationship with Lord Alfred Paget, which is generally regarded as improbable. In the TV series, Drummond is killed instantly when he throws himself in front of an assassin's bullet to protect Peel immediately after the vote to repeal the Corn Laws.
