= Daniel M'Naghten =

British woodturner and criminal (1813–1865)

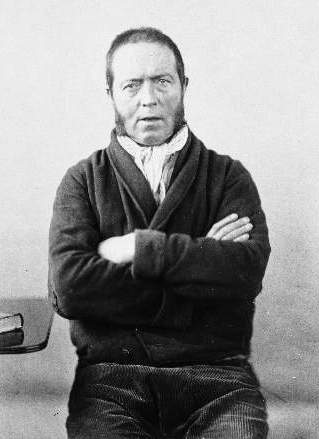
Daniel M'Naghten. Photographed by Henry Hering c 1856

Daniel M'Naghten (sometimes spelt McNaughtan or McNaughton; 1813 – 3 May 1865) was a Scottish woodturner who assassinated British civil servant Edward Drummond while suffering from delusions of persecution. Tried for murder, he was found not guilty on the ground of insanity and committed to Bethlem Hospital. Following his trial and its aftermath, his name was given to the legal test of criminal insanity in England and other common law jurisdictions known as the M'Naghten rules.

== Life ==
=== Name and spelling ===
There is disagreement over how M'Naghten's name should be spelt (Mc or M' at the beginning, au or a in the middle, a, e, o or u at the end). M'Naghten is favoured in both English and American law reports, although the original trial report used M'Naughton; Bethlem and Broadmoor records use McNaughton and McNaughten. In a 1981 book about the case, Richard Moran, Professor of Criminology at Mount Holyoke College, in Massachusetts, United States, uses the spelling McNaughtan, arguing that this was the family spelling.

Until 1981, there was only one known signature: that which M'Naghten affixed to a sworn statement given before the magistrate at Bow Street during his arraignment. This signature, preserved in the Metropolitan Police File at the Public Record Office in Chancery Lane, London, first came to the attention of legal scholars in 1956. According to an authority at the British Museum this signature was spelt McNaughtun. Since this spelling did not conform to any of those in popular use, it did not help to resolve the controversy.

Moran discovered a second signature during his research. On the front page of the Scotch Reformers Gazette, supplementary edition for 4 March 1843, there appeared an artist's sketch of Daniel M'Naghten standing in the dock at Old Bailey, accompanied by an engraving of his signature. This signature revealed that the apparent u in the Bow Street signature was actually an a. It also indicated that the apostrophe was used by printers to signify a small letter c placed above the line, since the Scotch Reformers Gazette, in the article accompanying the sketch and signature, used an inverted apostrophe to resemble more closely the letter c. The spelling "McNaughtan" was confirmed in the Glasgow Postal Directory for the years 1835 to 1844. While the Victorians were not always consistent in the way they spelt their names, even in official documents, several signatures of M'Naghten's father, uncovered while examining financial records at the Bank of Scotland, indicate that the "McNaughtan" spelling was the one used by the family.

=== Early life ===
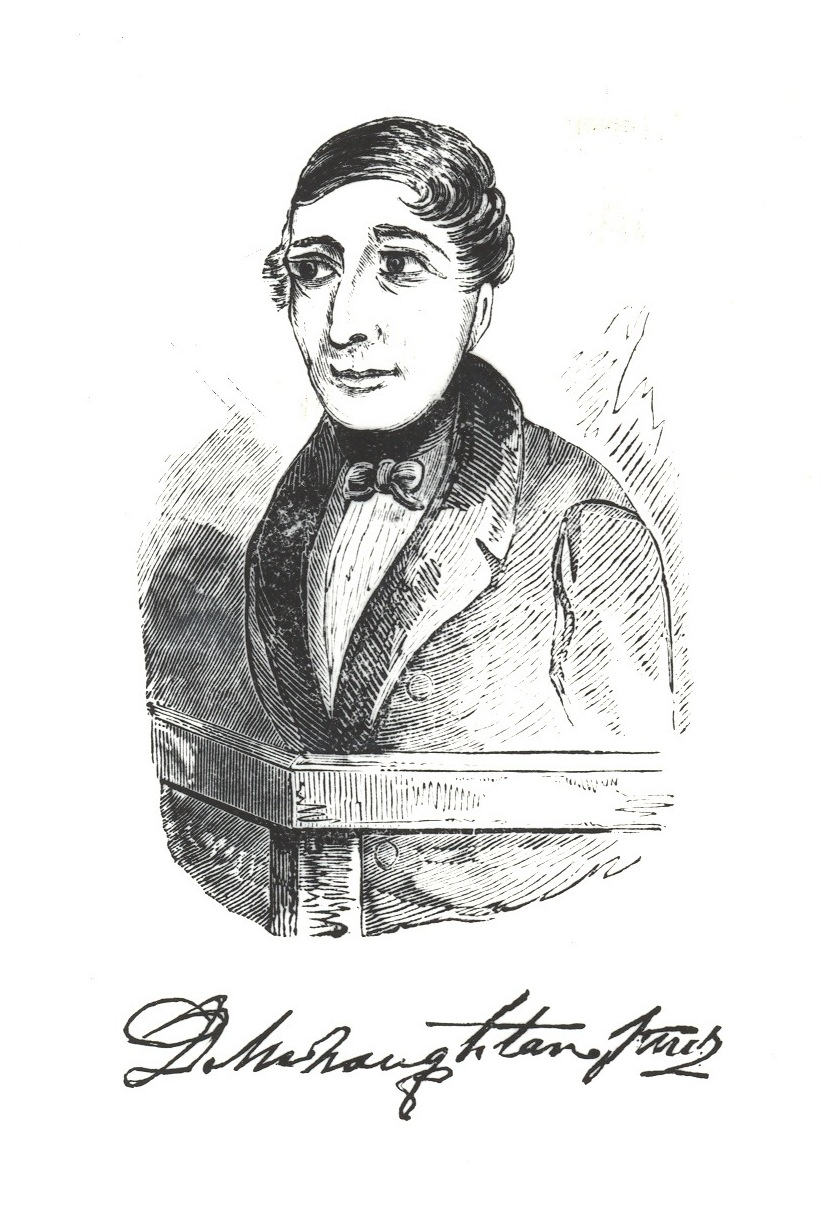
An 1843 artist's sketch of Daniel M'Naghten, and an engraving of his signature

Most of what is known about M'Naghten comes from evidence given at his trial and newspaper reports that appeared between his arrest and his trial. He was born in Scotland, probably Glasgow, in 1813, the illegitimate son of a Glasgow woodturner and landlord, also called Daniel M'Naghten. After the death of his mother Ada, M'Naghten went to live with his father's family and became an apprentice and later a journeyman at his father's workshop in Stockwell Street, Glasgow. When his father decided not to offer him a partnership, M'Naghten left the business and, after a three-year career as an actor, returned to Glasgow in 1835 to set up his own woodturning workshop.

For the next five years, he ran a successful woodturning business, first in Turners Court and then in Stockwell Street. He was sober and industrious, and by living frugally was able to save a considerable sum of money. In his spare time, he attended the Glasgow Mechanics' Institute and the Athenaeum Debating Society, walked, and read. He taught himself French so that he could read La Rochefoucauld. His political views were radical, and he employed the Chartist Abram Duncan in his workshop.

In December 1840, M'Naghten sold his business and spent the next two years in London and Glasgow, with a brief trip to France. In the summer of 1842, he attended lectures on anatomy in Glasgow, but otherwise, it is not known what he did with his time. Whilst in Glasgow in 1841, he complained to various people, including his father, the Glasgow commissioner of police, and an MP, that he was being persecuted by the Tories and followed by their spies. No one took him seriously, believing him to be deluded.

=== Murder of Edward Drummond ===
In January 1843, M'Naghten was noticed acting suspiciously around Whitehall in London. On the afternoon of 20 January, the Prime Minister's private secretary, civil servant Edward Drummond, was walking towards Downing Street from Charing Cross when M'Naghten approached him from behind, drew a pistol and fired at point-blank range into his back. M'Naghten was overpowered by a police constable before he could fire a second pistol. It is generally thought, although the evidence is not conclusive, that M'Naghten was under the impression that he had shot Prime Minister Robert Peel.

At first it was thought that Drummond's wound was not serious. He managed to walk away, the bullet was removed and the first newspaper reports were optimistic: "The ball has been extracted. No vital part is injured, and [surgeons] Mr Guthrie and Mr Bransby Cooper have every reason to believe that Mr Drummond is doing very well." But complications set in and, possibly because of the surgeons' bleeding and leeching, Drummond died five days later.

M'Naghten appeared at the Bow Street magistrates' court the morning after the assassination attempt. He made a brief statement in which he described how persecution by the Tories had driven him to act: "The Tories in my native city have compelled me to do this. They follow, persecute me wherever I go, and have entirely destroyed my peace of mind... It can be proved by evidence. That is all I have to say." It was indeed all he had to say. He never spoke about the assassination again (apart from a dozen words when asked to plead guilty or not guilty at arraignment).

=== Trial ===
When M'Naghten was arrested, a bank receipt for £750, equivalent to £82,389 in 2025, was found on him. His father successfully applied to the court to have the money released to finance his defence, and for the case to be adjourned for evidence relating to M'Naghten's state of mind to be gathered. A date was set for Friday 3 March. It has been suggested that the speed and efficiency with which M'Naghten's defence was organised shows that a number of powerful people in law and medicine were waiting for an opportunity to bring about changes in the law on criminal insanity.

M'Naghten's trial for the "wilful murder of Mr Drummond" took place at the Central Criminal Court, Old Bailey, Thursday and Friday, 2–3 March 1843, before Chief Justice Tindal, Justice Williams and Justice Coleridge. When asked to plead guilty or not guilty, M'Naghten said "I was driven to desperation by persecution," but when pressed added, "I am guilty of firing", which was taken as a not guilty plea. M'Naghten's defence team was led by one of London's best-known barristers, Alexander Cockburn. The case was prosecuted by the solicitor-general, Sir William Follett, as the attorney-general was busy in Lancaster prosecuting Feargus O'Connor and 57 other Chartists following the plug riots.

Both prosecution and defence based their cases on what should, or what did, constitute a legal defence of insanity. Both sides agreed that M'Naghten suffered from delusions of persecution. The prosecution argued that, in spite of his "partial insanity", he was a responsible agent, capable of distinguishing right from wrong, and conscious that he was committing a crime. Witnesses, including his landlady and his anatomy lecturer, were produced to testify that he appeared generally sane.

Cockburn opened his defence by acknowledging that there were difficulties in the practical application of the principle of English law that held an insane person exempt from legal responsibility and legal punishment. He went on to say that M'Naghten's delusions had led to a breakdown of moral sense and loss of self-control, which, according to medical experts, had left him in a state where he was no longer a "reasonable and responsible being". He quoted extensively from Scottish jurist Baron Hume and American psychiatrist Isaac Ray. Witnesses were produced from Glasgow to give evidence about M'Naghten's odd behaviour and complaints of persecution. The defence then called medical witnesses, including Edward Monro, Sir Alexander Morison and Forbes Winslow, who testified that M'Naghten's delusions had deprived him of "all restraint over his actions".

When the prosecution declined to produce any medical witnesses to counter this evidence, the trial was halted. Follet then made a brief, apologetic closing speech which he concluded with the words "I cannot press for a verdict against the prisoner". Chief Justice Tindal, in his summing up, stressed that the medical evidence was all on one side and reminded the jury that if they found the prisoner not guilty on the ground of insanity, proper care would be taken of him. The jury, without retiring, duly returned a verdict of not guilty on the ground of insanity.

=== Bethlem and Broadmoor ===
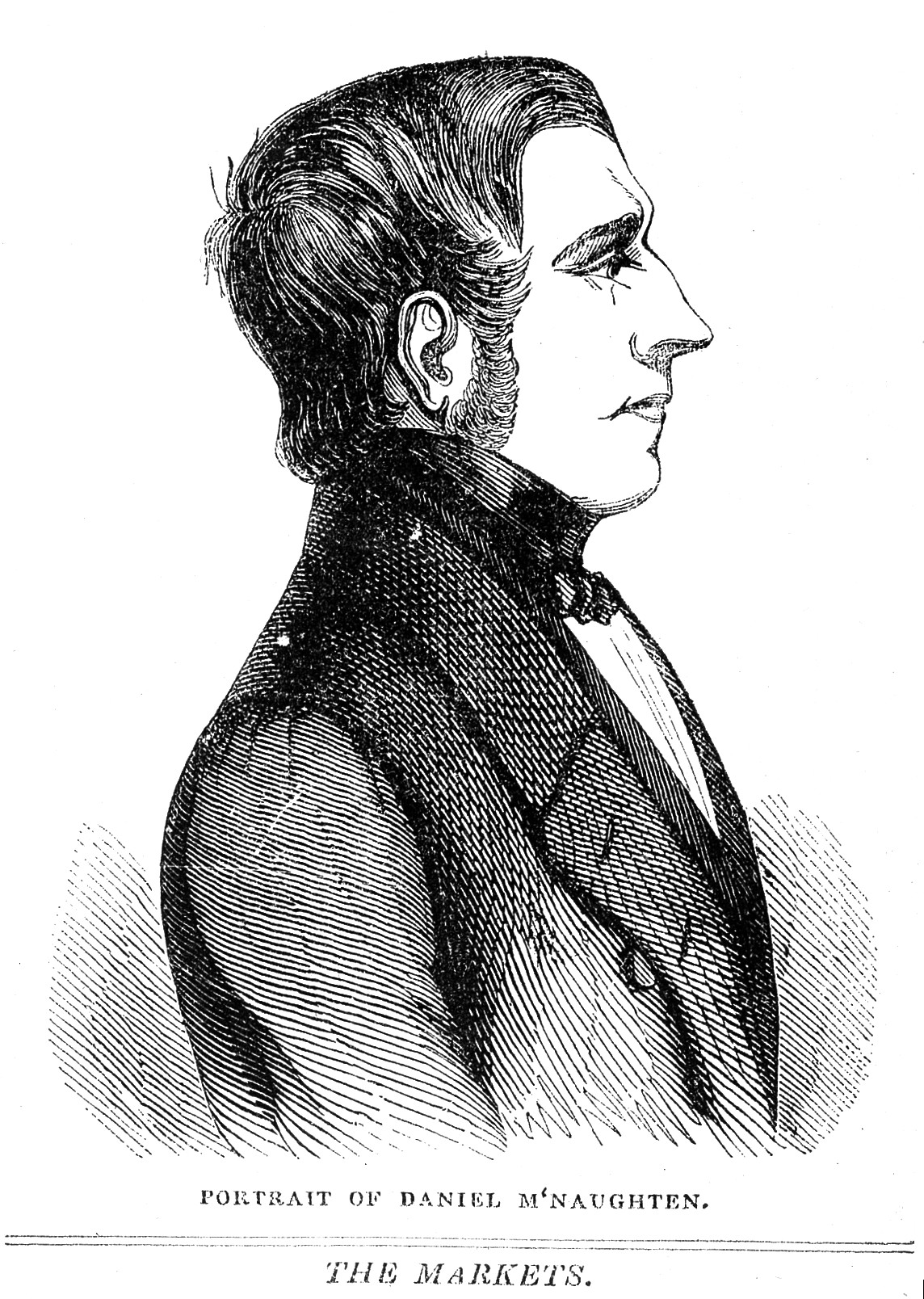
A portrait of Daniel M'Naughten. Illustration for The Illustrated London News, 4 February 1843

After his acquittal M'Naghten was transferred from Newgate Prison to the State Criminal Lunatic Asylum at Bethlem Hospital under the Criminal Lunatics Act 1800. His admission papers describe him in the following words: "Imagines the Tories are his enemies, shy and retiring in his manner." Apart from one hunger strike, which ended with force-feeding, M'Naghten's 21 years at Bethlem appear to have been uneventful. Although no regular employment was provided for the men on the criminal wing of Bethlem, they were encouraged to keep themselves occupied with activities such as painting, drawing, knitting, board games, reading and musical instruments, and also did carpentry and decorating for the hospital.

In 1864, M'Naghten was transferred to the newly opened Broadmoor Asylum, where his admission papers describe him as: "A native of Glasgow, an intelligent man" and record how, when asked if he thinks he must have been out of his mind when he shot Edward Drummond, he answers: "Such was the Verdict – the opinion of the Jury after hearing the Evidence." During his later years at Bethlem, he had been classified as an "imbecile." He developed diabetes and heart problems in Bethlem. By the time he was transferred to Broadmoor, his health was declining. He died on 3 May 1865.

One of M'Naghten's younger half-brothers, Thomas McNaughtan, a doctor, became mayor of Blackpool and was a magistrate.

== Significance ==
The verdict in M'Naghten's trial provoked an outcry in the press and Parliament. Queen Victoria, who had been the target of three assassination attempts between 1840 and 1842, wrote to the prime minister expressing her concern at the verdict, and the House of Lords revived an ancient right to put questions to judges. Five questions relating to crimes committed by individuals with delusions were put to the 12 judges of the Court of Common Pleas. Chief Justice Tindal delivered the answers of 11 judges (Mr Justice Maule dissented in part) to the House of Lords on 19 June 1843. The answer to one of the questions became enshrined in law as the M'Naghten Rules and stated:

To establish a defence on the ground of insanity it must be clearly proved, that, at the time of committing the act, the party accused was labouring under such a defect of reason from disease of the mind, as not to know the nature and quality of the act he was doing, or if he did know it, that he did not know that what he was doing was wrong.

The rules dominated the law on criminal responsibility in England and Wales, the United States and many countries throughout the British Commonwealth for over 100 years. In England and Wales, the defence of insanity to which the rules apply was largely superseded, in cases of murder, by the Scottish concept of diminished responsibility following the passage of the Homicide Act 1957. M'Naghten's defence had successfully argued that he was not legally responsible for an act that arose from a delusion; the rules represented a step backwards to the traditional 'knowing right from wrong' test of criminal insanity. Had the rules been applied in M'Naghten's own case, the verdict might have been different.

David Jones, lecturer in psychology at the Open University, sees the trial as a triumph for the emerging profession of psychiatry and its claims to professional expertise: "The dream of standing tall in the courts as experts in criminal insanity was very alluring to the gentlemen medics who sought a way out of the mire of dismal and stigmatized work in 'the madhouses'."

=== Alternative theories ===
In 1843, a surgeon who was opposed to blood-letting published an anonymous pamphlet claiming that Drummond was killed not by M'Naghten's shot, but by the medical treatment he received afterwards. He said that a gunshot wound of the type sustained by Drummond was not necessarily fatal and criticised Drummond's doctors for their hasty removal of the bullet and repeated blood-lettings.

In his 1981 book Knowing Right From Wrong, Richard Moran, professor of sociology at Mount Holyoke College, argues that there are aspects of M'Naghten's case which have never been fully explained. He doubts that the money found on M'Naghten at the time of his arrest – £750, currently worth £80,000 – could have come entirely from his woodturning business, and points out that M'Naghten's political activity and the possibility that there may have been an element of truth to his complaints of persecution were ignored by the court. In 2004, Moran said that new evidence suggests that M'Naghten was a "political activist who was financed to assassinate the prime minister" and subsequently feigned insanity.
