= R v Parks =

1992 Canadian Supreme Court decision on automatism

- Supreme Court of Canada

Hearing: 1992-01-27 Judgment: 1992-08-27
- Full case name: Her Majesty The Queen v Kenneth James Parks
- Citations: [1992] 2 S.C.R. 871
- Docket No.: 22073
- Prior history: Court of Appeal for Ontario
- Ruling: Appeal Dismissed

Court membership
- Chief Justice: Antonio Lamer; Puisne Justices: Gérard La Forest, Claire L'Heureux-Dubé, John Sopinka, Charles Gonthier, Peter Cory, Beverley McLachlin, William Stevenson, Frank Iacobucci

Reasons given
- Majority: La Forest J, joined by L'Heureux‑Dubé J and Gonthier J
- Concurrence: MacLachlin J, joined by Iacobucci J
- Dissent: Lamer CJ, joined by Cory J
- Stevenson J. took no part in the consideration or decision of the case.

Laws applied
- Canadian Charter of Rights and Freedoms, ss. 1, 7, 11(b).; Criminal Code, R.S.C., 1985, c. C‑46, ss. 16(2), (4), 614(2), 810.; Justices of the Peace Act, 1361 (Eng.), 34 Edw. 3, c. 1.

R v Parks, [1992] 2 S.C.R. 871 is a leading Supreme Court of Canada decision on the criminal automatism defence.

In the early morning of May 24, 1987, Kenneth Parks drove 20 kilometres from Pickering, Ontario, to the house of his in-laws in Scarborough, Ontario. He entered their house with a key they had previously given him and used a tire iron to bludgeon his mother-in-law to death. He then turned on his father-in-law, attempting unsuccessfully to choke him to death. Covered with blood, Parks got back in his car and drove straight to a nearby police station and confessed, turning himself in, stating "I think I have just killed two people."

At trial, Parks argued that he was sleepwalking and thus automatistic and not criminally liable. In his defence, a doctor testified as to his mental state at the time of the murder. From the doctor's evidence, it was determined that the accused was in fact sleepwalking at the time of the incident, and that he was suffering from a disorder of sleep rather than neurological, psychiatric, or other illness. Five neurological experts also confirmed that he was sleepwalking during the time of the incident. The jury acquitted Parks.

The issue before the Supreme Court was whether the condition of sleepwalking can be classified as non-insane automatism or should be classified as "disease of the mind" (i.e. mental disorder automatism) and warrant a verdict of not guilty for reason of insanity. This distinction is a matter of law and decided by the judge.

== Opinion of the Court ==
The court upheld the acquittal, as the evidence presented a reasonable doubt about whether Parks acted voluntarily. Chief Justice Antonio Lamer held that the trial judge was correct in his analysis of the evidence and his decision not to characterize sleepwalking as a mental disorder.

La Forest, writing for L'Heureux-Dubé and Gonthier JJ., agreed with Lamer in the characterization of the evidence, but looked further into the public policy of the defence. La Forest noted that the defence of mental disorder provides for a criminal exception which must be weighed against the interest in public safety. The applicability of the defence must focus on the likelihood of recurrence. For a person to be exempt from criminal liability under the "disease of the mind" defence they must be a "continuing danger" to the public and the condition must be an "internal cause" that stems from the accused's emotional or psychological state.

== See also ==
- Homicidal sleepwalking
