= M'Naghten rules =

Guideline governing legal pleas of insanity

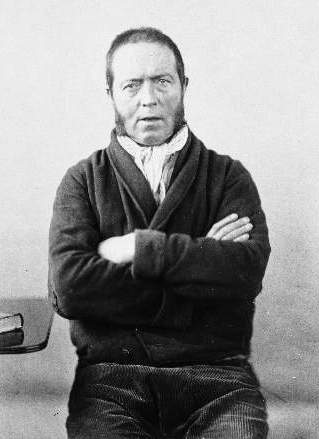
Daniel M'Naghten, c. 1856

The M'Naghten rule(s) (pronounced, and sometimes spelled, McNaughton) is/are a legal test defining the defence of insanity that was formulated by the House of Lords in 1843. It is the established standard in English criminal law. Versions have been adopted in some US states, and other jurisdictions, either as case law or by statute.

Its original wording is a proposed jury instruction:

that every man is to be presumed to be sane, and ... that to establish a defence on the ground of insanity, it must be clearly proved that, at the time of the committing of the act, the party accused was labouring under such a defect of reason, from disease of the mind, as not to know the nature and quality of the act he was doing; or if he did know it, that he did not know he was doing what was wrong.

The rule was created in reaction to the acquittal in 1843 of Daniel M'Naghten on the charge of murdering Edward Drummond. M'Naghten had shot Drummond after mistakenly identifying him as the British Prime Minister Robert Peel, who was the intended target. The acquittal of M'Naghten on the basis of insanity, a hitherto unheard-of defence per se in modern form, caused a public uproar, with protests from the establishment and the press, even prompting Queen Victoria to write to Robert Peel, calling for a "wider interpretation of the verdict". The House of Lords, using a medieval right to question judges, asked a panel of judges presided over by Sir Nicolas Conyngham Tindal, Chief Justice of the Common Pleas, a series of hypothetical questions about the defence of insanity. The principles expounded by this panel have come to be known as the "M'Naghten Rules". M'Naghten himself would have been found guilty if the rules so expounded had been applied at his trial.

The rules so formulated as M'Naghten's Case (1843) 10 C & F 200, or variations of them, are a standard test for criminal liability in relation to mentally challenged defendants in various jurisdictions, either in common law or enacted by statute. When the tests set out by the rules are satisfied, the accused may be adjudged "not guilty by reason of insanity" or "guilty but insane" and the sentence may be a mandatory or discretionary, but usually indeterminate, period of treatment in a secure hospital facility, or otherwise at the discretion of the court, depending on the country and the offence charged, instead of a punitive disposal.

== Historical development ==
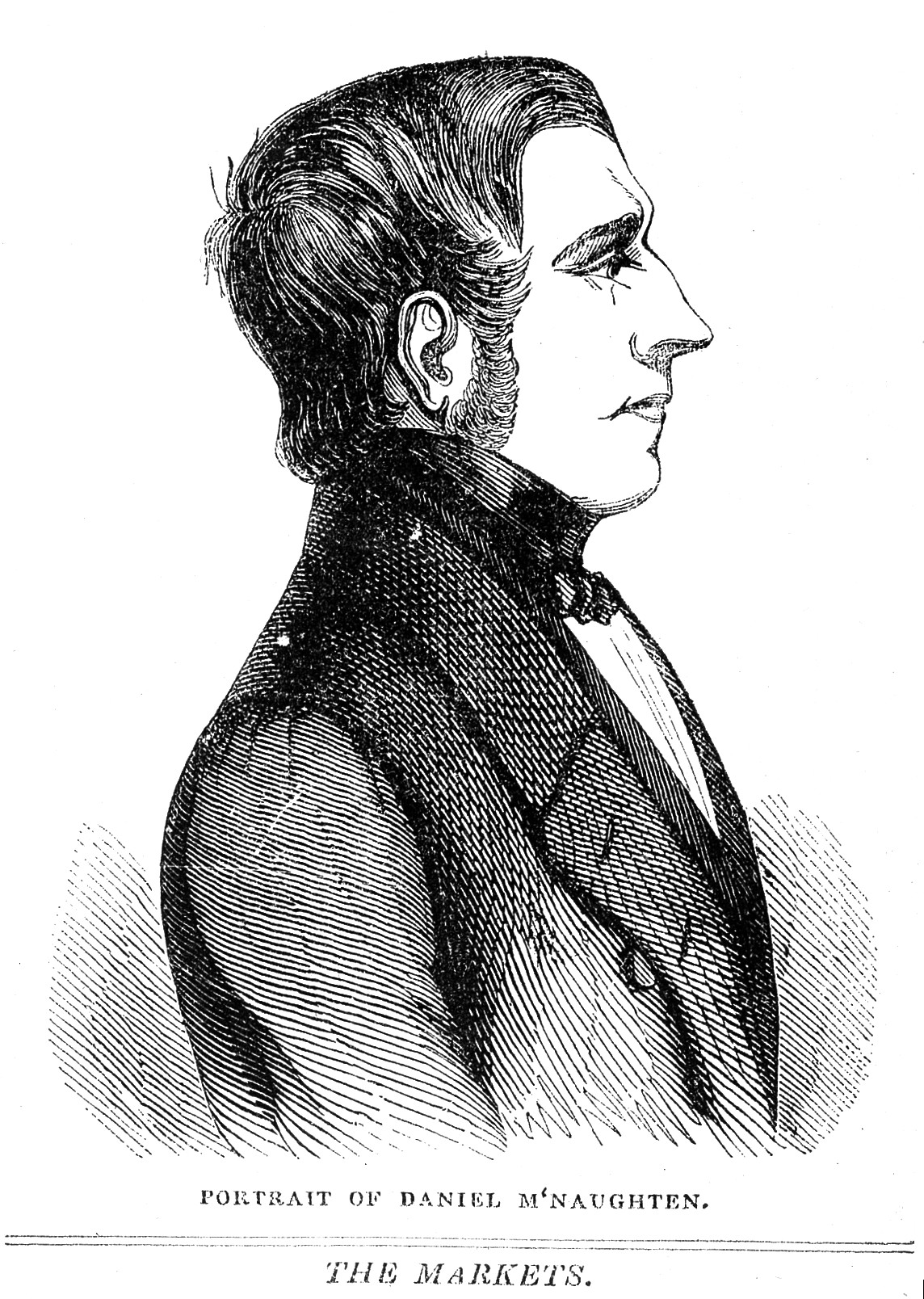
A portrait of Daniel M'Naughten. Illustration for The Illustrated London News, 4 February 1843

There are various justifications for the exemption of the insane from criminal responsibility. When mental incapacity is successfully raised as a defence in a criminal trial it absolves a defendant from liability: it applies public policies in relation to criminal responsibility by applying a rationale of compassion, accepting that it is morally wrong to punish a person if that person is deprived permanently or temporarily of the capacity to form a necessary mental intent that the definition of a crime requires. Punishment of the obviously mentally ill by the state may undermine public confidence in the penal system. A utilitarian and humanitarian approach suggests that the interests of society are better served by treatment.

Historically, insanity was seen as grounds for leniency. In pre-Norman times in England there was no distinct criminal code – a murderer could pay compensation to the victim's family under the principle of "buy off the spear or bear it". The insane person's family were expected to pay any compensation for the crime. In Norman times, insanity was not seen as a defence in itself, but a special circumstance in which the jury would deliver a guilty verdict and refer the defendant to the King for a pardon

since they are without sense and reason and can no more commit a tort or a felony than a brute animal, since they are not far removed from brutes, as is evident in the case of a minor, for if he should kill another while under age he would not suffer judgment.

In R v Arnold 1724 16 How St. Tr. 765, the test for insanity was expressed in the following terms

whether the accused is totally deprived of his understanding and memory and knew what he was doing "no more than a wild beast or a brute, or an infant".

The next major advance occurred in Hadfield's Trial 1800 27 How St. Tr. 765, in which the court decided that a crime committed under some delusion would be excused, only if it would have been excusable had the delusion been true. This would deal with the situation, for example, when the accused imagines he is cutting through a loaf of bread, whereas in fact he is cutting through a person's neck.

Each jurisdiction may have its own standards of the insanity defence. More than one standard can be applied to any case based on multiple jurisdictions.

== M'Naghten rules ==
The House of Lords delivered the following exposition of the rules:

the jurors ought to be told in all cases that every man is to be presumed to be sane, and to possess a sufficient degree of reason to be responsible for his crimes, until the contrary be proved to their satisfaction; and that to establish a defence on the ground of insanity, it must be clearly proved that, at the time of the committing of the act, the party accused was labouring under such a defect of reason, from disease of the mind, as not to know the nature and quality of the act he was doing; or, if he did know it, that he did not know he was doing what was wrong.

The central issue of this definition may be stated as, "Did the defendant know what he was doing, or, if so, that it was wrong?", and the issues raised have been analysed in subsequent appellate decisions.

=== Presumption of sanity and burden of proof ===
Sanity is a rebuttable presumption and the burden of proof is on the party denying it; the standard of proof is on a balance of probabilities, that is to say that mental incapacity is more likely than not. If this burden is successfully discharged, the party relying upon it is entitled to succeed. In Lord Denning's judgement in Bratty v Attorney-General for Northern Ireland [1963] AC 386, whenever the defendant makes an issue of his state of mind, the prosecution can adduce evidence of insanity. However, this will normally only arise to negate the defence case when automatism or diminished responsibility is in issue.

In practical terms, the defence will be more likely to raise the issue of mental incapacity to negate or minimise criminal liability. In R v Clarke [1972] 1 All ER 219 a defendant charged with a shoplifting claimed she had no mens rea because she had absent-mindedly walked out of the shop without paying because she suffered from depression. When the prosecution attempted to adduce evidence that this constituted insanity within the Rules, she changed her plea to guilty, but on appeal the Court ruled that she had been merely denying mens rea rather than raising a defence under the Rules and her conviction was quashed. The general rule was stated that the Rules apply only to cases in which the defect of reason is substantial.

=== Disease of the mind ===
Whether a particular condition amounts to a disease of the mind within the Rules is not a medical but a legal question to be decided in accordance with the ordinary rules of interpretation. It seems that any disease which produces a malfunctioning of the mind is a disease of the mind and need not be a disease of the brain itself. The term has been held to cover numerous conditions:

- In R v Kemp [1957] 1 QB 399 arteriosclerosis or a hardening of the arteries caused loss of control during which the defendant attacked his wife with a hammer. This was an internal condition and a disease of the mind.
- In R v Sullivan [1984] AC 156 during an epileptic episode, the defendant caused grievous bodily harm: epilepsy was an internal condition and a disease of the mind, and the fact that the state was transitory was irrelevant.
- In R v Quick; R v Paddison [1973] QB 910 the defendant committed an assault while in a state of hypoglycaemia caused by the insulin he had taken, the alcohol he had consumed and not eating properly. It was ruled that the judge should have left the defence of automatism open to him, so his conviction was quashed (he had pleaded guilty rather than not guilty by reason of insanity). This was where the internal/external divide doctrine was first expressed, probably due to judicial reluctance to hospitalise someone for a condition that could be cured by a sugar lump. It is doubtful that a jury would have accepted a defence of automatism, but nonetheless the issue should have been left to them.
- In R v Hennessy [1989] 1 WLR 287 a diabetic stole a car and drove it while suffering from a mild attack of hyperglycaemia caused by stress and a failure to take his insulin. Lane LCJ said at 294
  In our judgment, stress, anxiety and depression can no doubt be the result of the operation of external factors, but they are not, it seems to us, in themselves separately or together external factors of the kind capable in law of causing or contributing to a state of automatism. They constitute a state of mind which is prone to recur. They lack the feature of novelty or accident, which is the basis of the distinction drawn by Lord Diplock in R v Sullivan 1984 AC 156, 172. It is contrary to the observations of Devlin J., to which we have just referred in Hill v Baxter (1958) 1 QB 277, 285. It does not, in our judgment, come within the scope of the exception of some external physical factor such as a blow on the head or the administration of an anaesthetic.
- In Bratty v Attorney-General for Northern Ireland [1963] AC 386 Lord Denning observed obiter that a crime committed while sleepwalking would appear to him to be one committed as an automaton. However, the ruling in R v Sullivan that diseases of the mind need have no permanence led many academics to suggest that sleepwalkers might well be found to be suffering from a disease of the mind with internal causes unless there was clear evidence of an external causal factor.
- In R v Burgess [1991] 2 QB 92 the Court of Appeal ruled that the defendant, who wounded a woman by hitting her with a video recorder while sleepwalking, was insane under the M'Naghten Rules. Lord Lane said, "We accept that sleep is a normal condition, but the evidence in the instant case indicates that sleepwalking, and particularly violence in sleep, is not normal."

The courts have clearly drawn a distinction between internal and external factors affecting a defendant's mental condition. This is partly based on risk of recurrence, whereby the High Court of Australia has expressed that the defence of automatism is unable to be considered when the mental disorder has been proved transient and as such not likely to recur. However, the distinction between insanity and automatism is difficult because the distinction between internal and external divide is difficult.

Many diseases consist of a predisposition, considered an internal cause, combined with a precipitant, which would be considered an external cause. Actions committed while sleepwalking would normally be considered as "non-insane automatism", but often alcohol and stress trigger bouts of sleepwalking and make them more likely to be violent. The diabetic who takes insulin but does not eat properly – is that an internal or external cause?

=== Nature and quality of the act ===
This phrase refers to the physical nature and quality of the act, rather than the moral quality. It covers the situation where the defendant does not know what he is physically doing. Two common examples used are:

- The defendant cuts a woman's throat under the delusion that he is cutting a loaf of bread,
- The defendant chops off a sleeping man's head because he has the deluded idea that it would be great fun to see the man looking for it when he wakes up.

The judges were specifically asked if a person could be excused if he committed an offence in consequence of an insane delusion. They replied that if he labours under such partial delusion only, and is not in other respects insane, "he must be considered in the same situation as to responsibility as if the facts with respect to which the delusion exists were real". This rule requires the court to take the facts as the accused believed them to be and follows Hadfield's Trial, above. If the delusions do not prevent the defendant from having mens rea there will be no defence.

In R v Bell [1984] Crim LR 685, the defendant smashed a van through the entrance gates of a holiday camp because "It was like a secret society in there, I wanted to do my bit against it" as instructed by God. It was held that, as the defendant had been aware of his actions, he could neither have been in a state of automatism nor insane, and the fact that he believed that God had told him to do this merely provided an explanation of his motive and did not prevent him from knowing that what he was doing was wrong in the legal sense. This rule explains the test for insanity and the determination of criminal liability.

=== Knowledge that the act was wrong ===
The interpretation of this clause is a subject of controversy among legal authorities, and different standards may apply in different jurisdictions.

"Wrong" was interpreted to mean legally wrong, rather than morally wrong, in the case of Windle [1952] 2QB 826; [1952] 2 All ER 1 246, where the defendant killed his wife with an overdose of aspirin; he telephoned the police and said, "I suppose they will hang me for this." It was held that this was sufficient to show that although the defendant was suffering from a mental illness, he was aware that his act was wrong, and the defence was not allowed.

Under this interpretation, there may be cases where the mentally ill know that their conduct is legally prohibited, but it is arguable that their mental condition prevents them making the connection between an act being legally prohibited and the societal requirement to conform their conduct to the requirements of the criminal law.

As an example of a contrasting interpretation in which defendant lacking knowledge that the act was morally wrong meets the M'Naghten standards, there are the instructions the judge is required to provide to the jury in cases in New York State when the defendant has raised an insanity plea as a defence:

... with respect to the term "wrong", a person lacks substantial capacity to know or appreciate that conduct is wrong if that person, as a result of mental disease or defect, lacked substantial capacity to know or appreciate either that the conduct was against the law or that it was against commonly held moral principles, or both.

There is other support in the authorities for this interpretation of the standards enunciated in the findings presented to the House of Lords regarding M'Naghten's case:

If it be accepted, as can hardly be denied, that the answers of the judges to the questions asked by the House of Lords in 1843 are to be read in the light of the then existing case-law and not as novel pronouncements of a legislative character, then the [Australian] High Court's analysis in Stapleton's Case is compelling. Their exhaustive examination of the extensive case-law concerning the defence of insanity prior to and at the time of the trial of M'Naughten establishes convincingly that it was morality and not legality which lay as a concept behind the judges' use of "wrong" in the M'Naghten rules.

=== Offences of strict liability ===
In DPP v Harper (1997) it was held that insanity is not generally a defence to strict liability offences. In this instance, the accused was driving with excess alcohol. By definition, the accused is sufficiently aware of the nature of the activity to commit the actus reus of driving and presumably knows that driving while drunk is legally wrong. Any other feature of the accused's knowledge is irrelevant.

=== Function of the jury ===
Section 1 of the Criminal Procedure (Insanity and Unfitness to Plead) Act 1991, which extends only to England and Wales, provides that a jury shall not return a special verdict that "the accused is not guilty by reason of insanity" except on the written or oral evidence of two or more registered medical practitioners of whom at least one has special experience in the field of mental disorder. This may require the jury to decide between conflicting medical evidence which they are not necessarily equipped to do, but the law goes further and allows them to disagree with the experts if there are facts or surrounding circumstances which, in the opinion of the court, justify the jury in coming to that conclusion.

=== Sentencing ===
Under section 5 of the Criminal Procedure (Insanity) Act 1964 (as amended), again extending only to England and Wales:

1. Where the sentence for the offence to which the finding relates is fixed by law (e.g. murder), the court must make a hospital order (see section 37 Mental Health Act 1983) with a restriction order limiting discharge and other rights (see section 41 Mental Health Act 1983).
2. In any other case the court may make:
  - a hospital order (with or without a restriction order);
  - a supervision order; or
  - an order for absolute discharge.

== Alternative rules ==
The insanity defence article has a number of alternative tests that have been used at different times and places. As one example, the ALI test replaced the M'Naghten rule in many parts of the United States for many years until the 1980s; when, in the aftermath of John Hinckley shooting US President Ronald Reagan, many ALI states returned to a variation of M'Naghten.

== Case law ==
- People v. Drew

== In popular culture ==
The M'Naghten rules are at the focus of John Grisham's legal thriller A Time to Kill. The M'Naghten rules apply in the US State of Mississippi, where the plot is set, and using them is the only way for the lawyer protagonist to save his client.

== See also ==
- Insanity defence – Legal concept regarding a defendant's state of mind
- Policeman at the elbow – Insanity defence
- R v Burgess (1991) – 1991 English legal appeal
- John and Lorena Bobbitt § Arrest and trial
