= Bratty v Attorney-General for Northern Ireland =

UK legal case

- Court: House of Lords
- Full case name: Bratty v Attorney-General for Northern Ireland
- Decided: 3 October 1961
- Citation: 1961 UKHL 3
- Cases cited: R v Cottle [1958] NZLR. 999; R v Kemp [1957] 1 QB 399; R v Charlson [1955] 1 WLR 317; Woolmington v DPP [1935] AC 462; R v Tolson (1889) 23 QBD 168; Hill v Baxter [1958] 1 QB 277; R v Podola [1960] 1 QB 325; Attorney-General for South Australia v Brown [1960] AC 432; R v Byrne (1960) 2 QB 396; DPP v Beard [1920] AC 479; and others
- Legislation cited: common law

Case history
- Subsequent action: None

Court membership
- Judges sitting: Lord Kilmuir, LC; Lord Tucker; Lord Denning; Lord Morris of Borth-y-Gest; Lord Hodson

Keywords
- Murder; manslaughter; intent; mens rea; automatism

Bratty v Attorney-General for Northern Ireland [1963] AC 386, [1961] 3 All ER 523, [1961] UKHL 3 is a House of Lords decision relating to non-insane automatism. The court decided that medical evidence is needed to prove that the defendant was not aware of what they were doing, and if this is available, the burden of proof lies with the prosecution to prove that intention was present.

== Facts ==
In March 1961, twenty-year-old George Bratty had given a lift in his car to Josephine Fitzsimmons, who was later found dead under a hedge near Hillsborough, County Down, Northern Ireland, having been strangled. Bratty was later interviewed by police and asked to explain scratches on his neck. He made a statement in which he said, inter alia

I had some terrible feeling, and then a sort of a blackness. Just with that, I took one look at her, caught her, threw her right over the back of the seat into the back. I caught her with my two hands.

and then

I didn't mean to do what really happened .... nothing like that happened until last night. I apologise for what happened. I don't think it would have happened only that terrible feeling came over me at the time. I don't know really what caused it at all.

== Trial ==
Bratty's trial was heard at the Downpatrick Assizes, and his defence team proposed alternative verdicts, namely

- That Bratty was not guilty on the basis that he was in a state of automatism and not "master of his own actions", the only cause suggested for this being psychomotor epilepsy.
- that if the jury rejected the first defence, Bratty's mental condition was so impaired and confused and he was so deficient in reason that he was not capable of forming the necessary intent for murder, and that the verdict should instead be manslaughter.
- that if the jury were unable to come to either the first or second verdict, the accused may be guilty but insane on the ground that he did not know the nature and quality of his acts, or if he did, that he did not know that they were wrong.

The judge refused to allow the first two defences to be considered by the jury, and accordingly gave a direction only on the issue of insanity. The jury rejected this defence, and Bratty was convicted. He appealed against the judge's refusal to allow consideration of the first two defences.

== Appeals ==
The Court of Criminal Appeal in Northern Ireland considered that automatism meant

the state of a person who, though capable of action, is not conscious of what he is doing ... it means unconscious involuntary action, and it is a defence because the mind does not go with what is being done.

It was ruled that the judge had been correct not to allow the first defence argument to go before the jury because it relied on a "disease of the mind" within the M'Naghten Rules, and that whether insanity or automatism was in issue, the burden of proof would be upon the defendant. Bratty appealed further against these decisions.
