= Richard Rosner (psychiatrist) =

American psychiatrist

Richard Rosner (May 1, 1941 – January 6, 2025) was an American psychiatrist specializing in forensic psychiatry. He was a Medical Director of the Forensic Psychiatry Clinic of Bellevue Hospital. Rosner developed and published the four-step model of forensic psychiatry, a conceptual framework for organizing and analyzing data.

== Life and career ==
Rosner grew up in Brooklyn. After graduating from Princeton University, he applied for surgical residency he did not get. Rosner decided to go into psychiatry in the face of being drafted for the Vietnam War. He did his residency at Mount Sinai Medical Center before taking a position at Bellevue. He met his future wife Bernice, a nurse, while in school. She died in 2001.

In 1974 he succeeded Robert Goldstein as director of the clinic. He is a Clinical Professor in the Department of Psychiatry at New York University. He has served as president of the Tri–State Chapter of the American Academy of Psychiatry and the Law (AAPL; 1976–1986), national AAPL (1987–1988), the American Board of Forensic Psychiatry (1989–1990), the Accreditation Council on Fellowships in Adolescent Psychiatry (1992–present), the American Academy of Forensic Sciences (AAFS; 1996–1997), the Association of Directors of Forensic Psychiatry Fellowships (1996–1998), and the American Society for Adolescent Psychiatry (2003–2004).

He appears as an expert witness, and has commented on mental health issues surrounding high-profile trials like Jeffrey Dahmer's. He has authored many books, including Principles and Practice of Forensic Psychiatry.
