= George James Guthrie =

English surgeon

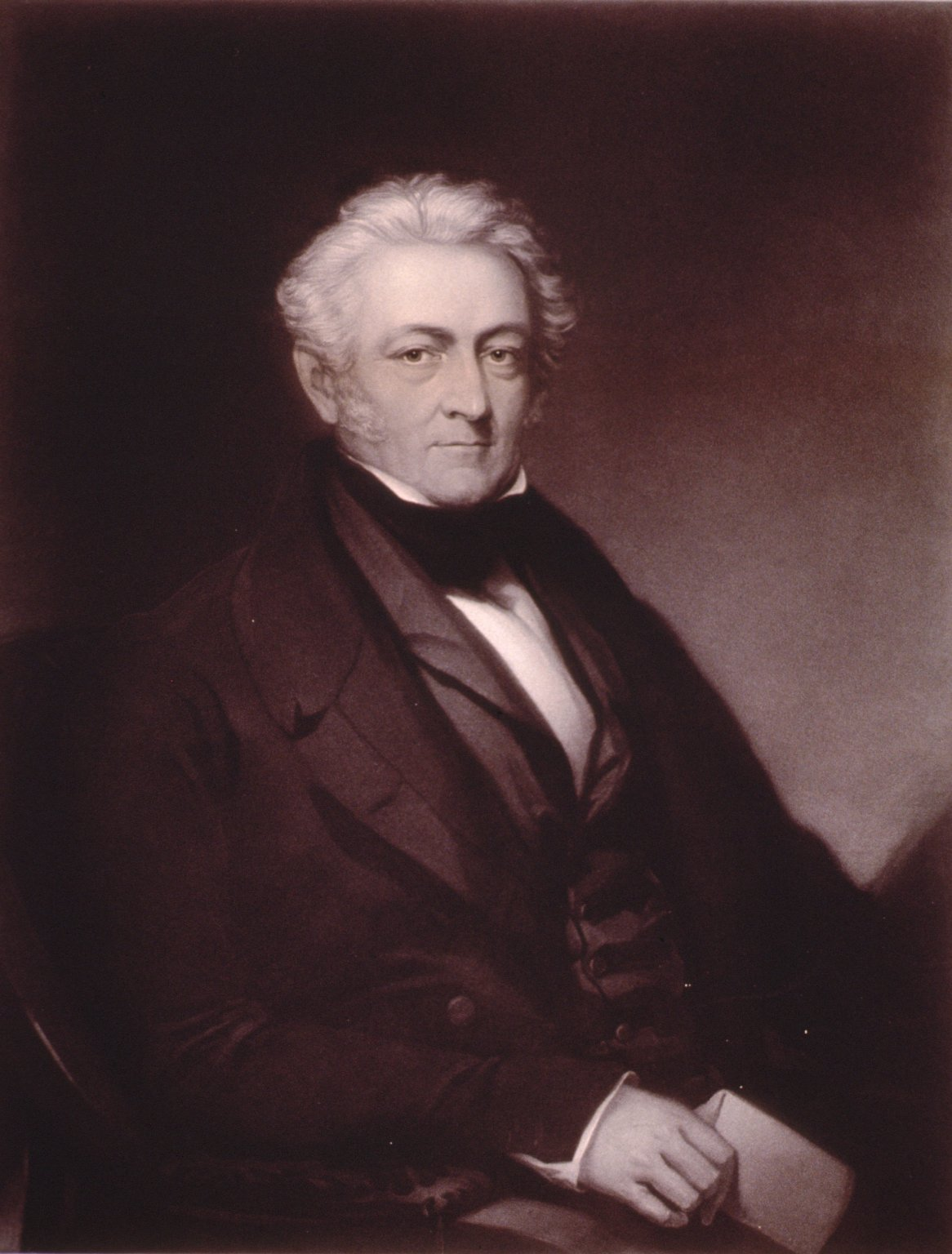
George James Guthrie

George James Guthrie (1 May 1785 – 1 May 1856) was an English surgeon, born in London of Scottish parents. He was admitted to membership in the Royal College of Surgeons in 1801. As army surgeon, he served in the Peninsular campaign, and his work there won the praise of the Duke of Wellington. In 1816 he began a series of lectures in surgery to the officers of the army and navy, which he continued for nearly 30 years. In 1824 he became a member of the council of the Royal College of Surgeons, of which he was three times president, and also professor in 1818–1831. His principal works are:

- On Gunshot Wounds of the Extremities Requiring the Different Operations of Amputations, and their After Treatment (1814; sixth edition, 1855)
- Lectures on the Operative Surgery of the Eye (1823; third edition, 1838)
- On the Anatomy and Diseases of the Urinary and Sexual Organs (third edition, 1843)
- Commentaries on the Surgery of the War in Portugal, Spain, France, and the Netherlands (sixth edition, 1862 (2021))

== Term ==
- Guthrie's muscle—The sphincter urethrae membranaceae.

The American Illustrated Medical Dictionary (1938)
