= Automatism (law) =

Legal defence based on lack of awareness of actions

In criminal law, automatism is a rarely used criminal defence. It is one of the mental condition defences that relate to the mental state of the defendant. Automatism can be seen variously as lack of voluntariness, lack of culpability (unconsciousness) or excuse. Automatism means that the defendant was not aware of their actions when making the particular movements that constituted the illegal act.

For example, in 1859, Esther Griggs threw her child out of a first floor window believing that the house was on fire, while having a sleep terror. In 2002, Peter Buck, lead guitarist of the band R.E.M., was cleared of several charges, including assault, which resulted from automatism brought on by a bad interaction between alcohol and sleeping pills. In a 2009 case in Aberporth in west Wales, Brian Thomas strangled his wife in their camper van, also during a sleep terror, when he mistook his wife for an intruder. The defence of automatism is denying that the person was acting in the sense that the criminal law demands. As such it is really a denial-of-proof – the defendant is asserting that the offence is not made out. The prosecution does not have to disprove the defence as is sometimes erroneously reported; the prosecution has to prove all the elements of the offence including the voluntary act requirement. Automatism is a defence even against strict liability crimes like dangerous driving, where no intent is necessary.

There are several limitations to the defence of automatism in English law. Prior fault generally excludes automatism. Intoxication generally excludes automatism, even when involuntary. Any defence that rests on insanity comes under the M'Naghten rules. Under English law internal causes of automatism are generally judged to be insane automatism and so result in the special verdict (not guilty by reason of insanity) rather than simple acquittal.

== Scope ==
Automatism is arguably the only defence that excludes responsibility by negating the existence of the actus reus which uniquely allows it to be a defence to both conventional and strict liability offences (although this argument could be extended to the status defence of insanity, too). Strict automatism is a denial of actus reus and therefore most commonly used as a defence against strict liability offences. There are a number of reasons why a person may go into a state of automatism, including dissociation or hypo or hyperglycemia. Unconsciousness is the defence of denial of mens rea, which is easier to prove and hence more commonly used for non-strict liability crimes. For example, in cases of homicidal sleepwalking the illegal act is typically not denied but the intent to kill is. The defendant will typically be perplexed and confused and will not cover up the episode. Kenneth Parks, after killing his mother-in-law and severely injuring his father-in-law, drove to the police station stating that he thought he had killed some people. The person's movements seem purposeful - the sleepwalker interacts with their environment in a limited way. Nonetheless the sleepwalker is not conscious of their actions. The use of the term "automatism" for these situations causes some confusion, as in these cases it is really the lack of intent on the part of the defendant which denies the mens rea of the offence rather than the actus reus (although this distinction is problematic in many instances), better called "unconsciousness". Intention is a problem in crimes of strict liability. Very few people intend to crash their vehicles, so clearly something better than intent is required to define automatism.

Another issue with automatism is that when the issue is raised by the defence as a realistic defence (an evidentiary basis), the prosecution then has to prove beyond reasonable doubt that the defendant was acting voluntarily. This is the case for several other defences e.g. duress. The justification for this is that voluntary action is part of the definition of the offence, and therefore something under the presumption of innocence the prosecution has to prove. The evidentiary burden was laid down in Hill v Baxter where the defence of automatism failed because there was no good evidence for the alleged blackout. Evidentiary burden means that the defendant needs to provide evidence to satisfy the judge that the issue should be put to the jury, which normally requires medical evidence (although R v Woolley, in which an HGV driver crashed after sneezing, proved an exception).

== Exclusions ==
Because automatism is such a comprehensive defence, there are various exclusions to an automatism defence. The person must not be at fault. The classic example of this is falling asleep at the wheel of a car (Kay v Butterworth). Although one is not responsible for acts done while asleep, one can be held responsible for driving in a state where one would fall asleep at the wheel. The issue of prior fault applies to many diabetics who suffer hypoglycaemia while driving. Voluntary (and often involuntary) intoxication cannot cause legal automatism.

In many jurisdictions, there is a distinction made between "sane automatism" and "insane automatism". Where the involuntariness is caused by a mental illness, or "disease of the mind", as per the M'Naghten rules, it will be regarded as "insane automatism" and will often result in a special verdict of "not guilty by reason of insanity". This can have significant practical effects for the defendant, as they still may be detained after a special verdict as opposed to the straight acquittal available through sane automatism.

The M'Naghten rules require a "disease of mind", which requires an internal cause. This is medically nonsensical, and does not always bear much relationship to continuing risk which is the main justification. This means that insane automatisms do not require total loss of voluntary control (see below). Thus they are easier to prove in some circumstances, but conversely the burden of proof is on the defendant. Sleepwalking was initially an exception to the internal-external doctrine until the case of R v Burgess.

The most contentious qualifier is that there must be a total loss of control. In Attorney-General's Reference No 2 of 1992, this definition of legal automatism was confirmed. A lorry driver had crashed, and his defence (backed up by expert evidence) was that the monotony of motorway driving had caused him to go into a state of "driving without awareness" where, although he could make minor adjustments to follow the road, he was not truly conscious of driving. This followed the decisions of Watmore v Jenkins and Broome v Perkins where diabetic drivers who had driven three miles or more were held to not have the total loss of control necessary for the defence of automatism. This definition is problematic, and the Law Commission, Butler Committee and leading legal academic R. D. Mackay have all argued that this definition is too restrictive.

Classically automatisms in the legal sense have been defined as spasms, reflexes, convulsions or acts committed in a state of unconsciousness e.g. sleep. However, there have been cases where the automatism defence was successful when none of these apply. In R v T the defendant had been raped a few days prior to committing a robbery. She was clearly conscious of what she was doing, but in a dissociative state due to post-traumatic stress disorder from being raped. However, in R v Isitt, when the defendant drove away from a collision and evaded a police roadblock in a dissociative state, the defence was not successful. The Ontario Court of Appeal expressed a logical way of distinguishing such cases in Rabey v The Queen. There, the defendant went into a dissociative state due to being spurned. It was held that such a commonplace occurrence was not the sort of external stimulus that would cause legal automatism (although the insanity plea would be open to him).

== Omissions ==
The problem with omissions and automatism is that the strict legal definition requires total loss of control. A person may well not be able to avoid a crash even though they have some residual control. In this case, the law is imposing liability for failing to do the impossible. Several commentators, including H. L. A. Hart, have suggested that responsibility for omissions must be framed with reference to the actor's capabilities at the time, rather than the objective test.

== Voluntariness ==
La Forest J. in the Canadian Supreme Court case of R v Parks, asserted that automatism is "conceptually a subset of the voluntariness requirement". One of the main rationales of criminal law is to use the threat of punishment as a deterrent to future wrongdoing. But, if an individual is to be deterred, he or she must be acting under voluntary control. If something is interfering with this control, automatism may be available as an excuse. Duress is not an example of involuntary action as although the choices faced by the person under duress may be difficult, nonetheless they are still acting voluntarily. Some would describe action under duress as non-voluntary as opposed to involuntary. This distinction is emphasized by the exclusion of the defense of duress for murder. In the words of the Queensland Court of Criminal Appeal in R v Milloy, Thomas J says, that for automatism to succeed:

impairment of relevant capacities as distinct from total deprivation of these capacities [will not suffice] ... it is fundamental to a defence of automatism that the actor has no control over his actions.

== Reflex movements ==
One of the difficulties is defining what a voluntary action is and is not. Words like "willed" have the same difficulty: a voluntary action is one that is willed, whatever that means. In Australia, Ryan v The Queen, the defendant entered a shop with a loaded rifle for a robbery. In a sudden attack, the shop assistant caught the appellant by surprise, causing him by a reflex action to discharge the gun, killing the assistant instantly. The Crimes Act 1900 (NSW) requires that "murder shall be committed where the act of the accused ... causing the death charged". Barwick CJ said: "That a crime cannot be committed except by an act or omission is axiomatic. It is basic, in my opinion, that the 'act' of an accused ... must be a 'willed', a voluntary act which has caused the death charged. It is the act which must be willed, though its consequences may not be intended."

Concerning whether the firing of the gun was willed so as to constitute an "act" for the purposes of the murder charge, Elliot commented that "his reaction was like the sudden movement of a tennis player retrieving a difficult shot; not accompanied by conscious planning, but certainly not involuntary". Despite accepting that the actual discharge was involuntary, Barwick CJ confirmed the murder conviction because "the act causing death" included the general circumstances in which the gun was fired. The judge and jury

could have concluded that the act causing death was the presentation of the cocked, loaded gun with the safety catch unapplied and that its involuntary discharge was a likelihood which ought to have been in the contemplation of the applicant when presenting the gun in the circumstances.

In the U.S., in People v. Decina (1956) 2 NY2d 13 3, 143 the defendant had epilepsy. While driving his car, he had an epileptic seizure and the car went out of control, killing four people. Decina was convicted of negligent homicide because he had voluntarily driven an automobile without assistance knowing that a seizure was possible, breaching Penal Law 1053 on the negligent operation of a motor vehicle:

Even though a reflex or a convulsion is an excuse, the actor in this instance cannot use this defence because he knowingly undertook the risk of driving while suffering from a disease that is characterised by frequent convulsions, etc. The actus reus was established when he began driving.

This reasoning matches that in English law where any foreseeable loss of control is excluded from automatism. To hold otherwise would be to excuse any driver or other person engaged in an activity where public safety is an issue, from the consequences of a loss of control that occurred after losing consciousness. Only sudden and unexpected health problems avoid culpability. In Scots law, Cardle v Mulrainey (1992) SCCR 658 applies the general requirement for cases involving a defence based on insanity or a comparable state, that there must be a total alienation of reason leading to a loss of self-control, to a case in which the accused claimed that he had involuntarily consumed a drug which had the effect that he knew what he was doing but was unable to refrain from acting (at 668):

Where, as in the present case, the accused knew what he was doing and was aware of the nature and quality of his acts and that what he was doing was wrong, he cannot be said to be suffering from the total alienation of reason in regard to the crime with which he is charged which the defence requires. The sheriff found in finding that the respondent's ability to reason the consequences of his actions to himself was affected by his ingestion of the drug. The finding narrates that he was unable to take account in his actions of the fact that they were criminal in character and to refrain for them. But this inability to exert self-control, which the sheriff has described as an inability to complete the reasoning process, must be distinguished from the essential requirement that there should be total alienation of the accused's mental faculties of reasoning and of understanding what he is doing.

== Sleep ==
The Australian Model Criminal Code Committee states the law as follows (at 14–15):

At the minimum there needs to be some operation of the will before a physical movement is described as an act. The physical movements of a person who is asleep, for example, probably should not be regarded as acts at all, and certainly should not be regarded as acts for the purposes of criminal responsibility. These propositions are embodied in the rule that people are not held responsible for involuntary 'acts', that is, physical movements which occur without there being any will to perform that act. This situation is usually referred to as automatism.

In the U.S., People v Huey Newton (1970) 8 CA3d 359 holds that unconsciousness, when not self-induced (say, as by voluntary intoxication), is a complete defence to a criminal act even though the defendant's acts seem very goal-oriented. The medical evidence was that "[a] gunshot wound which penetrates in a body cavity, the abdominal cavity or the thoracic cavity is very likely to produce a profound reflex shock reaction, that is quite different from a gunshot wound which penetrates only skin and muscle and it is not at all uncommon for a person shot in the abdomen to lose consciousness and go into this reflex shock condition for short periods of time up to half an hour or so." But the reflexive activity or unconsciousness need not cause physical collapse: it can exist where the subject physically acts in fact, but is not at the time conscious of acting (cf some European continental jurisdictions classify conduct resulting from automatism under the rubric of unconsciousness). In R. v. Cogdon (1950), unreported but noted in Morris, Somnambulistic Homicide: Ghosts, Spiders and North Koreans (1951) 5 Res Judicatae 29, the defendant struck her daughter on the head with an axe while sleepwalking and dreaming about North Koreans. Her movements were not voluntary, so she was acquitted. This interpretation of automatism is consistent with Lord Denning's dicta in Bratty v Attorney-General for Northern Ireland (1963) AC 386, at 409:

No act is punishable if it is done involuntarily: and an involuntary act in this context – some people nowadays prefer to speak of it as 'automatism' – means an act which is done by the muscles without any control by the mind, such as a spasm, a reflex action or a convulsion; or an act done by a person who is not conscious of what he is doing, such as an act done whilst suffering from a concussion or whilst sleepwalking.

Situations involving hypnotism, concussion, and sleepwalking may involve apparently deliberate and purposeful conduct. In fact this is the case for many situations where the defense of automatism is presented – spasms or reflex actions are rarely likely to be perceived as criminally liable acts. As for sleepwalking itself, the Canadian case of R v Parks exemplifies a certain judicial willingness to regard a sleepwalker as behaving as an automaton even though he had performed apparently goal-directed acts. The accused fell asleep in his living room. A few hours later he got up and drove 23 kilometres to his in-laws' home. Still asleep, he entered the house, found a knife in the kitchen and went to the bedroom where his in-laws were sleeping. He strangled and cut his father in-law, who survived the attack. The mother in-law died from the repeated stab wounds and the brutal beating. The medical experts at trial unanimously agreed that the accused was sleepwalking and that sleepwalking was not a "disease of mind". The Supreme Court agreed and held that sleepwalking can negate the voluntary ingredient of the actus reus. There is widespread disagreement among forensic sleep experts that Kenneth Parks was in fact sleepwalking – it is not entirely clear the reason why the prosecution did not call its own experts on sleepwalking, one explanation being frank disbelief that the defence could succeed.

The point made in these cases is that the key component of the two categories of cases identified by Lord Denning in Bratty is a defendant's inability to control their behaviour and not the way in which loss or impairment of the conscious or deliberative functions of the mind arises. Similarly, under the Swedish penal code, acts during sleep and unconsciousness, reflex movements, spasms and convulsions, as well as acts performed under physical force or hypnosis are generally not punishable. Moreover, omissions caused by sleep, weakness, physical numbness or anaesthesia are generally not blameworthy. The issue is whether the accused had the ability to control the behaviour, including taking early precautions to avoid loss of control. But, in English law, the ruling in R v Sullivan (1984) AC 156 held that, for the purposes of the M'Naghten rules, a disease of the mind need have no permanence, leading many academics to suggest that sleepwalkers might well be found to be suffering from a disease of the mind with internal causes unless there was clear evidence of an external causal factor. In R v Burgess the Court of Appeal ruled that the defendant who wounded a woman by hitting her with a video recorder while sleepwalking, was insane under the M'Naghten rules. Lord Lane said, "We accept that sleep is a normal condition, but the evidence in the instant case indicates that sleepwalking, and particularly violence in sleep, is not normal."

Overall, this emphasis on control rather than consciousness is supported by clinical science. Michael Coles says:

... on the basis of the available knowledge of human behaviour, it may be suggested that many of the crimes the courts have decided were committed in an automatistic state – that is, in the absence of conscious, volitional control, or while the mind was a total blank – actually may have occurred in a state of diminished consciousness, with the diminished consciousness resulting in the diminished conscious control of behaviour. In other words, the individual becomes disinhibited, and behaviour that the individual would otherwise be able to [contain] gains expression.

== Insanity ==
A discussion of the relationship between automatism and insanity and "internal" and "external" factors is in M'Naghten rules. The internal-external divide is a doctrine of English law, but not followed in Canada for example - hence Parks' acquittal.

== Drunkenness ==
Voluntary intoxication is not automatism. Involuntary intoxication can constitute automatism. This was the decision in R. v Hardie [1985] 1 WLR 164, although this decision may have been the result of judicial misunderstanding of the effects of diazepam. However, in Kingston [1994] 3 WLR 519, a man with normally controlled paedophiliac urges succumbed to them after being drugged unknowingly for blackmail purposes; he was found still able to form the mens rea for indecent assault. This decision has been much criticised by jurists.

== Provocation ==
To constitute a provocation, there must be a sudden and unexpected loss of control as a result of things said or done but the accused is still capable of activity which is sufficiently directed to cause the death of another. Hence, there is insufficient loss of control to constitute automatism e.g. as in the Canadian case of Bert Thomas Stone v R (1999). Provocation is only a partial defence, a concession to human frailty, and not a complete defence like automatism.

== See also ==
- Sleep sex
- Highway hypnosis
- Twinkie defense

== Sources ==
- Beran, Roy. Automatism: Comparison of Common Law and Civil Law Approaches – A Search for the Optimal, (2002) 10 Journal of Law and Medicine, 61.
- Glass, H. H., Hypnosis and the Law, (1971) 3 Australian Journal of Forensic Science, 162-167
- Gould, Patricia E., Automatism: The Unconsciousness Defence to a Criminal Action, (1978) 15 San Diego Law Review, 839-858.
- Harding, Richard W., Sane and Insane Automatism in Australia: Some Dilemmas, Developments and Suggested Reforms, (1981) 4 International Journal of Law and Psychiatry, 73-87.
- Horder, Jeremy, Pleading Involuntary Lack of Capacity, (1993) 52(2) Cambridge Law Journal, 298-318.
- Kado, Ayako & Fisher, Larry R. Sleepwalking – Nightmare for the courts
- Martin, Lawrence, Can sleepwalking be a murder defense?
- Rosengren, Caroline, Mad or Bad: Criminal Responsibility and Mental Disorder (2004) University of Lund, Masters Thesis.
- Schopp, Robert F., Automatism, insanity, and the psychology of criminal responsibility. A philosophical inquiry, Cambridge, Cambridge University Press, 1991, ISBN 0-521-40150-X
- Tolmie, Julia, Alcoholism and Criminal Liability, (2001) 64(5) Modern Law Review, 688-709
- Yeo, Stanley, Situating Automatism in the Penal Codes of Malaysia and Singapore, LawAsia Journal 2003/2004
