= Torto =

Torto is a Portuguese surname. Notable people with the surname include:

- Baldwyn Torto (born 1955), Ghanaian scientist
- Daniel Torto (born 1960), Ghanaian Anglican bishop
- Frank Gibbs Torto (1921–1984), Ghanaian chemist and professor
- Jacob Ofori Torto (1906–?), Ghanaian public servant
- João Torto, Portuguese man, probably a legendary figure, who allegedly made an unsuccessful attempt at flight in 1540
- Robert Torto, Ghanaian hate criminal

== See also ==
- Noticia de Torto, minuta of a notarial document written Portuguese language
- Torto (disambiguation)
- Torta (disambiguation)
- Torti
