= Barry Williams (spree killer) =

British spree killer (1944–2014)

- Born: Barry Kenneth Williams; 1944
- Died: 24 December 2014 (aged 69 or 70); Merseyside, England
- Other name: Harry Street
- Known for: Spree killings of 5 people
- Criminal charges: Murder (1978); Possessing a prohibited firearm (2013); Putting a neighbour in fear of violence (2013); Making an improvised explosive device (2013)
- Criminal penalty: Indefinite detention under mental health legislation (twice)
- Criminal status: Detained in a high-security hospital, died while institutionalised

Barry Kenneth Williams (1944 – 24 December 2014), known since 1994 as Harry Street, was a British spree killer. A foundry worker who lived with his parents, he shot eight people in the English Midlands towns of West Bromwich and Nuneaton in little over an hour on 26 October 1978, killing five. Following a high-speed car chase, he was arrested and in 1979 was convicted of manslaughter on the grounds of diminished responsibility. He was detained in high-security hospitals under mental health legislation.

After being given a conditional release in 1994, he changed his name, moved to Wales, and married. In 2014, following allegations of harassment against his neighbours, he was convicted of further firearms offences. He was again ordered to be detained in a secure hospital, with little likelihood of release, and died in December 2014.

== Background ==
At the time of his first offence, Williams was an unmarried foundry worker. He lived at 14 Andrew Road on the Bustleholme Mill estate in West Bromwich, West Midlands, England with his elderly parents, Hilda and Horrace, who owned and ran a metal polishing business in Birmingham.

He held a valid firearms certificate, allowing him to possess a single semi-automatic weapon. He used this weapon at approved gun clubs for sports shooting at targets. His erratic behaviour, including shooting at dummies dressed in wigs, and modifying his bullets to make them more powerful, led to his being expelled from one club, in Telford, Shropshire. His nickname there had been "The Cowboy". Members of another gun club where Williams was a member had expressed concerns that he was stealing bullets.

During the mid 1970s, he had been involved in a number of disputes with his neighbours, the Burkitt family, of 16 Andrew Road, alleging that the noise of their television and record player disturbed him and his parents. This became an obsession, and he suffered the delusion that his neighbours were mocking him. On one occasion, during a row about noise, he told Philip Burkitt, "I'm going to exterminate you".

== West Bromwich and Nuneaton shootings ==
West Bromwich and Nuneaton shootings
- Location: West Bromwich; Wednesbury; Nuneaton
- Date: 26 – 27 October 1978 c. 7:00 p.m. – c. 10:30 a.m. (GMT)
- Weapons: 9mm Smith & Wesson semi-automatic pistol; .22-calibre pistol; several improvised explosive devices (unused)
- Deaths: 5 (3 in West Bromwich, 2 in Nuneaton)
- Injuries: 4 (3 by gunfire)
- Perpetrator: Barry Kenneth Williams
- Motive: schizophrenia

On the evening of 26 October 1978, about a week after the extermination threat, George Burkitt and his 20-year-old son Philip were working on Philip's Triumph Spitfire car (bearing the registration WHA 370H) in front of their house. At around 7 p.m, annoyed by the noise they were making, Williams shot them both with a 9mm Smith & Wesson semi-automatic pistol. George died where he fell and Philip, wounded, ran into the house. Williams followed him, shooting him again and killing him. He then shot and killed George's wife, Iris. The Burkitts' 17-year-old daughter, Jill, was hit four times in the back and once in the thigh, but survived. Two other neighbours, a married couple who had witnessed the attack on the Burkitts, also survived being shot. The injured were treated at Birmingham General Hospital.

After discharging a total of 23 rounds, Williams fled the scene by car, firing a further six shots from a second, .22-calibre pistol as he did so. In Stanhurst Way he shot at two boys, aged 10 and 11, who were playing football, and at a woman, but missed them all. Passing through Wednesbury, he shot through the windows of a barber's shop and two houses. In one of these, a nine-year-old girl was hurt by flying glass. He stopped for petrol in Walsall and drove off without paying.

At around 8:10 p.m, Williams shot and killed another married couple, Michel and Lisa Di Maria, after stopping to use the petrol filling station which they ran, Arbury Road Service Station, in Stockingford, Nuneaton, Warwickshire, some 20 miles (32 km) from his home. Lisa was killed immediately, and Michel died later in hospital.

Williams slept rough in some woodland, and was arrested the next morning, in Spring Gardens, Buxton, after a 30-mile (48 km) car chase at high speed, starting on the Derbyshire moors. After his car was involved in a collision, he pulled a gun and attempted to hijack one of the police cars which had been following him. He was overpowered without firing his gun by the unarmed officers who had been pursuing him. He later said he had wanted the police to shoot him. Police found 147 9mm and 770 .22 rounds in his car, along with the .22 calibre pistol which had a full magazine, and several home-made bombs.

=== Legal proceedings ===
He was subsequently charged with five counts of murder. Two counts of attempted murder were ordered to lie on file.

In March 1979 at Stafford Crown Court he pleaded not guilty to murder but instead pleaded guilty to manslaughter on the grounds of diminished responsibility. The plea was accepted by the prosecution, after psychiatrists gave evidence that he had an active paranoid psychosis. His indefinite detention was ordered by the trial judge, Mr Justice Stephen Brown, and he was held in Broadmoor Hospital and at Ashworth Hospital, both high security units.

His parents described him as "a quiet boy" and said they had "no idea" of what he had been preparing to do.

== Release ==
Williams, who had schizophrenia, was released from hospital in 1994 once doctors and a mental health tribunal decided that he was no longer a risk to the public. This was on condition that he could be detained again if his behaviour warranted it. A Birmingham and Solihull Mental Health NHS Foundation Trust spokesman said in 2014, "Harry Street was released on a conditional discharge, subject to specific conditions, in 1993 [sic] by a Mental Health Tribunal, an independent judicial body, after careful consideration of the medical evidence presented to them."

On release, he changed his name to Harry Street and initially was allowed to live in a bail hostel around 6 miles (9.7 km) from Andrew Road, resulting in complaints from the MP for the latter area, Peter Snape, on behalf of several concerned constituents, to the Home Secretary, Michael Howard. Williams subsequently moved to Wales. He married in 1996 and a child was born later that year. The family moved to Hazelville Road, Hall Green, Birmingham, in 2005.

== 2013 incident ==
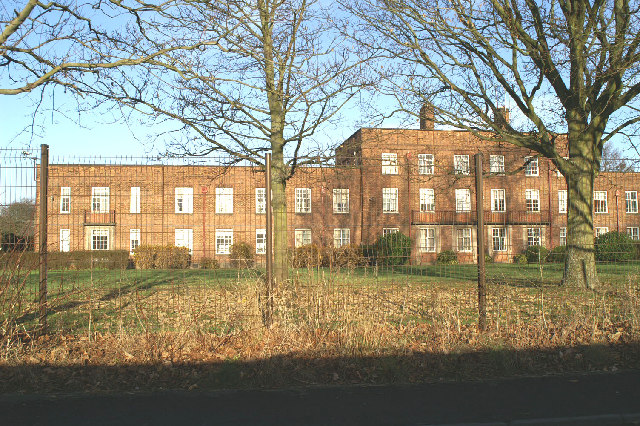
Ashworth Hospital, seen in 2005

In October 2013, allegations arose that he had waged a campaign of harassment against his next-door neighbour. Williams's home was searched by West Midlands Police as part of their investigation, and he was found to be in possession of an improvised bomb, 50 homemade bullets, a revolver and two pistols. The bomb squad was called in to make the explosive device safe. This was featured in the Channel 5 documentary series The Nightmare Neighbour Next Door.

At Birmingham Crown Court in October 2014, he pleaded guilty to three charges of possessing a prohibited firearm, to putting a neighbour in fear of violence, and to making an improvised explosive device. He was again ordered to be detained indefinitely, this time under sections 37 and 41 of the Mental Health Act 1983, by Mr Justice Blair, who said that "The effect of these orders is that the defendant may never be released". He also likened Williams's more recent behaviour to that leading up to the 1978 incident and said that "a similar tragedy had been narrowly averted". Williams was returned to Ashworth Hospital, where he was already being treated on recall from his previous detention.

West Midlands Police announced after the trial concluded that a Multi-Agency Public Protection Arrangements serious case review would be held. A spokesman for the police said, "There was no trace of Harry Street on any police systems; but it is thanks to the tenacity of a local police officer who, when the harassment escalated, made extensive checks which led her to Street's GP and his true identity."

He died on 24 December 2014, aged reportedly 70, in a Merseyside hospital from a suspected heart attack that he had suffered at Ashworth.
