= Murder of Carrie Brown =

American prostitute

Carrie Brown
- Born: Caroline Montgomery c. 1834
- Died: April 24, 1891 (aged 56–57); New York City, US
- Cause of death: Strangulation
- Other names: "Shakespeare", Jeff Davis
- Occupation: Prostitute
- Known for: Alleged victim of Jack the Ripper

Carrie Brown (c. 1834 – April 24, 1891) was a New York City prostitute who was murdered and mutilated in a lodging house. She is occasionally mentioned as an alleged victim of Jack the Ripper. Although known to use numerous aliases, a common practice in her occupation, she supposedly won her nickname of Shakespeare for her habit of quoting William Shakespeare during drinking games. She has often been referred to as Old Shakespeare in later news articles and books and contemporaneous newspapers.

== The murder ==
The badly mutilated body of Brown, a longtime Bowery prostitute, was found in a room in a squalid lodging house known as the East River Hotel on April 24, 1891.

Newspapers were quick to report the murder as proof of the alleged arrival in America of Jack the Ripper, whose murders of prostitutes in London's Whitechapel district were well known during the time. News of the possibility that Jack the Ripper had arrived in New York City posed a challenge to NYPD Chief Inspector Thomas Byrnes, who had criticized Scotland Yard for its inability to capture Jack the Ripper.

== Suspect and trial ==
As the murder of Brown was soon becoming one of the most publicized in the city's history, pressure was on Byrnes to solve the murder as quickly as possible, and an Algerian named Ameer Ben Ali (who also went by "Frenchy" or "Frenchy No. 1") was arrested for the murder soon after. However, evidence against Ben Ali was largely circumstantial and based primarily on the claim that unidentified bloodstains had been found leading from the room where Brown was killed into the room he was staying in. Reporters who had been at the scene of the crime said that no such bloodstains were actually there.

On July 3, 1891, Ben Ali was convicted of second degree murder, and sentenced to life imprisonment, despite his claims of innocence.

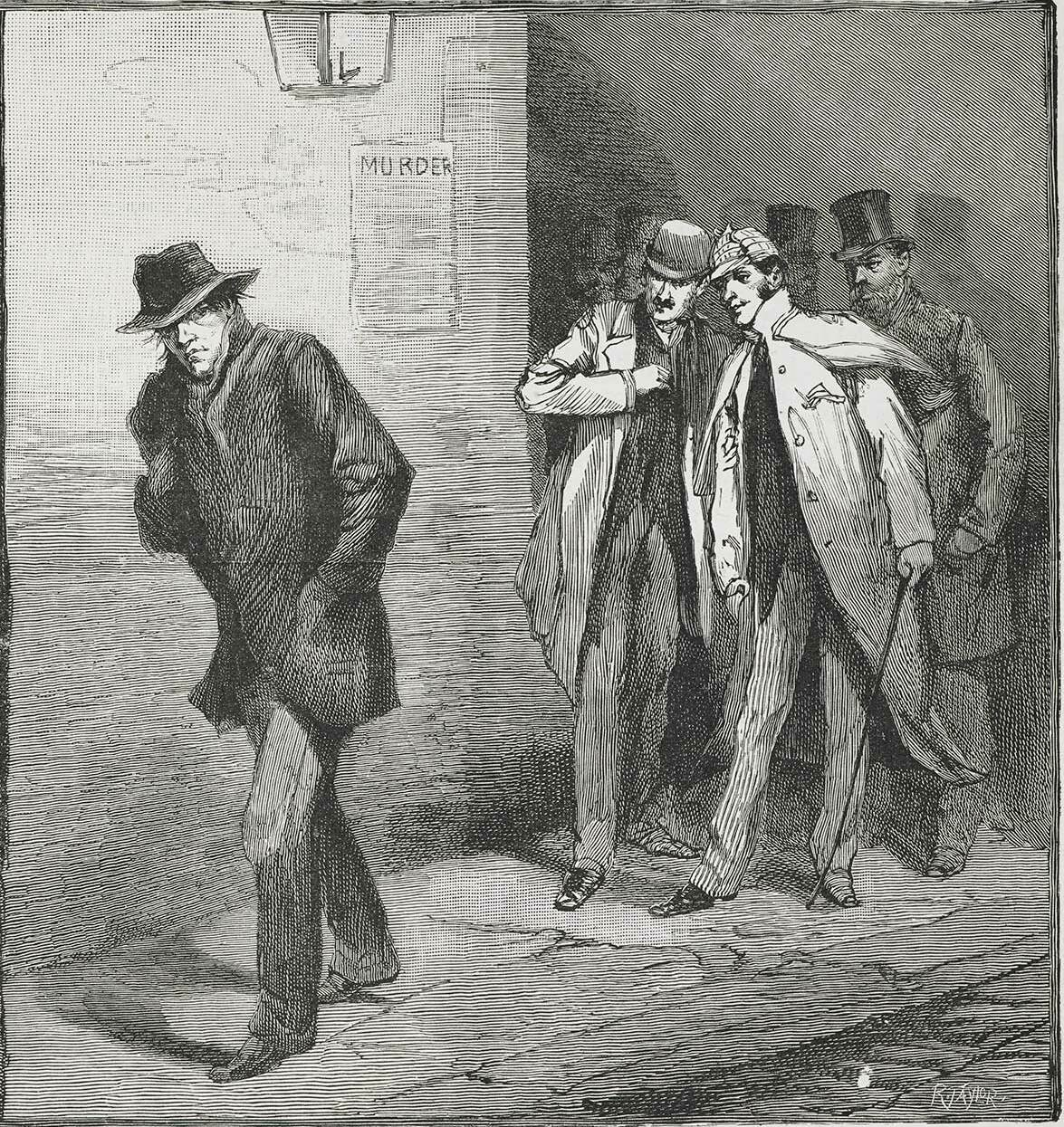
Illustration of Jack the Ripper

== Other theories ==
A group of reformers pointed out instances of police misconduct in the investigation and evidence to support Ben Ali's innocence. The group was able to prove the NYPD had made no attempt to find the missing key to the locked room or the unidentified man who witnesses claimed she had last been seen with the night before. Years later it was claimed that a man in a New Jersey farm had found the missing key to Room 31 and a bloody shirt in a bureau drawer of a room he had rented out to a man who had disappeared shortly after the murder. Faced with this testimony, coupled with the longstanding belief of many for years that Ben Ali had been set up and the fact that Byrnes had been removed from office for corruption, Ben Ali was released after serving 11 years and left for his native Algeria shortly afterwards.

No substantial evidence has proven that Jack the Ripper was responsible and the case remains unsolved. It has been stated by writer Philip Sugden that if the murder was committed by Jack the Ripper, one possible culprit could be George Chapman, a Ripper suspect who moved from London to the US around this time, although recent research suggests that he only moved to the US after this murder. Another possibility suggested by writer James Tully is James Kelly, a Ripper suspect who murdered his wife by slashing her throat and was committed to Broadmoor Insane Asylum, which he escaped from just prior to the Ripper murders. He may have traveled to New York after the Ripper murders in London stopped.

A book by Howard and Nina Brown, East Side Story: 1891 Murder Case of Carrie Brown, presents evidence that the 'Danish Farmhand' story presented by New Jersey businessman George Damon in 1901 was false based on the latter's own words within a previously unseen affidavit submitted on July 2, 1901, in Manhattan.

Howard & Nina Brown's An Illustrated Encyclopedia: The Murder Of Carrie Brown is a comprehensive A to Z of the case, featuring over 200 entries on persons involved in the Brown murder case.

Howard & Nina Brown's 'Once A Happy Bride': The Tragic Life of Carrie Brown- From Liverpool To The Lower East Side, is the first chronological examination of Carrie Brown's life, from her arrival in New York in the 1840s to her death in April 1891.

Howard & Nina Brown's " Was Justice Served? A Second Look At The Decision To Release 'Frenchy' In 1902" offers a critical view on the commutation of Amer Ben Ali's life sentence and his eventual release in April 1902.

== In popular culture ==
- The death of Brown and the murder's supposed ties to Jack the Ripper were used in writer Heather Graham's Sacred Evil.
