= Gregory Davis =

British murderer

- Born: 1979 (age 46–47)
- Status: Released

Details
- Date: 28 January 2003
- Locations: Stantonbury, Buckinghamshire, England
- Killed: 2
- Injured: 1

Gregory Davis (born 1979) is an English spree killer and former art student who was convicted of the double manslaughter of Dorothy Rogers and her son Michael Rogers in 2003. He was released in 2011 from Littlemore Hospital.

== Early life ==
Gregory Davis was born to a family residing in Great Linford, Buckinghamshire, England as the son of a civil engineer and a care assistant. He attended secondary school at The Radcliffe School.

== Art studies ==
Davis first studied art during his sixth form, and later at Northampton University. One of his works of art made during this period consisted of a trophy plaque bearing the names of his favourite serial killers.

== Murders ==
Davis himself planned to be a serial killer and used his diary to plot to murder. Progressing on a diary entry that spoke of a desire to kill ad infinitum "all over the world," he eventually went on a murder spree on 28 January 2003. Working his way through a compiled hit list, he first visited Stewart Johnson who escaped as kitchen fitters were working in his home. Davis then continued down the list to Stantonbury, to the home of Dorothy Rogers.

== Victims ==
- Dorothy Rogers, a 48-year-old divorcee, was stabbed 31 times at her home in Stantonbury.
- Michael Rogers, aged 19, was stabbed, bludgeoned and disembowelled at a children's playground.
- Mick Cowles was attacked with a hammer and seriously wounded.

== Trial and imprisonment ==
On 15 December 2003, Davis stood trial at Luton Crown Court and pleaded guilty to manslaughter on the grounds of diminished responsibility. Mr Justice Richard Aikens accepted the plea after a team of five psychiatrists diagnosed him with major depressive disorder, social anxiety disorder, alcohol dependence and to be suffering from a psychotic episode at the time of the crime. He was given an indefinite sentence to be served at Broadmoor Hospital. In 2009, he was transferred to Littlemore Hospital where he was allowed out on short release.

A Mental Health Review Tribunal decided he would be released in July 2011.
