= Killing of Palmira Silva =

2014 beheading in Edmonton, London

- Undated image of Silva
- Location: Nightingale Road; Edmonton, London, England
- Date: 4 September 2014 c. 13:00 (WET)
- Weapons: Knife, broom handle
- Victims: Palmira Silva, 82
- Perpetrator: Nicholas Salvador
- Verdict: Not criminally responsible

On 4 September 2014, 82-year-old Palmira Silva was beheaded in her back garden in Edmonton, London, by 25-year-old Nicholas Salvador. Friends of Salvador had recently noticed odd behaviour by him, including drug and alcohol abuse and an obsession with videos of beheadings.

Psychiatrists found evidence that Salvador had paranoid schizophrenia. On 23 June 2015, he was found not guilty of murder on basis of insanity, and was detained indefinitely in a psychiatric hospital.

== Victim ==
Palmira Silva, aged 82, emigrated to London in the 1950s from Avellino, Italy, with her husband Domenico, and was a widow. She was the proprietor of a café, and a great-grandmother with two children, six grandchildren and a great-grandchild. Her daughter, Celestina, claimed that her mother wished to stay in Edmonton although "the area was changing".

Silva's funeral was held on 24 September. Her granddaughter Christina ran the 2015 London Marathon to raise money for Victim Support.

== Attack ==
Two hours before the killing, Salvador ate at a café and left without paying. A staff member, who followed him out and successfully got him to pay, noted that "he seemed a bit depressed or upset about something".

At his residence, provided by the Thorne siblings, Salvador stole a knife and a broomstick. Bianca Thorne found Salvador in the process of cutting up her pet cat in the garden, telling her that the cat was a demon and that nobody loved him. She and her brother Darius locked themselves in a car and before they drove off, Salvador smashed the windows and hit Bianca Thorne in the shoulder with the broomstick.

Shirtless, Salvador damaged the property of several neighbours, knocking down fences and beheading another cat. After climbing over the backyard fences of several houses, Salvador was addressed by Silva, who was tending to flowers in her garden. After a brief exchange, during which Salvador gestured at the knife in his hand, Salvador vaulted over Silva's fence and attacked her as she was walking away from him. Silva was bludgeoned in the head and shoulder and while she was on the ground, Salvador repeatedly stabbed Silva in the back. Salvador, having noticed a police helicopter in the sky, made repeated gestures towards Silva's body before beheading her, maintaining eye contact with the helicopter. After briefly holding up both the knife and Silva's head towards the helicopter, Salvador discarded the knife and left Silva's remains in her garden.

Bianca Davis' police call was made at 13:07, but officers only arrived thirty minutes later. Police led away children in the area, and an officer gave the order "He's agitated and lethal... he needs taking out". Police reached Salvador after he broke into a house, with the family inside evacuated by officers. Police confronted Salvador as he tried to ram an upstairs door. Salvador bit an officer in the shin and showed little reaction to the officers' force, which included six taser shots, baton strikes, and pistol-whipping, as well as several kicks and punches. He was ultimately overpowered, handcuffed, and restrained by being rolled into a carpet. As he was carried away to a police vehicle, Salvador repeatedly shouted "Allah", "Red is the colour" and "I am the king". The attack lasted for 45 minutes.

== Perpetrator ==
Nicholas Salvador, aged 25 at the time of the killing, was staying with friends three doors from Silva's house. He was born in London to Nigerian parents, though the London Evening Standard reported that he had moved from Nigeria at age 13 or 14. His parents divorced early in his childhood, which he spent mostly in Nigeria with a grandmother. After finishing a college course in media, he had spells as manual labourer, losing his job as a billboard paster three days before the killing due to concerns surrounding his behaviour. He was active in cage fighting, and known as "Fat Nick" for his stature.

Acquaintances said that he had issues with drug and alcohol abuse, and was a drug dealer. His friends told the police that Salvador used cocaine and skunk cannabis, and would drink a bottle of whisky or brandy per day. Contacts also revealed that he was obsessed with watching videos of beheadings and searching the Internet for Jihadist material. He was also obsessed with the idea of shapeshifters.

=== Religion controversy ===
According to different witnesses, Salvador is either from a Muslim background, or a convert to the religion five years beforehand. His former employer, who claimed Salvador to be a convert, said that he never discussed religion or politics. According to others, Salvador converted from Islam to Buddhism in 2014.

Public speculation linked the killing to the recent beheadings of American journalists James Foley and Steven Sotloff by the Islamic State of Iraq and the Levant. The day following the killing, tabloid The Sun ran the front-page headline "'Muslim convert' beheads woman in garden", which received a mixed reception from the public due to the conflicting accounts of Salvador's beliefs or motive. Head of PR Dylan Sharpe defended his newspaper's printing of the headline, on the basis that other publications were also reporting on the killing with similar headlines.

== Trial ==
Following Salvador's arrest, the Metropolitan Police reacted to speculation by stating that there were no links to terrorism. He was sent to Broadmoor Hospital, where psychiatrists found him to have paranoid schizophrenia. Salvador believed Silva to be a reincarnation of Adolf Hitler or a shapeshifting demon, and admitted to her killing.

He was tried at the Old Bailey, where a 14-minute recording of the preceding vandalism was shown. On medical reports, he was found not guilty of murder by reason of insanity, but ordered to remain indefinitely in Broadmoor. The judge, Recorder of London Nicholas Hilliard, concluded:

It is established beyond any doubt that you killed Mrs Silva in an attack of extraordinary brutality and ferocity. You thought you were encountering some demonic force which had taken on a human form. You could not have been more deluded. Nobody who saw it could forget the mild and trusting way Mrs Silva approached you over the wall while you were brandishing a knife. This gentle, intelligent 82-year-old lady should have been able to live her life in peace and with security, proud in the achievements of others, but that was not to be.
