= The Radcliffe School =

Comprehensive school in Wolverton, Milton Keynes, England

Location
- Aylesbury Street West; Wolverton, Milton Keynes, MK12 5BT; England
- Coordinates: 52°03′30″N 0°49′22″W

Information
- Type: Foundation school
- Motto: "Inspire and Achieve"
- Local authority: Borough of Milton Keynes
- Department for Education URN: 110532 Tables
- Ofsted: Reports
- Headteacher: Paula Lawson
- Gender: Coeducational
- Age: 11 to 18
- Houses: William Cowper, Edward Hayes, Jennie Lee, James McConnell
- Colours: Navy and Sky Blue Green (Cowper), Blue (Hayes), Yellow (Lee), Red (McConnell)
- Website: radcliffeschool.org.uk

The Radcliffe School is a comprehensive school located in Wolverton, Milton Keynes, England.

The school offers General Certificates of Secondary Education (GCSEs), Business and Technology Education Council vocational qualifications (BTEC), Youth Awards and Entry Level Certificates as programmes of study for pupils. The Radcliffe School also operates a sixth form, with courses offered including A-Levels, BTECs and diplomas.

== History ==
The Radcliffe School was built in 1956 as a Grammar School, before becoming a Comprehensive school in 1969. The west wing of the school was planned around a central courtyard, which contained laboratories, history and geography rooms and sixth form division rooms.

In the centre of the courtyard, a biology pool was installed and at one end of the pool a memorial was built. This honours former pupils who were killed in the two world wars. The bronze plaques that list the former students were transferred from the hall of the old school and added to the memorial.

Pupils from the school appeared in an ITV quiz show "Chatterbox" broadcast 5 July 1977. Their opponents were The Cedars School of Bedfordshire.

== Inspections ==
In its September 2017 report, the Office for Standards in Education, Children's Services and Skills rated the school as "requires improvement". Teaching, learning and pupils outcomes were all rated as "requires improvement". This assessment was unchanged from its November 2015 report.

In January 2020 Ofsted rated the school as "Good".

In 2015 53 per cent of pupils got 5 GCSEs including English and maths. The figure for "disadvantaged students" figure was 39 per cent. The Progress 8 figure for 2016 was -0.34 which is below the national average, and the provisional progress 8 figure for 2017 is -0.3 which is again below average.

The March 2025 Ofsted report rated the school's quality of teaching as "Requires improvement".

== Notable former pupils ==
- Dele Alli, footballer
- Gregory Davis, murderer
- Simon Munn, wheelchair basketball player
- Fallon Sherrock, darts player
