= Campaign for John Hunt =

Irish citizen (born 1981)

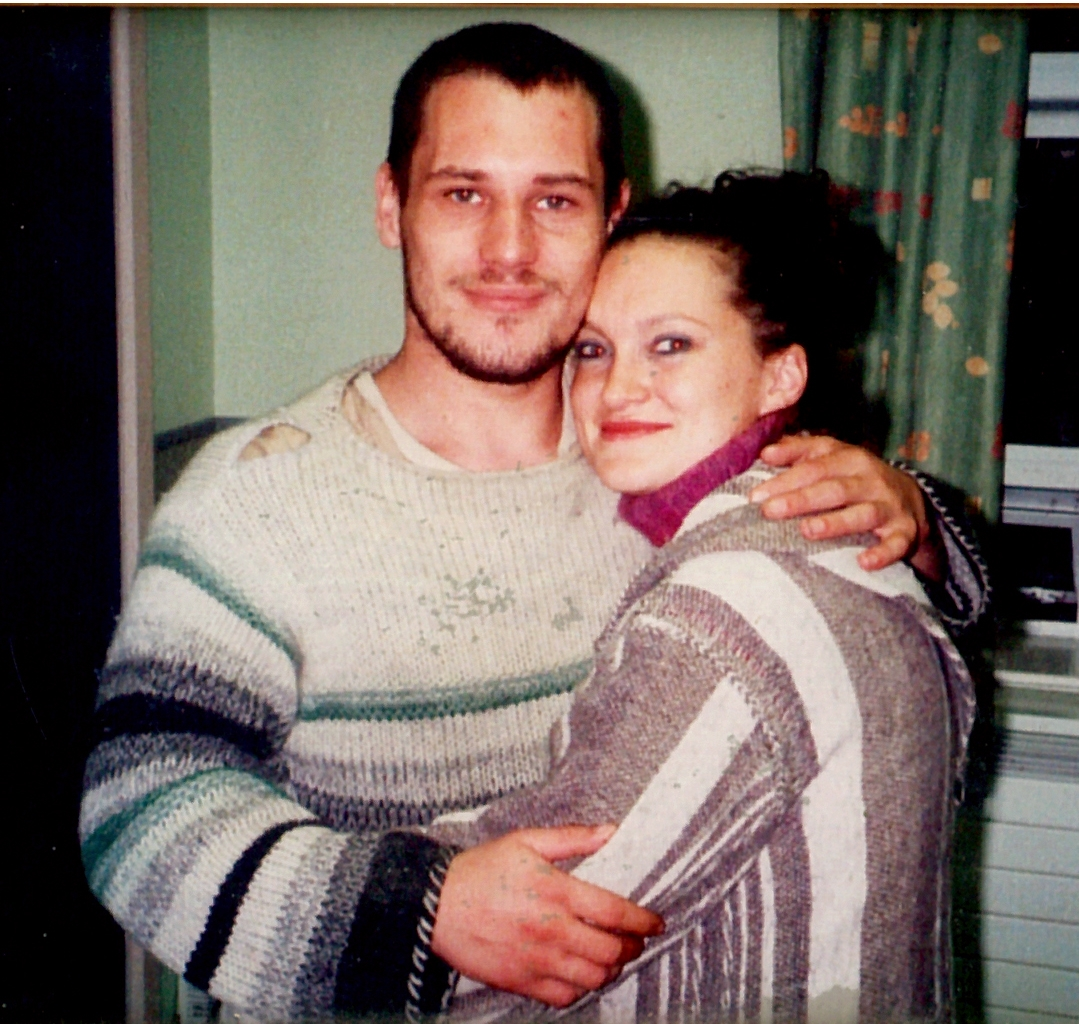
John Hunt and Gráinne Humphrys

John Hunt (born 16 July 1981) is an Irish citizen who was involuntarily detained as a psychiatric patient. The conditions of Hunt's detention have been the subject of a sustained campaign by his former partner and mother of his child Gráinne Humphrys. He was committed as an involuntary psychiatric patient in 2005 and was detained at a secure psychiatric unit at Our Lady's Hospital in Cork until August 2011 when he was transferred to the Central Mental Hospital, Dundrum, Dublin. Until 2010 he was not granted leave for any temporary release from the Cork facility to visit his family. As a result of the campaign of his former partner that year, the Cork hospital allowed Hunt six hours of unsupervised leave every two weeks. Later, following a violent altercation with a psychiatric nurse, this leave was rescinded, and Hunt was transferred to the main Irish forensic psychiatric unit in Dundrum.

As of 2013, Humphrys is still being quoted in the Irish press about Hunt's apparently ongoing psychiatric detention: "I am very critical about how his admission was dealt with – it was with the use of force and coercion. He didn't want to take the medication at the time of his admission and I thought, fair enough. I couldn't understand why there was not a better method of communication that we could use with him, like open dialogue."

== Early life ==
At the time of Hunt's birth, his family lived in the small, coastal town of Greystones in Wicklow, Ireland. His father was a violent alcoholic and his mother had few supports in raising her children. His four-year-old brother drowned when he was eleven years old. Thereafter, Hunt began getting into fights and taking drugs. Humphrys attributes these behaviours to his history of trauma and low self-esteem. His first breakdown occurred shortly after the end of his relationship with his first long-term girlfriend. Humphrys has expressed the view in relation to Hunt's history that, "trauma and loss, amongst other factors, form the bedrock of John's problems — his so-called attachment disorder and paranoid schizophrenia."

== Involuntary committal and medication ==
John Hunt was a resident of Cork, Ireland. He experienced a breakdown while his then partner, Gráinne Humphrys, was pregnant with their child, Joshua. Frightened for his safety, Hunt's mother, Marion Hunt, instigated committal proceedings against her son. As he was deemed a danger to himself, this led to his involuntary committal in 2006 at the Carrig Mór Centre, a Psychiatric Intensive Care Unit (PICU) in Shanakiel, Cork. The Carraig Mór Centre is a two-storey building that was formerly part of the now defunct Our Lady's Hospital (Cork District Mental Hospital). Hunt was under the management of a forensic psychiatric team in an 18-bed unit for involuntary patients deemed to have behavioural difficulties arising from their mental condition. Subsequent to his admission, he received a variety of diagnoses including drug-induced psychosis, bipolar disorder and schizophrenia. Family visits at Carraig Mór were carried out in a small CCTV-monitored room at the facility that has been described as "cramped" and "uninviting".

Since his committal Hunt has been forcibly medicated with a diverse range of psychoactive drugs including the typical antipsychotics zuclopenthixol and chlorpromazine, the atypical antipsychotic amisulpride, benzodiazepines and sleeping tablets. They have had various adverse side effects and Humphrys expressed the view that he was "completely over-medicated". The hospital authorities at Carraig Mór considered Hunt a 'chronic' patient and 'suitable' for long-term hospitalisation.

== Campaign ==
In 2007, Humphrys began a campaign seeking to end 'The Incarceration of John'. The Irish Examiner has noted that she gained substantial attention to his case, powerfully portraying him as a lost soul imprisoned against his will and cut off from his family.

In the summer of 2010 former Green Party Senator, Dan Boyle, visited Hunt at the Carraig Mór facility. Senator Boyle acknowledged that Hunt was 'physically cared for' but expressed concern 'about the overriding culture of excessive medication there'. He also noted that Hunt 'was only allowed minimum contact with the outside world' and that he did not have access to a rehabilitation programme. Humphrys argues that Hunt's treatment at the facility damaged him mentally and physically and she has characterised the mental health system as punitive and fostering dependency in patients. She has also alleged that her former partner suffered in the facility as he has been perceived as non-compliant.

Three days after Senator Boyle's visit to Hunt he called for a debate in the Seanad on 'the culture of mental health and psychiatric care services' in Ireland. In his address Senator Boyle referred to his visit to the Cork psychiatric hospital and the fact that Hunt had only seen his son outside of that institution once in the previous four years.

Later in 2010, following the campaign's expanded media presence and Senator Boyle's visit to Carraig Mór, Hunt was granted day release without supervision. Hunt was allowed a six-hour pass every two weeks and, according to Humphrys, this reconnection with the world outside of the secure psychiatric hospital gave him 'new hope for his future'. Reflecting on Hunt's experience of the mental health system as a patient and her own as the partner and advocate of a psychiatric patient, Humphrys wrote to the medical authorities of the Carraig Mór Centre in early 2011 outlining her grievances, which was reproduced in the press.

== Transfer to the Central Mental Hospital ==
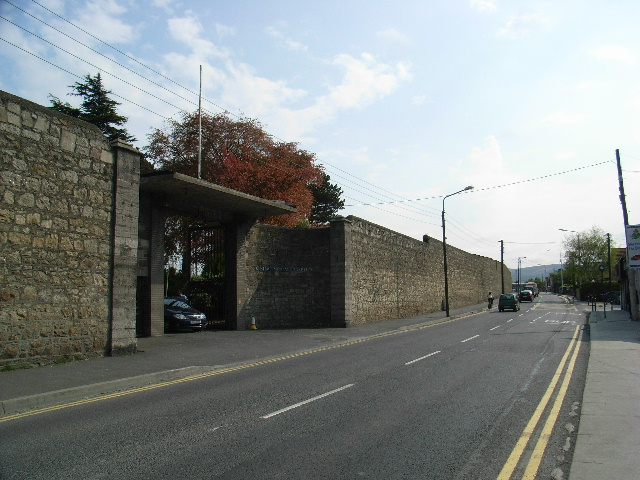
Dundrum Road entrance to the Central Mental Hospital, Dundrum, Dublin

Hunt's fortnightly passes were rescinded following an incident in June 2011 when he struck a male member of staff. The authorities at the Carraig Mór Centre also barred all visits to Hunt by non-family members. The context and causes of the incident, surrounding an attempted phonecall to his son, and whether it was properly investigated, were highlighted and contested by his family. The authorities at Carraig Mór reported the incident to the Gardaí (the Irish police force) and also sent a report to the Mental Health Commission, who directed that the incident should be addressed by a Mental Health Tribunal. His family and solicitor were not allowed to attend and were not consulted. The tribunal ruled that Hunt should be transferred to the Central Mental Hospital, Dundrum, the main forensic psychiatric facility in Ireland.

The Irish Health Service Executive has responded that it is the goal of the mental health services to "work in a collaborative way with patients and their families to ensure the best outcome possible for people who need mental health services". They also stated that, "All patients detained under the Mental Health Act have access to independent legal advice. Their detention under the mental health act is reviewed at regular intervals by an independent mental health review tribunal. This tribunal has the power to end the patient's detention".

Prior to his transfer Humphreys stated that she and Hunt's family were apprehensive about the plan to relocate him but that they remained hopeful that better rehabilitative services would be available to him in Dundrum than were accessible at Carraig Mór; she said Hunt was very worried about it but also it may be something new, though he was concerned he would never be released. John McCarthy, a mental health campaigner and the founder of Mad Pride Ireland, likened the facilities of John's detention as a form of "jail" where patients were held with "no judge, jury or release date".

== See also ==
- Long-term effects of benzodiazepines
- Involuntary commitment
- AH v West London Mental Health Trust
