= William Orange (physician) =

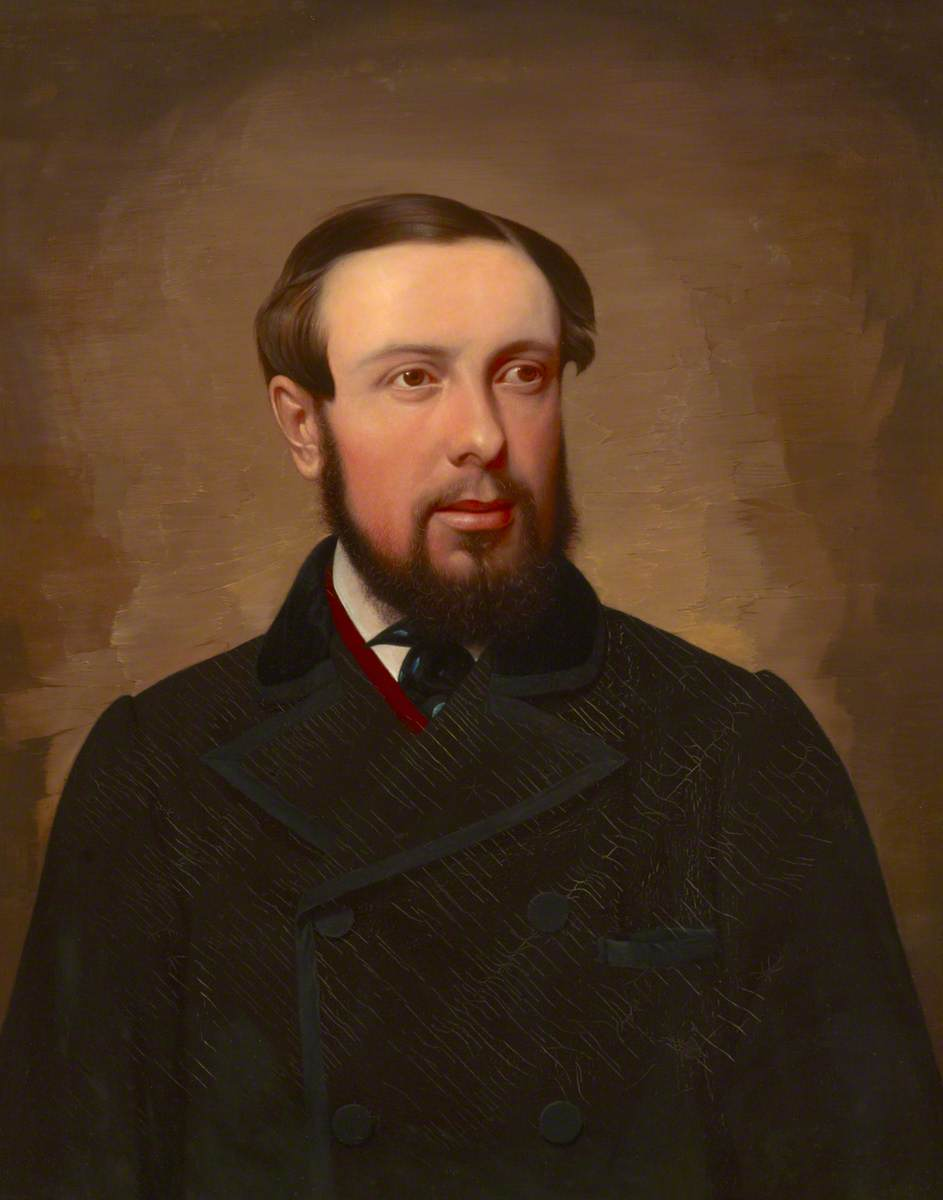
Dr William Orange

William Orange (24 October 1833 – 31 December 1916) was an English physician and medical superintendent of Broadmoor Criminal Lunatic Asylum.

He was born in Torquay where his Huguenot-descended father John was an Independent Baptist minister. After an apprenticeship to a physician in Berkshire, he qualified from St Thomas's Hospital in 1856 before accompanying a patient on a long tour of Europe. That trip enabled him to learn Italian, German and French and to gain his medical doctorate from the University of Heidelberg before taking up his first official post in the Surrey County Lunatic Asylum.

He was appointed deputy superintendent of Broadmoor Criminal Lunatic Asylum in 1862 and succeeded John Meyer as superintendent in 1870. He also acted as a medical advisor to the Home Office on the sanity of criminals condemned to death, such as Christiana Edmunds. In 1872 he married Florence Elizabeth Hart, with whom he had four daughters and a son. He became a fellow of the Royal College of Physicians in 1878.

In 1882, Orange was subjected to a violent attack by a patient, Henry Dodwell, a clergyman who had been admitted to Broadmoor in 1878 after being found not guilty by reason of insanity of assaulting Sir George Jessel. The attack left Orange with a head injury, from which he never fully recovered. He took eight months' sick leave immediately afterwards and early retirement in 1886.

Orange was president of the Medico-Psychological Society 1883–1884, giving an address on the law and insanity. On his retirement he received recognition as a Companion of the Bath. He contributed articles to Tuke's Dictionary of Psychological Medicine, which was published in 1892. From 1892 to 1904 he was on Broadmoor's Council of Supervision. He died in Bexhill-on-Sea.
