= James Kelly (murderer) =

English murderer and Jack the Ripper suspect

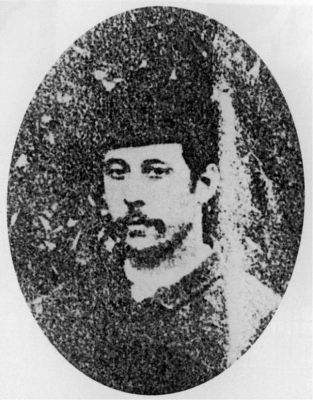
- Undated photograph of Kelly
- Born: 20 April 1860; Preston, Lancashire, England
- Died: 17 September 1929 (aged 69); Broadmoor Hospital, Berkshire, England
- Occupation: Upholsterer
- Spouse: Sarah Brider
- Conviction: Murder
- Penalty: Death by hanging; commuted to indefinite confinement in a psychiatric hospital

James Kelly (20 April 1860 – 17 September 1929) was an English upholsterer and convicted murderer. Kelly had been confined to Broadmoor Psychiatric Hospital in 1883 for the murder of his wife, Sarah Brider. In January 1888, he managed to escape from Broadmoor and was entirely unaccounted for until his voluntary return to the hospital almost 40 years later in 1927. Due to his escape having been a few months before the unsolved murders in Whitechapel, Kelly is one of many suspected of being Jack the Ripper. He was first identified as a suspect in Terence Sharkey's Jack the Ripper: 100 Years of Investigation (1987), with his case described in more detail in the book Prisoner 1167: The madman who was Jack the Ripper (1997), written by Jim Tully. In 2010, Discovery Channel broadcast a documentary called Jack the Ripper in America, in which retired NYPD cold case detective Ed Norris investigates the case. Norris claims that James Kelly is not only Jack the Ripper's true identity, but that he is also responsible for a number of 'Ripper-like' murders in the United States.

== Biography ==
James Kelly was born on 20 April 1860 in Preston as the son of Sarah Kelly, who left the infant in the care of his grandmother Therese. Although disregarded by his mother, James was bequeathed £20,000 to be administered by a fiduciary service, which he could use on reaching the age of 25.

In 1878, the 18-year-old Kelly began working as an upholsterer, under the service of several successive employers. At 20, he met 18-year-old Sarah Brider, a demure and young, but hard-working, woman from a Catholic family. The two entered into a relationship, with Kelly being well received by Brider's parents, who initially believed him to be a good-mannered, religious man. They both moved into Brider's parents' house.

Kelly started to develop an increasingly unpredictable and explosive temper, which eventually caused him to lose his job. Days later, on 4 June 1883, he married his girlfriend in a religious ceremony held in the St Luke parish. The marriage was troubled, with Kelly scolding his wife frequently and displaying obsessive jealousy, accusing her of various infidelities. Among other claims, Kelly believed that she had a sexually transmitted infection.

On 21 June 1883, seventeen days after marrying, Kelly slashed his wife's throat with a knife during a violent argument. Kelly was arrested without any resistance. Three days after the attack, Sarah Brider died from her injury. The following day, Kelly was charged with aggravated homicide, after the first coroner found him to be mentally fit for trial. In spite of appeals from lawyers and petitions for clemency, Kelly was sentenced to death by hanging, with the execution set for 20 August 1883. However, on 7 August, Dr. W. Orange, superintendent of the Broadmoor Hospital, examined Kelly and declared him insane. The statements of his former boss, Mr. Hiron, provided details about the abnormal attitude of his former employee, contributing to commutation of the death sentence. As a result, Kelly was sentenced to be confined to the asylum indefinitely.

For five years, Kelly was regarded as a model inmate. On 23 January 1888, he escaped from Broadmoor, using a key he fabricated himself by modelling a piece of metal. A fugitive arrest warrant to return him to the hospital was distributed. On 10 November 1888, the day following Mary Jane Kelly's murder, police searched the house of Sarah Brider's parents, which was James Kelly's last home address before his sentencing, but he was not there.

For the next decades, Kelly remained at large, until 12 February 1927, when he unexpectedly turned himself in at Broadmoor, the same asylum he escaped from 39 years earlier. Kelly begged to be re-admitted, stating, according to a local newspaper: "I am very tired and I want to die with my friends".

Following his return, Kelly lived at the hospital for the remaining two years of his life. On 17 September 1929, he died of double lobular pneumonia, as recorded on his death certificate.

== Suspicions and investigations ==
During the last two years of his life, Kelly wrote memoirs that police investigator Ed Norris accessed while making a Discovery Channel documentary. In his memoirs, Kelly does not directly confess to being Jack the Ripper, but does express a hatred of prostitutes. In addition, in his own personal diary he acknowledges that he had hidden in London between the months of August and November 1888, that is from the beginning until the end of the murders.

A study conducted for the documentary called "Jack the Ripper in America" makes the claim that James Kelly is Jack the Ripper's true identity. The main suspicion falls on him for being considered a psychotic murderer who escaped Broadmoor in England and later traveled after the cessation of the murders to North America.

The indications that in this case attract suspicion lay in the fact that, while being on American soil, there were a number of murders on prostitutes with the same characteristics as those in London. In turn, in a letter addressed to a newspaper, the anonymous sender declared himself to be Jack the Ripper and threatened to commit a new crime. That journalistic warning was formulated before Carrie Brown was murdered in the room of a New York hotel on 24 April 1891. She is considered a possible victim of Jack the Ripper, and according to this hypothesis, James Kelly.

Kelly returned in 1927, almost forty years after his initial escape, to the psychiatric hospital. He was aged and sickly, and said that during his long stay in the United States he devoted himself to "fighting against evil".

== See also ==
- Jack the Ripper suspects
