= AH v West London Mental Health Trust =

Landmark court case in England

AH vs West London Mental Health Trust was a landmark case in England, which established a legal precedent in 2011 when Albert Laszlo Haines (AH), a patient in Broadmoor Hospital, a high security psychiatric hospital, was able to exercise a right to a fully open public mental health review tribunal to hear his appeal for release. The case and the legal principles it affirmed have been described as opening up the secret world of tribunals and National Health Service secure units, and as having substantial ramifications for mental health professionals and solicitors, though how frequently patients will be willing or able to exercise the right is not yet clear.

The detention of Haines under the Mental Health Act had been continuous since 1986, mainly at Broadmoor Hospital run by West London Mental Health NHS Trust. The tribunal panel ultimately decided there were sufficient grounds for continued psychiatric detention but recommended better collaborative work towards psychiatric rehabilitation and gradual supported pathways to lower security then release to community mental health services.

== Legal process ==
=== Gaining the right ===
Haines's request for his mental health tribunal to be fully open to the public was first made in 2009 but was turned down twice by the First-tier Tribunal. The justification for the refusal included claims that: Haines's primary intention was to air 'subjective grievances'; his evidence would not be 'objectively sensible'; he would be more difficult to control; the public would not be accurately informed; and the cost and the risk to the patient's health and conduct were disproportionate to any possible benefits.

In 2010 the Upper Tribunal ruled that the First Tier had erred in law, having not correctly identified or applied the principles it should have. In effect it had failed to uphold the fundamental principle that open justice is a right and it is the exceptions that must be justified, rather than vice versa. In addition to such a principle in common law, under Article 6 of the European Convention on Human Rights (Right to a fair trial), reinforced by the Convention on the Rights of Persons with Disabilities (Article 13 Access to justice), detained psychiatric patients have the same right as non-disabled detainees to have their case heard in public, provided they are mentally capable of giving informed consent for their right to patient confidentiality to be waived.

The Upper Tribunal therefore set aside the First Tier's decision, and was then at liberty to substitute its own decision. A short hearing was held for that purpose in February 2011, taking testimony from Broadmoor staff and Haines by video link. The panel concluded there was a sufficient rationale in Haines's case to grant an open appeal hearing, and that this was not offset by possible risks or extra costs. Broadmoor Hospital, run by West London Mental Health NHS Trust since 2001, had fought the decision.

=== Engaging in the hearing ===
The appeal hearing itself, the first ever to be open to the public and media, commenced in September 2011 in central London and lasted for two days. Mr Haines's consultant psychiatrist, Dr Jose Romero-Urcelay, was cross-examined for one day. Haines's ward clinical nurse manager, social worker and hospital 'independent' patient advocate also testified. Haines himself submitted a written report and testified for 20 minutes. Evidence was also heard from an independent social worker and from Albert Haines's brother Leigh, who was offering to house and support him should he be released.

The decision was that Haines should not yet be released, even conditionally to a lower security facility. The reasons for the decision were published two weeks later, for the first time ever and contrary to a written representation submitted on behalf of Haines. The three-member panel headed by Judge McGregor-Johnson, Honorary Recorder, concluded that under the Mental Health Act Mr Haines was still considered to have a mental disorder of a nature or degree to justify detention in hospital for treatment, and that he still presented a sufficient risk to others and himself. However, Broadmoor Hospital staff were urged to find a way to better engage with Haines, even if that meant starting treatment on his own terms, and to put a clear pathway in place so that Haines could see an acceptable way to progress to lower security facilities and eventual release.

Haines's solicitor, Kate Luscombe of the firm Duncan Lewis, said her client had received fair public support, had been able to air his grievances, and had followed the proceedings appropriately throughout; however she said Haines was disappointed at the final judgements and questioned whether his treatment over 25 years had promoted his rehabilitation. A spokesperson for West London NHS stated they were pleased the hearing was over due to the burden it being public put on the hospital's resources, that they thought the verdict agreed that Broadmoor was the best treatment environment presently, but that they would continue to seek ways to engage Haines in treatment. Albert Haines's sister Denise, however, stated that she believed Albert could not get the kind of help he needs at Broadmoor and fears he would not come out alive.

== Personal background ==
The legal process made extensive reference to Haines's life as a child and adult, and he was the focus of some national press coverage which included personal interviews. Born in 1959 in Hammersmith, London, Albert Haines suffered neglect and abuse from a young age. He was put in residential care for many years, as were his three sisters and two brothers. A mental health assessment at just five years of age described him as 'emotionally maladjusted'. He was sexually and physically abused. After leaving residential homes once an adult, Haines stayed in hostels, bedsits or on the streets. He drank alcohol and took cannabis, cocaine and amphetamines. He was convicted of criminal damage in 1979 and in 1980 for possession of an offensive weapon. He was in and out of psychiatric hospitals.

In May 1986 while a patient of the Maudsley Hospital run by South London and Maudsley NHS Trust, Haines went in carrying a machete and a small knife. There is some disagreement between media reports as to whether he threatened staff and gave himself up, or tried to attack a member of staff but was prevented. No one was physically hurt. Later that year he pleaded guilty to attempted wounding. Rather than being sentenced to prison, he was sent to Broadmoor high-security psychiatric hospital for treatment under the Mental Health Act.

In 1992 Haines was transferred to the medium secure Three Bridges Unit in Ealing, London, also now run by West London Mental Health NHS Trust. While there he made successful visits out of hospital and worked in catering without incident, but after a confrontation with hospital staff involving being put in seclusion after brandishing a fire extinguisher and climbing onto the roof, he was returned to Broadmoor in 2008.

== Psychiatric context ==
According to the tribunal, Albert Haines was long diagnosed with a personality disorder – meaning an enduring and pervasive difficulty that developed by at least adolescence/early adulthood and which especially affects social interaction. The panel noted that several psychiatric reports have concluded that Haines demonstrates features of either emotionally unstable personality disorder and/or antisocial personality disorder. They also referred to childhood conduct disorder being demonstrated by his historical records. References were also made to 'psychopathic disorder', a legal category in the Mental Health Act 1983 which could cover any persistent mental disorder if it appeared to lead (in the individual case) to abnormally aggressive or irresponsible conduct; the category was abolished by amendments in the Mental Health Act 2007 which came into force in 2008. A separate political-administrative category of "Dangerous and Severe Personality Disorder" had been introduced in the UK from the turn of the 21st century, and one of four DSPD units nationwide was at Broadmoor Hospital although it is not clear whether Haines was considered under this category.

According to the tribunal, Mr Haines was also long found to have a mental illness in addition to underlying personality disorder, but in 2008 was rediagnosed as having a personality disorder only. Dr Romero-Urcelay of Broadmoor testified that Haines does suffer from a psychotic illness with specific persecutory delusions, at least since he was returned to Broadmoor from Three Bridges in 2008 and refused to accept any treatment from them. Other psychiatrists have not concluded that he has a psychotic illness at all, while others have gone further in concluding that he has a generalised psychosis which meets the criteria for schizoaffective disorder.

At his hearing, Haines disputed the diagnoses of personality disorder and psychosis, although he accepted that he had difficulties. He refused to accept the type of treatment offered by Broadmoor even if any release or step-down in security was conditional on it. He said that as a vulnerable young man he had looked to the experts for help but had been given multiple diagnoses, forced medication and incarceration. He said that trauma from his childhood abuse had not been properly recognised or reported for 25 years and that non-directive counselling had never been offered despite his asking for it ever since he could remember.

== See also ==
- Forensic psychiatry
- Campaign for John Hunt
