= Alan Reeve =

Murderer

Alan Patrick Reeve (born 1948) is an English murderer released from Broadmoor Hospital in 1998. He battered a 15-year-old boy to death and later strangled a fellow prisoner at Broadmoor. After escaping to Amsterdam, he killed a police officer in a gunfight and was imprisoned in the Netherlands for ten years. He then lived in the Republic of Ireland before being extradited back to the United Kingdom.

== Early life ==
Reeve's father was a military prison officer and the family moved between postings in Cyprus, Tripoli and West Germany. He came to the notice of the police at a young age, committing crimes such as theft and attempted robbery. At the age of 15, he escaped from borstal and killed the 15-year-old Roger Jackson by hitting and stabbing him. He hid the body in Castle Park, Colchester and then sent three postcards to Jackson's parents, writing on them "DOA" (dead on arrival). After the body was found, Reeve was convicted of murder and sent to Broadmoor secure psychiatric hospital in 1964, with no time limit on his sentence.

== Broadmoor ==
Reeve strangled fellow Broadmoor prisoner Billy Doyle to death in 1968 after an argument in the common room. He confessed to the murder and was convicted, but later denied he had done it, claiming he made it up to get the attention of his medical officer. Whilst regarded as highly dangerous by staff, Reeve committed no more crimes and completed a sociology degree. In August 1981, Reeve escaped from Broadmoor by scaling two walls. For the first one he used a grappling hook with a rope made from sheets, then he climbed scaffolding to get over the second. He drove away from Broadmoor with his girlfriend Pat Ford, to whom he had become engaged to be married. The police set up roadblocks in Berkshire, Hampshire and Surrey, but the couple managed to flee to the Netherlands, where they lived in squats in Amsterdam.

== Netherlands ==
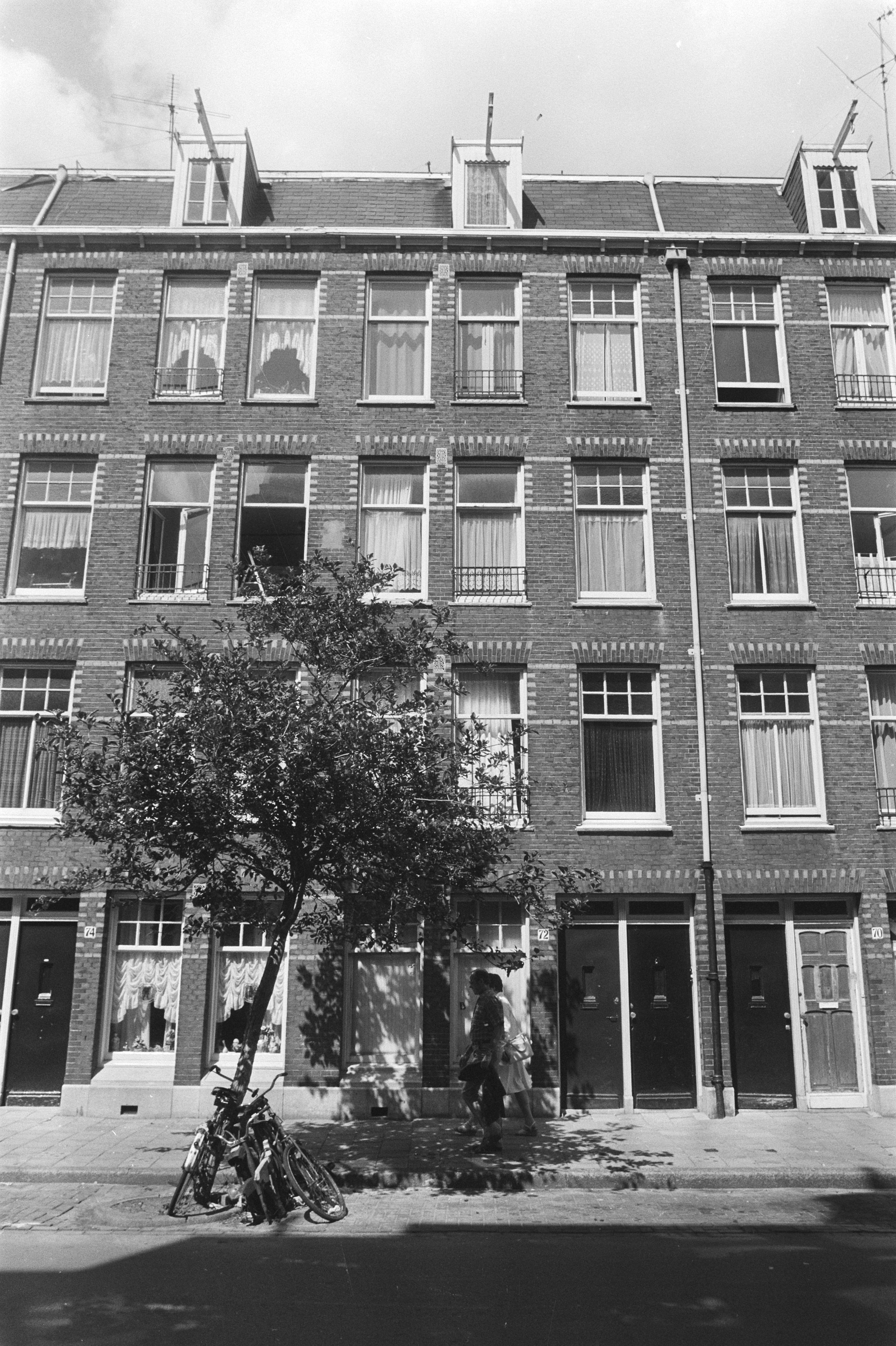
The Dutch squat where Reeve was living when he killed Jaap Honingh

One year later, when Reeve went to steal bottles of whisky and Cointreau to celebrate his escape from Broadmoor, he caused a gunfight with the police in which he wounded two officers and took a woman hostage. One officer, Jacob Honingh, died of his injuries. Reeve was arrested and subsequently received a 15-year sentence for manslaughter. He married Ford whilst on remand. He was first jailed at Norgerhaven in Veenhuizen, where he gained a degree in political science from the University of Leiden in 1988. After a foiled escape attempt, Reeve was moved to a maximum security prison at the Scheveningen branch of the Hague Penitentiary Institution. He responded by going on hunger strike for 54 days. He also worked on his thesis "The creation and preservation of consciousness" (Het ontstaan en bewaren van bewustzijn).

Reeve was released on parole in 1992 after having served ten years of his sentence. The UK government requested extradition but the Dutch courts refused to remand him, so he went into hiding in the Netherlands. The decision not to extradite was overruled a year later, but by then there was no trace of Reeve. His lawyer argued that extradition would breach articles 3 and 5 of the Treaty of Rome. Whilst in prison, Reeve had started to work with the Dutch prison reform group the Coornhert Liga (similar to the Howard League for Penal Reform). A spokesperson for the Coornhert Liga said it had no intention of breaking links with Reeve. When this became known it caused outrage in both the UK and the Netherlands.

Joost Seelen released a documentary in 1993 entitled Jaar één, Alan Reeve na dertig jaar opsluiting (Year one: Alan Reeve after 30 years in jail) which followed Reeve after his release. Seelen had known Reeve since 1986.

== Extradition ==
In 1995, it was revealed that Reeve was living in Cork in the Republic of Ireland. His brother was living with his wife in Ballincollig and Reeve lived in various addresses in Cork, under the name of Henry. He worked as a typesetter for the Women's Poetry Circle. He met Anne Murphy and lived with her in Gurranabraher. They were planning to marry when he was arrested in April 1997 and extradited back to the UK. Reeve consented to the extradition, saying that his sentence would be commuted after his "good behaviour over a long period of time". The following day, Reeve decided to contest the extradition but was unsuccessful.

Having returned to the UK, Reeve was taken to Broadmoor after a hearing in Bracknell, Berkshire. Five months later he was released from Broadmoor and returned to Cork.
