= Broadmoor Hospital =

High security hospital in Berkshire, England

- West London NHS Trust
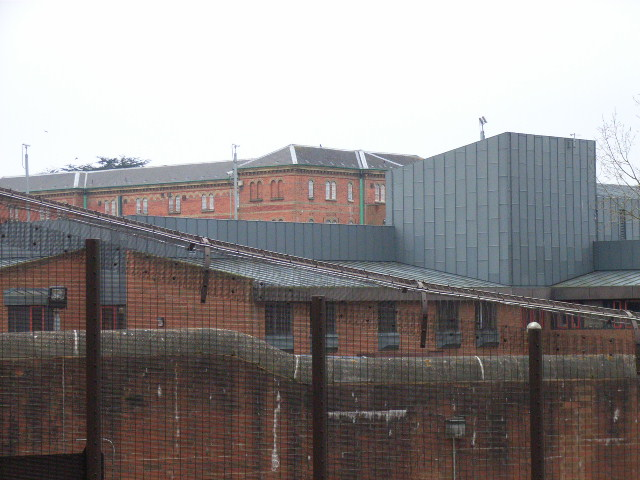
- Broadmoor in 2006

- Shown in Berkshire

Geography
- Location: Crowthorne, Berkshire, England
- Coordinates: 51°22′09″N 00°46′43″W

Organisation
- Care system: National Health Service
- Type: Psychiatric

Services
- Emergency department: No
- Beds: 284

History
- Founded: 1863; 163 years ago

Links
- Website: www.westlondon.nhs.uk/our-services/adult/secure-services/broadmoor-hospital

Broadmoor Hospital is a high-security psychiatric hospital in Crowthorne, Berkshire, England.

It is the oldest of England's three high-security psychiatric hospitals, the other two being Ashworth Hospital near Liverpool and Rampton Secure Hospital in Nottinghamshire. The hospital's catchment area consists of four National Health Service regions: London, Eastern, South East and South West. It is managed by the West London NHS Trust.

== History ==
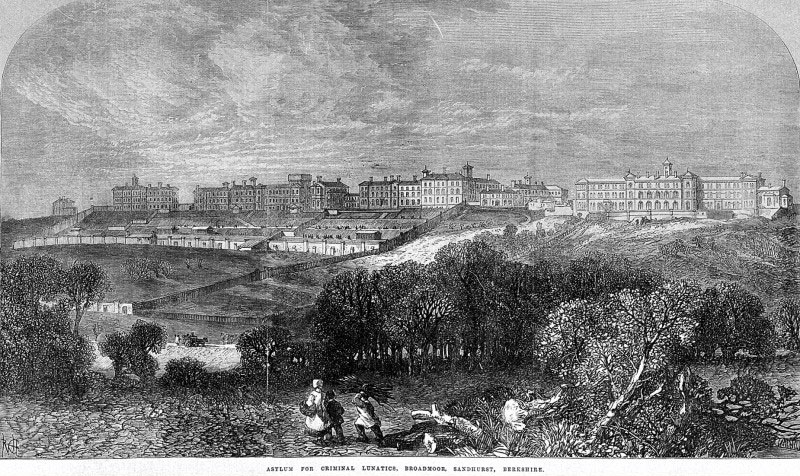
The asylum in 1867

The hospital was first known as the Broadmoor Criminal Lunatic Asylum. Completed in 1863, it was built to a design by Sir Joshua Jebb, an officer of the Corps of Royal Engineers, and covered 53 acres (21 hectares) within its secure perimeter.

The first patient was a female admitted for infanticide on 27 May 1863. Notes described her as being "feeble-minded". It has been suggested by an analysis of her records that she most likely had congenital syphilis. The first male patients arrived on 27 February 1864. The original building plan of five blocks (four for men and one for women) was completed in 1868. An additional male block was built in 1902.

Due to overcrowding at Broadmoor, an extending asylum branch was constructed at Rampton Secure Hospital and opened in 1912. Rampton was closed as a branch asylum at the end of 1919 and reopened as an institution for "mental defectives" rather than lunatics. During the First World War Broadmoor's block 1 was also used as a prisoner-of-war camp, called Crowthorne War Hospital, for mentally ill German soldiers.

In 1952, John Straffen escaped Broadmoor and murdered a local child. As a response, the hospital set up an alarm system, which was activated to alert people in the vicinity, as well as the public including those in the surrounding towns of Sandhurst, Wokingham, Bracknell, Camberley and Bagshot, when any potentially dangerous patient escapes. It was based on Second World War air raid sirens, and a two-tone alarm sounded across the whole area in the event of an escape. Until 2018, it was tested every Monday morning at 10 am for two minutes, after which a single tone 'all-clear' was sounded for a further two minutes. All schools in the area were required to keep procedures designed to ensure that in the event of a Broadmoor escape no child was ever out of the direct supervision of a member of staff. Sirens were located at Sandhurst School, Wellington College, Bracknell Forest Council depot and other sites until they were decommissioned upon the opening of the hospital's new site.

Following the Peter Fallon QC inquiry into Ashworth Special Hospital, which reported in 1999, and which found serious concerns about security and abuses resulting from poor management, it was decided to review the security at all three of the special hospitals in England. Until this time each was responsible for maintaining its own security policies. This review was made the personal responsibility of Sir Alan Langlands, who at the time was chief executive of the NHS England. The report that came out of the review initiated a new partnership whereby the Department of Health sets out a policy of safety, and security directions, that all three special hospitals must adhere to.

In 2003, the Commission for Healthcare Improvement declared the Victorian buildings at Broadmoor Hospital 'unfit for purpose'.

In 2015, the Care Quality Commission gave the hospital an Inadequate rating. In 2018, the hospital was rated as Good overall by the Care Quality Commission.

== Therapies ==
Broadmoor uses both psychiatric medication and psychotherapy, as well as occupational therapy. One of the therapies available is the arts, and patients are encouraged to participate in the Koestler Awards Scheme. One of the longest-detained patients at Broadmoor is Albert Haines, who set a legal precedent in 2011 when his mental health tribunal hearing was allowed to be fully public; he argued there that he had never been given the type of counselling he had always sought, and the panel urged the clinicians to work more collaboratively and clearly towards his psychiatric rehabilitation.

== Nature of the facility ==
Because of its high walls and other visible security features as well as the news reporting it has received in the past, the hospital is often assumed to be a prison by members of the public. Many of its patients are sent to it via the criminal justice system, and its original design brief incorporated an essence of addressing criminality in addition to mental illness. The layout inside and the daily routine are intended to assist the therapy practised there rather than to be run as a prison. Nearly all staff are members of the Prison Officers' Association in contrast to other health service unions such as UNISON and the Royal College of Nursing.

== Governance ==
=== Historical governance ===
The first medical superintendent was John Meyer. His assistant, William Orange, succeeded him. Orange established "a management style that was greatly admired". He also advised the Home Office on how to approach criminal insanity. Orange was in charge from 1870 to 1886.

From its opening, until 1948, Broadmoor was managed by a council of supervision, appointed by and reporting to the Home Secretary. Thereafter, the Criminal Justice Act 1948 transferred ownership of the hospital to the Department of Health (and the newly formed NHS) and oversight to the Board of Control for Lunacy and Mental Deficiency established under the Mental Deficiency Act 1913. It also renamed the hospital Broadmoor Institution. The hospital remained under direct control of the Department of Health – a situation that reportedly "combined notional central control with actual neglect" – until the establishment of the Special Hospitals Service Authority in 1989, with Charles Kaye as its first chief executive.

Alan Franey ran the hospital from 1989 to 1997, having been recommended for the post by his friend Jimmy Savile. His leadership was undermined by persistent rumours of sexual impropriety on the hospital grounds. Allegedly, he ignored at least three sexual assaults that he had been informed about.

The Special Hospitals Service Authority was abolished in 1996, being replaced by individual special health authorities in each of the high-security hospitals. The Broadmoor Hospital Authority was itself dissolved on 31 March 2001.

=== Current governance ===
On 1 April 2001, West London Mental Health (NHS) Trust took over the responsibility for the hospital. The trust reports to the NHS Executive through NHS England London. The former director, who then became the CEO of the trust, quit in 2009 after Healthcare Commission/Care Quality Commission findings of serious failures to ensure patient safety at Broadmoor. In 2014 the director of specialist and forensic services resigned (and was employed elsewhere in the NHS) just prior to the conclusions of an investigation into a bullying culture. The next permanent CEO retired in 2015 in the wake of poor Care Quality Commission findings and other problems in the Trust.

A new head of security was appointed in March 2013, John Hourihan, who had thirty years' experience at Scotland Yard and had worked as a bodyguard for members of the royal family.

Meanwhile, the trust allowed ITV to film a two-part documentary within Broadmoor in 2014. Press releases stated that on average there are four 'assaults' per week on staff. Psychiatrist Amlan Basu, clinical director of Broadmoor since March 2014, promoted the documentary but then decided to leave the NHS in 2015 amidst funding and staffing problems, despite the trust having just highlighted investment in his skills through its 'prestigious initiative to improve the quality of patient care in the NHS.'

== Buildings ==
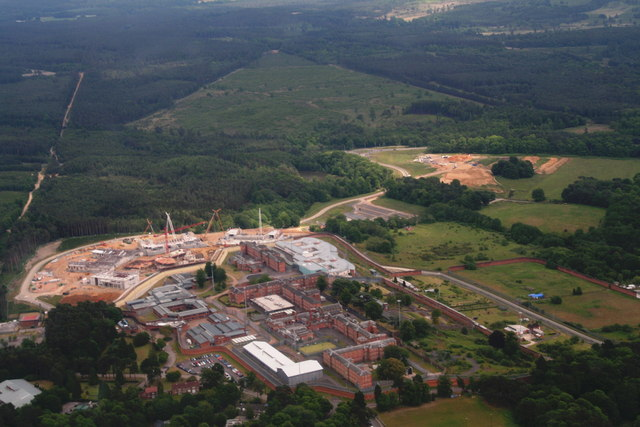
Building work at Broadmoor-aerial 2015

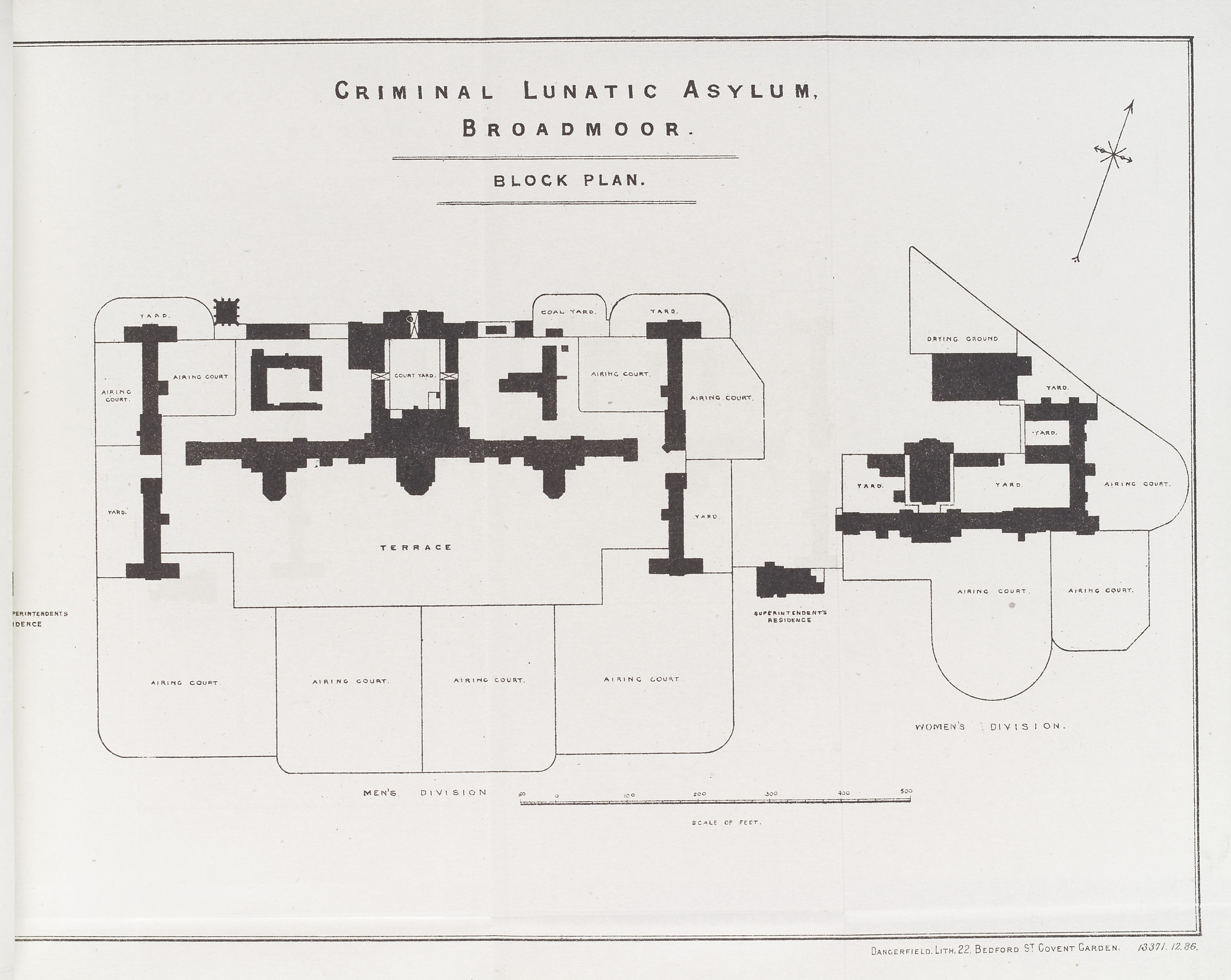
Plan of hospital

Much of Broadmoor's architecture is still Victorian, including the gatehouse, which has a clock tower.

Following long-standing reports that the old buildings were unfit for purpose (for therapy or safety), planning permission was granted in 2012 for a £242 million redevelopment, involving a new unit comprising 10 wards to adjoin the existing 6 wards of the modern Paddock Unit, resulting in total bed numbers of 234. Building company Kier reported in 2013 a sum of £115 million for the new unit of 162 beds, ready to accept patients by the start of 2017, and £43 million for a separate new medium secure unit for men nearby.

A new unit called the Paddock Centre had already opened on 12 December 2005, to contain and treat patients then classed as having a Dangerous and severe personality disorder (DSPD). At the time, this was a new and much debated category invented on behalf of the UK government, based on an individual being considered a 'Grave and Immediate Danger' to the general public, and meeting some combination of criteria for personality disorders and/or high scores on the Hare Psychopathy Check list – Revised.

The Paddock Centre was designed to eventually house 72 patients, but never opened more than four of its six 12-bedded wards. The Department of Health and Ministry of Justice National Personality Disorder Strategy published in October 2011 concluded that the resources invested in the DSPD programme should instead be used in prison based treatment programmes and the DSPD service at Broadmoor was required to close by 31 March 2012.

The trust took possession of the first phase of the new buildings, with 16 wards and 234 beds, in May 2019.

== Misconduct by staff ==
=== Abuse ===
From at least 1968, Jimmy Savile undertook voluntary work at the hospital and was allocated his own room, supported by Broadmoor CEO Pat McGrath, who thought it would be good publicity.

In August 1988, following a recommendation by Cliff Graham, the senior civil servant in charge of mental health at the DHSS, Savile was appointed by the department's health minister Edwina Currie to chair an interim task force overseeing the management of the hospital following the suspension of its board. Currie privately supported Savile's attempts to 'blackmail' the Prison Officers' Association and publicly declared her 'full confidence' in him.

After an ITV1 documentary Exposure: The Other Side of Jimmy Savile in October 2012, allegations of sexual abuse by Savile were made or re-made by former patients and staff. The civil servant who first proposed Savile's appointment to the task force at Broadmoor, Brian McGinnis, who ran the mental health division of the DHSS in 1987 before Cliff Graham, has since been investigated by police and prevented from working with children.

A Department of Health investigation led by former barrister Kate Lampard into Savile's activities at Broadmoor and other hospitals and facilities in England, with Bill Kirkup leading the Broadmoor aspects, reported in 2014 that Savile had use of a personal set of keys to Broadmoor from 1968 to 2004 (not formally revoked until 2009), with full unsupervised access to some wards. Eleven allegations of sexual abuse were known; this is thought to be a substantial under-estimate, due to how psychiatric patients in particular were disbelieved or put off from coming forward. In five cases the identity of the alleged victim could not be traced, but of the other six it was concluded they had all been abused by Savile, repeatedly in the case of two patients.

The investigation also concluded that "the institutional culture in Broadmoor was previously inappropriately tolerant of staff–patient sexual relationships", and that when there were female patients they were required to undress and bathe in front of staff and sometimes visitors. A 'shocking' failure to ensure a safe or therapeutic environment for female patients had already been revealed in a 2002 inquiry prior to Broadmoor becoming male-only.

In 2010, a female charge nurse received a suspended prison sentence for engaging in sexual activity with a patient at the hospital.

=== Violating patient confidentiality ===
Journalists invading the privacy of patients or reporting false information about them have been the subject of dozens of complaints from Broadmoor. Healthcare assistant Robert Neave took payments from The Sun for several years to provide them with information, including copies of psychiatric reports; this was subsequently investigated by Operation Elveden. Mental health nurse Kenneth Hall was imprisoned in June 2015 for having repeatedly sold stories to the tabloids based on stolen medical notes and fabricated documents.

== Former and current patients ==
=== Current patients ===
Name	Arrived at Broadmoor	Details
Robert Napper	1995	Napper, a serial killer and rapist, was convicted of two murders, one manslaughter, two rapes and two attempted rapes. He was convicted of the 1993 double murder of Samantha Bisset and her daughter Jazmine Bisset and since the time of his first trial, has been detained at Broadmoor. Later, on 18 December 2008, Napper was found guilty of the manslaughter of Rachel Nickell on the grounds of diminished responsibility, which occurred on 15 July 1992. He was sentenced to indefinite detention at Broadmoor. Napper has been diagnosed with paranoid schizophrenia as well as Asperger syndrome.
Peter Bryan	2004	Bryan was sent to Rampton Secure Hospital in 1994, having admitted to murdering a 21-year-old shop assistant in 1993. In February 2001, staff were convinced of his considerable progress regarding his behaviour. He was later moved into a hostel in north London in 2002, before being transferred to an open psychiatric ward at Newham General Hospital. Hours after being discharged from the hospital, he killed his friend and dismembered him, with police officers finding a frying pan on the stove with tissue from the dead man's brain. He was remanded to Broadmoor, where ten days after being admitted, he killed another patient. He was later pleaded guilty to two manslaughters on the grounds of diminished responsibility, with his original sentence of a whole-life order being overturned to a minimum term of 15 years. However, it is unlikely that he will ever be released and is currently detained at Broadmoor, having been committed for treatment.
Kenneth Erskine	2009	Erskine, a serial killer, was also known as the Stockwell Strangler, targeting elderly victims, having broken into their homes. Found guilty of seven murders in 1988, he was sentenced to life and later moved to Broadmoor, when he was found to have the mental age of a 12-year-old at the time of the crimes.
Michael Adebowale	2013	Adebowale, an Islamic terrorist was one of two men convicted for the murder of Lee Rigby in 2013. He was found to be a borderline schizophrenic who heard voices in his head, speaking in Nigerian accents telling him what to do next, with a history of serious mental illness. He was recommended for treatment in Broadmoor shortly before his trial. Despite this, he was found fit to enter a plea, however, did not give evidence. Examined by a series of doctors, he confessed to killing Rigby (this confession was never revealed to the jury). He stated that he had converted to Christianity and then converted back to Islam because of "jinns" or spirits. His symptoms of psychosis were found to increase with his heavy cannabis use. He was found guilty and was sentenced to life imprisonment with a minimum term of 45 years, being sent to Broadmoor for treatment for paranoid schizophrenia. In 2018, Adebowale assaulted a nurse, punching him in the face after he asked Adebowale to turn the volume down. He pleaded guilty to assault occasioning actual bodily harm and was sentenced to eight months imprisonment, to be served after his minimum 45-year tariff is served.
Nicholas Salvador	2015	Salvador beheaded 82-year-old Palmira Silva in her garden in Edmonton, London. Friends of Salvador had recently noticed odd behaviour by him, including drug and alcohol abuse and an obsession with videos of beheadings. Psychiatrists found evidence that Salvador had paranoid schizophrenia. On 23 June 2015, he was found not guilty of murder on basis of insanity, and was detained indefinitely in a psychiatric hospital.
Zakaria Bulhan	2017	Bulhan stabbed six people, one fatally in August 2016. Six people, apparently selected at random, were stabbed. A 64-year-old American, Darlene Horton, died at the scene. She had planned to fly back to Florida the following day. An American man, a British man, an Australian man, an Australian woman, and an Israeli woman were injured. The British man, Bernard Hepplewhite, underwent emergency surgery for a serious abdominal wound and remained in hospital for several days. Not long before the stabbing, Bulhan completed his first studies at South Thames College, and had been a patient at a psychiatric facility near Russell Square. According to a family friend, Bulhan called an ambulance three separate times in the last six months, claiming he wanted to harm himself. He was sentenced on 7 February to be detained for an indefinite period in a maximum security hospital.
Muhaydin Mire	2016	Mire, armed with what was described as a blunt 3-inch (7.5 cm) bread knife, attacked three people at Leytonstone Underground station in East London. One of the three victims was seriously injured, and the other two sustained minor stab wounds. The attacker was named as 29-year-old Muhaydin Mire of Leytonstone, who was found guilty of attempted murder and four counts of attempted wounding in June 2016. he was sentenced to life imprisonment with a minimum term of eight and a half years and started to serve his term at Broadmoor Hospital.
Marcus Monzo	2025	On 30 April 2024, Monzo crashed a van into a pedestrian and property in Hainault, London before going on to randomly attack people with a samurai sword. One of the victims was 14-year-old boy named Daniel Anjorin, who was walking to school and was killed following the attack. Four other people were injured, including two police officers. Another two of the victims were attacked whilst in bed after Monzo had broken into their home. One male police officer had suffered from a serious hand injury, whilst a female officer was injured in the arm and required surgery. On 25 June 2025, Monzo was convicted of one count of murder, three counts of attempted murder and one of wounding with intent. He was sentenced to life imprisonment with a minimum term of 40 years before becoming eligible for parole. In January 2025, whilst on remand at HM Prison Belmarsh, Monzo was transferred to Broadmoor Hospital.
Axel Rudakubana	2026	Rudakubana, then aged 17, murdered three young girls and injured ten other people in a mass stabbing at a children's dance workshop in Southport, England on 29 July 2024. Rudakubana was detained at His Majesty's pleasure for a minimum term of 52 years and was originally imprisoned at HMP Belmarsh, but has been temporarily moved to Broadmoor Hospital since July 2026 resulting from clinical assessment during his imprisonment, being deemed too dangerous and mentally unsound for a prison environment. His sentence was not converted to a hospital order, meaning he is expected to return to prison following treatment.

=== Former patients ===
Name	Time at Broadmoor	Details
Ian Ball	1974–2019	Ball attempted to kidnap Princess Anne in 1974, as she was in a car en route to Buckingham Palace. His plan was to hold her for ransom and donate £3 million to the NHS, feeling that mental health services weren't good enough. Having been charged with attempted murder and kidnapping, Ball was assessed and diagnosed with schizophrenia. He was sentenced to be detained at Broadmoor under the Mental Health Act "without limit of time". He was released on bail in 2019.
Peter Sutcliffe	1984–2016	Sutcliffe, a serial killer known as the 'Yorkshire Ripper'; was at Broadmoor after it was found he suffered from paranoid schizophrenia. Whilst at Broadmoor, Sutcliffe survived multiple attempts on his life from other patients, with one attack causing a loss of vision in his left eye. He was moved to HM Prison Frankland, Durham, after it was deemed he no longer suffered from paranoid schizophrenia.
Ronnie Kray	1979–1995	Kray, along with his twin Reggie, carried out an extensive number of crimes during the 1950s and 1960s, resulting in both being imprisoned for life in 1969. Originally a Category A prisoner, Kray was later moved to Broadmoor when he was certified insane, suffering from schizophrenia. Kray died of a heart attack in March 1995 whilst at Broadmoor.
Robert Maudsley	1974–1977	Maudsley, a serial killer, committed his first murder in 1974. He was found unfit to stand trial and was instead sent to Broadmoor. Whilst there, he tortured and murdered a patient in the hospital over a period of 9 hours. He was transferred from the hospital to Wakefield Prison, later sentenced to life imprisonment, with the recommendation he never be released. It was there in 1978, that he killed two fellow prisoners (he originally set out to kill seven).
Charles Salvador	1979	Salvador, formerly known as Charles Bronson, was an armed robber, who first arrived at Broadmoor in October 1979, having attacked prison staff and attempted suicide at HM Prison Parkhurst's psychiatric wing (the only prison willing to accept him following his violent behaviour). Having arrived at Broadmoor, he was soon transferred to Rampton Secure Hospital. Having attempted to strangle another patient, he was returned to Broadmoor, where he attempted to strangle another patient. In 1982, he staged a protest on the roof, tearing off roof tiles and causing £250,000 worth of damage, before his family talked him down. He staged another rooftop protest, demanding that he be transferred to a prison.
David Copeland	1999	Copeland killed three people with homemade nail bombs in London. After his arrest, he was assessed by five psychiatrists at Broadmoor and diagnosed as having paranoid schizophrenia, with one diagnosing a personality disorder, not serious enough to avoid a murder charge. There were no disputes Copeland was mentally unwell; however, it became a matter of contention as to the extent of his illness regarding whether he was able to take responsibility for his actions. Despite pleading guilty to manslaughter on the grounds of diminished responsibility, this was not accepted by either the prosecution or jury. Upon sentencing for murder, he was transferred to HM Prison Belmarsh.
Daniel Gonzalez	2004–2007	Gonzalez, a spree killer, murdered four people and injured two others during two days across London and Sussex, having been inspired by horror films, such as A Nightmare on Elm Street and Friday the 13th, to become a "famous serial killer". From the age of 17, Gonzalez received care because of his psychological problems and was treated by specialist mental health teams. By the age of 24, he was unemployed and using drugs. He spent all his time playing computer games and watching horror films. After his arrest, Gonzalez was held at Broadmoor, where he attempted to bite himself to death, attempting to bite through an artery. He was considered so violent that he was accompanied everywhere by officers in riot gear. Gonzalez attempted to claim he was not guilty by reason of insanity, however, this was rejected and he was given six life sentences, with a recommendation he was never released. In August 2007, whilst in his room at Broadmoor, Gonzalez committed suicide by cutting himself with the edges of a broken CD case.
James Kelly	1883–1888 1927–1929	Kelly murdered his wife, seventeen days after marrying. The first coroner found him fit to stand trial and he was sentenced to death. However, the superintendent of Broadmoor later examined Kelly and found him insane. He was sentenced to be confined to Broadmoor indefinitely. Later, on 23 January 1888, having fabricated a key, he escaped from Broadmoor and for 39 years, he remained at large. However, on 12 February 1927, Kelly handed himself in to Broadmoor, begging to be re-admitted, stating: "I am very tired and I want to die with my friends". He remained at the hospital and later died of double lobular pneumonia. Kelly is considered a Jack the Ripper suspect, with this being proposed by later theorists; Kelly's escape was around the time the Ripper murders began.
John Straffen	1951–1952	Straffen, a serial killer, killed two girls and was committed to Broadmoor when it was found he suffered wide and severe damage to his cerebral cortex. In 1952, he escaped from Broadmoor, climbing the hospital's ten-foot wall. During his escape, he killed another girl before being captured. On his capture, he was moved to HM Prison Wandsworth and several other prisons, before dying at HM Prison Frankland in 2007, aged 77. He was one of the longest serving prisoners in British history, serving 55 years before his death.
Graham Young	1962–1971	Young, a serial killer, was sentenced to detention at Broadmoor under Section 60 of the Mental Health Act to 15-years. At just 14 years old, he poisoned his victims, including his family, lacing their food and drink with thallium and antimony (The Poisons Act 1972 was created to restrict and control the sale of poisons after Young's court case concluded). Soon after his arrival at Broadmoor, a fellow patient died of cyanide poisoning. Whilst he was suspected by some staff and patients (having enjoyed explaining in detail how cyanide could be extracted from laurel leaves, which covered the grounds around Broadmoor), the patient's death was ruled a suicide. Later, Harpic was found in a nurse's coffee and the contents of a missing packet of sugar soap were located in a tea urn.As one of the youngest-ever patients, Young was later released from Broadmoor having been deemed rehabilitated, despite having told a nurse: "When I get out, I'm going to kill one person for every year I've spent in this place." Upon his release, he continued to poison victims, this time his workmates, resulting in two deaths and several critical injuries. He was convicted on two counts of murder and two counts of attempted murder and sentenced to life imprisonment. Young requested to service this in a prison and this was granted. He later died of a heart attack in 1990 at HM Prison Parkhurst, aged 42. With no history of heart disease, it is speculated as to whether he committed suicide or was murdered by prisoners or prison staff who did not feel safe around him.
Haroon Rashid Aswat	2008–2015	Rashid Aswat, is a British terrorist who has been linked to the 7 July 2005 bombings in London. American officials allege that he has ties to Al-Qaeda, and have sought his extradition to the United States, which is supported by the British government. However, after his internment in Broadmoor Hospital in 2008 after being diagnosed with paranoid schizophrenia (having been arrested in 2005), in 2010 the European Court of Human Rights blocked efforts to extradite Aswat due to concerns over the conditions of his potential imprisonment in the United States. Aswat was later extradited to the US, pleading guilty to terrorism charges and was sentenced to 20-years-imprisonment. He will be returned to the United Kingdom on the completion of his sentence.
Antony Baekeland	1972–1980	Baekeland stabbed his mother, Barbara Daly Baekeland, to death in her London home in November 1972. He was found at the scene and later confessed to her murder. This followed him trying to throw his mother under the traffic in July 1972, where he was arrested for attempted murder, but no charges were brought, when his mother refused to support the investigation. As a result, Baekeland was subsequently admitted to The Priory private psychiatric hospital, but was released soon afterwards. Continuing sessions with a psychiatrist while living at home, the doctor became so concerned about Baekeland's condition that on 30 October, he warned Barbara that he was capable of murder. Barbara dismissed the doctor's assertion, however, was later killed by Baekeland. Baekeland was institutionalised at Broadmoor until 21 July 1980, when, at the urging of a group of his friends, he was released. Following his release, he flew directly to New York City to stay with his 87-year-old maternal grandmother, Nini Daly. Only six days after his release, on 27 July, he attacked her with a kitchen knife, stabbing her eight times and breaking several bones. He was then arrested by the New York City Police Department, charged with attempted murder and sent to Rikers Island prison, later committing suicide in his cell. Baekeland was the great-grandson of Leo Baekeland.
William Rutherford Benn	1883–1890 1903–1921	Rutherford Benn, father of Dame Margaret Rutherford, murdered his father and was detained at Broadmoor until 1890, returning in 1903 and receiving treatment until his death.
Sharon Carr	1998–2007	Carr, who at age 12 became Britain's youngest female murderer, killed an 18-year-old woman, picking her at random as she walked home from a Camberley nightclub in 1992. The murder remained unsolved until 1994, when Carr stabbed another pupil at her school and boasted about the previous murder. She was convicted of murder in 1997 and ordered to serve at least 14 years, initially held at HM Prison Holloway, before being transferred to Broadmoor in 1998. Whilst in Broadmoor, she continued to assault staff and other residents, and admitted wanting to kill a fellow inmate by slitting her throat. On occasions she also claimed to believe that she was a lizard and tried to cut herself to attempt to find out whether she was still human. In 2007, Carr was moved again to the medium-secure Orchard Unit, but was sent to HM Prison Bronzefield in 2015 as a Restricted Status prisoner as she was presenting a risk to patients and staff. Carr remains imprisoned long after this minimum tariff expired due to her disruptive behaviour in prison. A Restricted Status prisoner, she has continued to regularly attack and attempt to kill staff members and fellow inmates and has regularly expressed her desire to kill others. In September 2022, it was reported that her case would again go before a parole board.
Richard Dadd	–1886	Dadd killed his father in August 1843, having become convinced that his father was the Devil in disguise. He fled to France and en route to Paris, he attempted to kill a fellow passenger with a razor but was overpowered and arrested by police. Dadd confessed to killing his father and was returned to England, where he was committed to the criminal department of Bethlem psychiatric hospital (also known as Bedlam). After 20 years at Bethlem, Dadd was moved to the newly built Broadmoor facility. There he remained for the remainder of his life, painting constantly and receiving infrequent visitors; he died on 7 January 1886, "from an extensive disease of the lungs". Dadd probably had paranoid schizophrenia. Two of his siblings had the condition, while a third had "a private attendant" for unknown reasons.
Gregory Davis		Davis, a spree killer, planned to become a serial killer and used his diary to plot to murder. Progressing on a diary entry that spoke of a desire to kill ad infinitum "all over the world," he eventually went on a murder spree on 28 January 2003. Working his way through a compiled hit list he first paid visit to Stewart Johnson who escaped as kitchen fitters were working in his home. Davis then continued down the list to Stantonbury, to the home of Dorothy Rogers. His plea of manslaughter on the grounds of diminished responsibility was accepted, after five psychiatrists diagnosed him with major depressive disorder, social anxiety disorder, alcohol dependence and to be suffering from a psychotic episode at the time of the crime. He was given an indefinite sentence to be served at Broadmoor, where he resided until 2009, when he was transferred to Littlemore Hospital where he was allowed out on short release. A Mental Health Review Tribunal decided he would be released in July 2011.
Christiana Edmunds	1872–1907	Edmunds, known as the 'Chocolate Cream Poisoner', carried out a series of poisonings in Brighton during the early 1870s. Edmunds purchased confectionery from a local shop and laced the sweets with strychnine before returning them to be sold to unsuspecting members of the public. Her actions resulted in several people becoming seriously ill, and at least one death. Arrested and put on trial, Edmunds was initially sentenced to death. However, this was later commuted to life imprisonment. She spent the rest of her life at Broadmoor, dying there in 1907.
Ibrahim Eidarous		Eidarous, an alleged member of al-Jihad, was held in the custody of the United Kingdom from 1999, fighting extradition to the United States, where he was wanted in connection with the 1998 United States embassy bombings. Eidarous was diagnosed with advanced-stage leukaemia by 2002, and treated by the National Health Service in the UK, while being held at Broadmoor Hospital. He was released on house arrest, and died in July 2008 in London while awaiting extradition.
Frankie Fraser		Fraser, a gangster, was certified as insane in the 1950s, having been sent to HM Prison Durham for taking part in bank robberies, where he was then transferred to Broadmoor. Afraid of being heavily medicated for bad behaviour, Fraser stayed out of trouble and was released in 1955.
June and Jennifer Gibbons	1981–1993	The Gibbons twins, known as the silent twins due to their selective muteness, committed a number of crimes including vandalism, petty theft and arson, which led to their being admitted to Broadmoor Hospital. The twins were sentenced to indefinite detention under the Mental Health Act 1983. The girls had a longstanding agreement that if one died, the other must begin to speak and live a normal life. During their stay in the hospital, they began to believe that it was necessary for one of them to die, and after much discussion, Jennifer agreed to make the sacrifice of her life. They remained at Broadmoor before being moved to the more open Caswell Clinic in Bridgend, Wales. On arrival, Jennifer could not be roused. She was taken to the hospital, where she died soon after of acute myocarditis, a sudden inflammation of the heart. There was no evidence of drugs or poison in her system. By 2008, June was living quietly and independently, near her parents in West Wales. She is no longer monitored by psychiatric services, has been accepted by her community, and sought to put the past behind her.
Thomas John Ley	1947	Ley was an English-born Australian politician and black marketeer in wartime Britain. In 1946, his partner Maggie Evelyn Brook was living in Wimbledon, and Ley had his house at 5 Beaufort Gardens, London, converted into flats. Ley falsely believed that Brook and a barman called John McMain Mudie were having an affair. Ley persuaded two of his labourers that Mudie was a blackmailer, and together they tortured and killed him. The case became known as the "Chalk-pit Murder" because Mudie's body was dumped in a chalk pit on Woldingham Common in Surrey, thirty miles from Ley's home. With Lawrence John Smith, Ley was tried at the Old Bailey; both were sentenced to death in March 1947. However, both Smith and Ley escaped the noose: Smith's sentence was commuted to life imprisonment, while Ley was declared insane and sent to Broadmoor. He died there soon after of a cerebral haemorrhage. He is said to have been the wealthiest person ever to be imprisoned at Broadmoor. He left an estate in New South Wales valued for probate at £744. He is widely suspected to have been involved in the deaths of a number of people in Australia, including political rivals
Roderick Maclean	1880–	Maclean attempted to assassinate Queen Victoria at Windsor with a pistol. This was the last of eight attempts to kill or assault the Queen over a period of four decades. Maclean's motive was purportedly a curt reply to some poetry that he had mailed to the Queen. Tried for high treason on 20 April, Maclean was found "not guilty, but insane" by a jury after five minutes' deliberation, overseen by Lord Chief Justice Coleridge, and lived out his remaining days in Broadmoor Asylum. The verdict prompted the Queen to ask for a change in English law so that those implicated in cases with similar outcomes would be considered as "guilty, but insane"; this led to the Trial of Lunatics Act 1883.
William Chester Minor	1872–1910	Minor, a former American army surgeon was an amateur lexicographer known as the Surgeon of Crowthorne. Haunted by his paranoia, he fatally shot George Merrett, whom Minor wrongly believed to have broken into his room. Merrett had been on his way to work to support his family: six children and his pregnant wife, Eliza. After a pre-trial period spent in London's Horsemonger Lane Gaol, Minor was found not guilty by reason of insanity and incarcerated in Broadmoor. As he had his US Army pension and was judged not dangerous, he was given rather comfortable quarters and was able to buy and read books and contribute to the Oxford English Dictionary. He committed autopenectomy) and was eventually repatriated to the United States.
Daniel M'Naghten	1864–1865	M'Naghten assassinated English civil servant Edward Drummond, mistaking him for the Prime Minister, while suffering from paranoid delusions. The jury, without retiring, duly returned a verdict of not guilty on the ground of insanity. After his acquittal M'Naghten was transferred from Newgate Prison to the State Criminal Lunatic Asylum at Bethlem Hospital under the 1800 Act for the Safe Custody of Insane Persons charged with Offences. He was then transferred to the newly opened Broadmoor. He died there in May 1865, aged 52. Following his trial and its aftermath, his name has been given to the legal test of criminal insanity in England and other common law jurisdictions known as the M'Naghten rules.
Edward Oxford	1864–1867	Oxford was the first of seven unconnected people who attempted to assassinate Queen Victoria. Having been dismissed from a pub, he purchased two pistols and fired twice at Queen Victoria and her husband, Prince Albert, with neither being injured. Oxford was arrested and charged with high treason. A jury found him not guilty by reason of insanity and he was detained indefinitely at Her Majesty's pleasure at the two State Criminal Lunatic Asylums: first at Bethlem Royal Hospital and then, after 1864, Broadmoor Hospital. Visitors and staff did not consider him insane. In 1867 Oxford was given the offer of release if he relocated to a British colony; he accepted and settled in Melbourne, Australia, until his death, aged 78.
Richard Archer Prince	–1937	Prince, an actor, murdered another actor, William Terriss, outside the Adelphi Theatre in London in December 1897. At his Old Bailey trial, the defence presented an insanity defence, with doctors and even his mother giving evidence that he was of unsound mind. The jury pronounced Prince "guilty, but according to the medical evidence, not responsible for his actions." He was transferred from Holloway Prison to Broadmoor and became involved in entertainment for the inmates and conducted the prison orchestra until his death from natural causes in January 1937 aged 79. His relatively mild sentence was met with anger by the theatrical community, and Sir Henry Irving would later be quoted as saying "Terriss was an actor, so his murderer will not be executed."
Nicky Reilly	2009–2015	Reilly, attempted to commit a suicide bombing in Exeter in 2008 using a nail bomb. Reilly was the only person injured and he pleaded guilty to launching the attempted suicide attack, receiving a life sentence with a minimum term of 18 years imprisonment. Reilly had previously been detained in a mental health hospital and had learning difficulties, Emotionally Unstable Personality Disorder (EUPD) and Asperger's syndrome. Having been convicted, Reilly was transferred to Broadmoor, remaining there for the next six years. In July 2015, Reilly and another patient assaulted members of staff, resulting in him being transferred back to prison. In October 2016, Reilly hanged himself in HM Prison Manchester. It was concluded that he had likely acted impulsively due to his EUPD and Asperger's syndrome and without the intent to kill himself.
Damian Rzeszowski	2011	Rzeszowski, having murdered six members of his family in Saint Helier, Jersey in the Channel Islands, was held at Broadmoor. Consultant psychiatrist Dale Harrison interviewed Rzeszowski five days after the attacks and heard he could not remember what had happened. After returning from treatment in Broadmoor, he claimed he could hear voices. He denied six murders but pleaded guilty to manslaughter due to diminished responsibility. Rzeszowski was sentenced to life in prison, 30 years for each victim to run concurrently. On 31 March 2018, six years into his sentence, the killer died in a suspected suicide in Full Sutton prison, a high-security jail in Yorkshire. A post-mortem examination determined that his cause of death was hanging. The inquest in April 2023 heard that two weeks prior to his death, medical staff decided to refer him to Broadmoor Hospital.
Roy Shaw		Shaw, a gangster, was sentenced to 18 years' imprisonment for an armed robbery in 1963, one of England's largest armoured truck robberies. Shaw reportedly fought his way out of two different holding cells at HM Prison Maidstone, assaulting several prison guards. Shaw, who claimed he "simply hates the system", and that the "system could never beat him", was moved between different prisons and spent time at Broadmoor, where he underwent experimental electroconvulsive therapy in an attempt to control his temper However, the doctor reported the treatments as having been a complete failure, and only served to make Shaw even more aggressive and unpredictable.
Ronald True	1922–1951	True murdered prostitute and call girl Gertrude Yates in 1922. Initially sentenced to death for her murder, his conviction was later reprieved following a psychiatric examination ordered by the Home Secretary which determined that True was legally insane. True was then confined for life in Broadmoor Hospital in lieu of his death sentence. He died of a heart attack while still confined at Broadmoor in January 1951, aged 59.
Robert Torto	2007–	Torto, who suffered from paranoid schizophrenia and had a "history of assault", set out to target Hindus, Muslims and other communities in London, killing two men in 2006 after setting fire to a food-and-wine shop in Kennington. Detectives found a handwritten note from Torto detailing a number of different bombs and targets including gay clubs, hospitals carrying out sex changes and all non-Christian religious institutions. At a pre-trial hearing, he claimed to be the "Son of God". Torto later pleaded guilty to manslaughter and was sentenced to indefinite detention at Broadmoor.
Callum Wheeler	2021–2022	Callum Wheeler moved from HM Prison Belmarsh whilst on remand for the murder of Kent PCSO Julia James in April 2021. He was assessed; however, a doctor noted there was "no clear evidence of a direct link" between Wheeler's mental illness and the offence. Found guilty of James' murder, Wheeler was sentenced to life imprisonment, with a minimum sentence of 37 years imprisonment.
Barry Williams	1979 onwards	Williams, a spree killer, shot eight people in the English Midlands towns of West Bromwich and Nuneaton in little over an hour on 26 October 1978, killing five. Following a high-speed car chase, he was arrested and in 1979 was convicted of manslaughter on the grounds of diminished responsibility, with psychiatrists providing evidence that he had an active paranoid psychosis. He was detained in high-security hospitals, including Broadmoor, under mental health legislation. Williams was released from hospital in 1994, after a mental health tribunal found he was no longer a risk to the public. However, in October 2014, having pleaded guilty to three charges of possessing a prohibited firearm, to putting a neighbour in fear of violence, and to making an improvised explosive device, Williams was again ordered to be detained indefinitely, this time under sections 37 and 41 of the Mental Health Act 1983. Williams was returned to Ashworth Hospital, where he was already being treated on recall from his previous detention. He died on 24 December 2014 from a suspected heart attack.
Alan Reeve	1968–1981 1997	Reeve strangled fellow Broadmoor prisoner Billy Doyle to death in 1968 after an argument in the common room. He confessed to the murder and was convicted, but later denied he had done it, claiming he made it up to get the attention of his medical officer. Whilst regarded as highly dangerous by staff, Reeve committed no more crimes and completed a sociology degree. In August 1981, Reeve escaped from Broadmoor by scaling two walls. For the first one he used a grappling hook with a rope made from sheets, then he climbed scaffolding to get over the second. He drove away from Broadmoor with his girlfriend Pat Ford, to whom he had become engaged to be married. The police set up roadblocks in Berkshire, Hampshire and Surrey, but the couple managed to flee to the Netherlands, where they lived in squats in Amsterdam. One year later, when Reeve went to steal bottles of whisky and Cointreau to celebrate his escape from Broadmoor, he caused a gunfight with the police in which he wounded two officers and took a woman hostage. One officer, Jacob Honingh, died of his injuries. Reeve was arrested and subsequently received a 15-year sentence for manslaughter. Reeve was released on parole in 1992 after having served ten years of his sentence. The UK government requested extradition but the Dutch courts refused to remand him, so he went into hiding in the Netherlands. The decision not to extradite was overruled a year later, but by then there was no trace of Reeve. In 1995, it was revealed that Reeve was living in Cork in the Republic of Ireland. Reeve was arrested in April 1997 and extradited back to the UK. Reeve consented to the extradition, saying that his sentence would be commuted after his "good behaviour over a long period of time". The following day, Reeve decided to contest the extradition but was unsuccessful. Having returned to the UK, Reeve was taken to Broadmoor after a hearing in Bracknell, Berkshire. Five months later he was released from Broadmoor and returned to Cork.
Orville Blackwood	1987–1991	Blackwood began to hear voices and behave "in a bizarre manner" and at his admission in August of that year, he bit a nurse. A series of brief admissions became the pattern over the subsequent four years, with states of highs and agitation, sexual disinhibition, aggression and according to the hospital authorities he "lacked any insight". In January 1986, using a toy gun, he attempted to rob a betting shop and was subsequently arrested and examined in HM Prison Brixton. No mental illness had been diagnosed at that time. He received a three-year sentence and while being moved to HM Prison Grendon he was noted to be in a state of paranoia and aggression, and at one time tried to hang himself. In October 1987, he was moved to Broadmoor. There, several times he was restrained, placed in seclusion and administered large doses of medications in response to his behaviour. On the morning of 28 August 1991, he voluntarily made his way to "seclusion" after refusing to attend his occupational therapy session. When a group of health professionals entered his room several hours later, he became aggressive. Under the instruction of his physicians, he was held down and injected with promazine, a major tranquilliser, at three times the maximum dose as stated in the British National Formulary, and with twice the recommended dose of fluphenazine. Blackwood died almost immediately, the third black patient, after Michael Martin and Joseph Watts, to die at the hospital within seven years, under similar circumstances. Forty seven recommendations were made. Several addressed issues relating to ethnicity, including appointing black staff in senior management posts. The committee suggested further research into administering anti-psychotic medication in emergency settings.
Albert Goozee	1956–1971	Goozee murdered his landlady and her daughter in 1956 and was sentenced to death. However, four days before his execution, he was given a reprieve and was instead detained at Broadmoor. Released in 1971, Goozee, who had been diagnosed with paranoid schizophrenia, was subsequently convicted of several further violent crimes, and in 1996 was convicted of indecently assaulting two girls, aged 12 and 13. Sentencing, Mr. Justice Gower said one of the two cases had been "one of the most serious cases of indecent assault that I have ever had to deal with". In October 2009, Goozee again became the subject of media interest when it was discovered that he had been released on compassionate grounds into the care of a nursing home for the elderly in Wigston, Leicester. While there, Goozee began a hunger strike and refused all food and medication. After developing a blood clot in his heart and complications from diabetes, he died on 25 November 2009. The coroner recorded a verdict of death by natural causes.
Arthur Lloyd James	1941–1943	Lloyd James, stressed by World War II, killed his wife, fearing the war would otherwise cause her hardship. The murder weapons were a fork and poker. He was tried at the Central Criminal Court, with Mr. Justice Wrottesley presiding. The prosecutor was Mr. G. B. McClure, and Mr. Richard O'Sullivan, K.C. was the defence. Brixton Prison senior medical officer Dr. H. A. Grierson argued that Lloyd James had manic depressive insanity with a predominant depressive stage. Lloyd James pleaded not guilty; the jury found him guilty but insane. He was sentenced to Broadmoor, where he hanged himself in 1943.
Binky McKenzie	1972	McKenzie was convicted of the manslaughter of his parents and brother-in-law, where his younger sister was also stabbed and seriously injured during a siege at the family home in Cricklewood, London. At the Old Bailey in March 1972, McKenzie was found guilty on three counts of manslaughter on the grounds of diminished responsibility. During the 1960s, McKenzie was a musician who played and recorded with several musicians such as Alexis Korner, John McLaughlin, Pete Brown, Denny Laine, Vincent Crane and Duffy Power.
David Cedric Morgan	2002	Morgan, a schizophrenic, stabbed 15 people in a Rackhams department store in Birmingham, England. Three people were seriously injured and needed surgeries. In addition of those stabbed, five people were treated for shock. despite a disagreement between his legal team and the NHS, it was later determined by a psychologist that Morgan was vulnerable and isolated but apparently suffered from no mental illnesses. Morgan was sentenced to life imprisonment in February 1996. He admitted to nine offences of wounding with intent to cause grievous bodily harm and one of assault. In 2002, he was transferred from Broadmoor to a medium security unit where he would be allowed on escorted shopping trips as part of rehabilitation. In 2006, Morgan, then 43 years old, was released into the community to go shopping. At the time, he was being treated at the Stafford's St George's Hospital.

== See also ==
- Forensic psychiatry

== Sources ==
- Bronson, Charles; Ackroyd, Robin (2000). Bronson. London: John Blake Publishing Ltd. p. 167. ISBN 1-85782-393-1.
- Emsley, John (2005), The Elements of Murder: A History of Poison, OUP Oxford, ISBN 9780191517358
- Holden, Anthony (1995), The St Albans Poisoner, Corgi Books, ISBN 9780552144087
- Scott-Moncrieff, Lucy; Briscoe, James; Daniels, Granville (January 2009). An independent investigation into the care and treatment of Daniel Gonzales (PDF) (Report). NHS South Coast.
