= Beaufort Gardens =

Street and former garden square in London

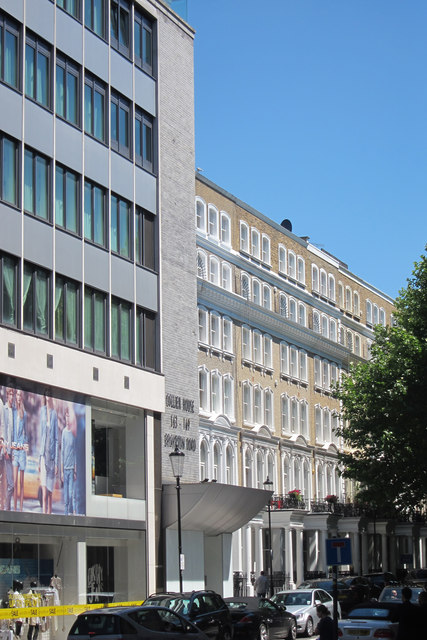
- Beaufort Gardens as seen from Brompton Road
- Interactive map of Beaufort Gardens
- Coordinates: 51.498068°N 0.1642390°W

Beaufort Gardens is a cul-de-sac and former garden square off the south side of Brompton Road in the Knightsbridge area of London.

== Description ==
The street is a long and narrow cul-de-sac off the south side of Brompton Road. It was formerly a garden square although the gardens running down the centre have since been removed and replaced with parking between the row of trees that run the street's span.

The architectural design of the houses are considered to be archetypal of the high Victorian development of much of Kensington. They feature stock brick designs and stuccoed detailing, with the symmetrical terraces lining both sides of the street give it a uniform character. The Survey of London describes them as "an orthodox high-class Kensington type".

Among the buildings are Nos. 41-43 which include interiors designed by Pierre Yovanovitch, and the 5-star Knightsbridge Hotel which occupies No. 10.

== History ==
The site now occupied by the square was once a row of cottages with pasture lands behind. The course of the street was similar, ending at the parish boundary in the south. The area underwent development beginning from the 1860s, with George Adam Burn, who had served as assistant to Thomas Hopper, the architect of a group of shops on Brompton road opening onto a garden square, most of the buildings facing Brompton Road no longer exist.

Beaufort Gardens itself was originally to be known as Brompton Grove, retaining the name used to describe the houses which were demolished to make way for its entrance from Brompton Road. The name Beaufort Garden was given by the Quenterys, although the name's provenance is not known. The square itself was developed by Jeremiah Little with his son Henry Little, being completed in around 1870, among the last of the streets south of Brompton Road to be developed. The newly built houses quickly attracted high profile inhabitants, including by 1885 a large number of military occupants.

== See also ==
- Ovington Square
- Brompton Road
- Brompton Square
