= Torta (disambiguation) =

Torta can refer to:

- Torta, a Spanish word with a huge array of regional culinary meanings, from its traditional meaning of flatbread to cake
  - Torta de Gazpacho, a flatbread
  - Torta, a Mexican sandwich
  - Torta, a kind of Philippine omelette of ground meat and potatoes, although in Visayas and Mindanao, 'torta' refers to a sponge cake
- Torta, the Hungarian, Czech, Slovak, Bosnian, Croatian, Serbian, Italian, Portuguese and Bulgarian word for cake, typically made with layered sponge & cream, chocolate or fruit filling
- Torta, a surname with origins in Northern Italy near Venice
- Bidens torta, the corkscrew beggartick, a plant species
- Torta, a type of lava dome erupted by volcanoes
- Torta, slang for an overweight Hispanic woman

== See also ==
- Torte
