= Robert Torto =

Ghanaian hate criminal

Robert Torto is a Ghanaian hate criminal who murdered two Asian men, Khizar Hayat and Hamidullah Hamidi, in the London district of Kennington in 2006. He was described as the "Son of God killer" in the media, having claimed to be the Son of God during a court-hearing before his trial. His victims died of burns and smoke inhalation after he threw a petrol bomb into the shop in which they worked. Witnesses described him "laughing" as he ran from the scene.

== Crimes ==
Torto, who suffered from paranoid schizophrenia and had a "history of assault", set out to target Hindus, Muslims and other communities in London. His first attack was on a newsagent in Tulse Hill on 14 April 2006. He threw a petrol bomb into the shop and caused serious burns to a customer, who later required skin grafts to his legs. Four days later, he attacked an off licence in South Norwood, leaving the owner with severe burns. Finally, on 27 April, he fire-bombed a food-and-wine shop in Kennington. Of the four people then on the premises, two were able to escape by running through the flames, although they suffered burns as they did so. However, staff-members Khizar Hayat and Hamidullah Hamidi were trapped because the rear door of the shop was locked. They suffered burns and smoke inhalation before the fire brigade was able to reach them. Hayat was declared dead on arrival at hospital, Hamidi died five days later on May 2.

== Arrest and trial ==
Witnesses had seen Torto "laughing" as he ran from the scene of the arson. Using their description, the police examined CCTV footage and saw Torto leaving the scene in a green Ford Cougar, which he had also used for his two previous attacks. The car was placed under surveillance and Torto was arrested leaving his home in Stockwell. The police searched his home and found a handwritten list of targets, which included gay clubs, hospitals where sex changes were performed, prostitutes and members of all non-Christian religions, including Muslims, Hindus and pagans. Torto refused to explain why he had carried out his hate-crimes and did not express remorse for the deaths and injuries he had caused. Detective Chief Inspector David Garwood, who had led the investigation, said: "Robert Torto clearly had a mission in mind and that was to attack people from a number of different communities with crude yet dangerous homemade accelerant devices. ... I am convinced that had Torto remained undetected he would have attacked again, which may have resulted in the further loss of life." The judge at the trial, Peter Beaumont, ordered Torto to be detained indefinitely under the Mental Health Act. He was sent to Broadmoor Hospital, a high-security hospital for the criminally insane.

== Psychiatric history ==
Torto had a long history of involvement with police and mental services. In 1996, he confronted two Asian men, threatening them with a handgun and hitting one in the stomach. He was jailed for eighteen months for assault. In 1998, he twice targeted a supermarket, first telling the owner he would set him on fire, then saying he would blow up the premises. He was jailed for three months for using threatening words and behaviour and common assault. After release, Torto was examined by psychiatrists and prescribed anti-psychotic medication, but he failed to keep his appointments and was assessed again by psychiatrists in February 2001. He claimed he could influence the Ghanaian government and wanted the United Nations to ban sin. He was given a place at a psychiatric unit in March 2001, where he received compulsory medication, but after a month he "managed to fool doctors into letting him out". He seems to have had no further contact with psychiatric services until his arrest for double-murder in 2006. At a pre-trial hearing, he claimed to be the "Son of God".
