= The Nightmare Neighbour Next Door =

British television series (2014–2021)

- Intertitle
- Genre: Documentary
- Narrated by: Simon Nock; Dominic Thorburn, Suzie Toase
- Country of origin: United Kingdom
- Original language: English
- No. of seasons: 8
- No. of episodes: 74

Production
- Production company: Flame TV

Original release
- Network: Channel 5
- Release: 1 April 2014 – 27 September 2021

The Nightmare Neighbour Next Door is a British documentary television series broadcast on Channel 5 since 1 April 2014. The show follows some of the most extreme cases of fallouts between neighbours all over the country, using real-life interviews and reconstruction. The show has proven to be one of the most popular shows on the channel.

== Premise ==
The hour-long show goes behind closed doors to find out what happened between neighbours when disputes arise, following some of the most extreme cases in the country. The dispute is usually told mostly from the point of view of the neighbour who reported their experiences to the show's producers, starting with how the feud started and then, to how it escalated. Both neighbours are approached for comment by the producers however. During each episode, up to 4 stories of neighbourly disputes can be covered, with the show normally going back and forth between them. The Nightmare Neighbour Next Door relies heavily on reconstructions.

== Episodes ==
The first series aired on Tuesday nights at 8 PM (GMT). Starting with the second series, the show has aired on Wednesday nights at 8PM.

Series	Episodes	Premiere	Finale
1	6	1 April 2014	6 May 2014
2	7	20 August 2014	29 October 2014
3	6	1 April 2015	6 May 2015
4	8	29 July 2015	16 September 2015
5	21	22 September 2016	18 March 2017
6	11	10 May 2017	23 April 2019
7	10	6 January 2020	11 May 2020
8	5	12 July 2021	27 September 2021

=== Series 1 (2014) ===
Episode	Air Date	Description
1	01/04/2014	
2	08/04/2014	
3	15/04/2014	
4	22/04/2014	
5	29/04/2014	
6	06/05/2014	

=== Series 2 (2014) ===
Episode	Air Date	Description
1	24/09/2014	
2	01/10/2014	
3	07/10/2014	
4	14/10/2014	
5	21/10/2014	
6	28/10/2014	

=== Series 3 (2015) ===
Episode	Air Date	Description
1	02/04/2015	
2	08/04/2015	
3	15/04/2015	
4	22/04/2015	
5	29/04/2015	
6	06/05/2015	

=== Series 4 (2015) ===
Episode	Air Date	Description
1	29/07/2015	
2	05/08/2015	
3	12/08/2015	
4	19/08/2015	
5	26/08/2015	
6	02/09/2015	
7	09/09/2015	
8	16/09/2015	

=== Series 5 (2016–2017) ===
Episode	Air Date	Description
1	22/08/2016	
2	29/08/2016	
3	06/10/2016	
4	13/10/2016	
5	20/10/2016	
6	27/10/2016	
7	03/11/2016	
8	10/11/2016	
9	17/11/2016	
10	24/11/2016	
11	01/12/2016	
12	08/12/2016	
13	15/12/2016	
14	24/01/2017	
15	31/01/2017	
16	02/03/2017	
17	09/03/2017	
18	16/03/2017	
19	18/03/2017	
20	02/06/2016	
21	21/07/2016	

=== Series 6 (2017–2019) ===
Episode	Air Date	Description
1	05/10/2017	
2	12/10/2017	
3	19/10/2017	
4	25/10/2017	
5	15/02/2018	
6	21/02/2018	
7	22/02/2018	
8	01/03/2018	
9	16/04/2018	
10	08/11/2018	
11	23/04/2019	

=== Series 7 (2020) ===
Episode	Air Date	Description
1	06/01/2020	
2	13/01/2020	
3	20/01/2020	
4	27/01/2020	
5	03/02/2020	
6	13/04/2020	
7	20/04/2020	
8	27/04/2020	
9	04/05/2020	
10	11/05/2020	

=== Series 8 (2021) ===
Episode	Air Date	Description
1	12/07/2021	TBA
2	19/07/2021	TBA
3	26/07/2021	TBA
4	20/09/2021	TBA
5	27/09/2021	TBA
