= E. Fuller Torrey =

American psychiatrist and schizophrenia researcher

- Born: Edwin Fuller Torrey; September 6, 1937 (age 89); Utica, New York, U.S.
- Education: Princeton University; McGill University; Stanford University
- Scientific career
- Fields: Psychiatry
- Workplaces: Stanley Medical Research Institute (SMRI), Treatment Advocacy Center (TAC)

Edwin Fuller Torrey (born September 6, 1937), is an American psychiatrist and schizophrenia researcher. He is associate director of research at the Stanley Medical Research Institute (SMRI) and founder of the Treatment Advocacy Center (TAC), a nonprofit organization whose principal activity is promoting the passage and implementation of outpatient commitment laws and civil commitment laws and standards in individual states that allow people diagnosed with severe mental illness to be involuntarily hospitalized and treated throughout the United States.

Torrey has conducted numerous research studies, particularly on possible infectious causes of schizophrenia. He has become well known as an advocate of the idea that severe mental illness, psychosis, is due to biological factors and not social factors as may be found in neurotic illnesses. He has appeared on national radio and television outlets and written for many newspapers. He has received two Commendation Medals by the U.S. Public Health Service along with other awards and tributes. He has been criticized by a range of people, including federal researchers and others for some of his attacks on de-institutionalization and his support for forced medication as a method of treatment.

Torrey is on the board of the Treatment Advocacy Center (TAC), which describes itself as being "a national nonprofit advocacy organization". TAC supports involuntary treatment when deemed appropriate by a judge (at the urging of the person's psychiatrist and family members). Torrey has written several books on mental illness, including Surviving Schizophrenia. He is a distant relative of abolitionist Charles Turner Torrey and has written his biography.

== Education and early career ==
Torrey earned his bachelor's degree from Princeton University, and his M.D. from the McGill University Faculty of Medicine. Torrey also earned a master's degree in anthropology from Stanford University, and was trained in psychiatry at Stanford University School of Medicine. At McGill and later at Stanford, he was exposed to a biological approach and recalls that one of his first-year instructors at McGill was Heinz Lehmann, the first clinician in North America to use the first neuroleptic medication, chlorpromazine.

Torrey practiced general medicine in Ethiopia for two years as a Peace Corps physician followed by practiced in the South Bronx, US. From 1970 to 1975, he was a special administrative assistant to the National Institute of Mental Health director. He then worked for a year in Alaska in the Indian Health Service. He became a ward physician at St. Elizabeths psychiatric hospital in Washington, D.C. for nine years, where he reportedly worked with the most challenging patients and aimed to avoid the use of seclusion or restraints on the acute admission units. He also volunteered at Washington, D.C. homeless clinics.

== Stanley Medical Research Institute ==
Torrey is the founder and executive director of the Stanley Medical Research Institute (SMRI), a large, private entity for conducting research on schizophrenia and bipolar disorder in the U.S. SMRI also maintains a collection of postmortem brain tissue from individuals with schizophrenia, bipolar disorder, and major depression and from unaffected controls, which are made available to researchers without charge.

After reading Torrey's book Surviving Schizophrenia, Theodore Stanley, a businessman who had made a fortune in direct-mail marketing and whose son had been diagnosed in the late 1980s with bipolar disorder, contacted Torrey and he and his wife provided the funds for the new institute.

As of 2004 the Stanley Institute had 30 employees and funded half of all U.S. research on bipolar disorder and about a quarter of all schizophrenia research. In 2003 the institute's research budget was around $40 million, 74 percent of which was given out to other researchers through grants. As of 2008 SMRI reported that 75% of its expenditure goes towards the development of new treatments.

The Stanley Medical Institute in Bethesda, Maryland has collected around 600 brains as of 2008

The SMRI has been sued for allegedly taking brains for use in research without proper consent. One lawsuit was settled out of court.

SMRI reports that it has a close relationship with and is the supporting organization for the Treatment Advocacy Center (TAC).

== Treatment Advocacy Center ==
Torrey is a founder of the Treatment Advocacy Center, a national organization that supports outpatient commitment for certain people with mental illness who, in his view of their treatment history and present circumstances, are judged unlikely to survive safely in the community without supervision. TAC has been credited by New York State Attorney General Eliot Spitzer and others with helping pass Kendra's Law in the state. Kendra's Law allows court-ordered involuntary treatment of people diagnosed with schizophrenia or other severe mental illness who have a history of not following psychiatric advice, i.e., individuals who are, "as a result of his or her mental illness, unlikely to voluntarily participate in the recommended treatment pursuant to the treatment plan." Previously, only inpatient programs were available to submit a person to involuntary treatment. TAC's efforts to pass Kendra's Law led to similar successful passage of Laura's Law in California, and similar laws in Florida and elsewhere.

== National Alliance on Mental Illness ==
Torrey was for many years an active advisor for the National Alliance on Mental Illness (NAMI). Parents felt that he spoke up for them when much of the medical establishment had previously held that parenting was responsible for schizophrenia. Torrey helped build NAMI into a powerful political force through campaigning and donating the hardcover royalties from the sale of his book Surviving Schizophrenia.

Although Torrey, TAC, and NAMI remain aligned, NAMI may have tried to distance itself from TAC in 1998. One source The Psychiatric Times, reported that TAC was designed from the start to be "a separate support organization with its own source of funding." According to MindFreedom International, an association of survivors of psychiatric treatment opposed to involuntary treatment, NAMI severed its relationship with TAC because of pressure from groups opposed to Torrey both from within NAMI and outside NAMI. Torrey is, according to MindFreedom, one of "the most feverishly pro-force psychiatrists in the world". MindFreedom suggests that the "links between NAMI and TAC are simply going from overt to covert."

In 2002, NAMI's Executive Director issued a statement highly critical of 60 Minutes for producing a piece entitled "Dr. Torrey's War." In the statement, NAMI alternately criticized and backed various positions espoused by Torrey while aiming its criticism at 60 Minutes for what NAMI called "sound bite journalism."

Torrey was also the keynote speaker at the 23rd annual NAMI convention in 2002.

In 2005, NAMI gave Torrey a tribute on its 25th Anniversary Celebratory Donor Wall, for those who have donated over $25,000. It called him a groundbreaking researcher, a ferociously resolute advocate, a prominent and admired author of dozens of books and a dedicated practicing clinician, and said that he had "touched the lives of countless NAMI members throughout this nation."

NAMI has some continuing links to TAC via their board of directors. Frederick Frese, a psychologist who died in 2018, was on both the NAMI and TAC boards. TAC has two other former NAMI board members on their board and Laurie Flynn, the former NAMI executive director, is part of the TAC Honorary Advisory Committee.

In 2008, Torrey disagreed with a NAMI view on second-generation antipsychotics and accused the medical director and executive director of failing to disclose conflicts of interest, because they are employees of an organization that receives more than half its budget from pharmaceutical companies. He argued they were not representing the views of many members of NAMI including himself.

== Scientific research and views ==
In the 1950s, it was commonly thought that schizophrenia was caused by bad parenting. Torrey has argued that this theory had a toxic effect on parents. His sister had severe schizophrenia and spent most of five decades in hospitals and nursing homes until her death.

Torrey has been a fierce opponent of the influence of Sigmund Freud and psychoanalysis. He has also argued that psychiatry should focus only on severe mental illness, conceived as neurological disorders, rather than other mental issues that he viewed as non-medical.

Torrey was principal investigator of a NIMH Schizophrenia/Bipolar Disorder Twin Study conducted at the Neuroscience center of St Elizabeth's Hospital in the late 1980s and early 1990s, and copublished more than a dozen studies on structural brain differences between affected and unaffected siblings. He differed from his collaborators in arguing that the genetic heritability of schizophrenia was lower than typically estimated. A review of Torrey's data analysis, however, suggested he had erroneously compared different sorts of concordance statistics.

In the early 1970s, Torrey became interested in viral infections as possible causes of schizophrenia or bipolar disorder, particularly a parasite Toxoplasma gondii whose definitive host is the cat, but whose intermediate host can be any mammal, including humans. Up to one third of the world's human population is estimated to carry a Toxoplasma infection. Since then he has published, often with Robert Yolken, more than 30 articles on seasonal variation and possible infectious causes of schizophrenia, focusing especially on Toxoplasma gondii. He is involved in five or six ongoing studies using anti-Toxoplasmosa gondii agents (e.g. antibiotics such as minocycline and azithromycin) as an add-on treatment for schizophrenia. He believes that infectious causes will eventually explain the "vast majority" of schizophrenia cases. Some of his collaborators have disagreed with the emphasis he has placed on infection as a direct causal factor. Many of the research studies on links between schizophrenia and Toxoplasma gondii, by different authors in different countries, are funded and supported by the Stanley Medical Research Institute. The hypothesis is not prominent in current mainstream scientific views on the causes of schizophrenia, although infections may be seen as one possible risk factor that could lead to vulnerabilities in early neurodevelopment in some cases. Torrey hopes to live long enough to see vaccines to prevent many or most cases of schizophrenia.

Torrey has generally been in favor of antipsychotic drugs. He has claimed that taking antipsychotics reduces the risk of violence, homelessness and prison. He has argued that "noncompliance" in about half of cases of schizophrenia and bipolar disorder is due to lack of "insight" into the illness because the part of the brain for self-awareness has been affected; and that in some who are aware it is due to adverse effects ranging from tremors or sedation to sexual dysfunction to substantial weight gain. He has also reported that at least some antipsychotics cause medical conditions that can be fatal in some people, especially African Americans. He has also argued that pharmaceutical companies have too much influence over psychiatric organizations and psychiatrists, effectively buying them off.

Torrey has advocated in favor of a flexible well-funded range of community mental health services, including Assertive Community Treatment, clubhouses (staffed by professionals with consumers as members), supported housing and supported employment, emphasizing illness and medication compliance throughout. However, he has criticized community alternatives which do not enforce drug treatment, such as those espoused by many psychiatric survivors and the National Empowerment Center.

== Recognition ==
Torrey has appeared on national radio and television (outlets like NPR, Oprah, 20/20, 60 Minutes, and Dateline) and has written for many newspapers. He has received a 1984 Special Families Award from NAMI, two Commendation Medals from the U.S. Public Health Service, a 1991 National Caring Award, and a humanitarian award from NARSAD (now known as the Brain & Behavior Research Foundation). In 1999, he received a research award from the International Congress of Schizophrenia. In 2005, a tribute to Torrey was included in NAMI's 25th Anniversary Celebratory Donor Wall.

== Criticism ==
Torrey has criticized many organizations. He has charged the National Institute of Mental Health with not concentrating its resources sufficiently on severe mental illness and directly applicable research; NIMH has disputed his statistics and viewpoint.

Experts such as Dr. Peter C. Gøtzsche, Dr. Jorun Rugkåsa, James Gottstein, and others have called into question both the evidence basis and ethics of coercive practices such as court-ordered treatment, citing substantial scientific literature and patient testimony showing harm and/or lack of benefit. The United Nations and its World Health Organization have repeatedly called for the end to coercive interventions in psychiatry, naming them as human rights violations traumatizing significant portions of those affected; instead, they suggest community-based alternatives without threat of force.

Torrey has been charged with acting to limit the voice of those consumers, survivors and ex-patients that he disagrees with, opposing their civil rights and censoring and ridiculing their ideas and those of their supporters. Torrey has been a long-time critic of the Center for Mental Health Services that provides support and advocacy, on the grounds that they support anti-psychiatry groups and those opposed to outpatient commitment, claiming they neglect the seriously mentally ill due to a hippie '60s attitude, distribute funds on the basis of other factors such as "community cohesion" and ethnic minority involvement, and are more dysfunctional than the individuals they are supposed to help. He has specifically opposed public funding for the National Empowerment Center, for rejecting the medical model and arguing for a recovery model without necessarily needing medication; it has since lost its funding from the CMHS. Torrey has in general been instrumental in lobbying against, and undermining, community-based consumer projects because they promoted social and experiential recovery and questioned the standard medical model. Consumer organizations have protested that they are already economically disadvantaged and vulnerable to political whim while Torrey and his organizations have rich and powerful backers. It has been argued that Torrey and other psychiatric and family member advocates do not necessarily have the same interests as consumers/survivors themselves. Differences in ideology sharpened after the development of NAMI.

In criticizing the New Freedom Commission on Mental Health for not recommending forced outpatient medicating, Torrey claimed that stigma against people with mental disorders was largely due to them committing violent acts due to not taking medication. He called the recovery model harmful for sending a cruel message of hope, or implicit blame, to those he believes cannot engage in a recovery process, despite being a laudable long-term vision for the commission. However, there is no current evidence that forcing psychiatric drug compliance reduces risk of crime. Furthermore, evidence suggests that using antipsychotic medication may not reduce risk of homicide, and use of other popular psychiatric drugs may increase risk (based on causal inference after controlling for confounding factors related to taking medication).

Although Torrey described family members as "surviving schizophrenia" in his book of that title, in 1997 he said the term "psychiatric survivor" used by ex-patients to describe themselves was just political correctness and he blamed them, along with civil rights lawyers, for the deaths of half a million people due to suicides and deaths on the street. His comments elicited a record number of letters in response, some in favour of Torrey but most against. The accusations have been described as inflammatory and completely unsubstantiated, and issues of self-determination and self-identity said to be more complex than Torrey realizes. In the same journal in 1999, Torrey and Miller of the Stanley Foundation Research Program argued for an incentivised schizophrenia treatment system backed by a credible threat of force, modeled on that used for the fatal infectious disease tuberculosis; replies criticized the logic of the analogy and resort to forced drugging rather than developing alliances and understanding, to which Torrey accused the director and members of MindFreedom International of living off federal funds while denying illness and not caring about the mentally ill on the streets and in prisons.

Torrey has been a vocal critic of the failures of deinstitutionalization and inadequate community mental health services. He has generally linked this to issues of violence, homelessness and medication noncompliance, as well as lack of proper focus by the relevant governmental organizations. He has been accused of gaining influence by sensationalizing and exaggerating the incidence of violence and its link to medication noncompliance, including disseminating unsubstantiated and unreliable statistics. When a California NAMI journal editor included a questioning of Torrey's statistics, the local board glued together the pages and effectively shut down the journal. Others, while agreeing that public mental health care in the U.S. falls far short of what people with serious psychiatric disorders need and deserve, have argued that Torrey's solutions are outdated and that his book The Insanity Offense is based on unsubstantiated portrayals of certainty on the statistics on violence, outpatient commitment and medication, stigmatizing tens of thousands of people, deeply offending and insulting those who hold views differing from his own, and promulgating one-dimensional solutions. TAC's attempts to associate violent incidents in the news with lack of medication have been described as wild hyperbole, and the use of the term "assisted treatment" has been described as a euphemism for forced drugging.

Torrey has been criticized by, and has criticized, Thomas Szasz, a libertarian psychiatrist and author of The Myth of Mental Illness (1961), who is opposed to involuntary treatment. Torrey has said he admires Szasz for his outspoken criticisms of many psychiatric practices, including "diagnostic creep" (disease mongering) and the potential for the political abuse of psychiatric labels, but he has criticized Szasz for asserting that schizophrenia is not an organic disease of the brain like, for example, Parkinson's disease or multiple sclerosis.

== Bibliography ==
Torrey has authored 21 books and more than 200 lay and professional papers.

- 1968, Ethical Issues in Medicine: The Role of the Physician in Today's Society, Little, Brown and Co.
- 1972, The Mind Game: Witchdoctors and Psychiatrists, Emerson Hall. Republished in 1986 as Witchdoctors and Psychiatrists: The Common Roots of Psychotherapy and Its Future, Harper and Row (paperback) and Jason Aaronson Inc. (hardcover)
- 1974, The Death of Psychiatry, Chilton, ISBN 0-14-004038-2
- 1975, Why Did You Do That?: Rainy Day Games for a Post-Industrial Society, Chilton, ISBN 0-8019-6143-2
- 1980, Schizophrenia and Civilization, Jason Aronson Publishers
- 1983, Surviving Schizophrenia: A Manual for Families, Consumers, and Providers, Harper and Row, ISBN 0-06-095919-3. 2nd edition, 1988; 3rd edition, 1995; 4th edition, 2001; 5th edition, 2006; 6th edition, 2013; 7th edition, 2019.
- 1983, The Roots of Treason: Ezra Pound and the Secret of St. Elizabeths, Harcourt Brace Jovanovich, ISBN 0-15-679015-7
- 1986, Care of the Seriously Mentally Ill: A Rating of State Programs, with Sidney M. Wolfe and Laurie Flynn, ISBN 99917-962-2-3. 2nd edition, 1988; 3rd edition, 1990.
- 1988, Nowhere to Go: The Tragic Odyssey of the Homeless Mentally Ill, HarperCollins, ISBN 0-06-015993-6
- Torrey, Edwin Fuller; Stieber, Joan; Ezekiel, Jonathan; Wolfe, Sidney M; Sharfstein, Joshua; Noble, John H; Flynn, Laurie M (1992). Criminalizing the Seriously Mentally Ill: The Abuse of Jails as Mental Hospitals. A joint report of the National Alliance for the Mentally Ill and Public Citizen's Health Research Group. ISBN 0-7881-4279-8.
- 1992, Freudian Fraud: The Malignant Effect of Freud's Theory on American Thought and Culture, HarperCollins, ISBN 1-929636-00-8
- 1992, Frontier Justice: The Rise and Fall of the Loomis Gang, North Country Books Inc, ISBN 0-932052-91-6*
- 1994, Schizophrenia and Manic-Depressive Disorder: The Biological Roots of Mental Illness as Revealed by a Landmark Study of Identical Twins (senior author), with Irving I. Gottesman, Edward H. Taylor, Ann E. Bowler, Perseus Books Group
- 1996, Out of the Shadows: Confronting America's Mental Illness Crisis, John Wiley & Sons, Inc., ISBN 0-471-24532-1
- 1998, Ride with the Loomis Gang, North Country Books, ISBN 978-0-925168-56-6
- 2002, Surviving Manic-Depressive Illness: A Manual on Bipolar Disorder for Patients, Families and Providers, Basic Books, ISBN 0-465-08663-2
- 2002, The Invisible Plague: The Rise of Mental Illness from 1750 to the Present, with Judy Miller, Rutgers University Press; ISBN 0-8135-3003-2
- 2005, Beasts of the Earth: Animals, Humans, and Disease, with Robert H. Yolken, Rutgers University Press, ISBN 0-8135-3571-9
- 2006, Surviving Prostate Cancer: What You Need to Know to Make Informed Decisions, Yale University Press
- 2008, The Insanity Offense: How America's Failure to Treat the Seriously Mentally Ill Endangers Its Citizens, W.W. Norton
- 2013, The Martyrdom of Abolitionist Charles Torrey, Louisiana State University Press, ISBN 0-8071-5231-5
- 2013, American Psychosis: How the Federal Government Destroyed the Mental Illness Treatment System, Oxford University Press, ISBN 978-0199988716
- 2017, Evolving Brains, Emerging Gods: Early Humans and the Origins of Religion, Columbia University Press, ISBN 978-0231183369

== See also ==
- Treatment Advocacy Center
