= Sally Satel =

American psychiatrist

Sally L. Satel
- Satel in 2026 at the Politics and Prose bookstore
- Born: January 9, 1956 (age 70)
- Education: Cornell University; University of Chicago; Brown University

Sally L. Satel (born January 9, 1956) is an American psychiatrist based in Washington, D.C. She is a lecturer at Yale University School of Medicine, a visiting professor of psychiatry at Columbia University, a senior fellow at the American Enterprise Institute, and an author.

Satel's books include Drug Treatment: The Case for Coercion (1999), One Nation Under Therapy: How the Helping Culture is Eroding Self-Reliance (2005), and Brainwashed: The Seductive Appeal of Mindless Neuroscience (2013).

== Education ==
Satel has a bachelor's degree from Cornell University, a master's degree from the University of Chicago and an MD degree from Brown University. She completed her residency in psychiatry at Yale University between 1988 and 1993.

== Career ==
In 1993 and 1994, Satel was a Robert Wood Johnson Health Policy Fellow with the U.S. Senate Committee on Health, Education, Labor and Pensions.

Satel is a resident scholar at the American Enterprise Institute (AEI), a conservative think tank.

In 2004, as Purdue Pharma, a company known as the maker of OxyContin, one of the many drugs abused in the opioid epidemic in the United States, was facing a threat to its sales due to rising lawsuits against it, Satel wrote an op ed for the New York Times arguing that law enforcement was being overzealous, that patients require large doses of opioids to relieve pain, and that OxyContin is rarely the only drug found in autopsies of oxycodone-related deaths but typically those addicted to it use multiple drugs. In 2019, ProPublica reported that Satel's employer, AEI, has received funding from Purdue. According to AP, Satel "sometimes cited Purdue-funded studies and doctors in her articles on addiction for major news outlets and occasionally shared drafts of the pieces with Purdue officials in advance, including on occasions in 2004 and 2016." Satel responded that she was not aware that Purdue had provided funding to AEI and that she reached her conclusions independently. She claimed to have "absolutely no memory" of speaking to the staff at New Orleans hospital, which Purdue approved spending $2,000 to pay Satel to do in 2002.

In February 2019, Columbus Monthly reported that a non-profit set up by Hillbilly Elegy author JD Vance called Our Ohio Renewal was sponsoring Satel to take a one year residency in southern Ohio (an area hit by the opioid crisis), with the Ironton-Lawrence Community Action Agency, based in areas along the Ohio River near Portsmouth, Ohio. According to reason.com, she moved to Ironton in 2018.

From 2002 Satel served on the advisory committee of the Center for Mental Health Services of the Substance Abuse and Mental Health Services Administration.

== Viewpoints ==
Satel is considered a political conservative, a description she rejects.

In her 2001 book P.C. M.D., Satel critiques what she sees as the burgeoning phenomenon of politically correct (PC) medicine, which seeks to address what its proponents view as social oppression by reorganizing the distribution of public health resources. She argues that incorporating social justice into the mission of medicine diverts attention and resources from the effort to prevent and combat disease for everyone.

Satel supports assisted outpatient treatment of gravely disabled psychiatric patients. This is a type of involuntary treatment in which the person with schizophrenia or other serious mental health condition stays at home instead of being locked in a psychiatric hospital, but is required to take medication or other treatment. She describes assisted outpatient treatment as "a form of civil-court-ordered community treatment for patients who are known to be self-destructive or dangerous when off their medication".

Since 2004 she has written a series of opinion pieces in support of the medical prescription of opioids to relieve the pain of patients for whom nonsteroidal anti-inflammatory drugs and other interventions have proved ineffective. Satel acknowledges that such opioids have abuse potential. She points to data showing that people who abuse prescribed medications often have a history of substance abuse, or they are currently in psychological distress or have a psychiatric illness. She argues that data also show they are not typically pain patients who fell unwittingly into a drug habit: “When you scratch the surface of someone who is addicted to painkillers, you usually find a seasoned drug abuser with a previous habit involving pills, alcohol, heroin or cocaine. Contrary to media portrayals, the typical OxyContin addict does not start out as a pain patient who fell unwittingly into a drug habit.”

She supports regulated third-party payments to living kidney donors (e.g., tax breaks or extra money for retirement), with the goal of increasing the supply of kidneys available for transplant.

She signed an April 2014 statement in Real Clear Politics supporting legally recognizing same-sex marriage but opposing any penalties against those who do "dissent" from this position.

== Personal life ==
Satel received a kidney on March 4, 2006, from writer Virginia Postrel, after being diagnosed in 2004 with chronic kidney failure. She wrote an article in The New York Times chronicling her experience of searching for an organ donor.

== Selected works ==
External videos
- Presentation by Satel on PC, M.D., January 8, 2001, C-SPAN
- Booknotes interview with Satel on PC, M.D., July 15, 2001, C-SPAN
- Presentation by Satel and Christina Hoff Sommers on One Nation Under Therapy, April 16, 2005, C-SPAN
- Presentation by Satel on When Altruism Isn't Enough, August 24, 2009, C-SPAN
- After Words interview with Satel on Brainwashed, June 7, 2013, C-SPAN
- Presentation by Satel on Brainwashed on August 30, 2014, C-SPAN

- 1999 – Drug Treatment: The Case for Coercion. American Enterprise Institute for Public Policy Research. [77 p.] ISBN 0-8447-7128-7.
- 2001 – P.C. M.D.: How Political Correctness is Corrupting Medicine. Perseus. ISBN 0-465-07183-X.
- 2005 – One Nation Under Therapy: How the Helping Culture is Eroding Self-Reliance (with Christina Hoff Sommers). St. Martin's Press. ISBN 0-312-30443-9.
- 2006 – The Health Disparities Myth: Diagnosing the Treatment Gap. AEI Press. [92 p.] ISBN 0-8447-7192-9.
- 2013 – Brainwashed: The Seductive Appeal of Mindless Neuroscience (with Scott O. Lilienfeld). Basic Books. ISBN 978-0-465-01877-2.

== See also ==
- Kendra's Law
- Laura's Law
- New Freedom Commission on Mental Health
- Outpatient commitment
- TeenScreen
