= Sharfstein =

Sharfstein or Scharfstein is a surname. Notable people with the surname include:

- David S. Scharfstein (born 1960), American professor
- Joshua Sharfstein (born 1969), American physician and former principal deputy commissioner of the U.S. Food and Drug Administration
- Steven Sharfstein (born 1942), American psychiatrist and past president of the American Psychiatric Association
- Zelig Sharfstein (1928–2008), American Chabad rabbi and Chief Rabbi of Vaad Ho'ir of Cincinnati
- Zevi Scharfstein (1884–1972), Hebrew-language educator, writer and entrepreneur
