= Charity: Water =

Nonprofit organization

charity: water
- Founded: 2006; 20 years ago
- Founder: Scott Harrison
- Type: International NGO
- Location: New York City, New York, U.S.
- Region served: 28 countries in Africa and Asia
- Website: charitywater.org

Charity: water (stylized as charity: water) is a non-profit organization founded in 2006 that provides drinking water to people in developing nations. As of 2025, the organization has raised over $1 billion and provided clean water to over 20 million people. The charity operates a 100 percent model to maximize donations, providing every public dollar donated to funding the organization's water projects. According to the organization, by October 2024, it has funded more than 171,000 projects in 29 countries though it does not know how many of the projects are still functional.

== History ==
The charity was founded in 2006 by a former New York City club promoter Scott Harrison. In 2004, he quit his job to help the poor and marginalized through volunteer service in Liberia with Mercy Ships. Harrison recognized that problems surrounding education, safety, and health may trace back to a lack of clean water and basic sanitation systems.

The aim of the organization was to educate the public about the developing world, and fund projects on the ground that could ease the access to fresh water for the local populations. At the same time, the core of the project is the principle of transparency, so people can freely track and witness how the projects to which they contributed are maintained.

Charity: water's primary fundraising strategy involves persuading donors to give their birthdays to fund wells in Africa (peer-to-peer fundraising), a concept initiated by Harrison in 2006 and repeated in Uganda in 2007. Donors may create a fundraising page, encouraging friends and family to contribute a dollar per birthday year of age instead of gifts. Real-time tracking shows the donated amount, and upon project completion, the charity shares with the donor images, videos, and GPS coordinates of the wells built with their donation. Though expanded to other activities, the birthday initiative remains the most popular fundraiser, with over 120,000 participants.

In its initial 18 months, the charity raised $2.7 million for 481 water projects. On February 9, 2008, Harrison emailed the founders of various social networks, to propose a findraising collaborative effort. His idea involved convincing members born in September to join him in raising funds for the latest project, providing water to people in Ethiopia. The appeal leveraged social networks' knowledge of their members' birthdays. Among others, Harrison contacted Facebook’s Mark Zuckerberg, MySpace’s Tom Anderson and Bebo’s Michael Birch. Birch was the first to respond with monetary, technical assistance, and introductions to influential leaders in Silicon Valley's technology industry. Birch redesigned the charity's website and personally donated $1 million.

Later, the leadership of charity: water recognized the challenge of sustaining their peer-to-peer fundraising, as few birthday fundraisers repeated their efforts. Beginning in 2016, the group shifted its focus to recruiting and retaining sustaining supporters—individuals committing to monthly recurring gifts. In return, these supporters receive continuous updates on the organization's achievements.

== Operations ==
The organization has drilled some 38,000 wells for villagers in Ethiopia, Rwanda and other countries in sub-Saharan Africa and Asia. It has no idea how many of the wells are still functioning, despite initial claims that the wells would provide water for decades. It is sure that some are not working. In 2020, the charity claimed that it provided clean water to more than 10 million people through 44,000 projects in over 28 countries. According to the organization, by the beginning of 2024, it has funded more than 138,000 projects in 29 countries

Charity: water collaborates with local partners to identify optimal locations for water projects. Working closely with committees, they consider factors like community involvement, geography, sustainability, and necessity. Local partners play a crucial role in promoting sanitation and hygiene practices and deciding on the most suitable water project, be it rainwater harvesting, a piped system, a well, or a BioSand Filter. The establishment of these committees not only advances water access but also stimulates local economies by encouraging workforce engagement and community participation.

=== Reporting ===
The organization uses social networks and digital tools, including real-time video and GPS mapping. Donations are linked to specific projects, and fieldwork updates are provided through digital platforms. The organization also uses web-based data tools in its campaigns and donor-project communications. Public reports do not include some performance indicators, such as water-well effectiveness, average travel time to water sources, and the operational status of well projects.

=== Financing ===
Upon the establishment of the organization, Harrison set up two separate bank accounts for donations. One is exclusively dedicated to program costs. Charity: water asserts that 100% of the funds received in this account are spent on program implementation. By 2013, the organization had raised more than $65 million, and recruited more than 300,000 donors. By 2018, the organization had raised $70 million.

Another account is set up for the running-costs of the organization, so people could also donate to pay for the work of the organization's team. Michael Birch became the first sponsor of the Charity: water's operation costs. In 2008, Birch gave to Harrison and his team $1 million. soon more than 100 wealthy digital entrepreneurs joined Birch to support the charity. As of 2019, the donations made to Harrison and his team constituted $11 million. In 2017, Harrison received a salary of $325,278. The organization's "chief water officer" received $293,442.

In 2019, a new program was created to allow entrepreneurs to donate equity to Charity: water. When their companies are sold or go public, some of the proceeds are paid to the charity's employees as bonuses.

=== Partnerships ===
In December 2012, Charity: water received a $5 million grant from Google's Global Impact Awards. The grant was to fund the installation of 4,000 sensors to report on status and working conditions of wells installed in Ethiopia, Nepal, and a few other nations in Africa and Asia.

In 2015, Charity: water partnered with the silicone bracelet company Lokai.

In 2019, the charity set a goal to raise $1 billion, providing clean water access to an additional 25 million people by 2025. Concepts included corporate partners offering sustaining memberships as a co-branded employee benefit, engaging consumers through in-store and digital point-of-sale activities, and shifting corporate support from clean water access to operations. The majority, 80%, of the funding is expected from various types of individual support, with $200 million from expanded brand partnerships.

== Fundraising ==
=== charity:ball ===
For over a decade, the organization has hosted an annual lavish gala that raises millions from high net worth individuals. In 2015, it held its first black-tie gala, at The Metropolitan Museum of Art's Temple of Dendur. At the 2017 gala, organizers visited Ethiopia to take photos of children that could be matched with gala attendees.

=== Ride for Water ===
Ride for Water is an annual fundraiser that started in 2013 and involves cycling across the United States to raise awareness for the charity. In 2019 the team completed a 52 day journey. The 3,437-mile trip started on May 20 and traversed 12 states from coast to coast and raised $25,000 on the day of completion. From 2013 through to 2015 the team only included males. In 2016, teams of men and women rode separately for much of the journey but then joined up for the final stretch to New York. The Ride for Water initiative is loosely affiliated with Azusa Pacific University because the first time it took place it was arranged by a group of graduates.

== Reception ==
Charity evaluator GiveWell published a review of the organization in December 2012. Their overall conclusion was that it "stands out from other organizations we have considered in some respects (such as conducting evaluations that include frank discussions of problems), but we remain uncertain about the humanitarian impact of their work and the relative effectiveness of their partner selection process." In January 2013, an article by Anne Elizabeth Moore on Truthout stated that "questions about its impact and methods remain" and that "transparency may keep critics at bay, yet what remains unclear is exactly how many more people have reliable access to clean drinking water now than did six years ago."

As of July 2021, Charity Navigator rated the organization at 4 out of 4 stars. The charity had an overall rating of 91.95 out of 100 with an "Accountability & Transparency" score of the maximum 100 and "Financial" rating of 88.62 as of July 2021. Guidestar gave the organization a "Platinum Seal of Transparency".
