= Laura's Law =

California state law allowing for court-ordered assisted outpatient treatment

Laura's Law is a California state law that allows for court-ordered assisted outpatient treatment. To qualify for the program, the person must have a serious mental illness plus a recent history of psychiatric hospitalizations, jailings or acts, threats or attempts of serious violent behavior towards self or others.

The law was named after Laura Wilcox, a receptionist who was killed by a man who had refused psychiatric treatment. Modeled on Kendra's Law, a similar statute enacted in New York, the bill was introduced as Assembly Bill 1421 by Assemblywoman Helen Thomson, a Democrat from Davis. The measure passed the California Legislature in 2002 and was signed into law by Governor Gray Davis. The statute can only be used in counties that choose to enact outpatient commitment programs based on the measure.

== Background ==
Laura Wilcox was a 19-year-old college sophomore who had been valedictorian of her high school before going on to study at Haverford College. While working at Nevada County's public mental health clinic during her winter break from college, on January 10, 2001, she and two other people were shot to death by Scott Harlan Thorpe, a 40-year-old man who resisted his family's and a social worker's attempt to have him hospitalized when he became increasingly delusional and paranoid. Thorpe was found incompetent to stand trial and was sent to Atascadero State Hospital and was later transferred to California's Napa State Hospital. After the killings, Laura's parents chose to advocate for assisted outpatient treatment of individuals considered to have mental illness.

== Implementation at county discretion ==
The law is only operative in those counties in which the county board of supervisors, by resolution, authorizes its application and makes a finding that no voluntary mental health program serving adults, and no children's mental health program, was reduced in order to implement the law.

In November 2004, California voters passed Proposition 63, the Mental Health Services Act (MHSA). The California Department of Mental Health (DMH) released its draft plan requirements for county mental health administrators on February 15, 2005 and included a provision that would allow MHSA funds to be used for "involuntary services" if certain criteria were met.

In 2004, Los Angeles County implemented Laura's Law on a limited basis. Since passage of MHSA, Laura's Law provisions have been implemented in Kern County, Los Angeles County, Nevada County, Orange County, Placer County, San Diego County, San Mateo County, Yolo County, Contra Costa County, the City and County of San Francisco, Ventura County, San Luis Obispo County, Alameda County and Mendocino County

By 2010, Nevada County, where the shootings took place, fully implemented the law. In 2010 the California State Association of Counties chose Nevada County to receive its Challenge Award for implementing Laura's Law. In 2011 a National Association of Counties Achievement Award in Health was awarded to Nevada County for the Assisted Outpatient Treatment Program.

Marin County launched a two-year pilot program for Laura's Law on September 4, 2018. Santa Clara County adopted the provisions on May 25, 2021, at which time 21 out of 58 counties had opted in. Legislation in 2020 required counties to participate or explicitly opt out by July 1, 2021. Counties may choose to participate or opt-out of the program at the beginning of each fiscal year.

In those counties that adopt outpatient commitment, the process will ensure individuals are provided the services, medical treatment and medication that will enable the person to have a good chance to recover. Nevada County Director Michael Heggarty described it as part of the recovery movement.

== Assisted outpatient treatment eligibility criteria ==
To be eligible under Laura's Law, a patient must have a serious mental illness plus a recent history of psychiatric hospitalizations, jailings or acts, threats or attempts of serious violent behavior towards self or others. The recipient must also have been offered an opportunity to voluntarily participate in a treatment plan by the local mental health department, yet fails to the point that, without a Laura's Law program, he or she will likely relapse or deteriorate to the point of being dangerous to self or others. "Participation in the assisted outpatient program is the least restrictive placement necessary to ensure the person's recovery and stability." While a specified group of individuals may request an investigation to determine if a person qualifies for a Laura's Law program, only the County mental health director, or his or her designee, may file a petition with the superior court for a hearing to determine if the person should be court ordered to receive the services specified under the law.

A person may be placed in an assisted outpatient treatment if, after a hearing, a court finds that the following criteria have been met. The patient must:

- Be eighteen years of age or older
- Be suffering from a mental illness
- Be unlikely to survive safely in the community without supervision, based on a clinical determination
- Have a history of non-compliance with treatment that has either:
1. Been a significant factor in his or her being in a hospital, prison or jail at least twice within the last thirty-six months; or
2. Resulted in one or more acts, attempts or threats of serious violent behavior toward self or others within the last forty-eight months
- Have been offered an opportunity to voluntarily participate in a treatment plan by the local mental health department but continue to fail to engage in treatment
- Be substantially deteriorating
- Be, in view of his or her treatment history and current behavior, in need of assisted outpatient treatment in order to prevent a relapse or deterioration that would likely result in the person meeting California's inpatient commitment standard, which is being:
1. A serious risk of harm to himself or herself or others; or
2. Gravely disabled (in immediate physical danger due to being unable to meet basic needs for food, clothing, or shelter);
- Be likely to benefit from assisted outpatient treatment; and
- Participation in the assisted outpatient program is the least restrictive placement necessary to ensure the person's recovery and stability.

If the court finds that the individual meets the statutory criteria, the recipient will be provided intensive community treatment services and supervision by multidisciplinary teams of highly trained mental health professionals with staff-to-client ratios of not more than 1 to 10, and additional services, as specified, for persons with the most persistent and severe mental illness. The law specifies various rights of the person who is the subject of a Laura's Law petition as well as due process hearing rights. The bill also provides for voluntary settlement agreements as an alternative to the hearing process.

== Debate over bill's efficacy and propriety ==
=== Supporters ===
Passage of the bill was supported by organizations such as the California Treatment Advocacy Coalition (an affiliate of the Treatment Advocacy Center), the California Psychiatric Association, the Police Chiefs Association, Mental Illness Policy Org. and the National Alliance on Mental Illness (NAMI). In an editorial endorsement of the law, the Los Angeles Times touted then-Governor Gray Davis's support, while limiting its comments on opponents to mentioning that the Citizens Commission on Human Rights which opposes virtually all psychiatric treatments, sponsored a rally at the Capitol against Laura's law. The San Francisco Chronicle and The San Francisco Examiner have published positive articles on the topic. The Los Angeles Times won a Pulitzer Prize, in part for its coverage of Laura's Law.

=== Opposition ===
MindFreedom International and the California Network of Mental Health Clients (CNMHC), along with allies in the psychiatric survivors movement, also fought the measure and its earlier versions, accusing such legislation as a regressive and reprehensible scheme to enforce coerced drug treatment regimens against the will of patients. The Church of Scientology and the Citizens Commission on Human Rights have also gained attention as an opponent of the new law.

Outpatient commitment opponents make several varied arguments. Some dispute the positive effects of compulsory treatment, questioning the methodology of studies that show effectiveness. Others highlight negative effects of treatment. Still others point to disparities in the way these laws are applied. The psychiatric survivors movement opposes compulsory treatment on the basis that the ordered drugs often have serious or unpleasant side-effects such as anhedonia, tardive dyskinesia, neuroleptic malignant syndrome, excessive weight gain leading to diabetes, addiction, sexual side effects, and increased risk of suicide.

John M. Grohol, Psy.D., in his article "The Double Standard of Forced Treatment", says "Forced treatment for people with mental illness has had a long and abusive history, both here in the United States and throughout the world. No other medical specialty has the rights psychiatry and psychology do to take away a person's freedom in order to help "treat" that person. Historically, the profession has suffered from abusing this right — so much so that reform laws in the 1970s and 1980s took the profession's right away from them to confine people against their will. Such forced treatment now requires a judge's signature. But over time, that judicial oversight — which is supposed to be the check in our checks-and-balance system — has largely become a rubber stamp to whatever the doctor thinks is best. The patient's voice once again threatens to become silenced, now under the guise of "assisted outpatient treatment" (just a modern, different term for forced treatment)."

The New Mexico Court of Appeals declared an Albuquerque ordinance, modeled after Kendra's Law, requiring treatment for some mentally ill people conflicts with state law and can't be enforced.

==== Tom Burns ====
Tom Burns, the psychiatrist who originally advised the United Kingdom's government on laws that are similar to Laura's Law, has also come to the conclusion they are ineffective and unnecessary. Professor Burns, once a strong supporter of the new powers, said he has been forced to change his mind after a study he conducted proved the orders "don't work".

However, Burns' opinion was based heavily on his (very different) circumstances in the United Kingdom. The study he conducted found that coerced treatment was no better than regular/competent un-coerced treatment (the standard in the United Kingdom, which has public healthcare). As a result, the bulk of his argument does not apply to California, where the alternative to coerced treatment in most cases is no treatment at all. Professor Burns himself admitted that: "We were careful in our Lancet article to say that in well-coordinated mental health services, compulsory treatment has nothing to offer" (emphasis added).

Burns went on to highlight another critical difference between the two systems, and even mentioned that as a psychiatrist under a European system he would be willing to order coercive treatment under circumstances similar to the ones described by Laura's Law: "There's a profound conceptual difference in the approach to mental health care between America and Europe. European laws often state "danger to self or others," but danger in Europe is almost always interpreted very broadly — and you might think paternalistically — to include the patient's mental health. If I have a seriously ill schizophrenic patient who is neglecting himself, not taking his medicine, and I know he's going to get worse, I can say that's a "danger" to his health. My understanding is that in many states in America, it's got to be an imminent physical risk."

== Studies ==
As a result of the opposition to Kendra's Law, similar in nature to Laura's Law, two studies were conducted on Kendra's Law and found favorable outcomes. One study of Assisted Outpatient Treatment within the United States and another study done by a previous proponent of AOT type laws in the United Kingdom did not.

A 2005 study, Kendra's Law A Final Report on the Status of Assisted Outpatient Treatment done by New York State's Office of Mental Health, found:

Reduced Incidence of Harmful Behaviors Percent of Persons with One or More Events Reported in the Past 90 Days
Percent of Assisted Outpatient Treatment (AOT) Recipients with Harmful Behaviors
	At Onset of AOT Court Order	At Six Months	Percent Reduction in Harmful Behaviors
Physically Harm Self/Made Suicide Attempt	9%	4%	55%
Abuse Alcohol	45%	23%	49%
Abuse Drugs	44%	23%	48%
Threaten Suicide	15%	8%	47%
Physically Harm Others	15%	8%	47%
Damage or Destroy Property	13%	7%	46%
Threaten Physical Harm	28%	16%	43%
Create Public Disturbances	24%	15%	38%
Verbally Assault Others	33%	21%	36%
Theft	7%	5%	29%
Average Percent Reduction			44%

(Table taken directly from source and converted to Wikipedia Table Template)

A 2009 study, New York State Assisted Outpatient Treatment Evaluation done by Duke University, Policy Research Associates, University of Virginia, found:

	No current or recent AOT (n=134)		Current AOT (n=115)
Outcome events (past six months)	N	%	N	%
Violent behavior	21	(15.7)	12	(10.4)
Suicidal thoughts or attempts	22	(16.4)	17	(14.8)
Homelessness	13	(9.7)	6	(5.2)
Involuntary commitment	54	(43.2)	46	(41.4)
Mental health pick-up/removal	25	(18.7)	16	(13.9)

(Table taken directly from source and converted to Wikipedia Table Template)

The study, Compulsory community and involuntary outpatient treatment for people with severe mental disorders by Steve R Kisely, Leslie Anne Campbell, Neil J Preston published at The Cochrane Library found:

We identified two randomised clinical trials (total n = 416) of court-ordered 'Outpatient Commitment' (OPC) from the USA. We found little evidence that compulsory community treatment was effective in any of the main outcome indices: health service use (2 RCTs, n = 416, RR for readmission to hospital by 11-12 months 0.98 CI 0.79 to 1.2); social functioning (2 RCTs, n = 416, RR for arrested at least once by 11-12 months 0.97 CI 0.62 to 1.52); mental state; quality of life (2 RCTs, n = 416, RR for homelessness 0.67 CI 0.39 to 1.15) or satisfaction with care (2 RCTs, n = 416, RR for perceived coercion 1.36 CI 0.97 to 1.89). However, risk of victimisation may decrease with OPC (1 RCT, n = 264, RR 0.5 CI 0.31 to 0.8). In terms of numbers needed to treat (NNT), it would take 85 OPC orders to prevent one readmission, 27 to prevent one episode of homelessness and 238 to prevent one arrest. The NNT for the reduction of victimisation was lower at six (CI 6 to 6.5). A new search for trials in 2008 did not find any new trials that were relevant to this review.

The results of this study also did not support the usefulness of compulsory outpatient treatment: Community treatment orders (CTOs) for patients with psychosis (OCTET): a randomised controlled trial done by Professor Tom Burns DSc, Jorun Rugkåsa PhD, Andrew Molodynski MBChB, John Dawson LLD, Ksenija Yeeles BSc, Maria Vazquez-Montes PhD, Merryn Voysey MBiostat, Julia Sinclair DPhil, and Professor Stefan Priebe FRCPsych found:

Of 442 patients assessed, 336 patients were randomly assigned to be discharged from hospital either on CTO (167 patients) or Section 17 leave (169 patients). One patient withdrew directly after randomisation and two were ineligible, giving a total sample of 333 patients (166 in the CTO group and 167 in the Section 17 group). At 12 months, despite the fact that the length of initial compulsory outpatient treatment differed significantly between the two groups (median 183 days CTO group vs 8 days Section 17 group, p<0·001) the number of patients readmitted did not differ between groups (59 [36%] of 166 patients in the CTO group vs 60 [36%] of 167 patients in the Section 17 group; adjusted relative risk 1·0 [95% CI 0·75—1·33]).

== See also ==
- 2001 Nevada County shootings, the shooting spree which led to the law being implemented
- Kendra's Law, assisted outpatient treatment law in NY on which Laura's law is based
- Gun Violence Restraining Order, a gun control to temporarily remove firearms from people who may present a danger
- 5150 (Involuntary psychiatric hold), California's law for psychiatric emergencies
- Baker Act, a Florida law of similar operation
- involuntary commitment, which is hospital-based
- Involuntary treatment, which is independent of setting
- anti-psychiatry, a movement that opposes any form of involuntary psychiatric treatment
- Outpatient commitment
