= 2001 Nevada County shootings =

Shooting spree in Nevada County, California

- Date: January 10, 2001 ≈11:28 – 11:37 a.m. (PST)
- Attack type: Mass shooting, mass murder, spree shooting
- Weapon: 9mm Ruger Semi-automatic pistol
- Deaths: 3
- Injuries: 3 (2 by gunfire)
- Perpetrator: Scott Harlan Thorpe

On January 10, 2001, a shooting spree took place in Nevada County, California, when 40-year-old Scott Harlan Thorpe opened fire with a 9mm Ruger semi-automatic pistol killing three people and wounding three others in two separate shootings in the Nevada County area. The victims were 19-year-old Laura Wilcox, 68-year-old Pearlie Mae Feldman, and 24-year-old Mike Markle. The shooting spree led to the implementation of Laura's Law, a California state law that allows for court-ordered assisted outpatient treatment. The law was named after Laura Wilcox, one of the victims of the shooting spree. Michael Moore's 2002 documentary film Bowling for Columbine was dedicated to Wilcox's memory.

== Shootings ==
Just before 11:30 a.m. on January 10, 2001, 40-year-old Scott Harlan Thorpe (born April 1, 1960) of Sacramento walked into the Nevada County Department of Behavioral Health in Nevada City, California. Thorpe walked up to the first-floor reception counter armed with a 9mm Ruger semi-automatic pistol. Thorpe was a client of the outpatient mental health clinic and suffered from paranoia and agoraphobia. At the time, he was seeking treatment at the clinic for help with his illnesses and was undergoing monthly mental health counseling for his agoraphobia. Unhappy with the care he had been receiving, an enraged Thorpe fired through a glass panel with his gun and fatally shot the temporary receptionist, 19-year-old Laura Wilcox, a college student who was helping out at the Department of Behavioral Health during her winter break. He then shot at several other people around him, one of whom was 68-year-old Pearlie Mae Feldman, a mental health caregiver. She was fatally wounded by Thorpe. Another person was shot three times and injured in the head, lungs, esophagus, and right shoulder during the shooting, while a fourth person jumped from a window to escape the gunfire and suffered a broken pelvis and other injuries.

Thorpe then fled the scene in a blue van and drove for three miles towards Lyon's Restaurant in nearby Grass Valley. Less than ten minutes later, Thorpe arrived at the restaurant and headed inside. He then fatally shot the manager, 24-year-old Mike Markle, who had begun work at the restaurant just days before. At the time of his death, Markle had a five-year-old daughter and a son who was nearly three years old. Thorpe also shot the restaurant's cook seven times, injuring him in the stomach and arms. He then fled the scene.

== Aftermath ==
After the shootings, Thorpe returned to his home in Smartsville where he lived alone at the time of the shooting. Thorpe made a phone call to his brother, who was a Sacramento County sheriff's deputy, and confessed over the phone to him about what he had done. Thorpe's brother notified Nevada County authorities and helped them in apprehending his brother. Authorities arrested Thorpe at his home around 9 p.m. later that day, where he surrendered peacefully after a three-hour standoff. Thorpe carried out the shooting as he was unhappy with the care he was receiving at the clinic. He also said he carried out the shooting at the restaurant because he was convinced they had been poisoning him. Thorpe was found incompetent to stand trial and was declared not guilty by reason of insanity. He was initially sent to Atascadero State Hospital but was later transferred to California's Napa State Hospital for the mentally ill where he currently resides.

== Laura's Law ==
As a result of the shooting, Laura's Law was implemented. It is a California state law that allows for court-ordered assisted outpatient treatment. To qualify for the program, the person must have a serious mental illness plus a recent history of psychiatric hospitalizations, jailings or acts, threats or attempts of serious violent behavior towards themself or others.

== See also ==
- List of homicides in California
