= Harriet Shetler =

Co-founder of the American National Alliance on Mental Illness

- Born: August 1, 1917; Leechburg, Pennsylvania
- Died: March 30, 2010 (aged 92); Madison, Wisconsin
- Education: Monmouth College (BA)
- Occupations: Journalist, Advocate
- Known for: Co-founder of the (American) National Alliance on Mental Illness
- Children: 2

Harriet Jane Shetler (August 1, 1917 – March 30, 2010) was a co-founder of the (American) National Alliance on Mental Illness, which was described in 1999 by Steven Hyman, the director of the National Institute of Mental Health, as "the greatest single advocacy force in mental health."

She was also a peace activist during the late 1960s and early 1970s.

== Formative years and family ==
Born as Harriet Jane McCown in Leechburg, Pennsylvania on August 1, 1917, and raised in that community, she graduated from Monmouth College (Illinois) in 1938.

In 1941, she was an active member of the Junior Woman's Club.

She married Charles Shetler (1918–2010) in 1943. During their marriage, their son developed schizophrenia, which would ultimately lead her to become a nationally recognized advocate for improvements to mental health treatment and support services across the United States.

During the 1960s and early 1970s, she continued her volunteer philanthropic work and activism as a member of the Women's International League for Peace and Freedom in Madison, Wisconsin, where she resided with her family.

In 1971, she served on the board of directors of the university YWCA in Madison. She was also active with the University League during the 1970s.

== Career ==
During the early part of her professional life, Harriet Shetler worked as a reporter and editor in the newspaper industry, as well as in scientific and industrial magazine publishing. She was also employed by the University of Wisconsin's extension service during the early 1970s.

Together with Beverly Young, Shetler subsequently founded what would ultimately become the National Alliance on Mental Illness in Madison, Wisconsin in 1977.

Initially named as the Alliance for Mentally Ill, their organization held its first meeting at the Dane County Mental Health Center in Madison on Wednesday, September 14, 1977, at 7:30 p.m., and then held subsequent meetings at various locations in the city, including the library of the Midvale Lutheran Church. That same month, she was elected to a three-year term on the board of directors of the Leigh Roberts Halfway House in Madison. On October 12, 1977, the Alliance for Mentally Ill sponsored a lecture by Dr. Leonard Stein, the medical director of the Dane County Mental Health Center. His talk addressed research findings at the time regarding the potential causes of schizophrenia and possible treatments for the disease. On November 3 of that same year, Shetler was quoted in the Wisconsin State Journal as saying the proposed budget of $4,182,522 for the county's Community Mental Health Services Board was too low and only amounted to roughly $1.60 per county resident to support "the chronically mentally ill, the most neglected and disliked people in our county; yet I spent four times that amount Halloween night passing out candy to neighborhood kids in Nakoma." On November 9, the group met at the Madison Opportunity Center for a talk by rehabilitation counselor Bruce Beck, who spoke about the center's "sheltered workshop for the mentally ill and handicapped."

On July 12, 1978, the group held its meeting at Madison's Midvale Community Lutheran Church, which featured a lecture by Dr. Ronald J. Diamond, an assistant professor of psychiatry at the University of Wisconsin who also served as a psychiatrist with the Dane County Mental Health Center's Day Treatment Service. He presented information about the community-based mental health services that were being delivered at that time in Denver, Colorado, New York City, Oxnard, California, and Philadelphia, Pennsylvania. In September of that year, she and her colleagues advocated in support of a $6.2 million budget request made to county supervisors by he County Community Mental Health Board. When interviewed by the Wisconsin State Journal, she noted that her group was particularly urging county leaders' support for a $300,000 request to fund day care treatment services for chronically mentally ill residents of the county to ensure that they were taking the correct medication and living in the best possible conditions with respect to their individual diagnoses.

By 1979, Shetler was editing and publishing a monthly newsletter for the Alliance for Mentally Ill while working to raise the organization's profile and educate members of the general public about the need for improved mental health care services through interviews with Madison-area newspapers.

On September 6, 1980, she was a panelist for a mental health conference that was presented jointly by the Alliance for Mentally Ill, the Mental Health Association of Dane County, and the Coalition of Providers for the Chronically Mentally Ill. Held at the First Congregational Church in Madison, the free program, which focused on the stigma faced by mentally ill individuals and their families, was entitled "These Are Our Neighbors." Open to the general public, it featured a keynote address by Sue E. Estroff, a postdoctoral researcher in the University of Wisconsin-Madison's department of psychiatry, who had recently written the book, Making It Crazy: An Ethnography of Psychiatric Clients in a Community Setting.

Shetler retired in 1982, and was preceded in death by her husband, to whom she had been married for sixty-seven years.

== Death ==
Shetler died in Madison, Wisconsin on March 30, 2010. She was survived by two children and two grandchildren.
