= Joshua Sharfstein =

American public health official

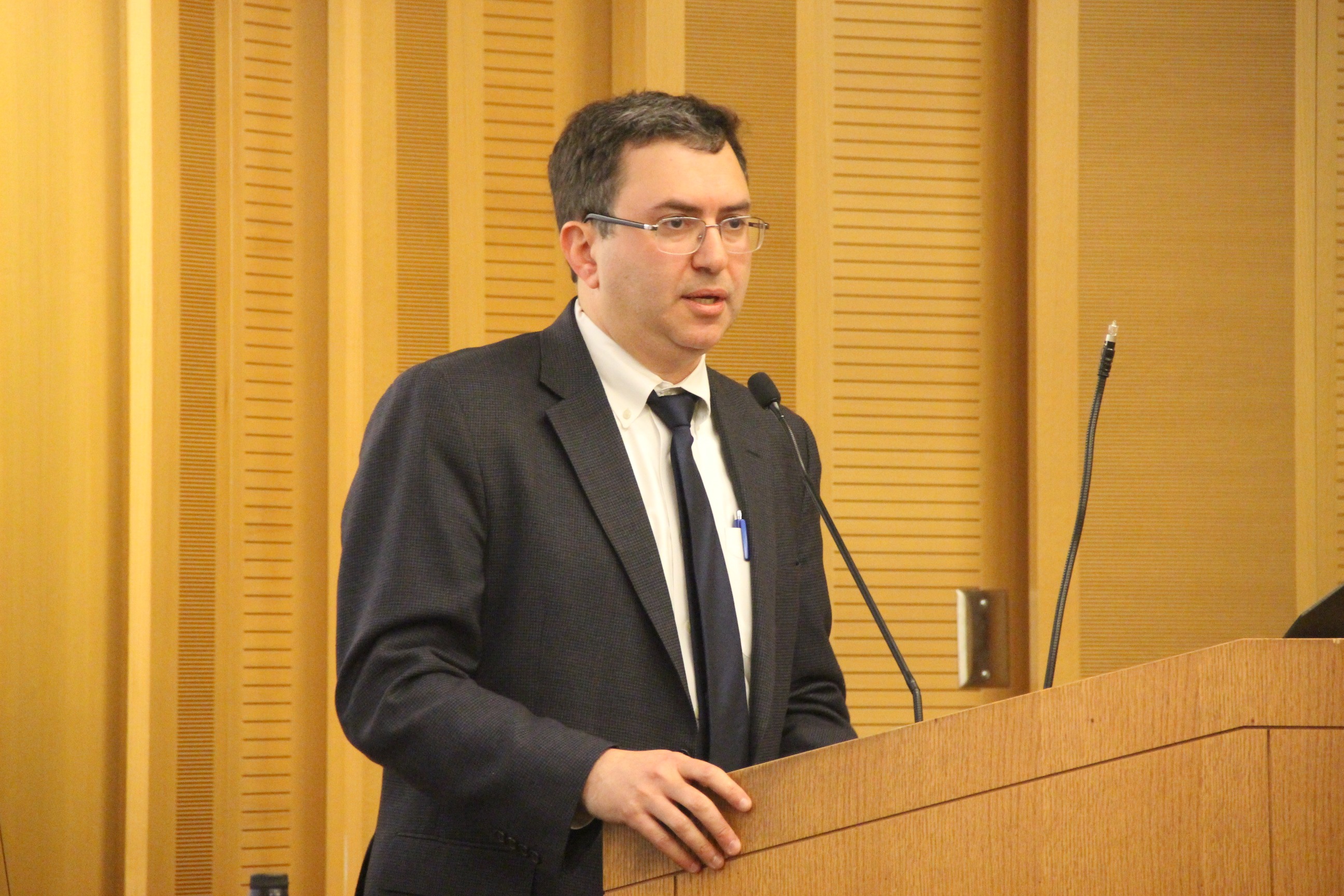
- Born: 1969 (age 56–57)
- Education: Harvard University (BS, MD)
- Employers: Johns Hopkins Bloomberg School of Public Health; Maryland Department of Health

Joshua M. Sharfstein (born 1969) is a physician and the current Vice Dean for Public Health Practice and Community Engagement at the Johns Hopkins Bloomberg School of Public Health. He was Secretary of the Maryland Department of Health from 2011 to 2014, and was principal deputy commissioner of the U.S. Food and Drug Administration until he stepped down from his post on January 5, 2011. He is the former health commissioner of Baltimore, Maryland.

== Life and career ==
A native of Maryland, Sharfstein graduated from Harvard College in 1991. In the fall of 1992, he entered Harvard Medical School, from where he graduated in 1996. He did his residency in pediatrics through a joint program at Boston Children's Hospital and Boston Medical Center, completing a special pediatrics fellowship with Boston University.

Sharfstein then left Boston for Washington, D. C., where he joined the Democratic staff of the House Government Reform Committee and served as health policy advisor to Congressman Henry A. Waxman. Among the issues he worked on were HIV/AIDS, oversight of the Food and Drug Administration (FDA), tobacco, and public health.

After the election of President Barack Obama in 2008, Sharfstein served as leader of the Obama transition team on the FDA. Media reports indicated he was a finalist to become FDA commissioner in the new administration, but instead he was appointed by President Obama in 2009 as Principal Deputy Commissioner of the FDA.

Sharfstein, whose early work in politics included work for Public Citizen's Health Watch, has been a frequent critic of drug industry marketing practices—going all the way back to his days in medical training. During his time as public health commissioner of Baltimore, he led the effort to restrict the marketing of pediatric cold remedies.

Sharfstein has also written articles criticizing the American Medical Association for its pattern of giving campaign contributions to political candidates that take stands the majority of physicians oppose. One of those articles focused on AMA donations to candidates and elected officials who have fought the regulation of tobacco—a position the medical community generally favors and that Sharfstein has advocated over the years.

Although Sharfstein's candidacy for a top FDA post raised concerns among some special interest groups—the Wall Street Journal reported on an "Anybody But Sharfstein" memo placed in circulation, apparently at the behest of drug companies. He has also come under the ire of anti-vaccine groups because, consistent with the advice of the American Academy of Pediatrics and the vast majority of medical professionals, he has been an ardent supporter of vaccines as an essential part of public health.

Both of Sharfstein's parents are physicians. His father Steven Sharfstein is a former president of the American Psychiatric Association.

After less than two years on the job, FDA deputy commissioner Josh Sharfstein left the agency to become the Secretary of Health and Mental Hygiene in Maryland. In 2014, Sharfstein announced that he would leave his position as secretary of the Maryland state Department of Health and Mental Hygiene to become associate Dean at the Johns Hopkins Bloomberg School of Public Health. Sharfstein currently hosts the Bloomberg School of Public Health podcast, Public Health on Call.

== Publications ==
- Torrey, E. Fuller; Stieber, Joan; Ezekiel, Jonathan; Wolfe, Sidney M; Sharfstein, Joshua; Noble, John H; Flynn, Laurie M (1992), Criminalizing the Seriously Mentally Ill: The Abuse of Jails as Mental Hospitals, A joint report of the National Alliance for the Mentally Ill and Public Citizen's Health Research Group, ISBN 0-7881-4279-8
