= Treatment Advocacy Center =

U.S. non-profit organization

The Treatment Advocacy Center (TAC) is a U.S. non-profit organization based in Alexandria, Virginia, originally announced as the NAMI Treatment Advocacy Center in 1997. TAC was subsequently directed by psychiatrist E. Fuller Torrey and identifies its mission as "dedicated to eliminating barriers to the timely and effective treatment of severe mental illness," which is an umbrella term that includes the most serious of psychiatric disorders, including schizophrenia spectrum disorders, severe bipolar disorder, and major depression with psychotic features. The organization is most well-known for proposed laws, policies, and practices regarding legally compelled outpatient services or outpatient commitment (also known as assisted outpatient treatment, AOT) for people diagnosed with mental illness. The organization identifies its other key issues as "anosognosia, consequences of non-treatment, criminalization of severe mental illness, psychiatric bed shortages, public service costs, violence and severe mental illness".

== History ==
Although according to the TAC website, E. Fuller Torrey founded the Treatment Advocacy Center in 1998 as an offshoot of the National Alliance on Mental Illness (NAMI), other sources indicate that the original name was the NAMI Treatment Action Center. Laurie Flynn, the NAMI director at the time, stated in a press release, "It's a national disgrace that, in this age of remarkable progress in brain research and treatment, so many individuals are left out in the cold". TAC received initial financial support from Theodore and Vada Stanley, founders of the Stanley Medical Research Institute; TAC was founded as an affiliate organization with a separate executive director and board. The organization operates with funding from the affiliated Stanley Medical Research Institute, a non-profit organization which provides funding for research into bipolar disorder and schizophrenia in the United States. Torrey is currently a member of the Treatment Advocacy Center's board and is executive director of the Stanley Medical Research Institute. The relationship between Torrey and NAMI seemed to sour according to sources, with Torrey being disinvited from NAMI's national convention in 2012 after advocates protested his TAC involvement and promotion of outpatient commitment.

== Organization ==
=== Areas of focus ===
The Treatment Advocacy Center activities and projects include:

- Developed a template law for court-ordered outpatient mental health treatment. Released in 2000, the draft text is meant as a legal framework for authorizing court-ordered treatment of individuals diagnosed with severe mental illness who are determined by the court to meet certain legal criteria around dangerousness to self or others or inability to care for oneself due to a mental illness.
- Research and study into public policy and other issues related specific to severe mental illness.
- Education of policymakers and judges regarding TAC's viewpoint on severe mental illness; TAC's opinion is that court-ordered treatment is necessary for a full continuum of mental health care and increases in outpatient services options including AOT and an increase in state hospital beds will improve care.

=== Funding ===
Donors to the Treatment Advocacy Center include David Baszucki and National Life Group.

== Controversy ==
Advocates for mental health have criticized TAC for endorsing coercion and forced treatment. TAC's major focus on court-ordered treatment is opposed by some other advocacy groups. The Bazelon Center for Mental Health Law in a statement on forced treatment states "not only is forced treatment a serious rights violation, it is counterproductive. Fear of being deprived of autonomy discourages people from seeking care. Coercion undermines therapeutic relationships and long-term treatment." Daniel Fischer, founder of National Coalition for Mental Health Recovery, described outpatient commitment as "a slippery slope" back to the kind of mass institutionalization seen in the 1940s and '50s".

== See also ==
- Deinstitutionalization
- Kendra's Law
- Laura's Law
- Outpatient commitment
- Psychiatric hospital
