= Scott Harrison (charity founder) =

American non-profit executive

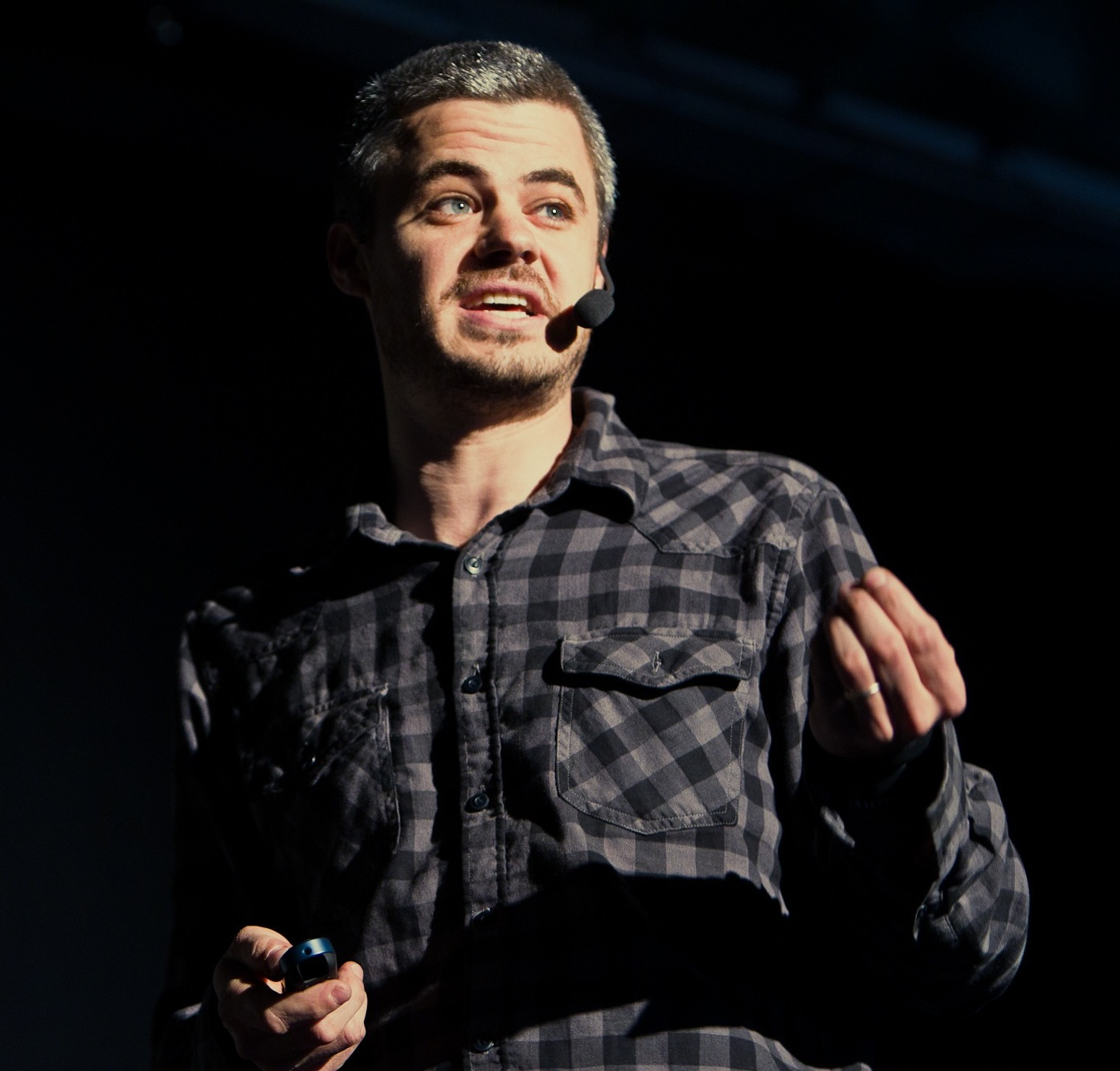
- Harrison speaking in 2010.
- Born: September 7, 1975 (age 50); Philadelphia, Pennsylvania, United States
- Education: New York University
- Spouse: Viktoria Harrison (née Alexeeva)
- Website: www.charitywater.org

Scott Harrison (born September 7, 1975) is the founder and current CEO of the non-profit charity: water. Harrison is the author of Thirst: A Story of Redemption, Compassion, and a Mission to Bring Clean Water to the World.

== Early life and career ==
Scott Harrison was born in Philadelphia, Pennsylvania and grew up in Hunterdon County, New Jersey. His father was a businessman, and his mother had been suffering almost constantly from a number of debilitating illnesses since he was four. At the age of 18, Harrison left to study design and communication at New York University. Soon, he became involved in organizing parties and eventually worked as a promoter in Manhattan. He spent the next 10 years organizing parties for the likes of MTV, VH1, Bacardi and Elle.

In 2004, Harrison took a trip to Uruguay. During his visit, he had a "life-changing experience" (a shooting at a nightclub) and began seeking a "change in life." He was inspired to do so by his father’s gift of A.W. Tozer’s book, The Pursuit of God.

Soon, Harrison quit his job and started volunteering as a photojournalist for the Christian charity Mercy Ships, which operates a fleet of hospital ships offering free healthcare to the developing world. He had to pay around $500 a month to cover living expenses. Despite having a high salary in the past, Harrison was almost broke at that stage. According to him, "nightclub promoters are terrible at saving money, but great at spending it." Some of his friends financially supported him during this period.

== Charity: water ==
During the time spent at Mercy Ships, Harrison shipped to Benin and Liberia. He was exposed to the conditions of the impoverished in Liberia. During his volunteering time, Harrison realized that he could leverage his social networks and connections in New York to raise money. In 2006, Harrison organized a party in one of Manhattan's clubs, charging $20 (£12) for entry, with the promise that all the money raised would go toward drilling wells in Africa. The event successfully raised $15,000. That work led to the establishment of Charity: water, a non-profit organization focused on clean water in developing nations.

Charity: water gained popularity among the New York elite, both due to Harrison's personal connections and its use of social networks and digital tools. Charity: water claims to spend 100% of its funding on program costs. At the same time, to support the work of the charity's staff, Harrison established a separate fund for donations. In 2017 alone, he received $325,278 as compensation for his work.

== Personal life ==
Harrison is married to Viktoria Harrison, who was previously involved in design and branding for charity: water. They have three children. Harrison is a Christian.

In 2018, Harrison published a memoir titled Thirst. The book became a New York Times bestseller.

== Publications ==
- Harrison, Scott; Sweetingham, Lisa (2018). Thirst: A Story of Redemption, Compassion, and a Mission to Bring Clean Water to the World. Currency. ISBN 9781524762841. OCLC 1052621664.
