= Frederick Frese =

American psychologist (1940 -2018)

Frederick J. Frese III (October 3, 1940 – July 16, 2018) was an American psychologist, and an advocate for the mentally ill. In 1968, Frese was diagnosed with schizophrenia, and ordered to live the rest of his life in the Ohio State Psychiatric System. In 1980, Frese was promoted to the Director of Psychology of the Western Reserve Psychiatric Rehabilitation Center. One of the first schizophrenic psychologists to publicly diagnosis, Frese was a leading voice for the rights of the mentally ill. Over the course of 30 years, Frese gave 2,000 speeches in 48 states and several countries. In 2015, Frese was featured as one of CNN's "Mental Health Warriors".

== Career ==
Frederick Frese served in the U.S. Marine Corps from 1962 to 1966, achieving the rank of Captain. In March, 1966 Fred was diagnosed with schizophrenia and involuntarily committed. After his first hospitalization, Frese attended Thunderbird Graduate School, and was employed by Koehring Corporation. He experienced a second psychiatric break in 1967, and was hospitalized three times in Milwaukee, San Antonio, and Montgomery. Frese's third breakdown occurred while living with a friend in Columbus, Ohio, and Frese was placed in the Columbus State Hospital where he remained for four months. After his release in 1968, a friend was able to secure Frese a position as a psychologist at The Treatment Research Center of the Ohio Division of Psychiatric Criminology, located within the Chillicothe Correctional Center. Frese enrolled in graduate courses at Ohio University in 1971. He completed his PhD in psychophysiology and received his PhD in psychology in 1979. Frese began work at the Western Reserve Psychiatric Rehabilitation Center in 1977, and was promoted to Director of psychology in 1980, where he remained until 1993.

In 1986, Frese became the founding chairman of Community and State Hospital Psychologists, a section of Division 18 of the American Psychological Association. Frese revealed his diagnosis during a speech at the annual convention of the American Psychological Association in 1989, and began his career as an advocate for the rights of the mentally ill. He published extensively, and was on the advisory review boards of professional journals, including Schizophrenia Bulletin. In 1992, Frese served as president of the National Mental Health Consumers Association, and in 1995 was elected as a member of the Board of Directors of the National Alliance on Mental Illness. Following a two-year period as Clinical director of an assertive community treatment team, Frese retired from his position as Director of Psychology in order to focus on his advocacy work. During his career, he delivered more than 2,000 invited presentations on serious mental illness in some 48 states as well as in Canada, Japan, Australia and Europe. He made appearances on CNN, NPR, Nightline, the ABC Evening News, and was a featured interviewee in Robert Bilheimer's 1996 film, I'm Still Here, the Truth About Schizophrenia. Frese was the only person elected to the NAMI board of directors three times. He was awarded the Presidential Citation from the American Psychological Association in 2005, and the National Mental Health's Clifford Beers Award in 2010.

== Family history ==
Frederick Frese was the oldest of the five children born to Dr. Frederick Joseph Frese Jr. and Katheryn Ruth Sullivan Frese. Frese's father was a scientist with the military's space medicine program, and moved with his family to military bases around the country, but Frese spent the majority of his childhood near San Antonio, Texas.

In 1976, Frese met Penelope (Penny) Anne Schnitter, a fellow graduate student at Ohio University in Athens, Ohio. During the early part of their friendship, Frese did not reveal his status as a person with schizophrenia, nor did Penny mention her status as a Franciscan nun. Once their relationship progressed, both revealed their unique backgrounds. The two were married in 1977 and raised four children. Fred credited his success to his stable, loving relationship with Penny.
