= Kendra's Law =

1999 New York law about psychiatric treatment

Kendra's Law, effective since November 1999, is a New York State law concerning involuntary outpatient commitment, also known as assisted outpatient treatment. It grants judges the authority to issue orders that require people who meet certain criteria to regularly undergo psychiatric treatment. Failure to comply can result in inpatient commitment for up to 72 hours. Kendra's Law does not mandate that patients be forced to take medication.

It was originally proposed by members of the National Alliance on Mental Illness, the Alliance on Mental Illness of New York State, and many local NAMI chapters throughout the state. They were concerned that laws were preventing individuals with serious mental illness from receiving care until after they became "dangerous to self or others". They viewed outpatient commitment as a less expensive, less restrictive and more humane alternative to inpatient commitment.

The members of NAMI, working with NYS Assemblywoman Elizabeth Connelly, NYC Department of Mental Health Commissioner Luis Marcos, and Howard Telson were successful in getting a three-year pilot commitment program started at Bellevue Hospital. When the Bellevue Outpatient Commitment Program came to an end, Attorney General Eliot Spitzer, the Treatment Advocacy Center and mental health advocate DJ Jaffe put together a coalition to pass a statewide law. It was based on the same concept as the Bellevue Outpatient Commitment Program but with important differences.

== Background ==
In 1999, there were a series of incidents involving individuals with untreated mental illness becoming violent. In one assault in the New York City Subway, Andrew Goldstein, 29 and diagnosed with schizophrenia but off medication, pushed Kendra Webdale into the path of an oncoming N train at the 23rd Street station. Goldstein had recently attempted to get treatment but had been turned away. Webdale's family joined a coalition led by Governor Pataki, the Treatment Advocacy Center and Jaffe, and the family played a significant role in getting the law passed. Subsequently, in a similar incident, Julio Perez, age 43, pushed Edgar Rivera in front of an uptown 6 train at 51st Street. Rivera lost his legs and became a strong supporter of the law. Kendra's Law, introduced by Pataki, was created as a response to these incidents. In 2005, the law was extended for five years.

As a result of these incidents, involuntary outpatient commitment moved from being seen as a program to help people with mental illness to a program that could increase public safety. Public safety advocates joined in trying to take the Bellevue Pilot Program statewide. What was formerly known as involuntary outpatient commitment was renamed euphemistically as "assisted outpatient treatment", in an attempt to imply a positive intent of the law.

== Criteria ==
Kendra's Law allows courts to order certain people diagnosed with mental illness to attend treatment as a condition for living in the community. The law is aimed at those who have a pattern of not following treatment recommendations which has resulted in hospitalization, or violent behaviors placing the patient or others as serious risk of physical harm.

In order to be subjected to Kendra's Law, individuals must meet the following criteria established in Section 9.60 of NYS Mental Health Law. A patient may be ordered to obtain assisted outpatient treatment if the court finds by clear and convincing evidence that:

- the patient is eighteen years of age or older; and
- the patient is suffering from a mental illness; and
- the patient is unlikely to survive safely in the community without supervision, based on a clinical determination; and
- the patient has a history of lack of compliance with treatment for mental illness that has:
  - at least twice within the last thirty-six months been a significant factor in necessitating hospitalization in a hospital, or receipt of services in a forensic or other mental health unit of a correctional facility or a local correctional facility, not including any period during which the person was hospitalized or incarcerated immediately preceding the filing of the petition or;
  - resulted in one or more acts of serious violent behavior toward self or others or threats of, or attempts at, serious physical harm to self or others within the last forty-eight months, not including any period in which the person was hospitalized or incarcerated immediately preceding the filing of the petition; and
- the patient is, as a result of his or her mental illness, unlikely to voluntarily participate in the recommended treatment pursuant to the treatment plan; and
- in view of the patient's treatment history and current behavior, the patient is in need of assisted outpatient treatment in order to prevent a relapse or deterioration which would be likely to result in serious harm to the patient or others as defined in section 9.01 of this article; and
- it is likely that the patient will benefit from assisted outpatient treatment; and
- if the patient has executed a health care proxy as defined in article 29-C of the public health law, that any directions included in such proxy shall be taken into account by the court in determining the written treatment plan; and
- the treatment plan set forth is the least restrictive plan that is most likely to benefit the patient.

A patient can only be ordered to assisted outpatient treatment for a maximum 12-month period. The assisted outpatient treatment may be renewed by petition filed prior to the current order's expiration. Where the petition is for a renewal, the 36-month limit for hospitalizations and the 48-month limit for violent behavior do not apply.

== Support ==
The New York Times reported that "a study has found that a controversial program that orders these patients to receive treatment when they are not hospitalized has had positive results. Patients were much less likely to end up back in psychiatric hospitals and were arrested less often. Use of outpatient treatment significantly increased, as did refills of medication. Costs to the mental health system and Medicaid of caring for these patients dropped by half or more."

According to the Treatment Advocacy Center, the following organizations (in part or in full) support the law:

=== National ===
- Treatment Advocacy Center (TAC)
- American Psychiatric Nurses Association
- American Psychiatric Association
- National Alliance on Mental Illness (NAMI)
- National Sheriffs' Association
- National Crime Prevention Council

=== Statewide ===
- National Alliance on Mental Illness New York State (NAMI NYS)
- NYS Association of Chiefs of Police (NYSCOP)

=== Regional and local ===
- AMI-Friends of NYS Psychiatric Institute, NYC
- NAMI/Familya of Rockland County
- NAMI Schenectady
- NAMI Chautauqua County
- NAMI of Buffalo and Erie County
- NAMI of NYC/Staten Island
- NAMI Orange County
- NAMI Champlain Valley
- Harlem Alliance for the Mentally Ill
- NAMI of Montgomery, Fulton, Hamilton Counties
- NAMI/Albany Relatives
- NAMI North Country
- Albany County Forensic Task Force
- Westchester County Chiefs of Police Association
- Orange County Police Chiefs Association
- Town of New Windsor, police department
- Town of Chester, NY Police Department
- Town of Mechanicville, police department
- West Seneca, NY Police Department
- Broome County District Attorney

=== Selected individual supporters ===
- Xavier Amador – author, I am Not Sick, I Don't Need Help!
- Pete Early – author, Crazy: A Father's Search Through America's Mental Health Madness
- Rael Jean Isaac – co-author, Madness in the Streets
- Richard Lamb – Dept. of Psychiatry, USC
- Edgar Rivera – lost legs in subway pushing
- E. Fuller Torrey – author, Surviving Schizophrenia
- Pat Webdale – mother of Kendra Webdale
- Robert Yolken – Director of Developmental Neurovirology Johns Hopkins Univ.
- DJ Jaffe, Executive Dir. Mental Illness Policy Org.

=== Media editorial supporters ===
- New York Times
- Newsday
- New York Post
- Daily News
- Albany Times Union
- Buffalo News
- Troy News
- Office of the Attorney General
- NYS Public Employees Federation
- Greater NY Hospital Association
- Citizens Crime Commission
- Victim Services Agency
- Visiting Nurses Service
- Justice for All
- St. Francis Residence

Moreover, research specifically on Kendra's Law in New York State shows lower rates of violence, homelessness, arrest, incarceration, and cost. It shows that those who support Kendra's Law say it helps them get well and stay well. Research in other states that have assisted outpatient treatment programs has also shown positive results.

Courts have ruled that Kendra's Law does not violate rights, citing the narrow criteria, the fact that the law does not provide for medication over objection ("force") and the government interest in reducing violence.

Supporters note that the system in the United States is so different from that in the U.K. that studies that aggregate community treatment orders (CTOs) used in the U.K. and elsewhere overseas with Kendra's Law as practiced in the U.S. do not give as accurate a picture as studies exclusively on Kendra's Law. They note that the Cochrane Study quoted by opponents of assisted outpatient treatment did not include any of the studies on Kendra's Law, or assisted outpatient treatment as practiced in other states, and only included a pilot program, the Bellevue Outpatient Commitment Program, that was never taken statewide.

In addition, the New York Times reported on Kendra's Law: the "program that orders these patients to receive treatment when they are not hospitalized has had positive results. Patients were much less likely to end up back in psychiatric hospitals and were arrested less often. Use of outpatient treatment significantly increased, as did refills of medication. Costs to the mental health system and Medicaid of caring for these patients dropped by half or more."

== Opposition ==
Kendra's Law is opposed for different reasons by many groups, most notably the anti-psychiatry movement and the New York Civil Liberties Union. Opponents say that the law has harmed the mental health system, because it can deter people from seeking treatment. The implementation of the law is also criticized as being racially and socioeconomically biased.

== Studies ==
A 2017 Cochrane systematic review of the literature, that included three relatively small randomized controlled trials, did not find significant differences in the use of services, social functioning, or quality of life when comparing compulsory community treatment with standard voluntary care or brief supervised discharge. The systematic review did report that people who receive compulsory community treatment may be less likely to be victims of crime, both violent and non-violent.

A randomized, controlled trial published in the Lancet concluded, "the imposition of compulsory supervision does not reduce the rate of readmission of psychotic patients. We found no support in terms of any reduction in overall hospital admission to justify the significant curtailment of patients' personal liberty."

Of 442 patients assessed, 336 patients were randomly assigned to be discharged from hospital either on CTO (167 patients) or Section 17 leave (169 patients). One patient withdrew directly after randomisation and two were ineligible, giving a total sample of 333 patients (166 in the CTO group and 167 in the Section 17 group). At 12 months, despite the fact that the length of initial compulsory outpatient treatment differed significantly between the two groups (median 183 days CTO group vs 8 days Section 17 group, p<0·001) the number of patients readmitted did not differ between groups (59 [36%] of 166 patients in the CTO group vs 60 [36%] of 167 patients in the Section 17 group; adjusted relative risk 1·0 [95% CI 0·75—1·33]).

A 2005 study, "Kendra's Law: A Final Report on the Status of Assisted Outpatient Treatment", done by New York State's Office of Mental Health, concluded, "Over a three year period prior to their AOT order, almost all (97%) had been hospitalized (with an average of three hospitalizations per recipient), and many experienced homelessness, arrest, and incarceration. During participation in the AOT program, rates for hospitalizations, homelessness, arrests, and incarcerations have declined significantly, and program participants have experienced a lessening of the stress associated with these events."

The same study found that 55% fewer recipients engaged in suicide attempts or physical harm to self; 47% fewer physically harmed others; 46% fewer damaged or destroyed property; 43% fewer threatened physical harm to others and the average decrease in harmful behaviors was 44%. 74% fewer participants experienced homelessness; 77% fewer experienced psychiatric hospitalization; there was a 56% reduction in length of hospitalization; 83% fewer experienced arrest; 87% fewer experienced incarceration; 49% fewer abused alcohol and 48% fewer abused drugs. The number of individuals exhibiting good adherence to medications increased 51%; The number of individuals exhibiting good service engagement increased 103%.

The study found that of those subjects included in the sample, 75% reported that AOT helped them gain control over their lives; 81% said AOT helped them get and stay well; 90% said AOT made them more likely to keep appointments and take medications; 87% of participants said they were confident in their case manager's ability, and 88% said they and their case manager agreed on the issues to be addressed.

The study reported the following effects on the mental health system. "Improved access to services. AOT has been instrumental in increasing accountability at all system levels regarding delivery of services to high need individuals. Community awareness of AOT has resulted in increased outreach to individuals who had previously presented engagement challenges to mental health service providers." "Improved treatment plan development, discharge planning, and coordination of service planning. Processes and structures developed for AOT have resulted in improvements to treatment plans that more appropriately match the needs of individuals who have had difficulties using mental health services in the past." "Improved collaboration between mental health and court systems. As AOT processes have matured, professionals from the two systems have improved their working relationships, resulting in greater efficiencies, and ultimately, the conservation of judicial, clinical, and administrative resources." "There is now an organized process to prioritize and monitor individuals with the greatest need ..." AOT ensures greater access to services for individuals whom providers have previously been reluctant to serve. ..." "There is now increased collaboration between inpatient and community-based providers."

A 2009 study, New York State Assisted Outpatient Treatment Evaluation done by Duke University, Policy Research Associates, University of Virginia, concluded that New York State's program had the following effects on the mental health system:

improves a range of important outcomes for its recipients, apparently without feared negative consequences to recipients. The increased services available under AOT clearly improve recipient outcomes, however, the AOT court order, itself, and its monitoring do appear to offer additional benefits in improving outcomes. It is also important to recognize that the AOT order exerts a critical effect on service providers stimulating their efforts to prioritize care for AOT recipients.

The authors said that the evaluation reflected not just the compulsory aspects of the program, but the additional resources provided for recipients, particularly in New York City.

The same study found "No evidence that the AOT Program is disproportionately selecting African Americans for court orders, nor is there evidence of a disproportionate effect on other minority populations. Our interviews with key stakeholders across the state corroborate these findings." "AOT order exerts a critical effect on service providers stimulating their efforts to prioritize care for AOT recipients." "After 12 months or more on AOT, service engagement increased such that AOT recipients were judged to be more engaged than voluntary patients. This suggests that after 12 months or more, when combined with intensive services, AOT increases service engagement compared to voluntary treatment alone." "Despite being under a court order to participate in treatment, current AOT recipients feel neither more positive nor more negative about their treatment experiences than comparable individuals who are not under AOT."

One study found that Kendra's Law has lowered the risk of violent behaviors, reduced thoughts about suicide, and enhanced capacity to function despite problems with mental illness. Patients given mandatory outpatient treatment were four times less likely than members of the control group to perpetrate serious violence after undergoing treatment. Patients who underwent mandatory treatment reported higher social functioning and slightly less stigma, rebutting claims that mandatory outpatient care is a threat to self-esteem.

Another study found, "For those who received AOT, the odds of any arrest were 2.66 times greater (p<.01) and the odds of arrest for a violent offense 8.61 times greater (p<.05) before AOT than they were in the period during and shortly after AOT. The group never receiving AOT had nearly double the odds (1.91, p<.05) of arrest compared with the AOT group in the period during and shortly after assignment."

Another study found, "The odds of arrest for participants currently receiving AOT were nearly two-thirds lower (OR=.39, p<.01) than for individuals who had not yet initiated AOT or signed a voluntary service agreement."

A study previously cited also found, "The likelihood of psychiatric hospital admission was significantly reduced by approximately 25% during the initial six-month court order ... and by over one-third during a subsequent six-month renewal of the order.... Similar significant reductions in days of hospitalization were evident during initial court orders and subsequent renewals.... Improvements were also evident in receipt of psychotropic medications and intensive case management services. Analysis of data from case manager reports showed similar reductions in hospital admissions and improved engagement in services."

A peer-reviewed study that included an analysis on the costs of assisted outpatient treatment found that in New York City net costs declined 50 percent in the first year after AOT began and an additional 13 percent in the second year. In non-NYC counties, costs declined 62 percent in the first year and an additional 27 percent in the second year. This was in spite of the fact that psychotropic drug costs increased during the first year after initiation of AOT, by 40 percent and 44 percent in the city and five-county samples, respectively. The increased community-based mental health costs were more than offset by the reduction in inpatient and incarceration costs. Cost declines associated with AOT were about twice as large as those seen for voluntary services.

Another study found that "In all three regions, for all three groups, the predicted probability of a M(edication) P(ossession) R(atio) ≥80% improved over time (AOT improved by 31–40 percentage points, followed by enhanced services, which improved by 15–22 points, and 'neither treatment,' improving 8–19 points)."

Another peer review study on the effect of AOT on the mental health system found that "In tandem with New York's AOT program, enhanced services increased among involuntary recipients, whereas no corresponding increase was initially seen for voluntary recipients. In the long run, however, overall service capacity was increased, and the focus on enhanced services for AOT participants appears to have led to greater access to enhanced services for both voluntary and involuntary recipients."

Finally, a study found individuals in AOT stay in treatment after AOT ends. "When the court order was for seven months or more, improved medication possession rates and reduced hospitalization outcomes were sustained even when the former AOT recipients were no longer receiving intensive case coordination services."

=== Current status ===
On January 15, 2013, New York Governor Andrew Cuomo signed into law a new measure that extended Kendra's Law through 2017.

Forty-seven states have adopted laws allowing for AOT.

In February 2021, Governor Cuomo suggested that state lawmakers should revisit or expand Kendra's law, after New York City experienced a spate of violent attacks committed by people with untreated mental illness.
