= Steven Sharfstein =

American psychiatrist

Steven Samuel Sharfstein (born July 2, 1942) is an American psychiatrist. He was secretary of the American Psychiatric Association from 1991 to 1995, its vice president from 2002 to 2004, and president from 2005 to 2006. Sharfstein also received the Human Rights Award from the American Psychiatric Association in 2007.

== Life and career ==
Sharfstein was born in New York City and earned his bachelor's degree from Dartmouth College in 1964. He graduated from Albert Einstein College of Medicine in 1968 and did his psychiatric residency at Massachusetts Mental Health Center from 1969 to 1973. During that time he earned his M.P.A. from the John F. Kennedy School of Government. He later attended the six-week advanced management program at Harvard Business School. He has been president and chief executive officer of Sheppard Pratt Health System since 1992.

He has been a lecturer in psychiatry at Johns Hopkins University and has served as vice chair and clinical professor of psychiatry at University of Maryland. He held a variety of positions at the National Institute of Mental Health, including director of mental health service programs, as well as positions in consultation/liaison psychiatry and research in behavioral medicine.

Sharfstein has been involved in several prominent issues facing psychiatry, including the medical ethics of psychiatrists assisting with detention and interrogation of terrorism suspects at facilities like the Guantanamo Bay detention camp. He has spoken at length about the biopsychiatry controversy in his field. He has also expressed concern about conflict of interest that can occur between psychiatrists and drug companies.

In 2015 Sharfstein announced that he would retire from Sheppard Pratt in July 2016.

== Personal life ==
His son Joshua Sharfstein, also a physician, was appointed by Barack Obama as Principal Deputy Commissioner of the FDA in 2009.
