= Atascadero State Hospital =

Coordinates: 35°27′49″N 120°38′06″W

- California Department of State Hospitals

Geography
- Location: Atascadero, California, United States

Organization
- Care system: Psychiatric ward
- Type: Forensic psychiatry

Services
- Emergency department: Department of State Hospitals - Atascadero Police Department (DSHAPD, ASHPD, or DPS)
- Beds: 1239

History
- Founded: 1954

Links
- Website: Official website
- Lists: Hospitals in California

Atascadero State Hospital, formally known as California Department of State Hospitals - Atascadero (DSHA), is an all-male maximum-security forensic institution that houses mentally ill convicts who have been committed to psychiatric facilities by California's courts, located on the Central Coast of California, in San Luis Obispo County, halfway between Los Angeles and San Francisco. Located on a 700+ acre grounds in the city of Atascadero, California, it is the largest employer in that town. DSHA is not a general purpose public hospital, and the only patients admitted are those that are referred to the hospital by the Superior Court, Board of Prison Terms, or the Department of Corrections.

== History ==
Atascadero State Hospital (ASH) opened in 1954, as a state-run, self-contained public sector forensic psychiatric facility. It is enclosed within a security perimeter, and accredited by the Joint Commission on Accreditation of Healthcare Organizations (JCAHO). Patients are referred to the hospital by the Superior Court, Board of Prison Terms, or the California Department of Corrections.

According to a 1978 federal study of sex offender treatment program, "an informal history of [ASH], distributed in 1975, reports that Atascadero opened “with the philosophy that good therapy could be carried on in a security setting and that modern methods of psychiatric treatment, based on a therapeutic community' concept, would most likely succeed.“ The problems of 'therapy vs. security' and 'prison vs. hospital' immediately developed and hindered successful treatment. The belief that criminals should be punished for their crime and not 'babied' haunted the hospital program. For several years beginning in 1959, a series of unfortunate and tragic accidents occurred at the hospital. A number of escapes and violent incidents in addition to widespread community concern led to a special investigation of the hospital's problems which ultimately resulted in a revamping of its organization, administration, and treatment programs” beginning in 1961. The 1960's were also a troubled decade for Atascadero, plagued by internal dissension, staff rebellions, and occasional scandal."

As early as the 1970s, ASH was referred to as a "Dachau for Queers." The term appeared in a March 1972 L.A. Free Press article, with an editor's note stating: "The following story is an edited version of Don Jackson’s article "Dachau For Queers" which originally appeared in The Gay Liberation Book by Ramparts Press." A 2009 California Law Review article commented: "One reason for this appellation was that inmates [sic] were subjected to experimental therapies - electrical and pharmacological shock treatments in addition to lobotomies - to "cure" them of their "sex perversion."" Recent appearances of this term include a 2011 PBS American Experiences documentary "Stonewall Uprising", which was rebroadcast in 2020, and a 2012 New Yorker article. In 1976, Michael Serber MD (then ASH Clinical Director) coauthored a paper commenting: "The history of treatment for the homosexual at this institution has mainly centered around inadequate and sometimes cruel attempts at conversion to heterosexuality or asexuality. There is an intermittent history of aversive conditioning. These aversive techniques had extended even to the use of succinylcholine and electroconvulsive shock treatment as punishment for homosexual offenders who had 'deviated' within the hospital. At the very minimum, homosexuals were frequently degraded by staff whose attitudes concerning homosexuality were punitive and judgmental. More homosexual patients than heterosexual had been defined as unamenable to treatment after a period of hospitalization and then were sent to prison via the courts under the ambiguous judicial system that determines the fate of sexual offenders in the state of California.” Through an NIMH "Hospital Improvement" grant (1971–75), Dr. Serber and his coauthor Claudia Keith MA led improvements in ASH's programs.

ASH's treatment programs have reflected the psychiatric assumptions of the times. Initially constructed to treat mentally disordered sex offenders (MDSOs), initial programs focused on separation from society, albeit in an environment which provided freedom of movement. This was restricted after patient escapes. Initial research and treatment programs aimed at understanding and reducing the risk of reoffense in sexual offenders. In the early 1980s, the focus of the hospital's treatment programs shifted to patients found not guilty by reason of insanity (NGRI) and incompetent to stand trial; ASH was a pioneer in developing effective treatment programs for the latter. In the 1990s, California passed sexually violent predator (SVP) laws, imposing civil commitment upon prisoners meeting criteria upon the expiration of their determinate prison term. SVPs were housed in ASH until the new state hospital in Coalinga opened around 2004.

In the mid-1980s, a US Department of Justice investigation under the Civil Rights of Institutionalized Persons Act (CRIPA) led to important and positive clinical reforms at ASH. Sidney F. Herndon was the Executive Director throughout the 1980s and brought in a strong clinical and administrative team and built up the medical staff under Gordon Gritter MD as Clinical Director. David Saunders MD led the development of a forensic psychiatry fellowship, affiliated with UCSF-Fresno and UCLA. Harold Carmel MD and Mel Hunter JD MPA established the Atascadero Clinical Safety Project (ACSP) which conducted groundbreaking research into staff injuries from patient aggression. After Carmel left to become CEO of the Colorado Mental Health Institute at Pueblo in 1991, Hunter and Colleen Love developed important programs to improve staff safety, which won awards from the American Psychiatric Association. and, in 1998, JCAHO's Ernest A. Codman Award in the Hospital Category. In this era, ASH was an important center of research and teaching.

Many clinical staff left ASH in the late 1990s with the advent of the SVPs, which was believed by many clinicians to compromise the hospital's mission of providing excellent care for persons with serious mental illness, as opposed to containment of sexually dangerous offenders.

When salaries for California prison mental health staff, especially psychiatrists, increased dramatically as a result of federal litigation, ASH lost many of its psychiatrists and other clinical staff. Psychiatrist salaries have been increased to levels just under the prison psychiatrist salaries, and ASH's psychiatrist staffing is now (2014) being rebuilt.

Another traumatic period came with another US DOJ CRIPA investigation in the mid-2000s. In 2007, Mel Hunter, by this time ASH Executive Director, was removed from his position as a result of his refusal to alter the clinical operations of the hospital at the behest of the DOJ consultants. He was replaced by new hospital leadership. In the event, the imposition of the atypical views of consultants with no experience in forensic psychiatry led to a degradation of clinical operations and safety, with great spikes in patient violence that came to an end when the consultants left the hospital following exposés by the LA Times into apparent cronyism.

A 2018 law review article reported that in 2004, then-CEO Mel Hunter had supported research showing that SVP reoffense was much lower than claimed: "This Article uses internal memoranda and emails to describe the efforts of the California Department of Mental Health to suppress a serious and well-designed study that showed just 6.5% of untreated sexually violent predators were arrested for a new sex crime within 4.8 years of release from a locked mental facility. ... these results undermine the justification for indeterminate lifetime commitment of sex offenders." Three days after Hunter's removal in 2007, his successor issued a memo terminating the study and prohibiting the use of "the previously gathered data for publication, research, testimony, or any other purpose." This suggests a second reason for Hunter's exit and is a coda to ASH's history as a research center.

=== Patient-on-patient homicides ===
On April 16, 1990, a 59 year old property clerk, George Bergstresser of Atascadero formally of Allentown of the state hospital was fatally attacked by a patient named Terry Caylor.

On March 30, 2008, 44-year-old inmate Earl McKee strangled a fellow inmate, 37-year-old Lawrence Rael, to death with a knotted towel. McKee was originally institutionalized as a "Mentally Disordered Offender". In 2007, after making abusive threats to other inmates, he was reclassified as a "Sexually Violent Predator". The murder came in the wake of federal court-mandated changes that reduced the usage of medication and restraints on patients, as well as a large turnover in staffing resulting in less experienced personnel working at the hospital.

On May 28, 2014, a patient was killed and an employee was severely injured during an alleged attack by a patient.

== Drastic changes since appointment of court monitors ==
In recent years, the hospital, under the threat of a lawsuit by the United States Justice Department alleging violations of the Civil Rights of Institutionalized Persons Act, has been implementing a court-approved Enhancement Plan to bring the hospital into compliance with CRIPA. The Enhancement Plan was proposed and implemented by the "Human Potential Consulting Group" out of Alexandria, Virginia. This consulting group consists of various clinical professionals who have been contracted by other states to ensure compliance with CRIPA. In some states the consultants serve as court monitors while others serve as consultants. They regularly switch roles from Justice Department monitors to consultants, depending on the state.

== Notable patients ==
- Edward Charles Allaway - Mass murderer
- Arthur Leigh Allen - Zodiac Killer suspect
- William Bonin - Serial killer
- Bunny Breckinridge - Actor convicted of "sex perversion" involving minors
- Joseph Danks - Spree killer
- James Hydrick - Sex offender
- David Misch - Serial killer
- John David Norman - Sex offender
- Edmund Kemper - Serial killer
- Roy Norris - One of the two "Toolbox Killers"
- Scott Harlan Thorpe - Spree killer
- Erwin Walker - WW2 veteran convicted of several crimes, including murder
- Charles "Tex" Watson - Serial killer; member of the Manson family
- Earl Van Best Jr. - Sex offender, Zodiac Killer suspect

== Employees ==
Approximately 2,140 employees work at DSH-Atascadero providing round-the-clock care, including psychologists, psychiatrists, social workers, rehabilitation therapists, psychiatric technicians, registered nurses, and other clinical and administrative staff. There are approximately 173 different job classifications at the facility, including hospital police, kitchen staff, custodial staff, warehouse workers, groundskeepers, information technology staff, plant operations staff, spiritual leaders, and other clinical and administrative staff. DSHA provides on-site training programs for a variety of schools, including nurse practitioner programs, psychiatric technician training, clinical psychology and dietetic internship programs. DSH-Atascadero is also the regional training center for hospital police officers throughout the State of California.

== Police Department ==
Atascadero State Hospital has its own full service law enforcement agency of over 200 sworn personnel. Police Officers are sworn law enforcement officers whose authority is granted under California Penal Code Section 830. DSH police officers are not affiliated with California Department of Corrections and Rehabilitation (CDCR). The police officers of the Department of State Hospitals are peace officers whose authority extends to any place in the state for the purpose of performing their primary duty or when making an arrest pursuant to Section 836 as to any public offense with respect to which there is immediate danger to person or property, or of the escape of the perpetrator of that offense, or pursuant to Section 8597 or 8598 of the Government Code provided that the primary duty of the peace officers shall be the enforcement of the law as set forth in Sections 4311, 4313, 4491, and 4493 of the Welfare and Institutions Code. DSH police officers are granted authority by the California Welfare and Institutions Code to enforce policies and directives set forth by the administration of Department of State Hospitals.

DSH police officers enforce the California Penal Code, as well as the California Vehicle Code, and are granted authority by the State of California to make arrests and issue citations. It is the primary function of the Department of State Hospitals' police officers to provide safety, service, and security to patients, employees and the public in and around each hospital. However, this police department does assist neighboring law enforcement agencies with police activities and functions, off-site of the grounds of DSHA. In addition to police responsibilities and investigations, police officers work closely with clinical staff to ensure the safe treatment of the patients of DSHA.

== Popular culture ==
One of radio host Phil Hendrie's recurring fictional characters is Herb Sewell, a former sex offender who was remanded for eight years at Atascadero State Hospital.
