= Lokai (company) =

American jewelry brand

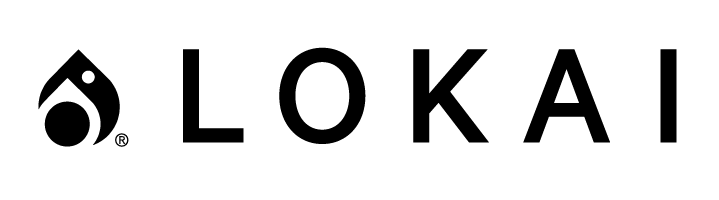
- Type: Private
- Industry: Jewelry & Lifestyle Goods
- Founded: 2013
- Founder: Steven Izen
- Headquarters: New York, NY
- Products: Bracelets
- Website: lokai.com

Lokai is a New York-based jewelry brand that markets itself as a "socially responsible lifestyle brand." The company is best known for its bracelets that include materials sourced from natural landmarks such as Mount Everest and the Dead Sea. The company donates 10% of net profits to charitable organizations.

== Background ==
The brand launched in 2013 after Founder & CEO Steven Izen was on vacation with his family and received news that his grandfather had been diagnosed with Alzheimer's.

The name "Lokai" was inspired by the Hawaiian word "Lōkahi," meaning the blending of opposites.

Lokai.com officially launched in June 2013 with the Classic Lokai and has since grown to include several different product collections, which are meant serve as a reminder of balance.

== Awards and recognition ==
The brand was a 2017 New York Winner of Smart CEO's Future 50 Awards.

CEO Steven Izen was a finalist in the 2016 Ernst & Young Entrepreneur of the Year Awards, was named in the 2017 Forbes 30 under 30 list and is a member of the Make-A-Wish National Board of Directors.

== Charity partnerships ==
The brand has partnered with a wide variety of charities to produce a collection of different colored bracelets. $1 per bracelet sold is donated back to the charity in question. Since 2013, Lokai has donated over 8 million dollars to charitable organizations.

== List of charity partners ==
- Charity Water
- WWF
- Susan G. Komen
- Save The Children
- Alzheimer's Association
- Make-A-Wish
- Oceana
- BCRF
- (RED)
- NAMI
- The Nature Conservancy
- International Rescue Committee
- National Pediatric Cancer Foundation
- Autism Speaks
- Ditch The Label
- It Gets Better Project
- Humane Society of the United States
- Wings For Life
- Can Do MS

== Licenses ==
The company sells officially licensed products of Major League Baseball, Major League Soccer, the National Hockey League, the National Football League, Star Wars, and over 100 colleges and universities.

== Criticism ==
It has been questioned whether or not the beads actually contain water from Mount Everest or mud from the Dead Sea. In response to such criticism, wearers resorted to cutting apart their bracelets to see if there is actually anything inside, and some claim to have found just empty beads.

== Brand evolution ==
In May 2019, the company launched Elements, wellness drinks made from adaptogens.
