= Outpatient commitment =

Legal power to control behavior of mental health patients while in the community

Outpatient commitment—also called assisted outpatient treatment (AOT) or community treatment orders (CTO)—refers to a civil court procedure wherein a legal process orders an individual diagnosed with a severe mental disorder to adhere to an outpatient treatment plan designed to prevent further deterioration or recurrence that is harmful to themselves or others.

This form of involuntary treatment is distinct from involuntary commitment in that the individual subject to the order continues to live in their home community rather than being detained in hospital or incarcerated. The individual may be subject to rapid recall to hospital, including medication over objections, if the conditions of the order are broken, and the person's mental health deteriorates. This generally means taking psychiatric medication as directed and may also include attending appointments with a mental health professional, and sometimes even not to take non-prescribed illicit drugs and not associate with certain people or in certain places deemed to have been linked to a deterioration in mental health in that individual.

The criteria and process for outpatient commitment are established by law, which vary among nations and, in the U.S. and Canada, among states or provinces. Some jurisdictions require court hearings, where a judge will make a court order, and others require that treating psychiatrists comply with a set of requirements before compulsory treatment is instituted. When a court process is not required, there is usually a form of appeal to the courts or appeal to or scrutiny by tribunals set up for that purpose. Community treatment laws have generally followed the worldwide trend of community treatment. See mental health law for details of countries which do not have laws that regulate compulsory treatment.

== Terminology ==
In the United States the term "assisted outpatient treatment" (AOT) is often used and refers to a process whereby a judge orders a qualifying person with symptoms of severe untreated mental illness to adhere to a mental health treatment plan while living in the community. The plan typically includes medication and may include other forms of treatment as well. Patients are often monitored and assigned to case managers or a community dedicated to treating mental health known as assertive community treatment (ACT).

Australia, Canada, England, and New Zealand use the term "community treatment order" (CTO).

== Comparison to inpatient commitment ==
The terminology, "outpatient commitment", and legal construction often equate outpatient commitment with inpatient commitment but providing the patient more freedom. (Note: When introducing the bill introducing CTO in the UK Lord Warner, then Minister of NHS reform, said "That modern approach strikes a balance between individual autonomy and protection of the patient and the public." "CTOs were first conceived as a less restrictive alternative to involuntary hospital admission. They allowed patients detainable under mental health legislation to be treated outside hospital and had the same stringent criteria as involuntary admissions. From the perspective of clinicians, patients and their families, as well as human rights lawyers, 'least restrictive' CTOs were considered preferable to hospital detention.") In practice, outpatient commitment may be used in situations where commitment would not be used because it is cheaper than inpatient commitment; (Note: "it has been argued that economic and financial imperatives, as much asideologies of good practice9 have driven this policy") seen as less draconian; and protects mental health professionals from moral, civil or criminal liability.

== Preventive use ==
Outpatient commitment is used in some countries to prevent relapse of mental disorders, as many mental disorders are episodic in nature (for example bipolar disorder or schizophrenia) and it can be difficult to predict whether a mental disorder will reoccur. Some countries use outpatient commitment for first episode psychosis (FEP).

== Implementation ==
Discussions of "outpatient commitment" began in the psychiatry community in the 1980s following deinstitutionalization, a trend that led to the widespread closure of public psychiatric hospitals and resulted in the discharge of large numbers of people with mental illness to the community.

=== Europe ===
==== Denmark ====
Denmark introduced outpatient commitment in 2010 with the Mental Health Act (Danish: Lov om anvendelse af tvang i psykiatrien).

==== Germany ====
In Germany, CTOs were resumed in 2015 (formerly only for forensic psychiatry). Laws regarding implementations are distincts between lander.

==== France ====
The CTOs are renewed every month. They were introduced under Nicolas Sarkozy presidency. Persons committed are registered on a national file accessible by police, even if they are not suspected of breaking the law.

==== The Netherlands ====
As of 2014, Dutch law provides for community treatment orders, and an individual who does not comply with the terms of their CTO may be subject to immediate involuntary commitment.

==== Norway ====
When Norway introduced outpatient commitment in the 1961 Mental Health Act, it could only be mandated for individuals who had previously been admitted for inpatient treatment. Revisions in 1999 and 2006 provided for outpatient commitment without previous inpatient treatment, but this provision is seldom used.

==== Sweden ====
In Sweden, the Compulsory Psychiatric Care Act (Swedish: Lag om psykiatrisk tvångsvård) provides for an administrative court to mandate psychiatric treatment to prevent harm to the individual or others. The law was created in 1991 and revised in 2008.

==== England and Wales ====
Changes in service provision and amendments to the Mental Health Act in England and Wales have increased the scope for compulsion in the community. The Mental Health Act 2007 introduced community treatment orders (CTOs). CTOs are legally defined as a form of outpatient leave for individuals detained under section 3 of the Mental Health Act. As such, only members of the medical community are involved in issuing a CTO, though both the section 3 detention underlying the CTO and the CTO itself can be appealed to the Mental Health Tribunal where a panel consisting of medical doctors and a judge will make a decision.The legislation in the UK specifically allows CTOs to be issued after a single admission to hospital for treatment. However, the Royal College of Psychiatrists suggested limiting CTOs to patients with a history of noncompliance and hospitalization, when it reviewed the current mental health legislation. (Note: "The remit of CTOs should be limited to ensure they are only used when most beneficial. The Review should consider amending the criteria to reflect a history of non-compliance with treatment leading to subsequent compulsory admission(s) within a defined timeframe.")

John Mayer Chamberlain argues that this legislation was triggered by the Killing of Jonathan Zito by an individual who had interactions with mental health services prior this event, which led the then conservative government to argue for CTOs.

A review of patient data in London found that the average duration of a CTO in the UK was 3 years. Black people in the UK are more than ten times as likely to be under a CTO as white people. Concerns have been raised about the inability of Independent mental health advocates (IHMAs) to provide services to those under CTOs, since IMHAs cannot make contact with service users under CTOs and case workers could act as gatekeepers not providing referrals.

In a 2021 paper reviewing the mental health act, the UK government proposed a new form of indefinite outpatient commitment allowing for deprivation of liberties an continuous supervision termed supervised discharge. This discharge would be reviewed yearly, and only apply to individuals who would not benefit from treatment in a hospital setting and would be based on risk. Further, this legislation would only apply to restricted patients who have been diverted to the mental health care system from courts.

==== Scotland ====
Scotland has a different community commitment regime from England and Wales introduced in the 2003 Mental Health Act. There is ongoing debate in the UK on the place of coercion and compulsion in community mental health care.

==== Luxembourg ====
Patients may be recalled if they don't abide to conditions on residence or medical supervision decided by a psychiatrist on discharge for 3 months after having been released from an involuntary commitment.

=== North America ===
In the last decade of the 20th century and the first of the 21st, "outpatient commitment" laws were passed in a number of U.S. states and jurisdictions in Canada.

==== Canada ====
CTO implementation in Canada (2013)

In the mid-1990s, Saskatchewan became the first Canadian province to implement community treatment orders, and Ontario followed in 2000. As of January 2016, New Brunswick was the only province without legislation that provided for either CTOs or extended leave.

==== United States ====
AOT implementation in the United States (2013)

By the end of 2010, 44 U.S. states had enacted some version of an outpatient commitment law. In some cases, passage of the laws followed widely publicized tragedies, such as the murders of Laura Wilcox and Kendra Webdale.

=== Oceania ===
Australia and New Zealand introduced community treatment orders in the 1980s and 1990s.

==== Australia ====
In the Australian state of Victoria, community treatment orders last for a maximum of six months but can be renewed after review by a tribunal.

== Controversy ==
Proponents have argued that outpatient commitment improves mental health, increases the effectiveness of treatment, lowers the incidence of homelessness, arrest, incarceration, and hospitalization, and reduces costs. Opponents of outpatient commitment laws argue that they unnecessarily limit freedom, force people to ingest dangerous medications, impede their human rights, or are applied with racial and socioeconomic biases.

=== Arguments for and proponents ===
While many outpatient commitment laws have been passed in response to violent acts committed by people with mental illness, most proponents involved in the outpatient commitment debate also make arguments based on the quality of life and cost associated with untreated mental illness and "revolving door patients" who experience a cycle of hospitalization, treatment and stabilization, release, and decompensation. While the cost of repeated hospitalizations is indisputable, quality-of-life arguments rest on an understanding of mental illness as an undesirable and dangerous state of being. Outpatient commitment proponents point to studies performed in North Carolina and New York that have found some positive impact of court-ordered outpatient treatment. Proponents include: Substance Abuse and Mental Health Services Administration (SAMHSA), U.S. Department of Justice, Agency for Healthcare Research and Quality (AHRQ), U. S Department of Health and Human Services, American Psychiatric Association, National Alliance on Mental Illness, International Association of Chiefs of Police. SAMHSA included Assisted Outpatient Treatment in their National Registry of Evidence Based Program and Practices. Crime Solutions: Management Strategies to Reduce Psychiatric Readmissions. The Treatment Advocacy Center are an advocacy group that campaign for the use of outpatient commitment.

A systematic review in 2016 looked at around 200 papers investigating the effectiveness of CTOs for patient outcomes. It found that non-randomized trials had dramatically varying results and that no randomized controlled trials showed any benefits to the patient for outpatient commitment apart from a reduction in the risk of being the victim of crime.

Due to legal, bureaucratic, and social factors, the same interventions can have different effects in different countries.

==== Cost ====
Research published in 2013 showed that Kendra's Law in New York, which served about 2,500 patients at a cost of $32 million, had positive results in terms of net cost and reduced arrests. About $125 million is also spent annually on improved outpatient treatment for patients who are not subject to the law. In contrast to New York, despite the wide adoption of outpatient commitment, the programs were generally not adequately funded.

"Although numerous AOT programs currently operate across the United States, it is clear that the intervention is vastly underutilized."

==== Arrests, danger, and violence ====
The National Institute of Justice considers assisted outpatient treatment an effective crime prevention program. Some studies in the US have found that AOT programs have reduced the chances of arrest. (Note: "For those who received AOT, the odds of any arrest were 2.66 times greater (p<.01) and the odds of arrest for a violent offense 8.61 times greater (p<.05) before AOT than they were in the period during and shortly after AOT. The group never receiving AOT had nearly double the odds (1.91, p<.05) of arrest compared with the AOT group in the period during and shortly after assignment." "The odds of arrest for participants currently receiving AOT were nearly two-thirds lower (OR=.39, p<.01) than for individuals who had not yet initiated AOT or signed a voluntary service agreement.") Kendra's Law has lowered the risk of violent behaviors and reduced thoughts about suicide. (Note: Patients given mandatory outpatient treatment—who were more violent to begin with—were nevertheless four times less likely than members of the control group to perpetrate serious violence after undergoing treatment. Patients who underwent mandatory treatment reported higher social functioning and slightly less stigma, rebutting claims that mandatory outpatient care is a threat to self-esteem. Participants in AOT showed significant reductions in harmful behaviors: 55% fewer engaged in suicide attempts; there was a 47% decrease in the frequency with which they harmed others, and a 46% reduction in their frequency of property damage to others. Overall, harmful behaviors decreased by 44%. "Subjects who were ordered to outpatient commitment were less likely to be criminally victimized than those who were released without outpatient commitment.")

==== Outcomes and hospital admissions ====
AOT "programs improve adherence with outpatient treatment and have been shown to lead to significantly fewer emergency commitments, hospital admissions, and hospital days as well as a reduction in arrests and violent behavior."

"The likelihood of psychiatric hospital admission was significantly reduced by approximately 25% during the initial six-month court order...and by over one-third during a subsequent six-month renewal of the order.... Similar significant reductions in days of hospitalization were evident during initial court orders and subsequent renewals.... Improvements were also evident in receipt of psychotropic medications and intensive case management services. Analysis of data from case manager reports showed similar reductions in hospital admissions and improved engagement in services."

A significant reduction in adverse outcomes was observed among participants, including a 74% decrease in experiences of homelessness and a 77% reduction in psychiatric hospitalizations. Moreover, the average length of hospitalization decreased by 56%, while arrests and incarcerations fell by 83% and 87%, respectively. Substance abuse also declined, with a 49% reduction in alcohol abuse and a 48% reduction in drug abuse.

Notably, consumer participation and medication compliance showed marked improvement, with a 51% increase in individuals demonstrating good adherence to medication regimens. Additionally, those exhibiting strong engagement with services rose by 103%. Consumer feedback was largely positive; 75% of participants indicated that AOT contributed to their ability to regain control over their lives, while 81% reported that AOT facilitated their recovery and well-being. Furthermore, 90% of participants expressed a higher likelihood of attending appointments and adhering to the medication prescribed. Confidence in case management was also reflected, with 87% of participants affirming their trust in their case manager's capabilities. Finally, 88% of participants indicated alignment between themselves and their case managers regarding prioritized areas for intervention.

In Nevada County, CA, AOT ("Laura's Law") decreased the number of psychiatric hospital days by 46.7%, incarceration days by 65.1%, homeless days by 61.9%, and emergency interventions by 44.1%. Laura's Law implementation saved $1.81–$2.52 for every dollar spent, and receiving services under Laura's Law caused a "reduction in actual hospital costs of $213,300" and a "reduction in actual incarceration costs of $75,600."

In New Jersey, Kim Veith, director of clinical services at Ocean Mental Health Services, noted the AOT pilot program performed "beyond wildest dreams." AOT reduced hospitalizations, shortened inpatient stays, reduced crime and incarceration, stabilized housing, and reduced homelessness. Of clients who were homeless, 20% are now in supportive housing, 40% are in boarding homes, and 20% are living successfully with family members.

Writing in the British Journal of Psychiatry in 2013, Jorun Rugkåsa and John Dawson stated, "The current evidence from RCTs suggests that CTOs do not reduce readmission rates over 12 months."

==== Effect on mental illness system ====
===== Access to services =====
"AOT has been instrumental in increasing accountability at all system levels regarding delivery of services to high need individuals. Community awareness of AOT has resulted in increased outreach to individuals who had previously presented engagement challenges to mental health service providers."

"Improved treatment plan development, discharge planning, and coordination of service planning. Processes and structures developed for AOT have resulted in improvements to treatment plans that more appropriately match the needs of individuals who have had difficulties using mental health services in the past."

"Improved collaboration between mental health and court systems. As AOT processes have matured, professionals from the two systems have improved their working relationships, resulting in greater efficiencies, and ultimately, the conservation of judicial, clinical, and administrative resources. There is now an organized process to prioritize and monitor individuals with the greatest need; AOT ensures greater access to services for individuals whom providers have previously been reluctant to serve; There is now increased collaboration between inpatient and community-based providers."

In New York City, net costs declined 50% in the first year after assisted outpatient treatment began and an additional 13% in the second year. In non-NYC counties, costs fell 62% in the first year and an extra 27% in the second year. This was even though psychotropic drug costs increased during the first year after initiation of assisted outpatient treatment, by 40% and 44% in the city and five-county samples, respectively. The increased community-based mental health costs were more than offset by the reduction in inpatient and incarceration costs. Cost declines associated with assisted outpatient treatment were about twice as large as those seen for voluntary services.

"In all three regions, for all three groups, the predicted probability of an MPR ≥80% improved over time (AOT improved by 31–40 percentage points, followed by enhanced services, which improved by 15–22 points, and 'neither treatment,' improving 8–19 points). Some regional differences in MPR trajectories were observed."

"In tandem with New York's AOT program, enhanced services increased among involuntary recipients, whereas no corresponding increase was initially seen for voluntary recipients. In the long run, however, overall service capacity was increased, and the focus on enhanced services for AOT participants appears to have led to greater access to enhanced services for both voluntary and involuntary recipients."

===== Race =====
"We find no evidence that the AOT Program is disproportionately selecting African Americans for court orders, nor is there evidence of a disproportionate effect on other minority populations. Our interviews with key stakeholders across the state corroborate these findings."

"We found no evidence of racial bias. Defining the target population as public-system clients with multiple hospitalizations, the rate of application to white and black clients approaches parity."

===== Service engagement =====
"After 12 months or more on AOT, service engagement increased such that AOT recipients were judged to be more engaged than voluntary patients. This suggests that after 12 months or more, when combined with intensive services, AOT increases service engagement compared to voluntary treatment alone."

Consumers approve. Despite being under a court order to participate in treatment, current AOT recipients feel neither more positive nor more negative about their treatment experiences than comparable individuals who are not under AOT."

"When the court order was for seven months or more, improved medication possession rates and reduced hospitalization outcomes were sustained even when the former AOT recipients were no longer receiving intensive case coordination services."

In Los Angeles, CA, the AOT pilot program reduced incarceration 78%, hospitalization 86%, hospitalization after discharge from the program by 77%, and cut taxpayer costs by 40%.

In North Carolina, AOT reduced the percentage of persons refusing medications to 30%, compared to 66% of patients not under AOT.

In Ohio, AOT increased attendance at outpatient psychiatric appointments from 5.7 to 13.0 per year. It increased attendance at day treatment sessions from 23 to 60 per year. "During the first 12 months of outpatient commitment, patients experienced significant reductions in visits to the psychiatric emergency service, hospital admissions, and lengths of stay compared with the 12 months before commitment."

In Arizona, "71% [of AOT patients] ... voluntarily maintained treatment contacts six months after their orders expired" compared with "almost no patients" who were not court-ordered to outpatient treatment.

In Iowa, "it appears as though outpatient commitment promotes treatment compliance in about 80% of patients... After commitment is terminated, about ¾ of that group remain in treatment on a voluntary basis."

=== Arguments against and opponents ===
Some human rights advocates consider involuntary commitment a potential violation of freedom of thought or opinion. They view the use of neuroleptics as a form of degrading treatment, which may impede individuals' right to work due to side effects that can be physically and mentally debilitating. There is a discussion surrounding the concept of self-determination or self-ownership, with some arguing that involuntary commitment represents a paternalistic approach that may be applied subjectively, as evidenced by studies questioning the reliability of psychiatric diagnoses, such as the Rosenhan experiment. Additionally, concerns have been raised regarding the indefinite duration of commitment and the lack of clear endpoints for treatment. Opponents of compulsory treatment challenge the positive effects often cited in studies, pointing to potential methodological flaws and disparities in applying related laws. The brain's physical size may be reduced during antipsychotic therapy long-term.

The slippery slope argument of "if government bodies are given power, they will use it in excess" was proven when 350–450 CTOs were expected to be issued in 2008, and more than five times that number were issued in the first few months. Every year, there are increasing numbers of people subject to CTOs.

The psychiatric survivors movement opposes involuntary commitment on the basis that the ordered drugs often have serious or unpleasant adverse effects, such as tardive dyskinesia, neuroleptic malignant syndrome, akathisia, excessive weight gain leading to diabetes, addiction, sexual side effects, increased risk of suicide and QT prolongation. The New York Civil Liberties Union has denounced what it sees as racial and socioeconomic biases in the issuing of outpatient commitment orders. The main opponents to any kind of coercion, including outpatient commitment and any other form of involuntary commitment, are Giorgio Antonucci and Thomas Szasz.

== See also ==
US specific:

- Laura's Law
- MindFreedom International

General:

- Deinstitutionalisation
- Psychiatric reform in Italy
- Giorgio Antonucci
