= National Alliance on Mental Illness =

American nonprofit organization

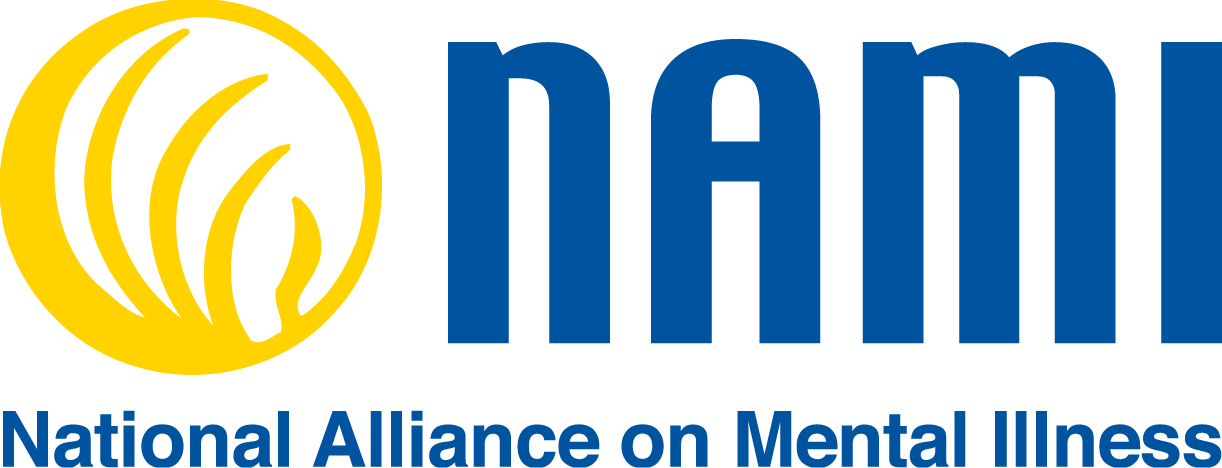
- Founded: 1979; 47 years ago
- Founders: Harriet Shetler; Beverly Young
- Type: Nonprofit 501(c)(3)
- Tax ID no.: 43-1201653
- Purpose: Mental Health, Crisis Intervention
- Headquarters: 4301 Wilson Blvd., Arlington County, Virginia, U.S.
- Region served: United States
- Method: Support, education, awareness, advocacy, and research
- Website: nami.org

The National Alliance on Mental Illness (NAMI) is a United States–based nonprofit organization originally founded as a grassroots group by family members of people diagnosed with mental illness. NAMI identifies its mission as "providing advocacy, education, support and public awareness so that all individuals and families affected by mental illness can build better lives" and its vision as "a world where all people affected by mental illness live healthy, fulfilling lives supported by a community that cares". NAMI offers classes and trainings for people living with mental illnesses, their families, community members, and professionals, including what is termed psychoeducation, or education about mental illness. NAMI holds regular events which combine fundraising for the organization and education, including Mental Illness Awareness Week and NAMIWalks.

Headquartered in Arlington, Virginia, NAMI has around 1,000 state and local affiliates and is represented in all 50 U.S. states, Washington, D.C., and Puerto Rico. Funding comes from individual contributions, corporate sponsorships, events, and grants. NAMI publishes a magazine around twice a year called The Advocate. NAMI also runs a HelpLine five days a week.

== History ==
NAMI was founded in Madison, Wisconsin, by Harriet Shetler and Beverly Young. The two women both had sons diagnosed with schizophrenia, and "were tired of being blamed for their sons' mental illness". Unhappy with the lack of services available and the treatment of those living with mental illness, the women sought out others with similar concerns. The first meeting held to address these issues in mental health led to the formation of the National Alliance for the Mentally Ill in 1979. In 1997, the legal name was changed to the acronym NAMI by a vote of the membership due to concerns that the name National Alliance for the Mentally Ill did not use person-first language. In 2005, the meaning of NAMI was changed to the backronym National Alliance on Mental Illness.

== Mission ==
NAMI identifies its mission as to promote recovery by preserving and strengthening family relationships "affected by mental illness". NAMI's programs and services include education, support groups, informational publications, and presentations. Although originally focused primarily on family members, in more recent years NAMI has moved toward trying to include people diagnosed with mental illness as well (although activists have criticized these efforts). In addition, NAMI has a strong focus on discriminatory attitudes and behaviors about mental illness (what they term stigma); another identified goal is "to increase public and professional understanding", and "to improve the mental health system".

== Structure ==
The National Alliance on Mental Illness is a 501(c)(3) nonprofit run by a board of directors who are elected by membership. NAMI National is the umbrella organization; state and local affiliates operate semi-independently, in an attempt to more accurately represent those in the surrounding communities. Since 2020, NAMI has been using a five-year strategic plan.

The current chief executive officer is Daniel H. Gillison, Jr., who prior to NAMI led the American Psychiatric Association Foundation (APAF), the nonprofit arm of American Psychiatric Association.

The national chief executive officer from 2014 to 2019 was Mary Giliberti, who resigned on April 24, 2019. Gilberti has a law degree from Yale University and clerked for Judge Phyllis A. Kravitch. Before coming to NAMI, Giliberti worked as a senior attorney at Bazelon Center for Mental Health Law for almost ten years and the Senate Health, Education, Labor, and Pensions Committee from 2008 to 2014. She worked for NAMI National during this time as the director of public policy and advocacy for federal and state issues. In 2017, she was "appointed by the Secretary of the U.S. Department of Health and Human Service (HHS) to serve as one of 14 non-federal members of HHS’ Interdepartmental Serious Mental Illness Coordinating Committee."

National and state NAMI organizations function to provide Governance, Public Education, Political Advocacy, and management of NAMI's Educational Programs. At the local level, local NAMI chapters also provide assistance in obtaining mental health resources, scheduling and administration of NAMI's programs, and hosting local meetings and events for NAMI members.

In February 2020, NAMI Sioux Falls merged with the South Dakota Office. The move was a result of a decision by the national NAMI office.

== Partnerships ==
=== Celebrities ===
NAMI has partnered with a number of celebrities and influencers, including:

- AJ Lee
- Alessandra Torresani
- Andrea Barber
- Brittany McGowan
- Carly Chaikin
- Chris Hubbard
- Chris Wood
- Clark Gregg
- Corinne Foxx
- David Kendrick
- DeWanda Wise
- Frank Shamrock
- Jamie Gray Hyder
- Jeannie Mai
- Maria Bamford
- Marin Hinkle
- Master P
- Maurice Benard
- Mauro Ranallo
- Mayim Bialik
- Morgan Stewart
- Nadya Okamoto
- Naomi Judd
- Rachel Bloom
- Stefania Owen
- Sterling K. Brown
- Sutton Stracke
- Taraji P. Henson
- Tritonal
- Utkarsh Ambudkar
- Vincent Valentine
- Wil Wheaton
- Willa Amai

=== CEO Alliance for Mental Health ===
Beginning in 2020, NAMI CEO Daniel Gillison, Jr. has assembled a coalition of leaders of national mental health organizations to "chart a new course" for the country's care system. The coalition includes representatives from the American Foundation for Suicide Prevention, American Psychiatric Association, American Psychological Association, Massachusetts Association of Mental Health, Meadows Mental Health Policy Institute, Mental Health America, National Association for Behavioral Healthcare, National Council for Mental Wellbeing, and Treatment Advocacy Center, among others.

=== Community partners ===
NAMI works with non-partisan VoteRiders to spread state-specific information on voter ID requirements.

Additional partners include:

- Alpha Kappa Alpha
- Counter Logic Gaming
- Fox Sports
- HOSA-Future Health Professionals
- Instagram
- Jack and Jill of America
- The Jed Foundation
- Lokai
- Stanley Center for Psychiatric Research at Broad Institute
- Tumblr
- Women's Health

== Philosophy and positions ==
NAMI generally endorses a medical model approach to mental illnesses, and previously was a major proponent of terming them "serious brain disorders" during the "decade of the brain". NAMI endorses the term anosognosia, or "that someone is unaware of their own mental health condition or that they can’t perceive their condition accurately". While NAMI previously referred to mental illnesses as "serious brain disorders", current advice on their "How we talk about NAMI" page recommends against this language.

=== Advocacy ===
NAMI advocates to improve the lives of people affected by mental health conditions. Their policy priorities include improving healthcare, crisis response, and stopping discrimination and harmful practices.

== Programs ==
NAMI programs are generally in the area of support and education for individuals and families, often for no cost. The programs are set up through local NAMI Affiliate organizations, with different programs varying in their targeted audience.

=== NAMI Family-to-Family ===
The NAMI Family-to-Family Education Program is a free eight-week course targeted toward family and friends of individuals with mental illness, providing education from a medical model perspective of mental illness. Originally offered as a twelve-week program, but updated to a shorter model in 2020, the courses are taught by a NAMI-trained family member of a person diagnosed with a psychiatric disorder. Family-to-Family is taught in 44 states, and two provinces in Canada. The program was developed by clinical psychologist Joyce Burland. Facilitators are required to teach material from the curriculum without alteration.

==== Purpose ====
The Family-to-Family program provides general information about mental illness and how it is currently treated from a medical model perspective. The programs cover mental illnesses including schizophrenia, depression, bipolar disorder, etc., as well as the indications and side effects of medications. Family-to-Family takes a biologically-based approach to explaining mental illness and its treatments.

According to the NAMI website, Family-to-Family program states its goals as teaching coping and advocacy skills, providing mutual support, how to "handle a crisis", "information on mental health conditions and how they affect the brain", and locating resources in the community

==== Evidence Base ====
The NAMI Family-to-Family program has initial research evidence; one randomized clinical trial showed gains in empowerment, increases in problem solving and reductions in participant anxiety scores following the class; these changes persisted at 6 month follow up. These studies confirm an earlier finding that Family-to-Family graduates describe a permanent transformation in the understanding and engagement with mental illness in themselves and their family. Because a randomized controlled trial is at risk of poor external validity by mechanism of self-selection, Dixon and colleges sought out to strengthen the evidence base by confirming the benefits attributed to Family-to-Family with a subset of individuals who declined participation during initial studies

The NAMI Family-to-Family program was found to increase self efficacy in family members involved in caring for a family member with schizophrenia while reducing subjective burden and need for information. In light of recent research, Family-to-Family was added to the SAMHSA National Registry of Evidence-Based Programs and Practices (NREPP), although as of January 2018 this database and designation has been eliminated by SAMHSA.

=== NAMI Peer-to-Peer ===
The NAMI Peer-to-Peer is an eight-week educational program aimed at adults diagnosed with a mental illness. The NAMI Peer-to-Peer program describes the course as a holistic approach to recovery through lectures, discussions, interactive exercises, and teaching stress management techniques. The program provides information about biological explanations of mental illness, symptoms, and personal experiences. The program also includes information about interacting with healthcare providers as well as decision making and stress reducing skills. The Peer-to-Peer philosophy is advertised as being centered around certain values such as individuality, autonomy, and unconditional positive regard. The program is also available in Spanish

Preliminary studies have suggested Peer-to-Peer provided many of its purported benefits (e.g. self-empowerment, disorder management, confidence). Peer interventions in general have been studied more extensively, having been found to increase social adjustment

=== NAMI In Our Own Voice ===
The NAMI In Our Own Voice (IOOV) program started as a mental health consumer education program for people living with schizophrenia in 1996, and was further developed to IOOV with grant funding from Eli Lily & Co. in 2002. The program was based on the idea that those successfully living with mental illness were experts in a sense, and sharing their stories would benefit those with similar struggles. The program approached this by relaying the idea that recovery is possible, attempting to build confidence and self-esteem. Because of the initial success of the program and positive reception, IOOV also took on the role of public advocacy.

NAMI In Our Own Voice involves two trained speakers presenting personal experiences related to mental illness, in front of an audience. Unlike the majority of NAMI's programs, IOOV consists of a single presentation educating groups of individuals with the acknowledgement many are likely unfamiliar with mental illness. The program's aims include raising awareness regarding NAMI and mental illness in general, addressing stigma, and empowering those affected by mental illness. Other than those directly affected by mental illness, In Our Own Voice often educates groups of individuals like law enforcement, politicians, and students.

In Our Own Voice has been shown to be superior at reducing self stigmatization of families when compared to clinician led education. Research into the effectiveness of the NAMI In Our Own Voice program has shown the program also can be of benefit to Graduate level therapists and adolescents. A 2016 study evaluating IOOV in California found significant reductions in desire for social distancing after attending an IOOV presentation, although no validated measures were used in the evaluation.

=== NAMI Basics ===
The NAMI Basics Program is a six-session course for parents or other primary caregivers of children and adolescents living with mental illness. NAMI Basics is conceptually similar to NAMI Family-to-Family in that it aims to educate families, but recognizes providing care for a child living with mental illness presents unique challenges in parenting, and that mental illness in children typically manifest differently than in adults. Because of the development of the brain and nervous system throughout childhood and adolescence, information regarding mental illness biology and its presentation is fundamentally different from with adults. The NAMI Basics program has a relatively short time course to accommodate parents' difficulty in attending because of their caregiver status.

=== NAMI Connection ===
The NAMI Connection Recovery Support Group Program is a weekly support group for adults living with mental illness. The program is for adults 18+ diagnosed with mental illness and groups are usually weekly for 90 minutes. The support groups are led by trained facilitators who identify as having experienced mental illness themselves.

=== NAMI On Campus ===
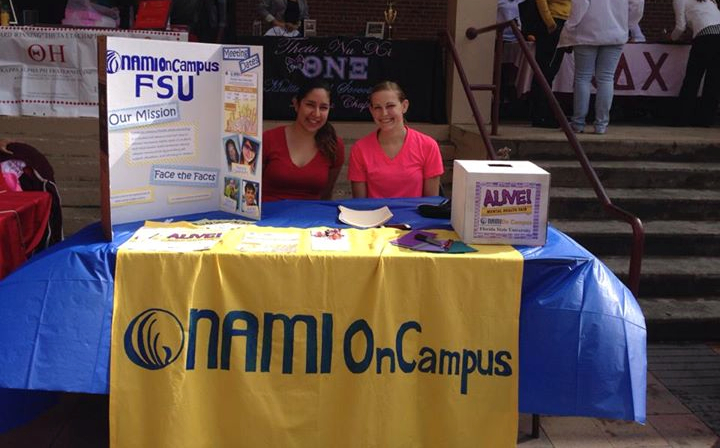
Students promoting a university affiliated NAMI On Campus organization

NAMI On Campus is an initiative for university students to start NAMI On Campus organizations within their respective universities. NAMI On Campus was started to address the mental health issues of college-aged students. Adolescence and early adulthood are periods where the onset of mental illness is common, with 75 percent of mental illnesses beginning by age 24. When asked what barriers, if any, prevented them from gaining support and treatment, surveys found stigma to be the number one barrier.

=== Ending the Silence ===
This 50-minute or one hour program is available for students, school staff, and family members. It involves two presenters: one who shares educational information and one who is a young adult living well in recovery who shares their personal story. This program has been shown to improve the mental health knowledge of middle- and high school students.

In 2017, Former Second Lady of the United States Tipper Gore gave a $1 million donation to the Ending the Silence program.

== Funding ==
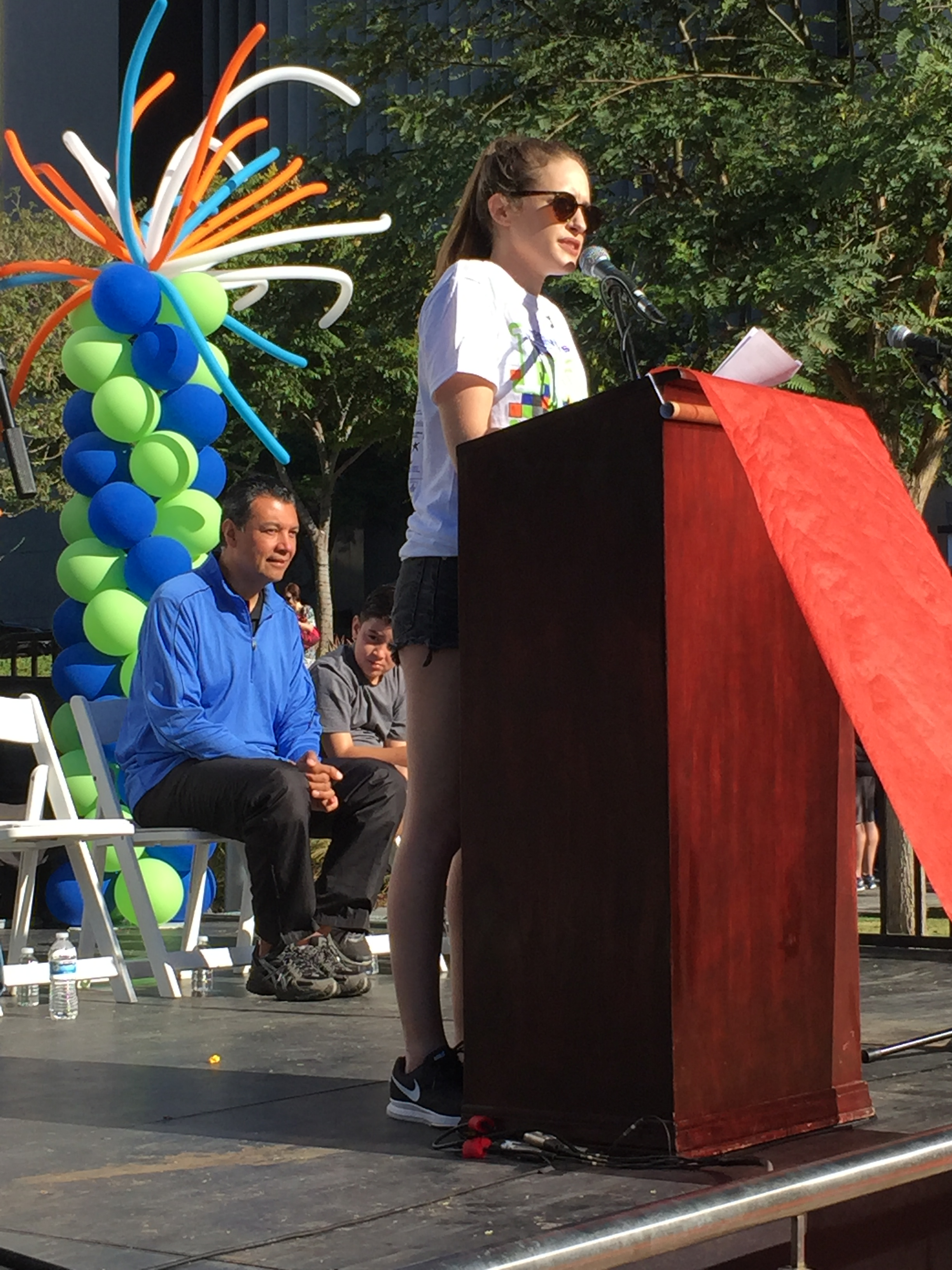
Actress Carly Chaikin emceeing the 2016 NAMI Los Angeles Walk and introducing Secretary of State Alex Padilla

NAMI receives funding from both private and public sources, including corporations, federal agencies, foundations and individuals. NAMI maintains that it is committed to avoiding conflicts of interest and does not endorse nor support any specific service or treatment. Records of NAMI's quarterly grants and contributions since 2009 are freely available on its website.

In 2017, NAMI had a 16% increase in overall revenue.

=== Corporate sponsors ===
NAMI's current and recent corporate sponsors include:

- Acadia Pharmaceuticals
- Alkermes
- Bank of America
- Beacon Health Options
- Boehringer Ingelheim
- Boeing
- Bristol Myers Squibb
- Chiesi Global Rare Diseases
- Corcept Therapeutics
- Genentech
- Janssen
- Kaiser Permanente
- KPMG Foundation
- Lululemon
- Lundbeck
- Myriad Genetics
- Neurocrine Biosciences
- NeuroStar
- Northrop Grumman
- Novo
- Otsuka Pharmaceutical
- Pfizer
- Sunovion
- Takeda Pharmaceutical Company
- Teva Pharmaceuticals

=== NAMIWalks ===
The 2017 annual report noted "$11.3 million raised across the country by 68,000 participants."

=== COVID-19 Mental Health Support Fund ===
NAMI launched the COVID-19 Mental Health Support Fund in response to the COVID-19 pandemic. The fund received donations from its corporate partners as well as the Center for Disaster Philanthropy, Hearst Foundation, Johnson & Johnson, Kind, LivaNova, Starbucks and Thrive Global. NAMI also launched the Frontline Wellness program to support healthcare workers, funded by the American College of Emergency Physicians, Harvard T.H. Chan School of Public Health, and various corporations.

=== Criticism ===
The funding of NAMI by multiple pharmaceutical companies was reported by the investigative magazine Mother Jones in 1999, including that an Eli Lilly and Company executive was then "on loan" to NAMI working out of NAMI headquarters.

During a 2009 investigation into the drug industry's influence on the practice of medicine, U.S. Senator Chuck Grassley (R-IA) sent letters to NAMI and about a dozen other influential disease and patient advocacy organizations asking about their ties to drug and device makers. The investigation confirmed pharmaceutical companies provided a majority of NAMI's funding, a finding which led to NAMI releasing documents listing donations over $5,000.

Dr. Peter Breggin, a leader of the anti-psychiatry movement and opponent of COVID-19 lockdowns, refers to NAMI as an "AstroTurf lobbying organization" of the "psychopharmaceutical complex."

== See also ==
- Biological Psychiatry
- Cole Resource Center
- Depression and Bipolar Support Alliance
- Moon Knight—episodes' end credits end with disclaimers relating to NAMI
- Psychiatric survivors movement
- Self-help groups for mental health
- Treatment Advocacy Center
