= Sell v. United States =

- Supreme Court of the United States

Argued March 3, 2003 Decided June 16, 2003
- Full case name: Charles Thomas Sell, Petitioner v. United States
- Citations: 539 U.S. 166 (more) 123 S. Ct. 2174; 156 L. Ed. 2d 197; 2003 U.S. LEXIS 4594; 71 U.S.L.W. 4456; 188 A.L.R. Fed. 679; 2003 Cal. Daily Op. Service 5131; 2003 Daily Journal DAR 6512; 16 Fla. L. Weekly Fed. S 359

Case history
- Prior: Order granting permission to administer drug, United States v. Sell, No. 4:98-cr-177 (E.D. Mo. Aug. 9, 2000); affirmed, 2001 WL 35838455, 2001 U.S. Dist. LEXIS 26009 (E.D. Mo. Apr. 4, 2001); affirmed, 282 F.3d 560 (8th Cir. 2002); cert. granted, 537 U.S. 999 (2002).
- Subsequent: Remanded to district court, 343 F.3d 950 (8th Cir. 2003).

Holding
- Drugs to make defendant competent to stand trial may be administered involuntarily under very limited circumstances.

Court membership
- Chief Justice William Rehnquist Associate Justices John P. Stevens · Sandra Day O'Connor; Antonin Scalia · Anthony Kennedy; David Souter · Clarence Thomas; Ruth Bader Ginsburg · Stephen Breyer

Case opinions
- Majority: Breyer, joined by Rehnquist, Stevens, Kennedy, Souter, Ginsburg
- Dissent: Scalia, joined by O'Connor, Thomas

Laws applied
- U.S. Const. amend. VI, XIV

Sell v. United States, 539 U.S. 166 (2003), is a decision in which the United States Supreme Court imposed stringent limits on the right of a lower court to order the forcible administration of antipsychotic medication to a criminal defendant who had been determined to be incompetent to stand trial for the sole purpose of making them competent and able to be tried. Specifically, the court held that lower courts could do so only under limited circumstances in which specified criteria had been met. In the case of Charles Sell, since the lower court had failed to determine that all the appropriate criteria for court-ordered forcible treatment had been met, the order to forcibly medicate the defendant was reversed.

Previously, in Washington v. Harper, the Supreme Court made clear that the forced medication of inmates with mental disorders could be ordered only when the inmate was a danger to themselves or others and when the medication is in the inmate's own best interests. In addition, courts must first consider "alternative, less intrusive means" before resorting to the involuntary administration of psychotropic medication.

Using the framework set forth in Riggins v. Nevada, the Court emphasized that an individual has a constitutionally protected "interest in avoiding involuntary administration of antipsychotic drugs" and this interest is one that only an "essential" or "overriding" state interest might overcome.

== Facts of the case ==
In 1997, Charles Thomas Sell, a St. Louis dentist with no prior history of criminal behavior, was charged with fifty-six counts of mail fraud, six counts of Medicaid fraud, and one count of money-laundering. That year a federal judge found Sell competent to stand trial and released him on bail. However, Sell's mental status deteriorated while he was on bail, and his bail was revoked in 1998. Also in 1998, on the basis of a videotape provided by an undercover agent, Sell was charged with one count of conspiring to commit the attempted murder of the Federal Bureau of Investigation officer arresting him. The agent later interviewed Sell in jail, and by questioning got him to say something about hiring a hit man. In early 1999 Sell requested a competency hearing before standing trial for the fraud and attempted murder charges.

Sell was given a competency evaluation by the United States Medical Center for Federal Prisoners (Medical Center), and in 1999 was found incompetent to stand trial. Sell was ordered to be hospitalized to determine whether he would be able to become competent so as to allow his trial to proceed. While in the hospital, Sell refused to take the antipsychotic medication prescribed by the Medical Center staff. The Medical Center sought to involuntarily medicate Sell. On June 9, 1999, an administrative hearing was held before a medical hearing officer who concluded that antipsychotic medication was the treatment of choice based on the fact that Dr. Sell's "delusional thinking could make him dangerous." Sell filed a court challenge to stop the hospital's decision to give him the drug involuntarily.

The question of whether the drug could be administered involuntarily was the subject of several other hearings. In August 2000 the magistrate found that Sell was a danger to himself and others, authorized Sell to be forcibly medicated on the grounds that only medication would reduce his dangerousness, that any serious side effects could be treated, that the benefits to Sell were greater than the risks, and that the medication were substantially likely to restore Sell's competence.

In 2001, Sell appealed on certiorari to the Federal District Court which, while reversing the federal magistrate's finding of dangerousness, upheld the order of forced medication on the grounds that it was necessary to restore Sell's competency to stand trial. The Eighth Circuit Court of Appeals affirmed the lower court's decision in a divided vote. Sell's attorney pointed out that Sell had already been incarcerated for a longer period of time than if he were convicted for the offenses as charged.

Sell, on Writ of Certiorari, appealed to the United States Supreme Court. The American Psychological Association filed an amicus curiae brief taking a neutral position, supporting neither the government's nor Sell's position.

== Decision ==
Although the Supreme Court upheld two aspects of the appeal, it ultimately vacated and remanded on the question of the petitioner's dangerousness.

- Held

In a divided opinion (6-3), the Court held that the Constitution allows the Federal Government to administer antipsychotic drugs, even against the defendant's will, in limited circumstances as decided previously in Washington v. Harper and Riggins v. Nevada. It affirmed that involuntary administration for the purposes of restoring a defendant's competency to stand trial can be an appropriate means of acting in the state's interest to bring to trial defendants who are charged with serious crimes, overriding the defendant's right to refuse forced medication. However, the court outlined specific criteria which must be satisfied to justify involuntary medication. This framework was outlined in Riggins v. Nevada.

1. An important government issue must be at stake and only a case by case inquiry can determine whether the government's interest is mitigated by the possibility of a long civil commitment for the treatment of the mental illness or by the fact that long periods of confinement have already been served, as this would be subtracted from any criminal sentence.
2. There must be a substantial probability that the medication will enable the defendant to become competent without substantial undermining side effects.
3. The medication must be necessary to restore the defendant's competency, with no alternative, less intrusive procedures available that would produce the same results.

[T]he Constitution permits the Government involuntarily to administer antipsychotic drugs to a mentally ill defendant facing serious criminal charges in order to render that defendant competent to stand trial, but only if the treatment is medically appropriate, is substantially unlikely to have side effects that may undermine the fairness of the trial, and, taking account of less intrusive alternatives, is necessary significantly to further important governmental trial-related interests.

- Held

The Supreme Court held that the Eighth Circuit Court of Appeals erred in approving the lower court's order to allow forced medication to restore Sell's competence to stand trial because the original decisions of the hospital and the judge were based on an assessment of Sell's dangerousness. Since the experts testifying at the hearings focused mainly on the issue of dangerousness and not on Sell's trial competence, there was not enough evidence in the court record regarding the possible effect of the medication on Sell's ability to obtain a fair trial.

- Vacated and remanded

In examining the lower courts' findings, the Court found no evidence that Sell was dangerous, so the Court assumed that he was not. Determining that the findings of the District Court and Court of Appeals did not satisfy the criteria for involuntary medication, the Court vacated the appellate court's judgment.

=== Summary ===
The Court in its decision wrote that the standards it outlined will allow involuntary medication for the sole purpose of rendering the defendant competent to stand trial only in rare instances. The standard implies that a court must find that important governmental interests are at stake and that its interest in bringing the accused to trial for serious crimes is important enough to override constitutional issues, and that the forced medication will not significantly interfere with the defense or have untoward side effects. Therefore, in each case the facts and circumstances must be considered individually, balancing the government's responsibility to ensure timely prosecution with an equal interest in making sure a defendant obtains a fair trial. The court must weigh these factors and decide if forced medication will significantly further or hinder these conflicting interests of the state.

== Significance ==
The Supreme Court laid down four criteria for cases involving the involuntary administration of medication to an incompetent pretrial defendant:

1. Did the defendant commit a serious crime?
2. Is there a substantial likelihood that involuntary medication will restore the defendant's competence and do so without causing side effects that will significantly interfere with the defendant's ability to assist counsel?
3. Is involuntary medication the least intrusive treatment for restoration of competence?
4. Is the proposed treatment medically appropriate?

It is unknown in how many cases involuntary administration will now be justified, and any procedure outlined by the Court will require the government to submit proof on all the criteria outlined by the court. Beyond the federal situation, any constitutional ruling will apply to all criminal proceedings, state as well as federal. However, although this decision possibly affects only a small percentage of trials, it seems to add weight to a growing acceptance of the belief that government can override the constitutional rights of self-determination on medical matters. The case potentially could have addressed a more serious question of whether governmental manipulation of an individual's mental state through psychotropic drug administration is based on false assumptions of what makes up a person's individuality. The court chose to sidestep this issue.

However, others disagreed, arguing that the strict limits imposed by the Supreme Court on involuntary medication meant that the involuntary medication of a non-dangerous defendant would be rare, especially since government's "important" interest in bringing the defendant to trial must be unattainable by alternative, less invasive means.

At the very least however, the criteria set forth by the court will ensure that the lower courts considering the issue of forced medication must determine why it is medically appropriate to force drug an individual who is not dangerous and furthermore is competent to make up his own mind about treatment.

== Subsequent developments ==
In 2004, Sell was found competent to stand trial and trial was scheduled. A week before the trial was to begin, the prosecution and defense claimed that he was mentally unfit for trial and the trial was discontinued.

On April 18, 2005, Sell pleaded no contest to federal charges of fraud and conspiracy to kill a federal agent, after serving eight years without trial in federal prison. The U.S. District Judge sentenced him to time served, six months in a halfway house and three years on parole.

== See also ==
- List of United States Supreme Court cases, volume 539
- List of United States Supreme Court cases
- Washington v. Harper
- Riggins v. Nevada
- Rennie v. Klein
