= Marchman Act =

1993 Florida law

The Marchman Act, officially the "Hal S. Marchman Alcohol and Other Drug Services Act of 1993", is a Florida law that provides a means of involuntary and voluntary assessment and stabilization and treatment of a person allegedly abusing alcohol or drugs.

Prior to October 1, 1993, substance abuse was addressed by chapters 396 and 397. Chapter 396 was primarily concerned with alcoholism while chapter 397, was more concerned with drug dependency. As of October 1, 1993, the new chapter 397, called the Hal S. Marchman Alcohol and Other Drug Services Act, superseded chapters 396 and 397. Unlike the prior chapters the new chapter 397, dubbed the “Marchman Act”, does not distinguish between drug dependency and alcoholism using the term “substance abuse.”

== Text of the act ==
INVOLUNTARY CATEGORIES AND CRITERIA

The involuntary assessment and treatment has two categories: court and non-court involved admissions. The criteria for involuntary admission is:

"There is good faith reason to believe the person is substance abuse impaired and, because of such impairment:

1. Has lost the power of self-control with respect to substance use; AND EITHER

2a. Has inflicted, or threatened or attempted to inflict, or unless admitted is likely to inflict, physical harm on himself or herself or another; OR

b. Is in need of substance abuse services and, by reason of substance abuse impairment, his or her judgment has been so impaired that the person is incapable of appreciating his or her need for such services and of making a rational decision in regard thereto; however, mere refusal to receive such services does not constitute evidence of lack of judgment with respect to his or her need for such services. "

It is under Title XXIX - PUBLIC HEALTH Chapter 397 -SUBSTANCE ABUSE SERVICES of the Florida Statutes. The links to these paragraphs are listed below:

PART IV

VOLUNTARY ADMISSIONS PROCEDURES

'397.601 Voluntary admissions.

PART V

INVOLUNTARY ADMISSIONS PROCEDURES

397.675-397.6977

A. General Provisions

B. Non-court Involved Admissions: Protective Custody

C. Non-court Involved Admissions; Emergency

D. Non-court Involved Admissions; Alternative Involuntary Assessment for Minors

E. Court Involved Admissions, Civil Involuntary Proceedings; Generally

F. Court Involved Admissions; Involuntary Assessment; Stabilization

G. Court Involved Admissions; Involuntary Treatment

PART VII

OFFENDER REFERRALS

397.705 Referral of substance abuse impaired offenders to service providers.

397.706 Screening, assessment, and disposition of juvenile offenders.

PART VIII

INMATE SUBSTANCE ABUSE PROGRAMS

397.752 Scope of part.

397.753 Definitions.

397.754 Duties and responsibilities of the Department of Corrections.

CRITERIA

Criteria for involuntary admission is listed under the 397.675.

TIMEFRAMES

⁃ 3–5 days for assessment under special conditions (minors or emergency admissions)

⁃ Non-Court protective custody is limited to 3 days (72 hours). The court can order involuntary treatment at a licensed service provider for a period not to exceed 60 days

⁃ The process can be slowed by external factors including but not limited to: utilization of the wrong forms, improper execution of forms, failure of the sheriff to serve the respondent, the Clerk of the Court's business schedule, Judicial schedule, and available hearing dates.

PROCEDURE

1. A sworn affidavit is signed at the local county courthouse or clerk's office.
2. A hearing is set before the court after a Petition for Involuntary Assessment and Stabilization is filed.
3. Following the hearing, the individual is held for up to five days for medical stabilization and assessment.
4. A Petition for Treatment must be filed with the court and a second hearing is held for the court to review the assessment.
5. Based on the assessment and the recommendation that the individual needs extended help, the judge can then order a 60-day treatment period with a possible 90-day extension, if necessary.
6. If the addict exits treatment in violation of the judge's order, the addict must return to court and answer to the court as to why they did not comply with treatment. Then the individual is returned immediately for involuntary care.
7. If the addict refuses, they are held in civil contempt of court for not following treatment order and are ordered to either return to treatment or be incarcerated.

COSTS

It is an unfunded state requirement and each community must allocate funds for it.

Additionally, there are filing fees with the court.

CONFIDENTIALITY

As of July 1, 2017 Florida Statute 397.6760 became effective making all petitions for involuntary assessment and stabilization, court orders, and related records that are filed with or by a court under 397 confidential and exempt from s. 119.071(1) and s. 24(a), Art. I of the State Constitution.
