= Involuntary treatment =

Medical treatment undertaken without the consent of the person being treated

Involuntary treatment or mandatory treatment refers to medical treatment undertaken without the consent of the person being treated. Involuntary treatment is permitted by law in some countries when overseen by the judiciary through court orders; other countries defer directly to the medical opinions of doctors.

Globally and even within countries, what is meant by the term "involuntary treatment" is not agreed upon. In/voluntary when applied to medical treatments could refer to a purely legal perspective, an entirely ethical lens, or with components of both. Therefore use of the term is best accompanied by specification to avoid confusion.

Some countries have general legislation allowing for any treatment deemed necessary if an individual is unable to consent to a treatment due to a perceived lack of capacity, other legislation may specifically deal with involuntary psychiatric treatment of individuals who have been diagnosed with a mental disorder. Psychiatric treatment normally happens in a psychiatric hospital after some form of involuntary commitment, though individuals may be compelled to undergo treatment outside of hospitals via outpatient commitment.

The diagnosis of mental disorders can be carried out by some form clinical practitioner, or in some cases law enforcement or others, to be a danger to themselves or to others is permitted in some jurisdictions, while other jurisdictions have more recently allowed for forced treatment for persons deemed to be "gravely disabled" or asserted to be at risk of psychological deterioration.

A patient may be detained because they are diagnosed with a psychiatric disorder or infectious disease.

== History ==
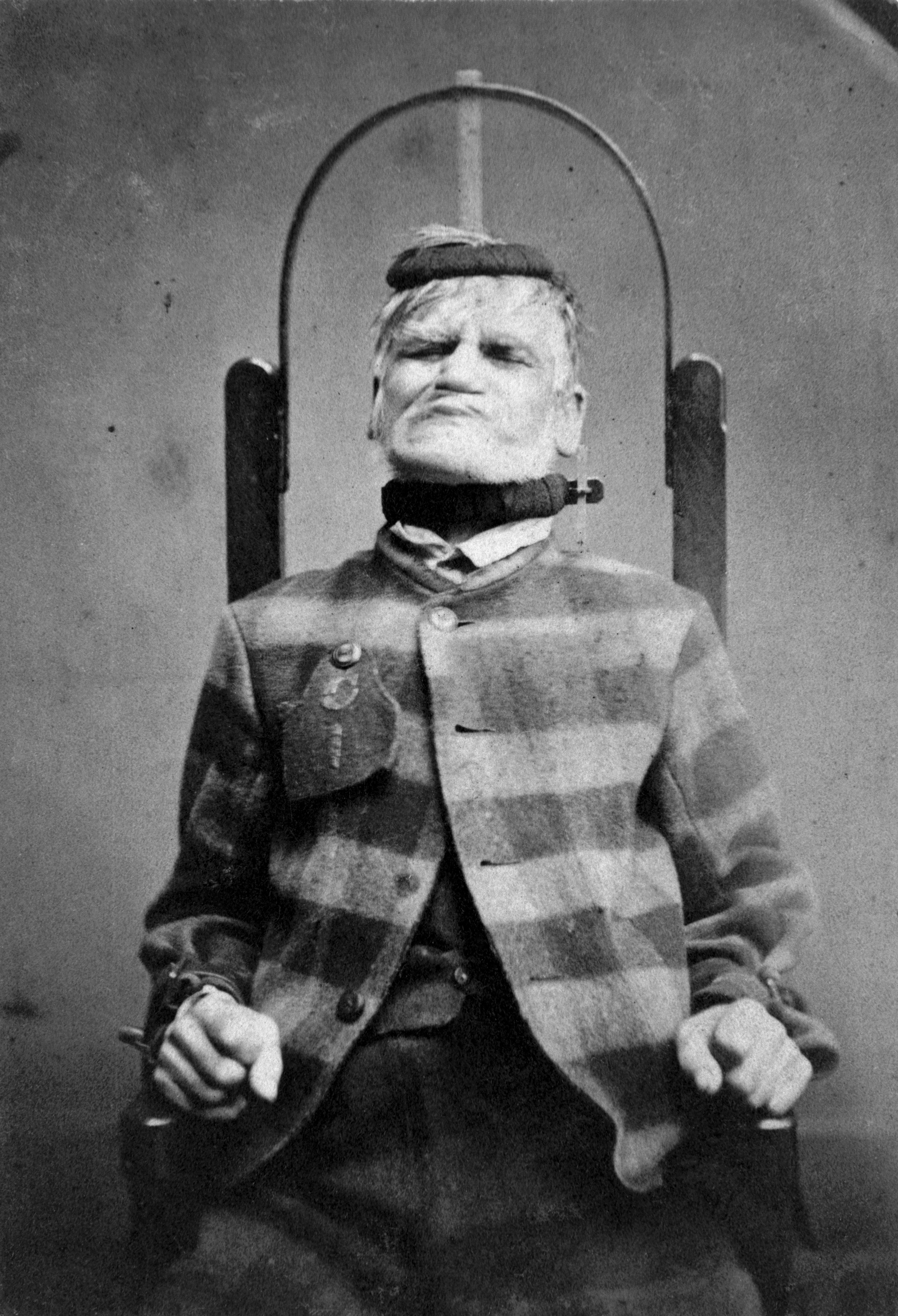
Man in restraint chair in an English asylum in 1869

In the early 20th century, many countries passed laws allowing the compulsory sterilization of some women. In the US more than half the states passed laws allowing the forced sterilization of people with certain illnesses or criminals as well as sterilization based on race. Forcible sterilization took place in the United States until at least 1981, more than 64 thousand people were forcibly sterilized. Denmark sterilized 60 thousand people between 1935 and 1976. During Nazi rule in Germany as part of their eugenics program about 600 thousand people were compulsorily sterilized.

Involuntary euthanasia was carried out in Nazi Germany for those who had certain psychiatric disorders or learning disabilities as part of the Aktion T4 program. This program was run by Karl Brandt, a medical doctor, and Philipp Bouhler. Victims were murdered together in gas chambers and this program was a prototype for the extermination camps such as Auschwitz where the Holocaust took place. As part of Action 14f13, physicians involved in the euthanasia program visited concentration camps where they looked at documentation provided by SS camp doctors and approved the murder of camp inmates on the grounds of race, behavior and ability to work using the euthanasia program's facilities.

Throughout the latter half of the 20th century, homosexual men in the UK were given the choice between chemical castration with female sex hormones or prison including, notably, Alan Turing.

Until 2004, every European state required that transgender people must be sterilized or provably infertile to have their preferred gender formally recognized. This practice continued in Sweden until 2012 and Denmark until 2014. Japan currently requires transgender people to be sterilized and have their ovaries removed to be recognized as a different gender.

=== Ethics and the law ===
The Hippocratic Corpus, an ancient Greek text discussing medical ethics, advises that physicians conceal most information from patients to give the patients the best care. The 1767 English case Slater vs Baker and Stapleton found against two doctors who had refractured a patient's leg without consent. Thomas Percival was a British physician who published a book called Medical Ethics in 1803, which makes no mention of soliciting for the consent of patients or respecting their decisions. Percival said that patients have a right to truth, but when the physician could provide better treatment by lying or withholding information, he advised that the physician do as he thought best. Benjamin Rush, an 18th-century United States physician, in a lecture entitled "On the duties of patients to their physicians", stated that patients should be strictly obedient to the physician's orders; this was representative of much of his writings.

The US Canterbury v. Spence case established the principle of informed consent in US law. Earlier legal cases had created the underpinnings for informed consent, but his judgment gave a detailed and thought-through discourse on the matter. The judgment cites cases going back to 1914 as precedent for informed consent.

=== Infectious disease ===
In response to the bubonic plague, some city states restricted movement of people into them using cordon sanitaires, and separated those were suspected of being infected into makeshift camps. Merchant sailors were made to isolate in lazarettos, hospitals for infectious diseases. England created quarantine regulations in 1663 to confine ships suspected of being infected with the plague. In response to cholera outbreaks in the 1830s, some European cities people with symptoms were forced into lazarettos. An 1853 law in the United Kingdom made vaccination compulsory with those refusing to comply receiving fines. People with symptoms of tuberculosis have been detained in New York from 1902. During the Spanish flu pandemic western cities implemented social distancing and closed schools, churches, theatres and restricted public gatherings. During the COVID-19 pandemic many countries implemented lockdowns restricting movement, enforcing working from home and social distancing.

=== Mental health ===
In 1789, during the French Revolution, the French government issued a directive for the management of the insane. This directive ordered that the insane be incarcerated and treated. Bethlem Royal Hospital is a mental hospital in the United Kingdom, which started exclusively treating mental illness in 1377. In 1818, Urban Metcalf, a patient at Bethlam, published a book describing his experience there. He described physical restraint of patients who were attached to walls. This followed a report by the government in 1815 describing conditions in asylums in the UK.

=== Political use ===
Psychiatric diagnoses have been used for political purposes. Psychiatry can be used to bypass standard legal procedures and political incarceration. The use of hospitals instead of jails prevents those detainend from receiving legal aid, makes indefinite incarceration possible, discredits the individuals and their ideas. During the Nazi era and the Soviet rule religious and political dissenters were labeled as "mentally ill" and subjected to inhumane "treatments". From the 1960s to 1986, abuse of psychiatry for political and ideological purposes was reported to be systematic in the Soviet Union, and occasional in Eastern European countries such as Romania, Hungary, Czechoslovakia and Yugoslavia.

== Legislative distinctions ==
Legislation may allow for involuntary treatment of a particular disease or class of diseases such as mental disorders. Some countries have legislation to involuntarily detain or examine those suspected to have tuberculosis, or treat them if infected. Some countries have general legislation allowing for any treatment deemed necessary if an individual is unable to consent to a treatment due to lack of capacity.

Those treated for mental health disorders are committed before involuntary treatment. Those under community treatment orders (also known as outpatient commitment in some countries) may be ordered to take medication, and if they fail to may be committed and treated involuntarily.

In some countries, involuntary treatment for mental health is not used to treat a symptom that is present, but rather to reduce the risk of symptoms returning through the use prophylactic psychotropic medication. This is achieved through the use of outpatient commitment where a patient may be detained in hospital if they fail to take the medication doctors have prescribed them.

== Forms ==
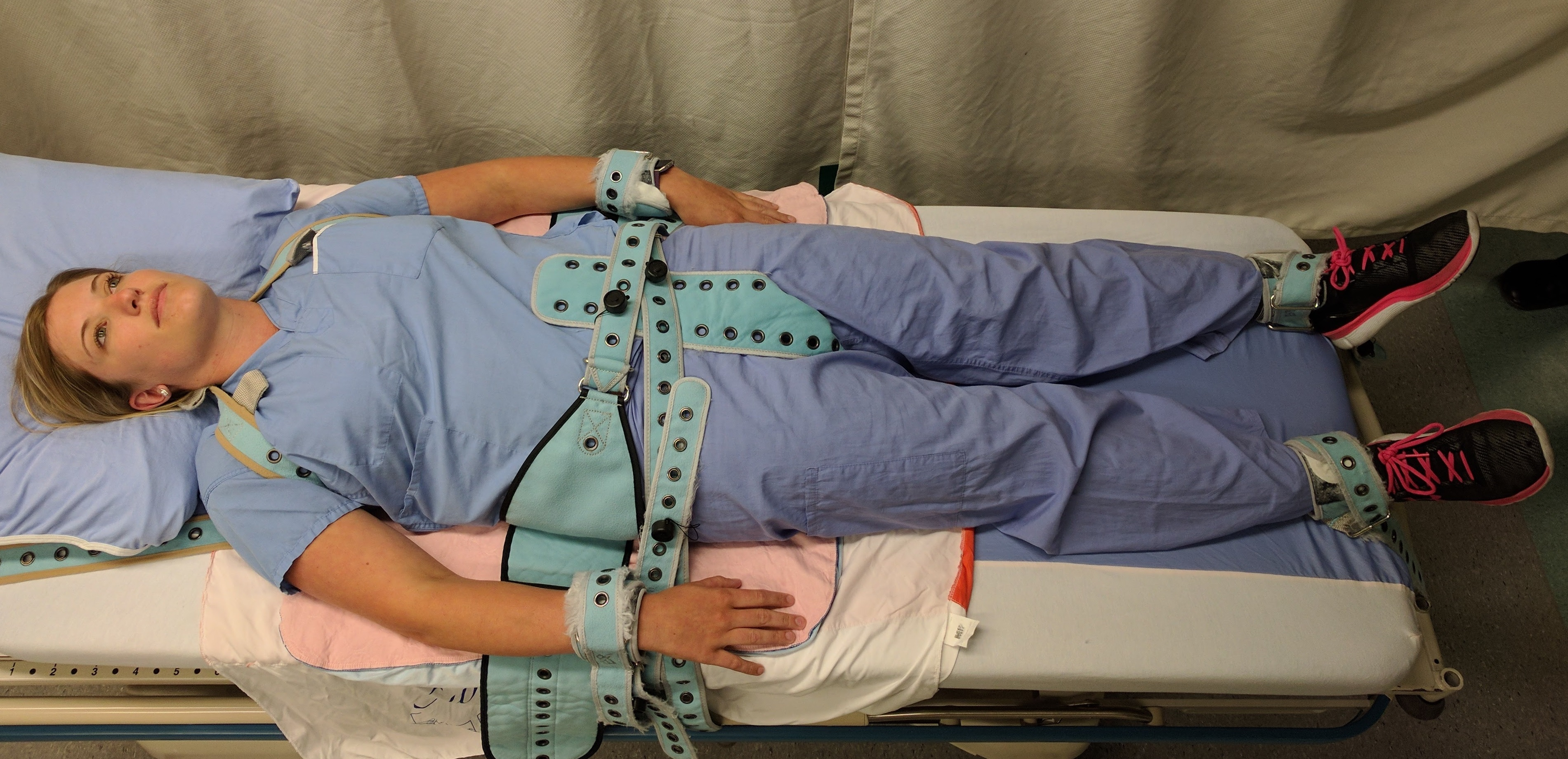
Standard modern-day restraints

Chemical restraint, such as forcible injection with the antipsychotic haloperidol or benzodiazepine sedative midazolam, may be used to sedate a patient who is agitated. In some countries, antipsychotics and sedatives can be forcibly administered to those who are committed, using intramuscular depot injection. Those with anorexia nervosa may receive force-feeding.

Those with infectious diseases such as tuberculosis can be detained and isolated. Brazil, Bulgaria, Costa Rica, Croatia, Czech Republic, France, Hungary, Indonesia, Italy, Poland and Russia make certain vaccinations mandatory.

In the Czech Republic, men convicted of sex offenses are in practice given the choice of long-term detention or castration. Japan requires transgender people to undergo sterilization to have their gender formally recognized.

=== Coercion in voluntary mental health treatment ===
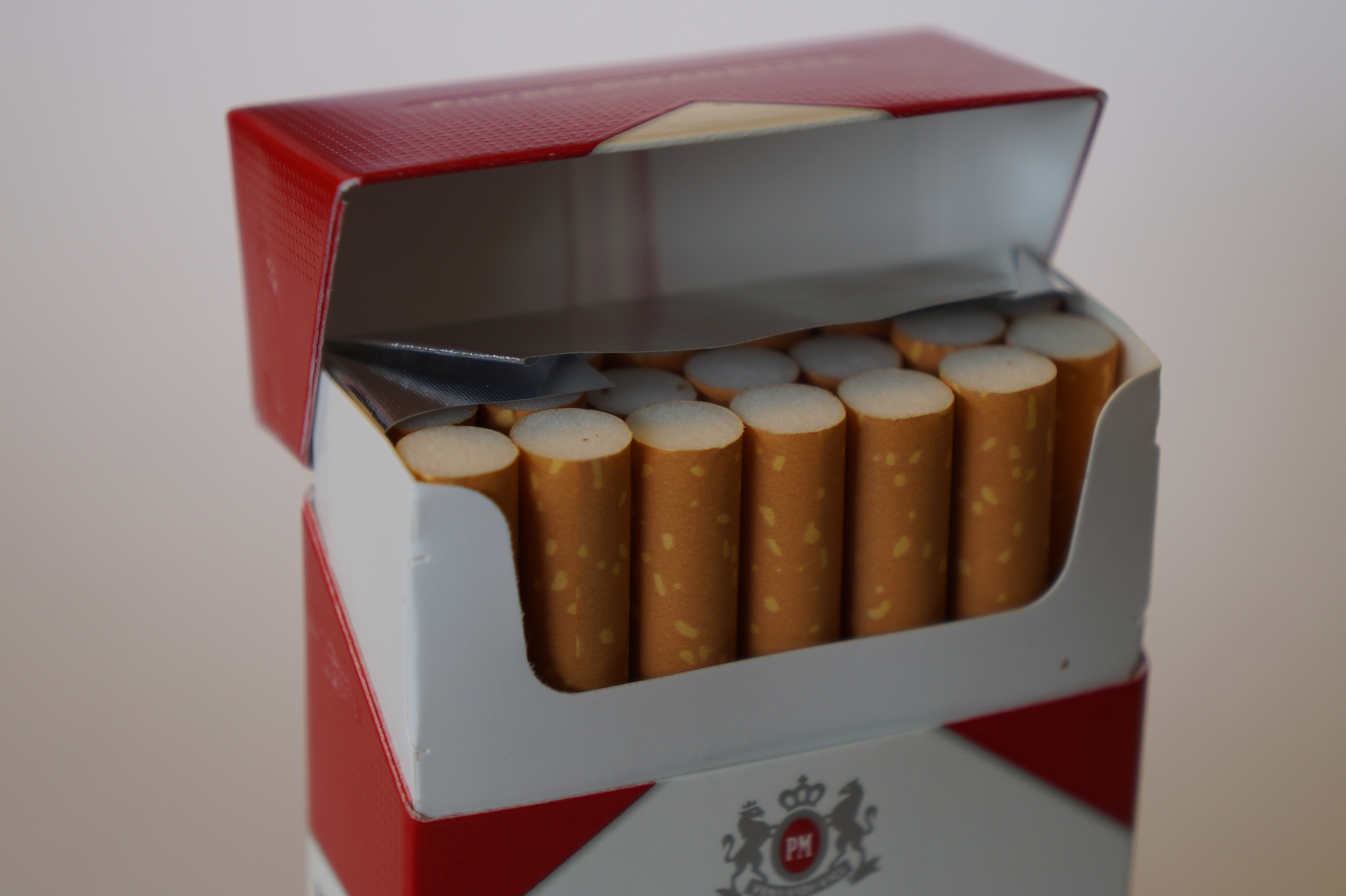
Inducements such as access to cigarettes are used as leverage to encourage patients to accept treatment.

There is no consensus regarding the use of terminology "voluntary" and "involuntary" in psychiatric, behavioral, and mental health services. An important distinction is whether the in/voluntary descriptor refers to a specific law, or if it is being applied more generally in the sense of ethics. When used by clinicians in the scientific literature, about two-thirds of in/voluntary terms were defined primarily from a legal perspective and one-third were defined mainly from an ethical perspective.

Individuals may be forced to undergo mental health treatment which is legally "voluntary" under the threat of involuntary treatment. Many individuals who legally would be viewed as receiving mental health treatment voluntarily believe that they have no choice in the matter. (Note: "A significant proportion of voluntarily admitted service userscan experience the same level of perceived coercion as that experienced by involuntarily admitted service users. It needs to be ensured that if any service user, whether voluntary or involuntary, experiences treatment pressures or coercion, that there is sufficient oversight of the practice to ensure that individual's rights are respected.")

Once voluntarily within a mental health hospital, rules, process, and information asymmetry (the fact that healthcare providers know more about how the hospital functions than a patient) can be used to achieve compliance from a person in voluntary treatment. To prevent someone from leaving voluntarily, staff may use stalling tactics made possible by the fact that all doors are locked. For example, the person may be referred to a member of staff who is rarely on the ward, or made to wait until after lunch or a meeting, behaving as if a person in voluntary treatment does not have the right to leave without permission. When the person is able to talk about leaving, the staff may use vague language to imply that the person is required to stay, relying on the fact that people in voluntary treatment do not understand their legal status. (Note: See section 6.1 entitled "stalling" in. From this section: "[T]he patient's mistaken belief that she cannot leave the hospital facilitates the staff's efforts to stall her. Most importantly, uncertainties regarding formal status make it possible for clinicians to phrase persuasive statements in strategic ways. At times, they might use words that connote coercion where coercion is not formally used. At other times, they might use words of cooperation when formal coercion is in fact applied. Similarly, particular symptoms of the patient, such as a temporary inability to concentrate, might serve as a resource for the staff in managing information in order to accomplish compliance.")

Szmukler and Appelbaum constructed a hierarchy of types of coercion in mental health care, ranging from persuasion to interpersonal leverage, inducements, threats and compulsory treatment. Here persuasion refers to argument through reason. Forms of coercion that do not use legal compulsion are referred to as informal coercion or leverage. Interpersonal leverage may arise from the desire to please health workers with whom a relationship has formed. Threats may revolve around a health worker helping or hindering the receipt of government benefits. Studies show that 51%, 35% and 29% of mental health patients have experienced some form of informal coercion in the US, England and Switzerland respectively.

=== Non-voluntary treatment ===
In certain limited circumstance a patient may have capacity but be unable to consent to treatment at a time when a decision is necessary, in such cases surgery may be performed on a patient without consent. A patient may issue an advance healthcare directive specifying how they would like to be treated if they are unable to consent to treatment. In the UK, a healthcare worker does not need to follow an advanced directive but they will influence decisions. Alternatively, a surrogate decision-maker such as a relative, friend or healthcare professional may make decisions on a patient's behalf if a patient is unable to.

=== Covert treatment ===
In some instances when a patient refuses the medication suggested by a healthcare professional healthcare workers will cause a patient to take the medication by hiding medication in their food a practice known as covert medication.

== Competent adults ==
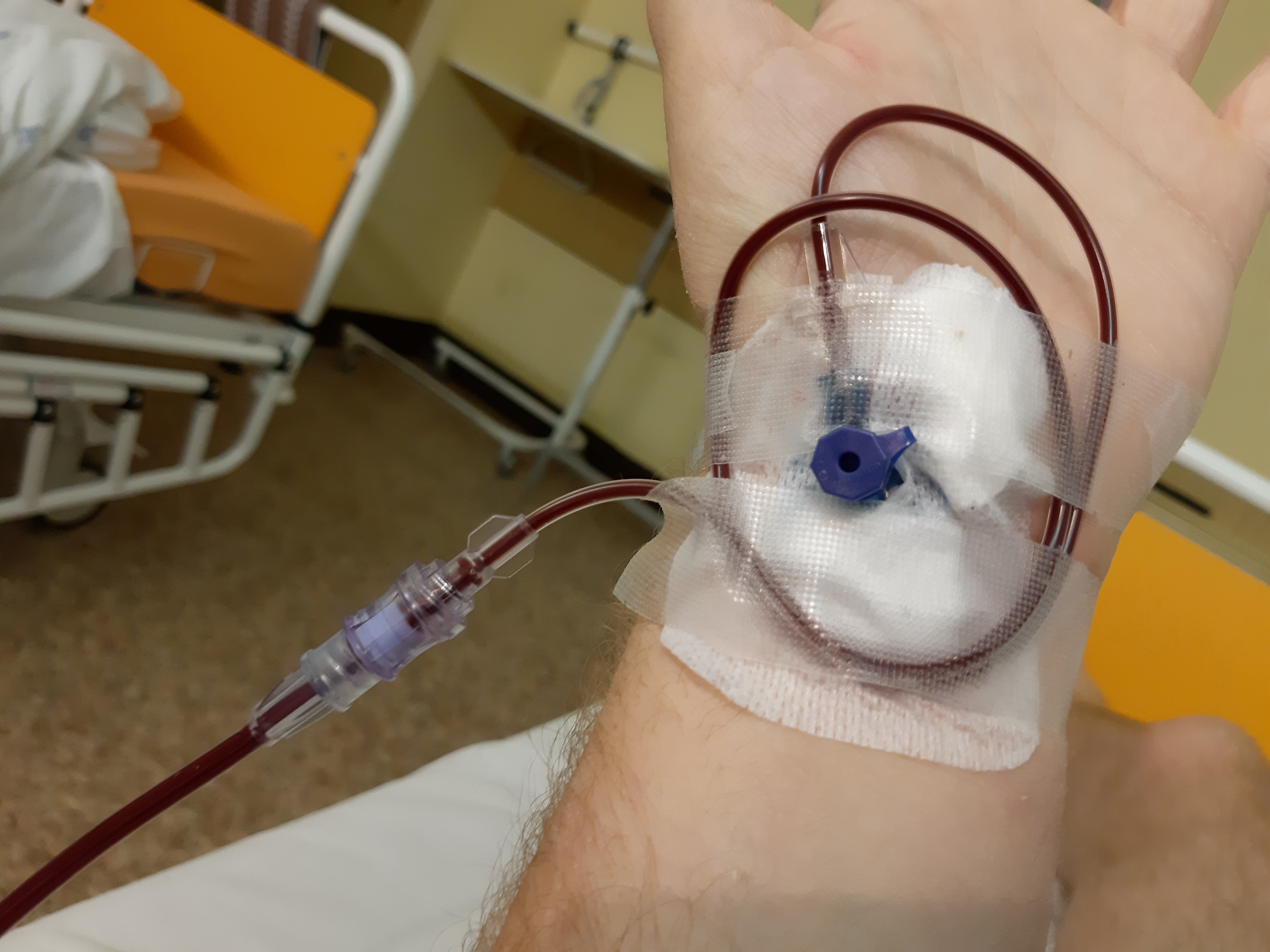
Some Jehovah's Witnesses will choose to die rather than accept blood transfusions.

The faith of Jehovah's Witnesses forbids blood transfusion. Courts in the United States have consistently upheld the right of competent adults to decline blood transfusion even when it would be life-saving, though there have been exceptions where the death of a patient could leave a child orphaned.

In the United States, courts have ordered pregnant women to involuntarily undergo caesarean section, intrauterine transfusion, and enforced bed rest. There are cases of clinicians threatening pregnant patients with removal of child custody or withdrawal of care if they decline treatment. In the UK, courts are unable to force treatment on pregnant women who are deemed to have capacity, however as of 2016 there were no cases of a still pregnant woman being deemed to have capacity by a court.

== Children ==
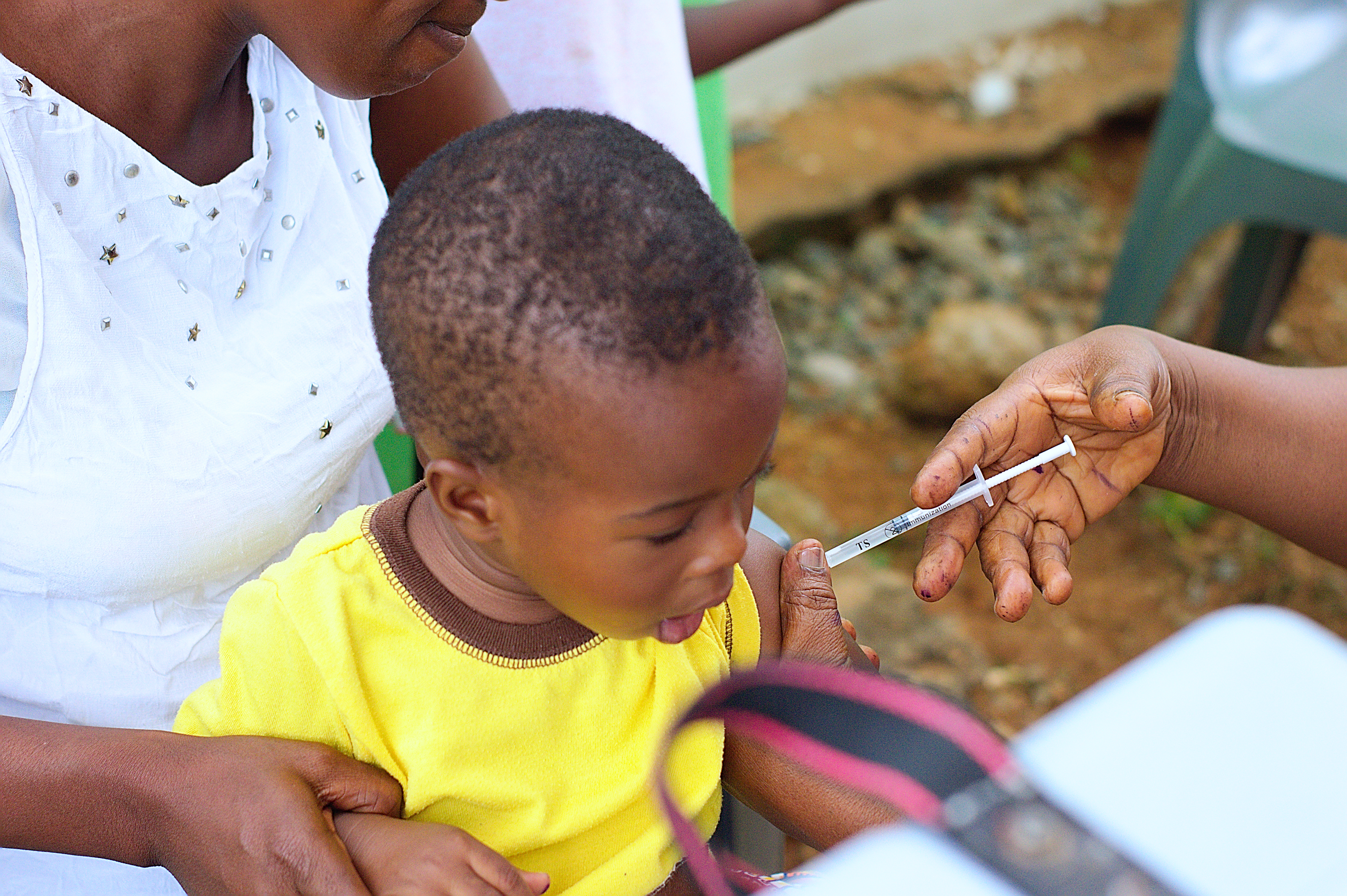
A child held while being vaccinated

Parents or medical doctors may make decision about the treatment of children, a principle known as parens patriae. In the United States, doctors are responsible for providing a good standard of care for patients who are children which can lead them to make decisions at odds with the parents wishes. Parents have less autonomy to make decisions about their children's care than adult patients have over their own care. Treatment may take place even if a child or adolescent disagree with treatment, though the wishes of a child patient are taken more into account the more burdensome treatment is and the worse the prognosis.

If a child does not assent to treatment they may be physically held while a procedure is carried out or anaesthesia is carried out. For some procedures, a child may be distracted to allow for treatment.

In Italy, court orders have been used to give children of Jehovah's Witnesses life-saving blood transfusion that were refused by their parents.

== Prevalence ==
There is a lot of variation in the rate of involuntary commitment between countries. A review in Europe in 2004 found a thirty-fold difference in the rate of psychiatric commitment between countries, with the median rate being 74 per hundred thousand people. It is estimated that 38% of people who are involuntarily committed experience another form of compulsion such as seclusion or forced medication.

== Effects ==
A 2014 Cochrane systematic review found that compulsory outpatient treatment of those with severe mental health disorders "results in no significant difference in service use, social functioning or quality of life compared with standard voluntary care." A 2006 review found that as many as 48% of respondents did not agree with their treatment, though a majority of people retrospectively agreed that involuntary medication had been in their best interest.

A review in 2011 looked at people's experience of coercion in mental health care. It found common themes of feeling violated, disrespected, and not being heard, commonly conceptualized as being dehumanized through isolation. A minority of narratives from people who had been treated involuntarily talked about the necessity of treatment in retrospect. (Note: See table 1 of: "The aspects of care leading to the experience of coercion were broad, but all involved the forcing of "treatment" onto patients against their will. The themes from these articles highlight feelings of violation, disrespect, and not being heard by their clinicians. The most common conceptualization was that of being dehumanized through a loss of normal human interaction and isolation. Using a wide range of thematic analyses, we found that these themes emerged in each article for a range of treatment interventions; this finding was robust. Positive themes were mentioned in three of the five articles from a minority of patients. These tended to emerge in retrospect, well after a patient's hospitalization, and focused on the need or rationale for treatment. These positive themes tended to reflect the social norms and explanations for compulsory care's leading to coercion, rather than the emotive or subjective responses elicited by such care.") Studies suggest that coercion in mental health care has a long-lasting psychological effect on individuals leading to reduced engagement and poorer social outcomes, but that this may be reduced by clinicians' knowledge of the effects of coercion.

== Ethics ==
In medical ethics, involuntary treatment is conceptualized as a form of parens patriae whereby the state takes on the responsibilities of incompetent adults on the basis of the duty to protect and the duty of beneficence (the duty of the state to repair the random harms of nature). The duty to protect is reflected in utilitarianism and communitarianism philosophy, though psychiatrist Paul Chodoff asserted a responsibility to "chasten" this responsibility in light of the political abuse of psychiatry in the Soviet Union. This duty to protect has been criticized on the grounds that psychiatrists are not effective at predicting violence, and tend to overestimate the risk.

The obligatory dangerousness criterion is a principle that has been applied to some mental health law that holds that parens patriae should only be applied if an individual is a danger to themselves or others.

Paul Ricœur distinguishes two forms of self, the idem, a short term experience of the self, and the ipse, a longer term persistent experience of the self. In mental illness, the autonomy of the ipse can be undermined by the autonomy of the idem, so involuntary mental health treatment can trade one form of autonomy for another.

== Sociology ==
Medical sociology seeks to understand the social processes underlying decisions made in medicine.

Sociologist Jeremy Dixon, speaking in the context of the United Kingdom, argues that assessment and monitoring of risk is a core part of mental health practice but that this risk is often in conflict with broadly defined goals of recovery including living a satisfying life. He argues that this focus on risk causes mental health professionals to make decisions defensively based on reputational damage if there were to be any inquiry and that multidisciplinary approaches are used for this purpose. He cites research showing how mental health professionals may seek to shift the burden of responsibility onto individuals themselves (noting different clinical decisions for those with personality disorders compared to those with psychotic disorders because they are viewed as more responsible for their behaviours), or shift responsibility onto other public health services. Risk assessments themselves are rarely shared with patients.

== Proponents and detractors ==
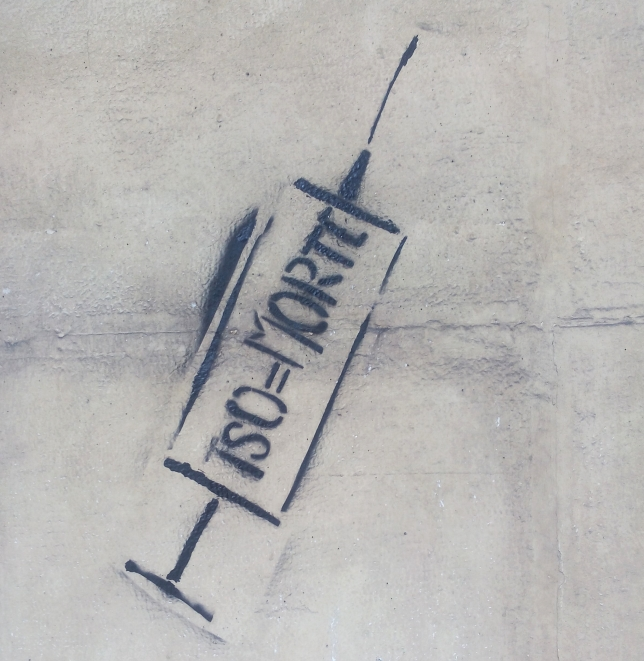
Protest graffiti against Involuntary treatment, Turin; TSO = MORTE means Involuntary treatment = Death

=== Proponents ===
Supporters of involuntary treatment include organizations such as the National Alliance on Mental Illness (NAMI), the American Psychiatric Association, and the Treatment Advocacy Center.

=== Detractors ===
A number of civil and human rights activists, anti-psychiatry groups, medical and academic organizations, researchers, and members of the psychiatric survivors movement vigorously oppose involuntary treatment on human rights grounds or on grounds of effectiveness and medical appropriateness, particularly with respect to involuntary administration of mind altering substances, ECT, and psychosurgery. Some criticism has been made regarding cost, as well as of conflicts of interest with the pharmaceutical industry. Critics, such as the New York Civil Liberties Union, have denounced the strong racial and socioeconomic biases in forced treatment orders.

Special rapporteurs of the United Nations (Catalina Devandas Aguilar and Dainius Puras) consider it as an infringement of the dignity of those subjected to it, with severe consequences for their physical and mental integrity and call on concerned states to put an end to respect individual's autonomy.

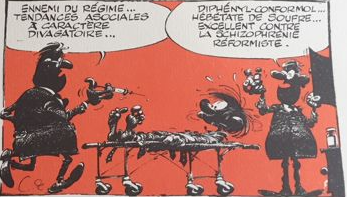
Part of André Franquin's poster for Amnesty International (1978)

Involuntary treatment is compared to torture on at least two special reports of the UN, one noting "forced psychiatric interventions, when committed against persons with psychosocial disabilities, satisfies both intent and purpose required under the article 1 of the Convention against Torture, notwithstanding claims of 'good intentions' by medical professionals." However, jurisdiction of some countries (e.g. France) requires intended harm (see: punitive psychiatry) to classify it as such and would classify involuntary treatment, rather as a degrading treatment, if recognize as it.

Amnesty International and Human Rights Watch oppose involuntary treatment.

== Laws internationally ==
=== United States ===
Mentally competent patients have a general right to refuse medical treatment.

All states in the U.S. allow for some form of involuntary treatment for mental illness or erratic behavior for short periods of time under emergency conditions, although criteria vary. Further involuntary treatment outside clear and pressing emergencies where there is asserted to be a threat to public safety usually requires a court order, and all states currently have some process in place to allow this. Since the late 1990s, a growing number of states have adopted Assisted Outpatient Commitment (AOC) laws.

Under assisted outpatient commitment, people committed involuntarily can live outside the psychiatric hospital, sometimes under strict conditions including reporting to mandatory psychiatric appointments, taking psychiatric drugs in the presence of a nursing team, and testing medication blood levels. Forty-five states presently allow for outpatient commitment.

In 1975, the U.S. Supreme Court ruled in O'Connor v. Donaldson that involuntary hospitalization and/or treatment violates an individual's civil rights. The individual must be exhibiting behavior that is a danger to themselves or others and a court order must be received for more than a short (e.g. 72-hour) detention. The treatment must take place in the least restrictive setting possible. This ruling has since been watered down through jurisprudence in some respects and strengthened in other respects. Long term "warehousing", through de-institutionalization, declined in the following years, though the number of people receiving involuntary treatment has increased more recently. The statutes vary somewhat from state to state.

In 1979, the United States Court of Appeals for the First Circuit established in Rogers v. Okin that a competent person committed to a psychiatric hospital has the right to refuse treatment in non-emergency situations. The case of Rennie v. Klein established that an involuntarily committed individual has a constitutional right to refuse psychotropic medication without a court order. Rogers v. Okin established the person's right to make treatment decisions so long as they are still presumed competent.

Additional U.S. Supreme Court decisions have added more restraints, and some expansions or effective sanctioning, to involuntary commitment and treatment. Foucha v. Louisiana established the unconstitutionality of the continued commitment of an insanity acquittee who was not suffering from a mental illness. In Jackson v. Indiana the court ruled that a person adjudicated incompetent could not be indefinitely committed. In Perry v. Louisiana the court struck down the forcible medication of a prisoner for the purposes of rendering him competent to be executed. In Riggins v. Nevada the court ruled that a defendant had the right to refuse psychiatric medication while he was on trial, given to mitigate his psychiatric symptoms. Sell v. United States imposed stringent limits on the right of a lower court to order the forcible administration of antipsychotic medication to a criminal defendant who had been determined to be incompetent to stand trial for the sole purpose of making them competent and able to be tried. In Washington v. Harper the Supreme Court upheld the involuntary medication of correctional facility inmates only under certain conditions as determined by established policy and procedures.

=== Europe ===
Country	During involuntary commitment	During outpatient commitment (community treatment order)
France	Yes	Yes
United Kingdom	Yes	Yes (after being recalled to hospital)
Germany	Yes	Yes
Switzerland		No in Geneva, not specified or yes for other cantons
Italy	Yes	Yes (7 days renewable)
Austria	(no neuroleptic depot injection)	(no neuroleptic depot injection)
Netherlands	Yes (law passed recently)	Yes (at home)
Ireland		no outpatient commitment
Sweden	Yes	Yes

== See also ==
=== Related concepts ===
- Coerced abstinence
- Political abuse of psychiatry (also known as "political psychiatry" and as "punitive psychiatry")
- Social control
- Specific jurisdictions' provisions for a temporary detention order for the purpose of mental-health evaluation and possible further voluntary or involuntary commitment:

- United States:

- California: 5150 (involuntary psychiatric hold) and Laura's Law (providing for court-ordered outpatient treatment)

- Lanterman–Petris–Short Act, codifying the conditions for and of involuntary commitment in California

- Florida: Baker Act and Marchman Act

=== Notable activists ===
- Giorgio Antonucci (elimination)
- Thomas Szasz (elimination)
- Robert Whitaker (reduction)
- E. Fuller Torrey (expansion)
- DJ Jaffe (expansion)

=== Advocacy organizations ===
- Mental Health America (reduction/modification)
- Mad in America (reduction/elimination)
- PsychRights (reduction/elimination)
- Anti-psychiatry, also known as the "anti-psychiatric movement" (reduction/elimination)
- Citizens Commission on Human Rights (reduction/elimination; founded as a joint effort of the anti-psychiatric Church of Scientology and libertarian mental-health-rights advocate Thomas Szasz)
- MindFreedom International (reduction/elimination)
- Treatment Advocacy Center (expansion)
- NAMI (expansion)
