= Voluntary commitment =

Choosing to admit oneself to a psychiatric hospital

Voluntary commitment is the act or practice of choosing to admit oneself to a psychiatric hospital, or other mental health facility. Unlike in involuntary commitment, the person is free to leave the hospital against medical advice, though there may be a requirement of a period of notice or that the leaving take place during daylight hours. In some jurisdictions, a distinction is drawn between formal and informal voluntary commitment, and this may have an effect on how much notice the individual must give before leaving the hospital. This period may be used for the hospital to use involuntary commitment procedures against the patient. People with mental illness can write psychiatric advance directives in which they can, in advance, consent to voluntary admission to a hospital and thus avoid involuntary commitment.

In the UK, people who are admitted to hospital voluntarily are referred to either as voluntary patients or informal patients. These people are free to discharge against medical advice, unless it is felt that they are at immediate risk, then a doctor can use mental health law to hold people in the hospital for up to 72 hours. People who are detained by mental health law are referred to as formal patients.

In Europe, the treatment of mental illness became a health policy priority under the impetus of the World Health Organization Mental Health Plan for Europe elaborated in 2005. This plan promoted a more effective balance between inpatient hospital care and outpatient care through the development of community mental healthcare services. Since the 1970s, the majority of European countries have shifted away from institutionalised care in large mental hospitals to the integration of patients in their living environment through the provision of home and community care services. Germany, England, France and Italy deinstitutionalized psychiatric care in the second half of the 20th century, but the speed and methods by which it was implemented varied, notably due to differences in social and political contexts. In Italy, the reform movement took place a little later. Until the 1968 Mariotti Law introducing voluntary internment, admission into a psychiatric hospital was only by compulsory commitment and was entered in an individual's criminal records.

== Coercion ==
In some countries, voluntary patients are able to choose to decline treatment, but service users may feel the need to comply with treatment to avoid formal commitment and remain in inpatient treatment and can experience informal coercion and some research suggests some voluntary patients are involuntarily forced to undergo treatment. Voluntary patients are often not familiar with their legal rights or aware of their status.
