= James Gottstein =

American lawyer

James Barry "Jim" Gottstein is a mostly retired Alaska based lawyer who practiced business law and public land law, and is well known as an attorney advocate for people diagnosed with serious mental illness. Gottstein has sought to check the growth in the administration of psychotropics, particularly to children.

Gottstein was instrumental making alternatives to psychiatric drugs available in Alaska, through organizations he founded or helped lead, including Soteria-Alaska and CHOICES, Inc.

In 2002, Gottstein co-founded the Law Project for Psychiatric Rights (PsychRights), and currently serves as its president. He is also a member of the board of directors of the International Center for the Study of Psychiatry and Psychology (ICSPP).

== Education and early career ==
Gottstein grew up in Anchorage, Alaska, and graduated in 1971 from West Anchorage High School. In 1974, he earned his bachelor of science degree, with honors in finance, from the University of Oregon, in Eugene, Oregon. Gottstein completed his legal studies in 1978, at Harvard Law School. After graduating from law school, Gottstein returned to Alaska, where he launched his legal career at the law firm of Robert M. Goldberg & Associates, which became Goldberg & Gottstein.

== Career ==
Gottstein practiced law independently from 1985, conducting business as the Law Offices of James B. Gottstein. Between 1986 and 1997, Gottstein represented Alaskans diagnosed with mental disorders in the Mental Health Trust Land Litigation, which resulted in a settlement valued at approximately $1 billion. State agencies in Alaska had misappropriated funds generated by a one million acre (4,000 km²) land trust, granted first for the necessary expenses of Alaska's mental health program.

From 1998 to 2004, he was a member of the Alaska Mental Health Board (AMHB), where he served as committee chair for the program evaluation and budget committees.

== PsychRights and advocacy ==
The Law Project for Psychiatric Rights, a.k.a. PsychRights, is a non-profit organization founded by Gottstein to mount a strategic litigation campaign against forced psychiatric drugging and electroshock. Its mission also includes exposing the truth about these drugs and the courts being misled into ordering people to be drugged and subjected to other brain and body damaging interventions against their will.

In furtherance of this mission PsychRights won five Alaska Supreme Court cases establishing that the state was violating people's rights and then lost one that undid much of the gains.

1. Myers v. Alaska Psychiatric Institute, ruling in 2006 that the state cannot constitutionally drug someone against their will unless it could prove it was in the person's best interest and there was no less intrusive alternative available.
2. Wetherhorn v. Alaska Psychiatric Institute, ruling in 2007 that the state cannot constitutionally confine someone for being mentally ill unless they cannot survive safely in freedom with the help of family and friends.
3. Wayne B. v. Alaska Psychiatric Institute, requiring in 2008 strict compliance with procedural protections before someone can be locked up and drugged against their will.
4. Bigley v. Alaska Psychiatric Institute, ruling in 2009 (a) that if a less intrusive alternative to forced drugging is feasible, the state must provide it or let the person go, (b) it was a denial of due process of law not to give the person's lawyer his medical records until the trial on locking him up and drugging him against his will, and (c) the petition to drug someone against their will must include must provide a plain, concise, and definite written statement of the facts underlying the petition, including the nature of and reasons for the proposed treatment, in order that the respondent may prepare to challenge the petition under the Myers factors. This should include information about the patient's symptoms and diagnosis; the medication to be used; the method of administration; the likely dosage; possible side effects, risks and expected benefits; and the risks and benefits of alter-native treatments and nontreatment.
5. In Re: Heather R., voiding and reversing in 2016 an order for an involuntary psychiatric evaluation because the Court did not try to interview Heather R. before issuing the order without notice.

Much of this progress was lost in 2019, when the Alaska Supreme Court decided In the Matter of: Linda M., holding the state could avoid the constitutional prohibition against locking someone up for being diagnosed as mentally ill and dangerous if there is a less restrictive alternative available by causing Soteria-Alaska to close due to insufficient funding, thereby making it unavailable.

PsychRights also developed the Medicaid Fraud Initiative Against Psychiatric Drugging of Children and Youth, based on the United States False Claims Act, also known as whistle-blower or Qui Tam cases, in which any person can file a suit on behalf of the government when improper requests for payment have been made to the federal government, and share in the recovery, if any. The ground for this is most psychiatric drugs prescribed to children and youth on Medicaid are not permissible under Medicaid. In United States rex rel Watson v. King-Vassel, the United States Court of Appeals for the Seventh Circuit held that doctors writing such prescriptions cause false claims.

In addition to co-founding PsychRights, Gottstein co-founded several organizations, including:

- The Alaska Mental Health Consumer Web (with Katsumi Kenaston), which provides peer-support and a drop in center for mental health consumers in Anchorage;
- CHOICES, Inc. (Consumers Having Ownership in Creating Effective Services), which provides peer-run, alternative services, especially the right to choose not to take psychiatric drugs;
- Mental Health Consumers of Alaska (with Andrea Schmook and Barbara Greene), for which he served as a board member for ten years;
- Peer Properties, Inc., which was strictly an owner and operator of real estate, provides peer (mental health consumer) run housing for people diagnosed with serious mental illness who are homeless, at risk of homelessness, or living in bad situations; and
- Soteria-Alaska, Inc., which was dedicated to providing a non-coercive and mainly non-drug alternative to psychiatric hospitalization, under the principles established by the late Dr. Loren Mosher.

== The Zyprexa Papers ==
In December 2006, during the course of litigation, Gottstein obtained internal documents of the pharmaceutical company Eli Lilly and Company, dated between 1995 and 2004, which showed that the company was aware that psychiatrists were reporting that many of their patients on the neuroleptic (antipsychotic) drug Zyprexa were developing high blood sugar or diabetes.

The memos also showed that Lilly had engaged in off-label marketing schemes, including one called "Viva Zyprexa" which encouraged primary care physicians to prescribe Zyprexa for conditions other than those for which the drug had been approved. United States federal law prohibits drug manufacturers from marketing prescription drugs for purposes other than those for which they have been approved, though individual medical practitioners have latitude to prescribe drugs to any patient they wish.

Gottstein obtained copies of the Eli Lilly memos from a doctor who had served as an expert witness in prior litigation involving Zyprexa, which had resulted in an out-of-court settlement of nearly $700 million with about 8,000 Zyprexa patients. At that time, Lilly succeeded in keeping the documents out of public view by obtaining protective orders to keep the documents under court seal and by requiring plaintiffs to sign confidentiality agreements in order to obtain out-of-court settlements.

However, upon realizing the magnitude of Lilly's off-label marketing effort, Gottstein took the information to the New York Times, which published several articles quoting from the documents. Gottstein further wrote to Lilly's attorneys requesting that the company issue a "Dear doctor" letter to "all health care providers in the United States advising them Zyprexa should not be prescribed to anyone who is not already taking it," noting however that the drug should not be withheld from patients who were currently using it because abrupt withdrawal could cause neuroleptic induced discontinuation syndrome. "It is now clear," Gottstein wrote, "that Zyprexa has no benefits over other neuroleptics, while causing far more cases of diabetes than do other drugs in its class.... This represents a massive health disaster including at least thousands of past and inevitable future deaths."

Eli Lilly responded to the articles in the New York Times by obtaining injunctions against Gottstein, the expert witness doctor from whom Gottstein had obtained the documents, and various advocacy groups, journalists, authors, doctors, and Internet websites to in order to bar them from further dissemination of information from the documents.

At the time of the disclosures, Zyprexa had become Lilly's top selling drug despite having been approved only to treat adults with schizophrenia or bipolar disorder. In 2005, Zyprexa sales amounted to $4.2 billion, thirty percent of the company's total revenues. At the time Lilly denied that links between Zyprexa and diabetes have ever been proven.

Between 2005 and 2007 Eli Lilly settled lawsuits by 28,500 people who took Zyprexa and developed diabetes or other metabolic diseases for approximately $1.2 billion. In March 2008, Lilly settled a suit with the state of Alaska, and in October 2008, Lilly agreed to pay $62 million to 32 states and the District of Columbia to settle suits brought under state consumer protection laws. In 2009, four sales representatives for Eli Lilly filed separate qui tam lawsuits against the company for illegally marketing Zyprexa for uses not approved by the Food and Drug Administration.

In early 2009, Eli Lilly paid $1.415 Billion to the United States Government in False Claims Act (whistleblower) lawsuits over its illegal marketing of Zyprexa. In January, 2020, Gottstein published a book titled The Zyprexa Papers giving his first-hand account of how he obtained the Zyprexa papers, including how Will Hall and a small group of psychiatric survivors untraceably spread the Zyprexa Papers on the Internet and his battles on behalf of Bill Bigley, the psychiatric patient whose ordeal made possible the exposure of the Zyprexa Papers.

20 million people worldwide had taken Zyprexa since its introduction in 1996.

== See also ==
- TeenScreen
- Anatomy of an Epidemic

== Literature ==
- Gottstein, James B. (2023). 'Fahrplan für den Wandel'. In Will Hall, Jenseits der Psychiatrie – Stimmen und Visionen des Wahnsinns im Madness Radio. Berlin & Lancaster: Peter Lehmann Publishing, pp. 271-273. ISBN 978-3-910546-23-3 (paperback), ISBN 978-3-910546-26-4 (e-book).
- Gottstein, James B. (2021). 'The prospect of recovering compensation for psychiatric withdrawal harm through litigation because of missing or misleading information'. In Peter Lehmann & Craig Newnes (Eds.), Withdrawal from Prescribed Psychotropic Drugs. Berlin / Lancaster: Peter Lehmann Publishing. ISBN 978-3-925931-83-3, ISBN 978-3-925931-84-0, ISBN 978-0-9545428-8-7.
- Gottstein, Jim (2020), 'The Zyprexa Papers,' Jim Gottstein, Anchorage, ISBN 978-0578627267 (paperback).
- Gottstein James (2018). Contributed chapter in Teaching Critical Psychology: International Perspectives, Craig Newnes and Laura Golding, Editors, Routledge. ISBN 978-1138288348 (paperback).
- Gottstein, James (2012). Contributed chapter in Drugging Our Children: How Profiteers Are Pushing Antipsychotics on Our Youngest, and What We Can Do to Stop It (Childhood in America series), Sharna Olfman and Brent Dean Robbins, editors, Praeger, ISBN 978-0313396830 (hardback).
- Gottstein, James (2010). 'Ethical and Moral Obligations Arising from Revelations of Pharmaceutical Company Dissembling,' Ethical and Human Psychology and Psychiatry, Vol. 12, No. 1: 22-29.
- Gottstein, James (2008). 'Involuntary Commitment and Forced Psychiatric Drugging In the Trial Courts: Rights Violations as a Matter of Course,' 25 Alaska Law Review 51 (2008).
- Gottstein, James B. (2007). 'Psychiatrists' Failure to Inform: Is There Substantial Financial Exposure?' Ethical Human Psychology and Psychiatry, Volume 9, Number 2.
- Gottstein, James B. (2007). 'Geld, Rechte und Alternativen. Einforderung gesetzlicher Rechte als Mittel zur Verbreitung von nichtmedizinischen Alternativen'. In Peter Lehmann & Peter Stastny (Eds.), Statt Psychiatrie 2 (pp. 321–331). Berlin / Eugene / Shrewsbury: Peter Lehmann Antipsychiatrieverlag. ISBN 978-3-925931-38-3. (E-Book 2018)
- Gottstein, James B. (2007). 'Money, Rights and Alternatives: Enforcing Legal Rights as a Mechanism for Creating Non-medical Model Alternatives'. In Peter Stastny & Peter Lehmann (Eds.), Alternatives Beyond Psychiatry (pp. 308–317). Berlin / Eugene / Shrewsbury: Peter Lehmann Publishing. ISBN 978-0-9545428-1-8 (UK), ISBN 978-0-9788399-1-8 (USA). (E-Book 2018).
- Gottstein James B. (2006/2007). Why Clients Should Not Take Psychotherapists into Their Confidence, ISPS-US Newsletter: Winter, 2006/2007, Volume 7, Issue 3.
- Goodman, Seymour E., Gottstein, James B., Goodman, Diane S. (2001). 'Wiring the Wilderness in Alaska and the Yukon, Commun.' ACM 44, 6 (June 2001), 21–26.
