= Riggins v. Nevada =

- Supreme Court of the United States

Argued January 15, 1992 Decided May 18, 1992
- Full case name: Riggins v. Nevada
- Citations: 504 U.S. 127 (more) 112 S. Ct. 1810; 118 L. Ed. 2d 479

Case history
- Prior: Riggins v. State, 107 Nev. 178, 808 P.2d 535 (1991)

Holding
- The forcible medication of the petitioner on trial violated his rights guaranteed by the Sixth and Fourteenth Amendments.

Court membership
- Chief Justice William Rehnquist Associate Justices Byron White · Harry Blackmun; John P. Stevens · Sandra Day O'Connor; Antonin Scalia · Anthony Kennedy; David Souter · Clarence Thomas

Case opinions
- Majority: O'Connor, joined by Rehnquist, White, Blackmun, Stevens, Souter
- Concurrence: Kennedy (in judgment)
- Dissent: Thomas, joined by Scalia (except as to Part II–A)

Laws applied
- U.S. Const. amends. VI, XIV

Riggins v. Nevada, 504 U.S. 127 (1992), is a U.S. Supreme Court case in which the court decided whether a mentally ill person can be forced to take antipsychotic medication while they are on trial to allow the state to make sure they remain competent during the trial.

== Background ==
During the early hours of November 20, 1987, David Riggins went to the Nevada apartment of Paul Wade, who was later found stabbed to death with wounds to the head, chest, and back. Approximately two days later, Riggins was arrested for the capital murder and robbery of Wade. After his arrest he complained of hearing voices and sleeplessness, telling the jail psychiatrist that he had taken Mellaril in the past. The psychiatrist prescribed him increasing doses of Mellaril at Riggins' request, until Riggins was taking 800 milligrams a day, considered a very high dose of that medication. Riggins was also prescribed Dilantin, which further inhibited his capabilities to appear in trial. Despite remarks doubting this dosage, it was assumed that the judgment was medically sound and accurate to Riggins' condition, as described by his psychiatrist, Dr. R. Edward Quass.

Riggins was evaluated and found competent to stand trial, with one of the three evaluating psychiatrists dissenting. Riggins stated he planned to present an insanity defense and requested that the Mellaril be discontinued until after the trial so that the jury would see his mental state first hand rather than be given a false impression induced by the medication, which would deny him due process. Riggins did not intend to be made unfit for trial. The court heard testimony from three psychiatrists with differing opinions and then gave a one-page decision denying Riggins' request. Justice O'Connor is quoted saying that she believed Riggins had to be required to continue the medication for the safety of both himself and the court.

At trial, Riggins presented an insanity defense and testified on his own behalf. He indicated that, on the night of Wade's death, he used cocaine before going to Wade's apartment. Riggins admitted fighting with Wade, but claimed that Wade was trying to kill him and that voices in his head said that killing Wade would be justifiable homicide. A jury found Riggins guilty of murder with use of a deadly weapon and robbery with use of a deadly weapon. After a penalty hearing, the same jury sentenced him to death.

Throughout the trial, Riggins had insisted upon participation in the trial without the medication he was administered, but the courts told him he had to take the medication in order to appear. Riggins argued that this was infringing upon his due process and that he was not in the proper mental state to appear while he was under the effects of the medication.

=== Appeals ===
Riggins appealed to the Nevada Supreme Court on the grounds that forced administration of Mellaril denied him the ability to assist in his own defense and gave a false impression of his attitude, appearance, and demeanor at trial. Riggins claimed that the forced medication was not justified, as the State had not demonstrated a need to administer Mellaril nor did it explore less restrictive alternatives to giving him 800 milligrams of the drug each day. Riggins also claimed that the court's forcing of his medication was an instance of prejudice, which the courts determined was not the case. However, the Nevada Supreme Court affirmed Riggins' convictions and death sentence. Riggins then petitioned the U.S. Supreme Court.

== Opinion of the Court ==
The Supreme Court reversed and remanded, holding that forced administration of antipsychotic medication during Riggins' trial violated his rights guaranteed under the Sixth and Fourteenth Amendments. A seven-member majority held that the state did not show that antipsychotic medication was medically appropriate and did not demonstrate that it considered less intrusive means in obtaining its goal of trying Riggins.

The Court stated that Riggins' Eighth Amendment argument that the forcible administration of antipsychotic medication denied him the chance to show the jury his true mental state at the sentencing hearing was not raised in the petition for certiorari and therefore was not addressed by the court.

The Court held that a person awaiting trial has a valid reason, protected under the due process clause, to refuse antipsychotic drugs, referencing Washington v. Harper (1990) and Bell v. Wolfish (1979). Therefore, once Riggins' requested termination of the medication, the State was obligated to establish both the need for the antipsychotic drug and its medical appropriateness for Riggins' safety and that of others as the less restrictive alternative available. If the state had done this, due process would have been satisfied. The State might have been able to justify the treatment, if medically appropriate, if it set forth that the adjudication of guilt or innocence could not be established by using less intrusive means. Since the trial court did not do this and allowed the drug's administration to continue without making any of the determinations stated above, it is very likely that this error violated Riggins' trial rights established by the Constitution. However, this is only speculative as there is no way to know what the outcome would have been if the proper course had been followed.

Riggins would ultimately have his conviction reversed due to the violation of his Sixth and Fourteenth Amendment rights, and would not receive the death penalty.

== Significance ==
This decision highlighted two factors not previously emphasized in cases involving involuntary medication. First, the involuntary treatment must be the least intrusive treatment for restoration of competence. Second, the proposed treatment must be medically appropriate for the individual's safety as well as that of others.

In Washington v. Harper, the individual protesting the involuntary medication was already incarcerated. The Court suggested in this case that a competent person has the right to refuse if the medication is administered for other than treatment reasons to a person not dangerous or extremely ill, but it accepted the institution's procedures for making such treatment decisions. However, Riggins was not convicted at the time he was involuntarily medicated. In Riggins v. Nevada, the Court said that not only had the medication to be a medically appropriate means of attaining an important state objective such as competency, but the medication must be the least intrusive means of attaining the objective. However, although the treatment must be the least intrusive (for example, to allow the individual to retain a clear head to consult with his attorney as well as to avoid medication side effects), the court did not say that involuntary medication is never appropriate to achieve the state's goal.

Limits about drug dosages in trial were eventually settled in Sell v. United States, over a decade after the Riggins v. Nevada decision.

== See also ==
- List of United States Supreme Court cases, volume 504
- List of United States Supreme Court cases
- Lists of United States Supreme Court cases by volume
- List of United States Supreme Court cases by the Rehnquist Court
- Sell v. United States
- Perry v. Louisiana
- Ford v. Wainwright
- Washington v. Harper
