= Coercion =

Forcing involuntary behavior in another

Coercion involves compelling a party to act in an involuntary manner through the use of threats, including threats to use force against that party. It involves a set of forceful actions which violate the free will of an individual in order to induce a desired response. These actions may include extortion, blackmail, or even torture and sexual assault. Common-law systems recognize duress as a defense to criminal liability when an individual commits an offense under coercion.

Coercion used as leverage may force victims to act in a way contrary to their own interests. Coercion can involve not only the infliction of bodily harm but also psychological abuse (the latter intended to enhance the perceived credibility of the threat). The threat of further harm may also lead to the acquiescence of the person being coerced. Although the concepts of coercion and persuasion are similar, various factors distinguish the two. These include the intent, the willingness to cause harm, the result of the interaction, and the options available to the coerced party.

== Contexts ==
=== Political theory ===
Political authors such as John Rawls, Thomas Nagel, and Ronald Dworkin consider whether governments are inherently coercive. In 1919, Max Weber, building on the view of Rudolf von Ihering, defined a state as "a human community that (successfully) claims a monopoly on the legitimate use of physical force". Morris argues that the state can operate through incentives rather than coercion.

=== Healthcare ===
Healthcare systems may use informal coercion to make a patient adhere to a doctor's treatment plan. Under certain circumstances, medical staff may use physical coercion to treat a patient involuntarily, a practice which raises ethical concerns. Such practices has also been shown to cause moral distress among healthcare staff, especially when staff attitudes toward coercive measures are negative. To minimize the need for coercion in psychiatric care, various models like Safewards, as well as Six Core Strategies, have been implemented with promising results.

== Overview ==
The purpose of coercion is to substitute one's aims with weaker ones that the aggressor wants the victim to have. For this reason, many social philosophers have considered coercion as the polar opposite to freedom. Various forms of coercion are distinguished: first on the basis of the kind of injury threatened, second according to its aims and scope, and finally according to its effects, from which its legal, social, and ethical implications mostly depend.

=== Physical ===
Physical coercion is the most commonly considered form of coercion, where the content of the conditional threat is the use of force against a victim, their relatives or property. An often used example is "putting a gun to someone's head" (at gunpoint) or putting a "knife under the throat" (at knifepoint or cut-throat) to compel action under the threat that non-compliance may result in the attacker harming or even killing the victim. These are so common that they are also used as metaphors for other forms of coercion.

Armed forces in many countries use firing squads to maintain discipline and intimidate the masses, or opposition, into submission or silent compliance. However, there also are nonphysical forms of coercion, where the threatened injury does not immediately imply the use of force. In 2000, Byman and Waxman defined coercion as "the use of threatened force, including the limited use of actual force to back up the threat, to induce an adversary to behave differently than it otherwise would". Coercion does not in many cases amount to destruction of property or life since compliance is the goal.

==== Use of force ====
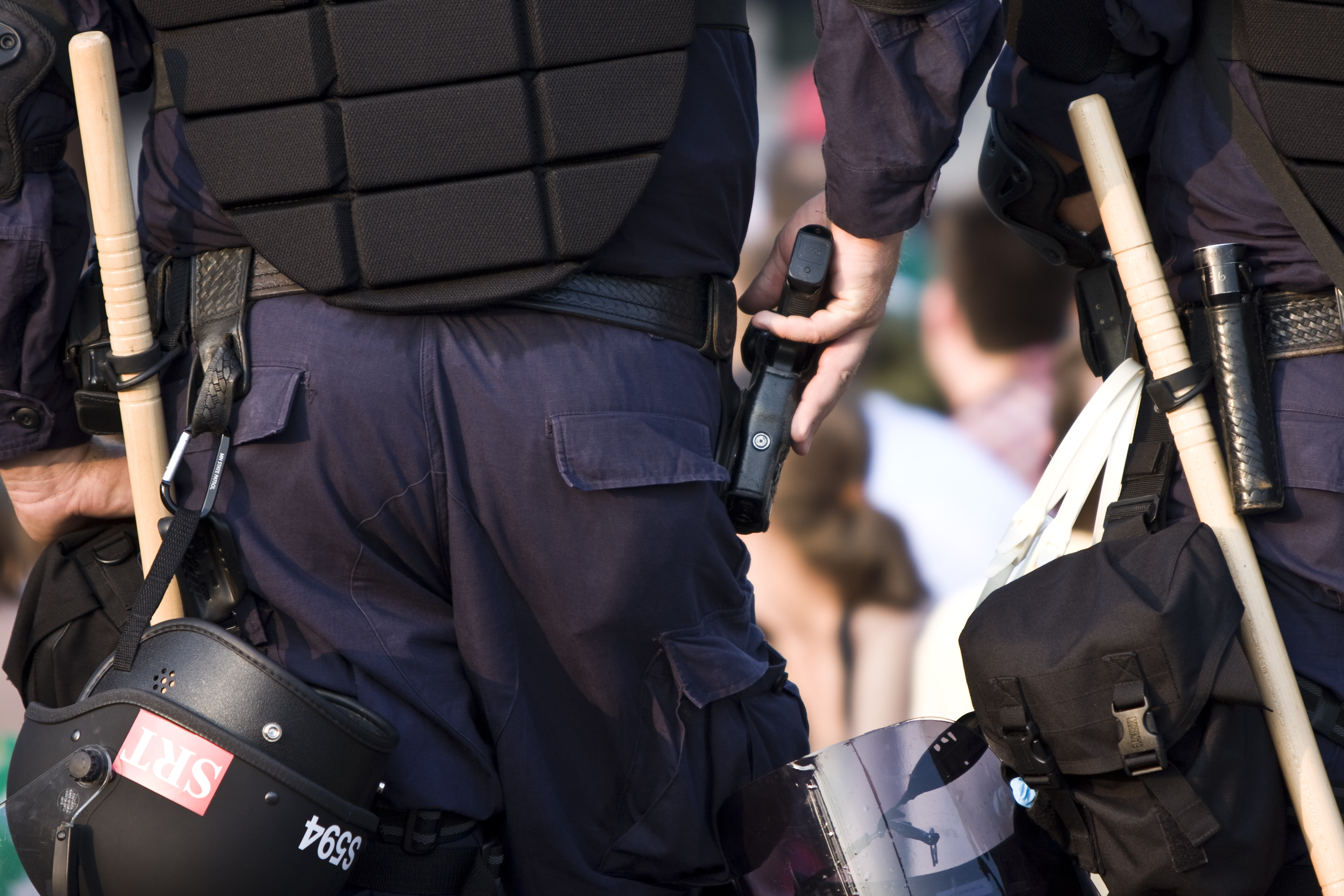
A St. Paul Police SRT indexing a handgun in a gun holster

The use of force, in the context of law enforcement, may be defined as "the amount of effort required by police to compel compliance by an unwilling subject." Multiple definitions exist according to context and purpose. In practical terms, use of force amounts to any combination of threatened or actual force used for a lawful purpose, e.g. to effect arrest; defend oneself or another person; or to interrupt a crime in progress or prevent an imminent crime. Depending on the jurisdiction, legal rights of this nature might be recognized to varying degrees for both police officers and non-sworn individuals; and may be accessible regardless of citizenship. Canada's Criminal Code, for example, provides in section 494 for arrest in certain circumstances by "any one."

Use of force doctrines can be employed by law enforcement officers and military personnel, who are on guard duty. The aim of such doctrines is to balance the needs of security with ethical concerns for the rights and well-being of intruders or suspects. Injuries to civilians tend to focus attention on self-defense as a justification and in the event of death, the notion of justifiable homicide.

Police use physical force to the extent necessary to secure observance of the law or to restore order only when the exercise of persuasion, advice and warning is found to be insufficient.

— Sir Robert Peel, "Principles of Law Enforcement"

For the English law on the use of force in crime prevention, see Self-defence in English law. The Australian position on the use of troops for civil policing is set out by Michael Head in Calling Out the Troops: Disturbing Trends and Unanswered Questions; compare "Use of Deadly Force by the South African Police Services Re-visited" by Malebo Keebine-Sibanda and Omphemetse Sibanda.

==== Pain compliance ====
Pain compliance is the use of painful stimulus to control or direct a person. The purpose of pain compliance is to direct the actions of the subject, and to this end, the pain is lessened or removed when compliance is achieved. This provides incentive to the subject to carry out the action required. The stimulus can be manual through brute force and placing pressure on pain-sensitive areas on the body. Painful hyperextension or hyperflexion on joints is also used. Tools such as a whip or a baton (capable of inflicting blunt trauma), an electroshock weapon, or chemicals such as tear gas or pepper spray are commonly used as well.

== See also ==
- Acquiescence
- Brainwashing
- Coercive diplomacy
- Coercive power
- Controlling behavior in relationships
- Deterrence (legal)
- Duress in American law
- Duress in English law
- Marital coercion
- Monopoly on violence
- Punishment (psychology)
- Undue influence
