= Obligatory Dangerousness Criterion =

Principle in mental health law

The obligatory dangerousness criterion is a principle present in the mental health law of many developed countries. It mandates evidence of dangerousness to oneself or to others before involuntary treatment for mental illness. The term "dangerousness" refers to one's ability to hurt oneself or others physically or mentally within an imminent time frame, and the harm caused must have a long-term effect on the person(s).

Psychiatric hospitals and involuntary commitment have been around for hundreds and even thousands of years around the world, but the obligatory dangerousness criterion was created in the United States in the 1900s. The criterion is a controversial topic, with opponents claiming that it is unethical and potentially harmful. Supporters claim that the criterion is necessary to protect the mentally ill and those impacted by their involuntary treatment.

== Background ==
If a court determines that a person may cause long-term harm to themselves or others, then the person can be hospitalized or be required to outpatient treatment and treated involuntarily. In order to be released, the court must determine whether the person is no longer dangerous. The length of time that a person is involuntarily hospitalized varies and is determined by the state.

An obligatory dangerousness criterion has two main parts. First is the Latin phrase parens patriae, which translates to "parent of his or her nation", which "assigns to the government a responsibility to intervene on behalf of citizens who cannot act in their own best interest". The second part "requires a state to protect the interests of its citizens", meaning that the government must do what it can to care for greater society, which may involve limiting one individual's rights to avoid harming the greater society.

== History ==
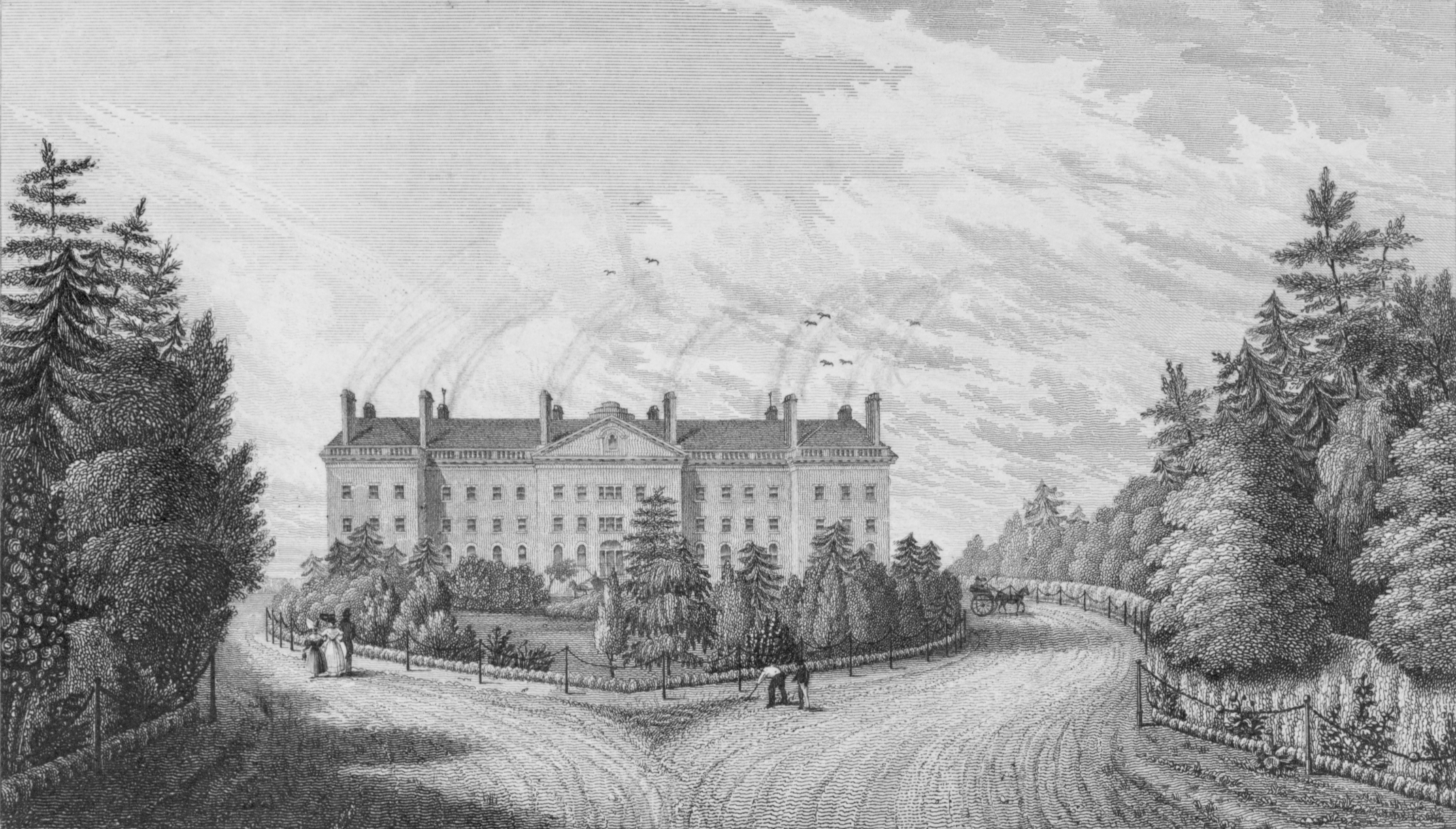
Founded in 1816 in Manhattan, New York, Bloomingdale Insane Asylum was one of the earlier psychiatric hospitals established in the United States.

Psychiatric asylums and guardianship over the mentally ill have been present for centuries. In Greece, individuals, such as Hippocrates, believed that those with mental illnesses should be separated from others and maintained within a safe, healthy environment. Ancient Rome allowed guardianship over mentally ill individuals. In the US, psychiatric hospitals were not established until the late 18th and early 19th centuries. Before their establishment, individuals suffering with mental illnesses were imprisoned or kept from society. After their establishment, anyone could be admitted to a psychiatric hospital if a family member brought them and a physician agreed to provide a treatment. Individuals could be at the hospital indefinitely until a court ruled they could be released.

An obligatory dangerousness criterion was officially established in the United States in 1964 by the Ervin Act in Washington, D.C. It provided a more lenient interpretation of "dangerousness" as well as alternatives to involuntary hospitalization. It is meant to protect individuals with mental health disorders on the basis of parens patria. In order to be involuntary hospitalized under the obligatory dangerousness criterion, one must have a mental illness, and most states also require that the individual is in need of medical treatment for the illness.

In 1964, Washington, D.C., established that an individual may only be involuntarily hospitalized if the individual has a mental illness, may be threat to others or their self in the near future, or is unable to survive on their own. States followed suit and began implementing a dangerousness criteria, as well. In the 1975 Supreme Court case O'Connor v. Donaldson, the Supreme Court ruled that the individual must have a mental illness, pose a known threat to the safety of their self or others, be unable to care for themselves, or need psychiatric care. States adjusted their rules so that a patient's involuntary hospitalization would be re-evaluated over the span of a short period of time, ranging from two days to two weeks before a patient could have a court hearing to potentially be released.

== Controversy ==
The obligatory dangerousness criterion is controversial. Supporters claim that the criterion is necessary in order to ensure that those who are in vital need of psychiatric care will receive it, and to prevent the mentally ill individual from potentially harming themselves or others. They also note that mental health disorders can impair one's judgement, for example, if an individual with depression does not think that they need help. They argue that psychiatric care often involves some form of hospitalization or treatment, and as a result, "involuntary hospitalization, or civil commitment, has been a mainstay of psychiatric care" since the field first began. Some individuals who have been involuntarily hospitalized perceived their experience to be beneficial and fair. Lastly, they also note how many states require that the least invasive measures be taken before involuntary hospitalization is considered.

Its opponents claim that an obligatory dangerousness criterion is unethical. Some believe it denies the individual of consent, is discriminatory based on mental health, and may increase the patient's risk of suicide, psychotic symptoms, or other harmful behaviors. They worry an obligatory dangerousness criterion might lead individuals without a serious mental illness to be involuntarily hospitalized, or that individuals without a serious mental illness will be involuntarily hospitalized as a "preventative" means. Those who oppose an obligatory dangerousness criterion also argue that there are less restrictive alternatives to involuntary hospitalization that can help those with a mental illness.

== See also ==
- Deinstitutionalisation
- Duty to protect
- Recidivism
