= Informal coercion =

Informal health service

In the context of a doctor–patient relationship, informal coercion is a social process where a healthcare profession tries to make a patient adhere to the healthcare system's desired treatment without making use of formal coercion such as involuntary commitment combined with involuntary treatment. An example of involuntary treatment in mental health care is intramuscular injection with the antipsychotic haloperidol.

Informal coercion is often applied by health professionals as part of mental health treatment but is also used by friends and family of a service user.

== Classification ==
Several hierarchies of informal coercion have been created. Smuzkler and Appelbaum defined a five-level hierarchy of coercion:

1. persuasion
2. interpersonal leverage
3. inducements
4. threats
5. compulsory treatment.

Lidz et al. define nine forms of informal coercion:

1. persuasion
2. inducement
3. threats
4. show of force
5. physical force
6. legal force
7. request for a dispositional preference
8. giving orders
9. deception.

=== Interpersonal leverage ===
If the service user has an emotional dependency on the service provider then the clinician can use displays of disappointment to influence the service user.

=== Inducements ===
The patient may be demanded to do what a clinician wants to secure access to goods of monetary value such as housing, money, children, and criminal justice. Conditional access to housing is the most common form of inducement in informal coercion, being report by 15–40% of service users. A study of informal coercion in housing provision found that 60% of noncompliant service users were excluded from the program. Healthcare worker may use inducements such as cigarettes, drinks, or a walk to persuade patients to take medication.

=== Threats ===
The threat of involuntary commitment or involuntary treatment of treatment may be used to convince patients to comply without using formal coercion.

== Prevalence ==
Studies show that most mental health professionals use informal coercion daily in routine practice. Practitioners use informal coercion more than they are aware, and a study showed it is underestimated. 29–59% of service users report informal coercion, according to studies spanning different regions. Judicial leverage, where a service user complies to treatment to avoid legal proceedings, was reported by 11–23% of service users.

== Attitudes ==
55–69% of service users said they perceived interpersonal leverage as fair and 48–60% as effective. Studies show that patients with higher levels of insight were more favourable to coercion. Patients diagnosed with schizophrenia are more likely to say that informal coercion is taking place, and are more negative about its use.

Service providers, such as mental health nurses or psychiatrists, consider informal coercion as a means to promote compliance, which they felt could prevent worsening of symptoms and the need for formal coercion. Professionals felt that informal coercion could encourage individuals to take more agency over their lives.

In a focus group with international mental health care workers, workers were found to consider informal coercion effective, but were uneasy about its use. Healthcare workers felt informal coercion was more acceptable in cases of mania or acute psychosis. There was a degree of cognitive dissonance surrounding the practice, healthcare workers described behaviour matching formal definitions of informal coercion, but were reluctant to label their behaviour as coercive.
