= Casey's Law =

Casey's Law, officially known as the Matthew Casey Wethington Act for Substance Abuse Intervention, is a Kentucky state law enacted in 2004 that allows the involuntary commitment of individuals for substance use disorder treatment through a civil court process. The law was named in memory of Matthew Casey Wethington, a young man who died of a heroin overdose in 2002. Similar versions of the law have been adopted in other U.S. states, including Ohio.

== Background ==
Matthew Casey Wethington was a 23-year-old Kentucky resident who died from a heroin overdose in August 2002. His parents, unable to compel him into treatment due to limitations in Kentucky law at the time, became advocates for legal reform. In response, the Kentucky General Assembly passed legislation enabling family members to petition for court-ordered addiction treatment, even if the individual had not committed a crime.

The law was named in his honor and became known as "Casey's Law."

== Provisions ==
Casey's Law allows parents, relatives, or friends to petition a court to order involuntary treatment for an individual struggling with substance use disorder. The petitioner must submit evidence that:

- The individual suffers from alcohol or drug addiction;
- The individual is a danger to themselves or others;
- Treatment is likely to benefit the individual.

If the petition meets the statutory requirements, the court may order evaluations by two qualified health professionals—one of whom must be a physician. A hearing is then held to determine whether involuntary treatment is justified.

Treatment can range from 60 to 360 days and may occur on an outpatient or inpatient basis. The cost of treatment is typically the responsibility of the petitioner unless the individual qualifies for public assistance.

== Expansion to other states ==
In 2012, Ohio enacted a version of Casey's Law, codified as the Ohio Revised Code Chapter 5119.94 (also known as the "Substance Use Civil Commitment Law").

Other states, including Indiana, Pennsylvania, and West Virginia, have considered similar legislation, often citing the opioid crisis and the success of Kentucky's model.

== Legal and ethical issues ==
The law has drawn support from families of individuals struggling with addiction, who see it as a potentially life-saving intervention. However, it has also faced criticism on legal and ethical grounds:

- Civil liberties advocates argue that involuntary treatment may infringe on due process rights.
- Critics note that coerced treatment can be less effective and may strain limited treatment resources.
- The financial burden placed on petitioners is also a barrier, as treatment costs can be substantial and are often not covered by insurance.

Despite these concerns, proponents argue that Casey's Law offers a vital tool for intervention in cases where individuals are incapable of seeking help on their own.

== Use and impact ==
As of 2022, more than 6,000 Casey's Law petitions had been filed in Kentucky alone. A 2016 study conducted by the Kentucky Administrative Office of the Courts found that most petitions resulted in treatment orders and that families reported the process as emotionally difficult but potentially life-saving.

The law has been cited in media coverage and addiction policy debates as an example of innovative civil intervention, especially during the opioid epidemic in the United States.

== See also ==
- Involuntary commitment
- Drug policy of the United States
- Substance use disorder
- Opioid epidemic in the United States
