= Covert medication =

Disguised administration of medicines

Covert medication practices are the administration of medicines in a disguised form, usually in food or drink, to a patient without their knowledge or consent. The decision-making processes surrounding covert medication should be in the best interests of the patient; medications that are not contributing to positive health outcomes should not be administered.

Research suggests that covert administration of drugs is an embedded practice in nursing homes for the elderly in New Zealand. 43-71% of nursings homes in the United Kingdom acknowledge the practice.

== Forms ==
Medication is sometimes administered covertly by crushing pills and adding them to food or drink.

Covert administration of medication is practised in a range of medical specialities and across a variety of care settings including psychiatry, paediatrics, geriatric medicine and care homes. In the care of paediatric patients, young children may be unwilling to take medication with an unpleasant taste or smell, or due to fear of the unfamiliar. In these cases, the medication may be mixed with food or drink to make it more acceptable.

In dementia, patients experience memory loss and can have impaired decision-making skills. As a result, their capacity to consent to medication is impaired. In these cases medication may be covertly administered, as is the case in nursing homes. Impaired capacity is also seen in patients with intellectual disability. These patients may exhibit behaviours that challenge or symptoms of mental ill health, for which medication is used to reduce risk of harm to self or others. The best interest of the patient are considered when making decisions. Patients with mental health disorders, such as schizophrenia or bipolar affective disorder, may lack insight into their mental health symptoms. They refuse medication due to the belief it is not needed.

== Safety ==
Covert administration of medication typically involves mixing the medication with food or drink. This can have an impact on the absorption of the drug. Absorption of some medicines, such as antibiotics, can be reduced when mixed with food, particularly dairy products. Some medicines are incompatible with various minerals including calcium, iron, magnesium, and zinc, all of which may reduce absorption. Crushing slow-releasing tablets or enteric coated medicines may also reduce absorption of the medicines.

Mixing medications with food or drink may also affect the metabolism of the drug. For example, grapefruit juice changes the bioavailability of many medicines by decreasing the rate of elimination. This alters drug levels in the blood which may cause side effects or make the drug less effective.

== Decision-making ==
In the UK guidelines state that individuals should be medicated covertly for as short a period of time as possible and their medication should be reviewed regularly, with decision making documented. In New Zealand there is not any guidance on decision making surrounding covert medication for nurses. There is no legislative guidance in Ontario in Canada for deception in healthcare.

In the UK, NHS trusts may publish guidelines concerning administration of covert medication. Guidelines often include flowcharts to aid decision making. NICE recommends care home providers have a care home medicines policy that includes guidance on covert administration of medications by care home staff.

Nursing guidelines in the New Zealand state the overriding a patient's wishes to not receive medication if the healthcare worker perceives it to be in the patient's best interest. In the United Kingdom, only patients who have been deemed to lack mental capacity can be covertly medicated; capacity may be assessed by the prescriber of the medication.

In some facilities in New Zealand, it is standard practice for nurses to ask a pharmacist before crushing medication.

== Legal status ==
It can be inferred from the Universal Declaration of Human Rights that all persons have the right to refuse medication, and this right is often enshrined in national law. In some situations, patients may lack capacity to make decisions about accepting or refusing medication. In these situations, it may be appropriate to covertly administer medication, after other measures have been attempted.

Medication is only likely to be administered covertly where:

- The patient actively refuses their medicine
- It is determined to be essential to the patient's mental or physical health, and therefore in their best interest
- The patient is deemed to lack capacity to understand the repercussions of refusing the medication.

=== United Kingdom ===
The Human Rights Act, part of UK law, incorporates the European Convention of Human Rights and has several implications for mental health patients. Relevant articles concerning mental health and covert medicine administration in the Human Rights Act are listed below:

Article 3

"No one shall be subjected to torture or to inhumane or degrading treatment or punishment"

Article 5

"Right to liberty and security"

5(1) "Everyone has the right to liberty and security of person save ... (e)the lawful detention...of persons of unsound mind..."

5(2) "Everyone who is arrested shall be informed promptly, in a language which he understands, of the reasons for his arrest..."

5(4) "Everyone who is deprived of his liberty...shall be entitled to take proceedings by which the lawfulness of his detention shall be decided speedily by a court and his release ordered if the detention is not lawful."

Article 8

"Right to respect for private and family life"

The Mental Health Act is an Act passed through Parliament in the United Kingdom which applies to people in England and Wales. In specific circumstances, this overrides certain fundamental human rights mentioned above. For example, those with mental health problems can be sectioned under the Mental Health Act to be kept in hospital, possibly against their wishes, particularly if they are at risk of harm to themselves, harm to others and harm from others. The Mental Health Act is limited to treatments of a patient's mental health. Under the Mental Health Act, it is not appropriate to give medicines covertly to treat physical health, only mental health.

Generally, to receive any kind of health treatment, you need to give consent. In England and Wales, the Mental Capacity Act 2005 sets out legislation criteria and procedure for patients who do not have the capacity to make decisions for themselves. In this situation, a management plan is agreed in the best interests of the patient. This involves a meeting with healthcare professionals, care home staff and an independent reviewer, such as a family member, friend or independent mental capacity advocate.Capacity should be assessed each time a new medical decision is made, as the ability to give valid consent can fluctuate, particularly in those with mental health disorders.

Covert administration is only necessary and appropriate where:

- A person actively refuses a medicine.
- It is safe to do so
- The medication is deemed essential to their health and wellbeing.
- The person is judged not to have the capacity to understand the consequences of their refusal, determined by the Mental Capacity Act 2005.

The Mental Capacity Act applies to the administration of medication and treatment for any condition covertly. This is in contrast to the Mental Health Act, which applies to mental health, as above.

== Ethics ==
Guidry-Grimes, Dean and Victor theorize that covert medication may damage relationships and as a result an individual's identity that may depend on these relationships, particular if medication is covertly added to food since food, its production and its mutual consumption can be an element of relationships.

Regarding covert medication within families, Guidry-Grimes, Dean and Victor argue that covert medication by a family member may cause more relational damage and represent a greater violation of trust. They argue that the lack of healthcare services, such as in India, may contribute to covert medication by family members. Responding, Pickering argues that certain cultures may be more collectivist and less individualistic than others with the family acting as a form of collective which could reduce the sense of violation if a family member engages in covert medication towards another family member.
