= Acute behavioural disturbance =

Conditions of medical emergency

Acute behavioral disturbance (ABD) is an umbrella term referring to various conditions of medical emergency where a person behaves in a manner that may put themselves or others at risk. It is not a formal diagnosis. Another controversial term, the widely rejected idea of excited delirium, is sometimes used interchangeably with ABD (although according to definitions adopted by the Faculty of Forensic and Legal Medicine of the Royal College of Physicians in England, "only about one-third of cases of ABD present as excited delirium").

According to the Faculty of Forensic and Legal Medicine, ABD can be caused by a number of conditions including psychosis (potentially due to bipolar disorder or schizophrenia), substance abuse, hypoglycemia, akathisia, hypoxia, head injury as well as other conditions.

Treatment generally consists of verbal deescalation, voluntary sedation with antipsychotics or benzodiazepine, or involuntary treatment with antipsychotics, benzodiazepines or ketamine through intramuscular injection as a means of chemical restraint through rapid tranquilization possibly combined with physical restraint.

== Treatment in a medical setting ==
The initial treatment is through verbal descalation through encouraging patient to go to an area to avoid arousal, avoidance of confrontational body language or tone of voice. If this is not effective, chemical and physical restraint are used. Internationally, there is some difference in the guidelines for chemical restraint; some guidelines suggest that sedatives should be used alone initially, while others suggest that antipsychotics alone should be used initially.

The UK's National Health Service has produced guidelines for handling violence and the risk of violence in psychiatric and emergency departments. When using physical restraint, National Institute for Health and Care Excellence suggest supine rather than prone restraint and that physical restraint should ideally not last longer than 10 minutes.

In Australia, so-called behavioural assessment rooms are provided in emergency rooms where an aggressive patient can be moved to. These rooms are alarmed, allow for a patient to be observed from outside, are hidden from the rest of the emergency ward, and are acoustically conditioned to prevent others in the ward from hearing what is going on in the room. They are fitted with restraints that are kept out of sight. They are designed to prevent the individual from self-inflicted suffocation.

== Treatment in police custody ==
In the UK, police guidelines permit Health Care Professionals (in the custody environment this will usually be a doctor, nurse or paramedic) to administer rapid tranquillisation to individuals in police custody suspected to have an Acute Behavioural Disturbance. The guidance emphasises that ABD is a time-critical medical condition and that the patient should be transported to a hospital Emergency Department as soon as possible, specifically by an emergency ambulance crew.
