= Perry v. Louisiana =

- Supreme Court of the United States

Argued October 2, 1990 Decided November 13, 1990
- Full case name: Michael Owen Perry v. State of Louisiana
- Citations: 498 U.S. 38 (more) 111 S. Ct. 449; 112 L. Ed. 2d 338

Case history
- Prior: Certiorari to the 19th Judicial District Court of Louisiana, appeal dismissed, 543 So. 2d 487 (La. 1989); cert. granted, 498 U.S. 38 (1990).
- Subsequent: On remand, State v. Perry, 610 So. 2d 746 (La. 1992).

Holding
- The forcible medication of individuals to render them competent to be executed is impermissible.

Court membership
- Chief Justice William Rehnquist Associate Justices Byron White · Thurgood Marshall; Harry Blackmun · John P. Stevens; Sandra Day O'Connor · Antonin Scalia; Anthony Kennedy · David Souter

Case opinion
- Per curiam
- Souter took no part in the consideration or decision of the case.

Perry v. Louisiana, 498 U.S. 38 (1990), was a United States Supreme Court case over the legality of forcibly medicating a death row inmate with a mental disorder, to render him competent to be executed.

== Background ==
Michael Owen Perry (born December 3, 1954) murdered five people, including his parents and infant nephew, at and around his parents’ home in Lake Arthur, Louisiana. Following the murders, he fled the state, leaving behind a list of five other intended targets, including Justice Sandra Day O'Connor and musician Olivia Newton-John. He was ultimately arrested at a hotel in Washington D.C., apparently on his way to kill O'Connor.

A jury convicted him of the five murders and sentenced him to death. After his sentencing, the trial court found that his competence to be executed depended on his taking psychiatric medication and ordered that he be forcibly medicated to be sure he remained competent. Ford v. Wainwright (1986) had already established that an insane inmate could not be executed.

== Opinion of the Court ==
In a per curiam decision, the Court vacated the lower court's ruling without issuing an opinion. The case was remanded to the Louisiana Supreme Court for further deliberation given Washington v. Harper (1990), also a case involving involuntary medication, which had been decided after the District Court's ruling.

== Aftermath ==
Upon remand, the lower court ruled against the forcible medication of individuals to maintain their competency for execution. This decision was based on the distinction that, unlike the holding in Harper v. Washington concerning involuntary medication for treatment issues, forcing medication for execution was not medical treatment (being "antithetical to the basic principles of the healing arts") but punishment.

In addition, the lower court found two state laws on which to base its holding. First, it found that forcibly medicating a person for execution was cruel and unusual punishment under Louisiana state law because "it fails to measurably contribute to the social goals of capital punishment" by adding to the individual's punishment "beyond that required for the mere extinguishment of life," and could be "administered erroneously, arbitrarily or capriciously." It also held that forcible medication in this situation violated the right to privacy guaranteed by the Louisiana State Constitution because the inhumanity of the situation rendered the state's interest in executing a person under these conditions less compelling.

== Significance ==
Per Ford v. Wainwright, a psychotic inmate who does not have an understanding of what is about to occur is not competent to be executed and, therefore, cannot be executed. The complex issues of forcibly medicating an individual to make him competent for execution posed in Perry v. Louisiana illustrates the conflict between the judicial interests in imposing capital punishment for certain murderers and the medical physician's Hippocratic Oath not to give poison. Medical ethics are also primarily guided by the Hippocratic aphorism "first do no harm" principle.

== See also ==
- List of United States Supreme Court cases, volume 498
- List of United States Supreme Court cases
- Lists of United States Supreme Court cases by volume
- List of United States Supreme Court cases by the Rehnquist Court
- Washington v. Harper (1990)
