= Mental health triage =

Mental health assessment process

Mental health triage is a clinical function conducted at the point of entry to health services that aims to assess and classify the urgency and priority of action of mental health related problems. Mental health triage services may be located in the Emergency Department, community or outpatient facilities, on a telephone support line, or in a facility with other specialist mental health services.
