= Urban Metcalf =

English mental health patient (1775–1820s)

Urban Metcalf (1775 – c. 1820s) was a clothes salesman and asylum patient who was arrested for allegedly attempting to assassinate King George III. Metcalf went in and out of various asylums for his entire adult life before eventually being permanently committed to York asylum in 1822. Metcalf reportedly believed that he was King, based on a 'delusional genealogy', and repeatedly tried to enter royal palaces.

While a patient at Bedlam asylum, Metcalf wrote a pamphlet titled "The Interior of Bethlem Hospital" and sent a copy to Augustus Frederick, Duke of Sussex, one of the governors. The book complained about the conduct of officials at the asylum and "fired a train which exploded and dislodged certain persons and practices.

"When in his state of derangement, his propensity was to claim as his own property the royal palaces at Windsor, Kew, St James's, Buckingham House, &c; and he would frequently visit them all and take imaginary possession of them, by contriving to get within their entrances."
