= Chemical restraint =

Use of drugs to restrict a person's movement

A chemical restraint is an administration of a general anesthetic to a patient without consent. Chemical restraint is used in emergency, acute, and psychiatric settings to perform surgery on uncooperative patients, to control severe agitation, aggression or violent behaviours in patients who pose a danger to staff or themselves, (Note: "Chemical restraint, also known as rapid tranquilisation, is the use of psychotropic medication to control severe agitation, or violent behaviours.") or to control or punish unruly behaviours. A drug used for chemical restraint may also be referred to as a "psychopharmacologic agent", "psychotropic drug" or "therapeutic restraint" in certain legal writing. Leaving a patient unattended after administering a chemical restraint can result in the patient's death.

In the UK, NICE recommends the use of chemical restraint for acute behaviour disturbances (ABD), but only after verbal calming and de-escalation techniques have been attempted. It is viewed as superior to physical restraint, with physical restraints only being recommended for the administration of a chemical restraint. (Note: "Sedation (rapid tranquilisation) will be required to facilitate rapid intervention and institution of potentially lifesaving treatments if an individual displaying [acute behaviour disturbance] ABD fails to respond to de-escalation techniques. The rapid control and calming of an individual displaying the extreme physical exertion associated with ABD is essential to prevent further worsening of their metabolic status. Ideally sedation should be administered via the intravenous route; however, this route is unlikely to be immediately available." "Guidelines for the Management of Excited Delirium / Acute Behavioural Disturbance (ABD)" (PDF). Archived from the original (PDF) on 2020-11-01.)

In the United States, no drugs are presently approved by the U.S. Food and Drug Administration (FDA) for use as chemical restraints. Drugs that are often used as chemical restraints include antipsychotics, benzodiazepines, and dissociative anesthetics such as ketamine. A systematic review in 2019 advised the use of intravenous haloperidol (a short half-life, first-generation antipsychotic) alone or in conjunction with lorazepam or midazolam (short half-life benzodiazepines), but said more research was needed. (Note: "While there is a sizeable, good quality body of RCT [randomized controlled trial] evidence regarding chemical restraint practices from around the world, the interventions, outcome measures, and findings are heterogenous and preclude more than simple description. On the current evidence base from RCTs, front-line clinicians could be advised to use haloperidol (alone or in combination with lorazepam or midazolam) delivered via IV, oral, or intramuscular methods, to safely, speedily, and effectively control agitated, aggressive, and violent behaviours.")

Chemical restraint is sometimes misused by health care workers for the convenience of the staff rather than the benefit of the patient, for example to prevent patients from resisting care, rather than improving the health of the patient; it can cause more confusion in patients, slowing their recovery; and it can be unclear whether drugs used for chemical restraint are necessary to treat an underlying mental health condition or whether they are being used to sedate the patient. Patients can view chemical restraint as a violation of integrity and find the experience traumatic. (Note: "Chemical restraint can furthermore be experienced as a violation of integrity and cause psychological discomfort"; "Further, the individual experience of any form of restraint is well recognized as traumatizing and anti-therapeutic".)

A Human Rights Watch report on the use of chemical restraints amongst the elderly in the US concluded that antipsychotic drugs are sometimes used almost by default to control difficult-to-manage residents. The FDA estimates 15,000 elderly individuals in nursing homes die each year due to the unnecessary use of antipsychotics. According to the Nursing Home Reform Act, individuals have the right to be free from physical or chemical restraints imposed for discipline or convenience and unnecessary to treat the resident's medical symptoms.
