= PsychRights =

U.S. nonprofit organization

The Law Project for Psychiatric Rights, or PsychRights, is an Alaskan organization that seeks to "end the abuses against people diagnosed with mental illness through individual legal representation." The organization is especially focused on fighting involuntary medication and the forced use of electroshock therapy. It contends that the involuntary treatment system operates largely illegally, in that requirements such as the "less restrictive alternative" requirement are often not followed. PsychRights has mounted legal challenges in Alaska, Massachusetts, Minnesota, New York, and other states.
