= Washington v. Harper =

- Supreme Court of the United States

Argued October 11, 1989 Decided February 27, 1990
- Full case name: Washington, et al., Petitioners v. Walter Harper
- Citations: 494 U.S. 210 (more) 110 S. Ct. 1028; 108 L. Ed. 2d 178; 1990 U.S. LEXIS 1174; 58 U.S.L.W. 4249

Holding
- The Due Process Clause permits a state to treat an incarcerated inmate having a serious mental disorder with antipsychotic medication against his will, under the condition that he is dangerous to himself or others and the medication prescribed is in his best medical interest.

Court membership
- Chief Justice William Rehnquist Associate Justices William J. Brennan Jr. · Byron White; Thurgood Marshall · Harry Blackmun; John P. Stevens · Sandra Day O'Connor; Antonin Scalia · Anthony Kennedy

Case opinions
- Majority: Kennedy, joined by unanimous (part II); Rehnquist, White, Blackmun, O'Connor, Scalia (parts I, III, IV, V)
- Concurrence: Blackmun
- Concur/dissent: Stevens, joined by Brennan, Marshall

Laws applied
- U.S. Const. amend. XIV

Washington v. Harper, 494 U.S. 210 (1990), was a United States Supreme Court case in which an incarcerated inmate sued the state of Washington over the issue of involuntary medication, specifically antipsychotic medication.

== Background ==
Walter Harper, an inmate in the Washington prison system since 1976, was reported to be violent when not on antipsychotic medication. Twice he was transferred to the Special Offender Center (SOC), a state institution detaining prisoners who were diagnosed with psychiatric problems. While there, Harper was forced to take psychiatric medication against his will. The SOC followed its policies of institutional review for making a treatment decision to forcibly medicate an inmate.

Upon hospitalizing Harper a second time at the center, Harper filed suit in state court under 42 U.S.C. 1983, alleging that the Center failed to provide a judicial hearing before involuntarily medicating him, thus violating the due process clause of the Fourteenth Amendment. The trial court rejected his claim but the State Supreme Court reversed the decision and remanded the case back to the trial court stating that the State could administer antipsychotic medication to a competent, nonconsenting inmate only if, in a judicial hearing, at which the inmate had full adversarial procedural protections, the State could prove by "clear, cogent, and [494 U.S. 210, 211] convincing" evidence that the forced medication was necessary and effective for furthering an important state interest, weighing the individual's interest against that of the state.

The United States Supreme Court granted a Writ of Certiorari.

The American Psychological Association submitted an amicus brief in support of the inmate's right to a due process hearing, stating forced medication of an incarcerated inmate violated the due process, equal protection, and free speech clauses of the Constitution of the United States.

== Opinion of the Court ==
The Court reversed, finding the use of an internal institutional review was adequate in making treatment decisions in this case under the lesser standard of review embodied in Turner v. Safley, 482 U.S. 78 (1987).

The United States Supreme court ruled that the Due Process Clause permits a state to treat an incarcerated inmate having a serious mental disorder with antipsychotic medication against his will, under the condition that he is dangerous to himself or others and the medication prescribed is in his best medical interest.

== See also ==
- Riggins v. Nevada, 504 U.S. 127 (1992)
- Perry v. Louisiana, 498 U.S. 38 (1990)
