= Involuntary commitment =

Compulsory hospitalization

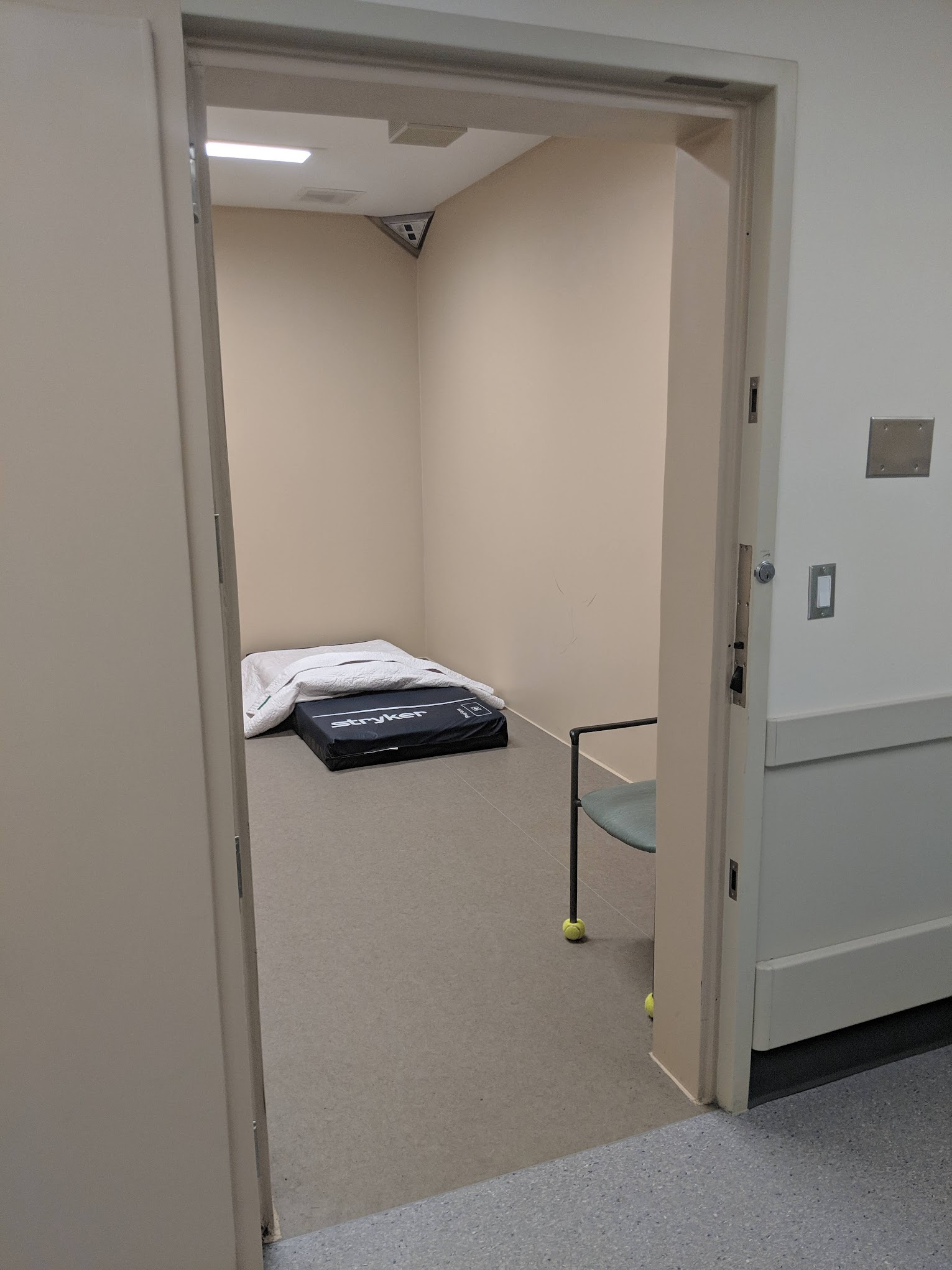
A seclusion room within the emergency department of a hospital.

Involuntary commitment, civil commitment, or involuntary hospitalization/hospitalisation, or informally in the United Kingdom and Commonwealth Realms sectioning, being sectioned, commitment, or being committed, is a legal process through which an individual who is deemed by a qualified person to have symptoms of severe mental disorder is detained in a psychiatric hospital (inpatient) where they can be treated involuntarily. This treatment may involve the administration of psychoactive drugs, including involuntary administration. In many jurisdictions, people diagnosed with mental health disorders can also be forced to undergo treatment while in the community; this is sometimes referred to as outpatient commitment and shares legal processes with commitment. Importantly, the term "involuntary commitment" in the United States does not always refer to a legal intervention, but rather refers to an ethical lens from the perspective of individual autonomy. Users of the term are therefore recommended to define precisely what they mean by "involuntary commitment," such as by clarifying the extent they refer to external pressure, civil rights, individual agency, competence and capacity, and ethics.

Criteria for civil commitment are established by laws which vary between nations. Commitment proceedings often follow a period of emergency hospitalization, during which an individual with acute psychiatric symptoms is confined for a relatively short duration (e.g. 72 hours) in a treatment facility for evaluation and stabilization by mental health professionals who may then determine whether further civil commitment is appropriate or necessary. Civil commitment procedures may take place in a court or only involve physicians. If commitment does not involve a court, there is normally an appeal process that does involve the judiciary in some capacity, though potentially through a specialist court. (Note: See table 2, many countries such as Australia, Denmark, England and Spain do not require the involvement of the judiciary for commitment. See for a discussion of mental-health tribunals.)

== Purpose ==
For most jurisdictions, involuntary commitment is applied to individuals believed to be experiencing a mental illness that impairs their ability to reason to such an extent that the agents of the law, state, or courts determine that decisions will be made for the individual under a legal framework. In some jurisdictions, this is a proceeding distinct from being found incompetent. Involuntary commitment is used in some degree for each of the following although different jurisdictions have different criteria. Some jurisdictions limit involuntary treatment to individuals who meet statutory criteria for presenting a danger to self or others. Other jurisdictions have broader criteria. The legal process by which commitment takes place varies between jurisdictions. Some jurisdictions have a formal court hearing where testimony and other evidence may also be submitted and the subject of the hearing is typically entitled to legal counsel and may challenge a commitment order through habeas corpus. Other jurisdictions have delegated these power to physicians, though may provide an appeal process that involves the judiciary but may also involve physicians. (Note: For a discussion of the role of physicians in mental health tribunals and its effects see) For example, in the UK a mental health tribunal consists of a judge, a medical member, and a lay representative. (Note: "The chair of each Mental Health Tribunal is a legal member who is known as a tribunal judge. There are usually three tribunal members at a hearing, one legal member, one medical member, and one other member, as defined above. Any three or more such members, constituted in this manner, may exercise the jurisdiction of a Mental Health Tribunal")

=== First aid ===
Training is gradually becoming available in mental health first aid to equip community members such as teachers, school administrators, police officers, and medical workers with training in recognizing, and authority in managing, situations where involuntary evaluations of behavior are applicable under law. The extension of first aid training to cover mental health problems and crises is a quite recent development. A mental health first aid training course was developed in Australia in 2001 and has been found to improve assistance provided to persons with an alleged mental illness or mental health crisis. This form of training has now spread to a number of other countries (Canada, Finland, Hong Kong, Ireland, Singapore, Scotland, England, Wales, and the United States). Mental health triage may be used in an emergency room to make a determination about potential risk and apply treatment protocols.

=== Observation ===
Observation is sometimes used to determine whether a person warrants involuntary commitment. It is not always clear on a relatively brief examination whether a person should be committed.

=== Containment of danger ===
Austria, Belgium, Germany, Israel, the Netherlands, Northern Ireland, the Republic of Ireland, Russia, Taiwan, Canada, and the United States have adopted commitment criteria based on the presumed danger of the defendant to self or to others.

People with suicidal thoughts may act on these impulses and harm or kill themselves.

People with psychosis are occasionally driven by their delusions or hallucinations to harm themselves or others. Research has found that those with schizophrenia are between 3.4 and 7.4 times more likely to engage in violent behaviour than members of the general public. However, because other confounding factors such as childhood adversity and poverty are correlated with both schizophrenia and violence it can be difficult to determine whether this effect is due to schizophrenia or other factors. In an attempt to avoid these confounding factors, researchers have tried comparing the rates of violence amongst people diagnosed with schizophrenia to their siblings in a similar manner to twin studies. In these studies siblings with schizophrenia were found to be between 1.3 and 1.8 times more likely to engage in violent behaviour.

People with certain types of personality disorders can occasionally present a danger to themselves or others.

This concern has found expression in the standards for involuntary commitment in every US state and in other countries as the danger to self or others standard, sometimes supplemented by the requirement that the danger be imminent. In some jurisdictions, the danger to self or others standard has been broadened in recent years to include need-for-treatment criteria such as "gravely disabled".

== Criticism ==
The potential dangers of institutions have been noted and criticized by reformers/activists almost since their foundation. Charles Dickens was an outspoken and high-profile early critic, and several of his novels, in particular Oliver Twist and Hard Times demonstrate his insight into the damage that institutions can do to human beings.

=== Deinstitutionalization ===
Enoch Powell, when Minister for Health in the early 1960s, was a later opponent who was appalled by what he witnessed on his visits to the asylums. In a speech in 1961 he called for the integration of the asylums into general hospitals.

Starting in the 1960s, there has been a worldwide trend toward moving psychiatric patients from hospital settings to less restricting settings in the community, a shift known as "deinstitutionalization". Because the shift was typically not accompanied by a commensurate development of community-based services, critics say that deinstitutionalization has led to large numbers of people who would once have been inpatients as instead being incarcerated or becoming homeless. In some jurisdictions, laws authorizing court-ordered outpatient treatment have been passed in an effort to compel individuals with chronic, untreated severe mental illness to take psychiatric medication while living outside the hospital (e.g. Laura's Law, Kendra's Law).

In a study of 269 patients from Vermont State Hospital done by Courtenay M. Harding and associates, about two-thirds of the ex-patients did well after deinstitutionalization.

"There they stand, isolated, majestic, imperious, brooded over by the gigantic water-tower and chimney combined, rising unmistakable and daunting out of the countryside – the asylums which our forefathers built with such immense solidity to express the notions of their day. Do not for a moment underestimate their powers of resistance to our assault."

Numerous scandals followed, with many high-profile public inquiries. These involved the exposure of abuses such as unscientific surgical techniques such as lobotomy and the widespread neglect and abuse of vulnerable patients in the US and Europe. The growing anti-psychiatry movement in the 1960s and 1970s led in Italy to the first successful legislative challenge to the authority of the mental institutions, culminating in their closure. Nonetheless, the involuntary commitment has never ceased to be in force in Italy, despite the evidence of the positive results of its elimination. A prominent example is the work carried out by Giorgio Antonucci at the Osservanza and Luigi Lolli psychiatric hospitals in Imola, northern Italy, where any form of coercion had been eliminated by Antonucci, who applied a non-psychiatric approach to human suffering.

During the 1970s and 1990s the hospital population started to fall rapidly, mainly because of the deaths of long-term inmates. Significant efforts were made to re-house large numbers of former residents in a variety of suitable or otherwise alternative accommodation. The first 1,000+ bed hospital to close was Darenth Park Hospital in Kent, swiftly followed by many more across the UK. The haste of these closures under Conservative governments led by Margaret Thatcher and John Major, resulted in considerable criticism in the press.

=== Wrongful commitment ===
There are instances in which mental health professionals have wrongfully deemed individuals to have been displaying the symptoms of a mental disorder, and committed the individual for treatment in a psychiatric hospital upon such grounds. Claims of wrongful commitment are a common theme in the anti-psychiatry movement.

In 1860, the case of Elizabeth Packard, who was wrongfully committed that year and filed a lawsuit and won thereafter, highlighted the issue of wrongful involuntary commitment. In 1887, investigative journalist Nellie Bly went undercover at an asylum in New York City to expose the terrible conditions that mental patients at the time had to deal with. She published her findings and experiences as articles in New York World, and later made the articles into one book called Ten Days in a Mad-House.

In the first half of the twentieth century there were a few high-profile cases of wrongful commitment based on racism or punishment for political dissenters. In the former Soviet Union, psychiatric hospitals were used as prisons to isolate political prisoners from the rest of society. British playwright Tom Stoppard wrote Every Good Boy Deserves Favour about the relationship between a patient and his doctor in one of these hospitals. Stoppard was inspired by a meeting with a Russian exile. In 1927, after the execution of Sacco and Vanzetti in the United States, demonstrator Aurora D'Angelo was sent to a mental health facility for psychiatric evaluation after she participated in a rally in support of the anarchists.

Throughout the 1940s and 1950s in Canada, 20,000 Canadian children, called the Duplessis orphans, were wrongfully certified as being mentally ill and as a result were committed to psychiatric institutions where they were allegedly forced to take psychiatric medication that they did not need and were abused. They were named after Maurice Duplessis, the premier of Quebec at the time, who deliberately committed these children to misappropriate additional subsidies from the federal government. Decades later in the 1990s, several of the orphans sued Quebec and the Catholic Church for the abuse and wrongdoing. In 1958, black pastor and activist Clennon Washington King Jr. tried enrolling at the University of Mississippi, which at the time was white, for summer classes; the local police secretly arrested and involuntarily committed him to a mental hospital for 12 days.

Patients are able to sue if they believe that they have been wrongfully committed. In one instance, Junius Wilson, an African American man, was committed to Cherry Hospital in Goldsboro, North Carolina in 1925 for an alleged crime without a trial or conviction. He was castrated. He continued to be held at Cherry Hospital for the next 67 years of his life. It turned out he was deaf rather than mentally ill.

In many U.S. states, sex offenders who have completed a period of incarceration can be civilly committed to a mental institution based on a finding of dangerousness due to a mental disorder. Although the United States Supreme Court determined that this practice does not constitute double jeopardy, organizations such as the American Psychiatric Association (APA) strongly oppose the practice. The Task Force on Sexually Dangerous Offenders, a component of APA's Council on Psychiatry and Law, reported that "in the opinion of the task force, sexual predator commitment laws represent a serious assault on the integrity of psychiatry, particularly with regard to defining mental illness and the clinical conditions for compulsory treatment. Moreover, by bending civil commitment to serve essentially non-medical purposes, statutes threaten to undermine the legitimacy of the medical model of commitment."

== By country ==
=== France ===
In 1838, France enacted a law to regulate both the admissions into asylums and asylum services across the country. Édouard Séguin developed a systematic approach for training individuals with mental deficiencies, and, in 1839, he opened the first school for intellectually disabled people. His method of treatment was based on the idea that intellectually disabled people did not suffer from disease.

=== United Kingdom ===
In the United Kingdom, provision for the care of the mentally ill began in the early 19th century with a state-led effort. Public mental asylums were established in Britain after the passing of the 1808 County Asylums Act. This empowered magistrates to build rate-supported asylums in every county to house the many "pauper lunatics". Nine counties first applied, and the first public asylum opened in 1812 in Nottinghamshire. Parliamentary Committees were established to investigate abuses at private madhouses like Bethlem Hospital – its officers were eventually dismissed and national attention was focused on the routine use of bars, chains and handcuffs and the filthy conditions in which the inmates lived. However, it was not until 1828 that the newly appointed Commissioners in Lunacy were empowered to license and supervise private asylums.

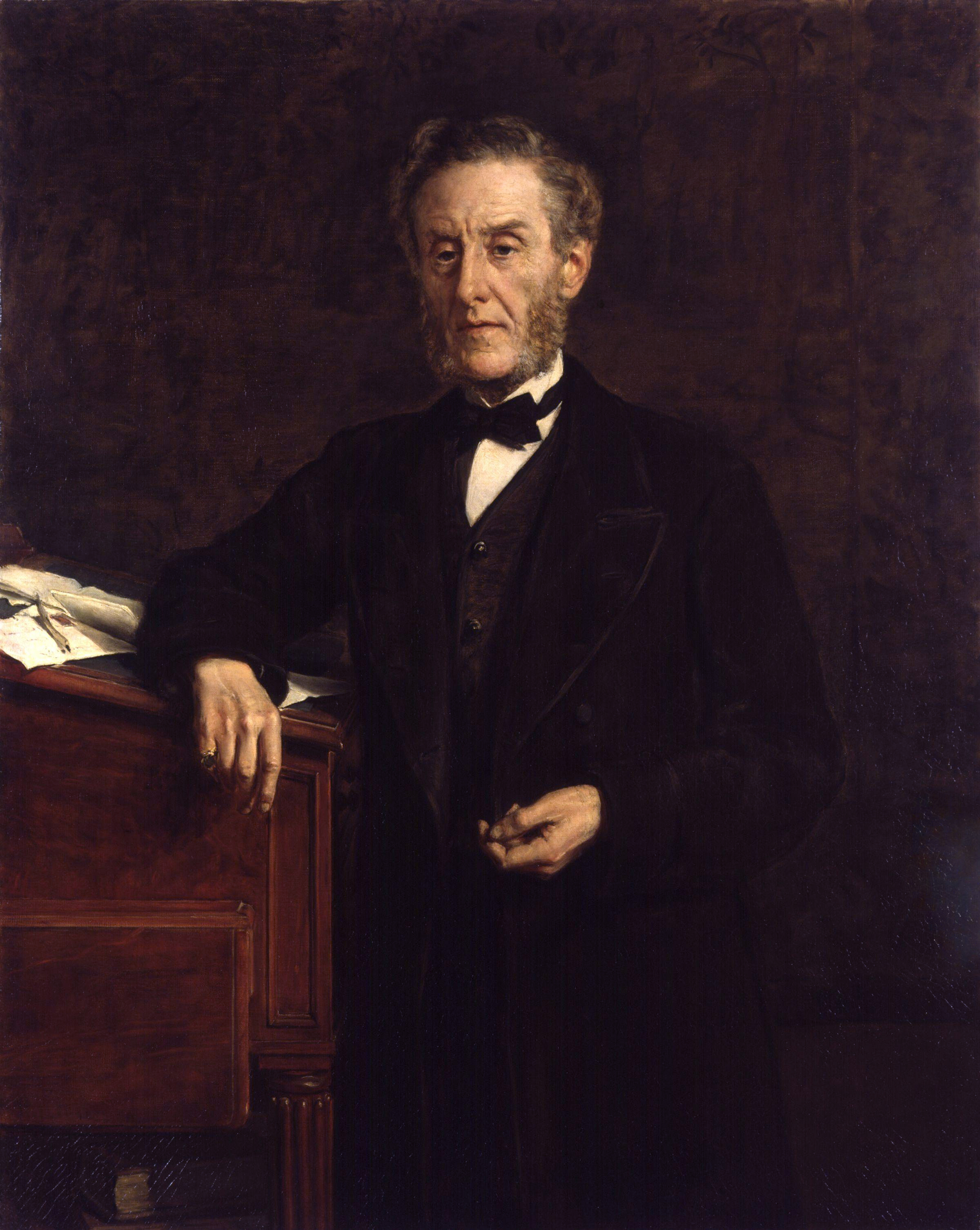
Lord Shaftesbury, a vigorous campaigner for the reform of lunacy law in England, and the Head of the Lunacy Commission for 40 years.

The Lunacy Act 1845 was a landmark in the treatment of the mentally ill, as it explicitly changed the status of mentally ill people to patients who required treatment. The Act created the Lunacy Commission, headed by Lord Shaftesbury, focusing on reform of the legislation concerning lunacy. The commission consisted of eleven Metropolitan Commissioners who were required to carry out the provisions of the Act; the compulsory construction of asylums in every county, with regular inspections on behalf of the Home Secretary. All asylums were required to have written regulations and to have a resident qualified physician. A national body for asylum superintendents – the Medico-Psychological Association – was established in 1866 under the Presidency of William A. F. Browne, although the body appeared in an earlier form in 1841.

By the late 1800s, there were almost 300 public and private asylums in Britain and Ireland. By the late 1890s and early 1900s, those so detained had risen to the hundreds of thousands. However, the idea that mental illness could be ameliorated through institutionalization was soon disappointed. Psychiatrists were pressured by an ever-increasing patient population. The average number of patients in asylums kept increasing. Asylums were quickly becoming almost indistinguishable from custodial institutions, and the reputation of psychiatry in the medical world was at an extreme low.

In modern times involuntary detention and treatment without agreement as regulated under one of various sections of the Mental Health Act 1983 is informally known as "sectioning". Sectioning is now regulated by the Mental Health Act 2007 in England and Wales, the Mental Health (Care and Treatment) (Scotland) Act 2003 in Scotland and other legislation in Northern Ireland.

=== United States ===
In the United States, the erection of state asylums began with the first law for the creation of one in New York, passed in 1842. The Utica State Hospital was opened approximately in 1850. The creation of this hospital, as of many others, was largely the work of Dorothea Lynde Dix, whose philanthropic efforts extended over many states, and in Europe as far as Constantinople. Many state hospitals in the United States were built in the 1850s and 1860s on the Kirkbride Plan, an architectural style meant to have curative effect.

In the United States and most other developed societies, severe restrictions have been placed on the circumstances under which a person may be committed or treated against their will as such actions have been ruled by the United States Supreme Court and other national legislative bodies as a violation of civil rights and/or human rights. The Supreme Court case O'Connor v. Donaldson established that the mere presence of mental illness and the necessity for treatment are not sufficient by themselves to justify involuntary commitment, if the patient is capable of surviving in freedom and does not present a danger of harm to themselves or others. Criteria for involuntary commitment are generally set by the individual states, and often have both short- and long-term types of commitment. For example, Kentucky and Ohio have enacted Casey's Law, which permits family members to petition for the involuntary commitment of individuals with substance use disorder through a civil court process. Short-term commitment tends to be a few days or less, requiring an examination by a medical professional, while longer-term commitment typically requires a court hearing, or sentencing as part of a criminal trial. Indefinite commitment is rare and is usually reserved for individuals who are violent or present an ongoing danger to themselves and others.

New York City officials under several administrations have implemented programs involving the involuntary hospitalization of people with mental illnesses in the city. Some of these policies have involved reinterpreting the standard of "harm to themselves or others" to include neglecting their own well-being or posing a harm to themselves or others in the future. In 1987–88, a homeless woman named Joyce Brown worked with the New York Civil Liberties Union to challenge her forced hospitalization under new Mayor Ed Koch's administration program. The trial, which attracted significant media attention, ended in her favor, and while the city won on appeal she was ultimately released after a subsequent case determined she could not be forcibly medicated. In 2022, Mayor Eric Adams announced a similar compulsory hospitalization program, relying on similar legal interpretations.

Historically, until the mid-1960s in most jurisdictions in the United States, all committals to public psychiatric facilities and most committals to private ones were involuntary. Since then, there have been alternating trends towards the abolition or substantial reduction of involuntary commitment, a trend known as deinstitutionalisation. In many currents, individuals can voluntarily admit themselves to a mental health hospital and may have more rights than those who are involuntarily committed. This practice is referred to as voluntary commitment.

In the United States, Kansas v. Hendricks established the procedures for a long-term or indefinite form of commitment applicable to people convicted of some sexual offences.

In July 2025, President Donald Trump issued Executive Order 14321, "Ending Crime and Disorder on America's Streets," seeking to expand involuntary civil commitment for unhoused individuals with serious mental illness or substance use disorders by directing federal agencies to encourage states to reverse court precedents limiting commitment, shift grant funding, and prioritize moving people from streets into institutional treatment, moving away from housing-first policies. The order aims to use federal resources to pressure states to adopt more flexible civil commitment standards, potentially impacting disability rights and constitutional due process protections.

Several groups including the American Bar Association have questioned the ethics and legality of the measure:

The Order raises serious constitutional and civil rights concerns—particularly regarding due process under the Fourteenth Amendment and the rights of individuals with disabilities under the Americans with Disabilities Act (ADA). Its proposed standard for commitment—encompassing not only those who pose a risk to self or others but also those who are merely unable to care for themselves—falls short of established constitutional safeguards.

=== United Nations ===
In 2022, the United Nations Committee on the Rights of Persons with Disabilities recommended the abolition of "all forms of institutionalization". The World Health Organization has published the QualityRights handbook and e-training to promote the rights of "people with psychosocial, cognitive, or intellectual disabilities".

Previously, in 1991, the United Nations General Assembly adopted resolution 46/119 which merely asserted patients' rights to be treated nearby their family and community, and "to return to the community as soon as possible".

== See also ==
- 5150 (involuntary psychiatric hold)
- Baker Act
- Civil confinement
- Conversion therapy
- Criminal justice
- Giorgio Antonucci
- Institutional syndrome
- John Hunt
- Medical law
- Mental Health Act 2007
- Special commitment center
- Ulysses contract

=== In the creative arts ===
- Cool Hand Luke
- if....
- Forrest Gump (novel)
  - Forrest Gump (film) based on the novel
- Girl, Interrupted
- One Flew Over the Cuckoo's Nest (novel)
  - One Flew Over the Cuckoo's Nest (film),
  - One Flew Over the Cuckoo's Nest (play)
- Rebel without a Cause
