= Thomas Szasz =

Hungarian-American psychiatrist and activist (1920–2012)

- Szász Tamás István
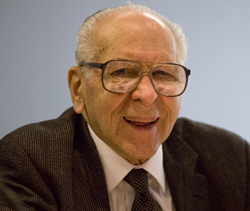
- Szasz in 2010
- Born: Szász Tamás István; April 15, 1920; Budapest, Kingdom of Hungary
- Died: September 8, 2012 (aged 92); Manlius, New York, U.S.
- Citizenship: Hungary, United States
- Education: University of Cincinnati
- Known for: Criticism of psychiatry
- Spouse: Rosine Loshkajian (m. 1951; died 1971)
- Children: 2
- Scientific career
- Fields: Psychiatry
- Workplaces: State University of New York Upstate Medical University
- Website: szasz.com

Thomas Stephen Szasz (/sɑːs/ SAHSS; Hungarian: Szász Tamás István [saːs]; 15 April 1920 – 8 September 2012) was a Hungarian-American academic and psychiatrist. He served for most of his career as professor of psychiatry at the State University of New York Upstate Medical University. A distinguished lifetime fellow of the American Psychiatric Association and a life member of the American Psychoanalytic Association, he was best known as a social critic of the moral and scientific foundations of psychiatry, as what he saw as the social control aims of medicine in modern society, as well as scientism.

Szasz maintained throughout his career that he was not anti-psychiatry but rather that he opposed coercive psychiatry. He was a staunch opponent of civil commitment and involuntary psychiatric treatment but believed in and practiced psychiatry and psychotherapy that involved consenting adults.

== Life ==
Szasz was born on April 15, 1920, in Budapest, Hungary, the second son of Jewish parents Gyula and Lily Szász. In 1938, the family moved to the United States, where he attended the University of Cincinnati for his Bachelor of Science in physics, followed by an MD.

Szasz completed his residency requirement at the Cincinnati General Hospital, then trained as a psychoanalyst at Chicago Institute for Psychoanalysis from 1951 to 1956. He took a position as a professor at State University of New York in 1956 and received tenure in 1962, taking 24 months out for duty as a practicing psychiatrist with the U.S. Naval Reserve.

Szasz had two daughters. His wife, Rosine, died in 1971.

== Career ==
Thomas Szasz was a strong critic of institutional psychiatry and was a prolific writer. According to psychiatrist Tony B. Benning, there were "three major themes in Szasz's writings: his contention that there is no such thing as mental illness, his contention that individual responsibility is never compromised in those suffering from what is generally considered as mental illness, and his perennial interest in calling attention to the political nature of psychiatric diagnosis". According to Williams and Caplan, Szasz is "best known for his view that without a diagnosis of neurological disease or damage, a psychiatric diagnosis was meaningless".

Szasz first presented his attack on "mental illness" as a legal term in 1958 in the Columbia Law Review. In his article he argued that mental illness was no more a fact bearing on a suspect's guilt than is possession by the devil. His books The Myth of Mental Illness (1961) and The Manufacture of Madness (1970) set out some of the arguments most associated with him. In 1961, Szasz testified before a United States Senate committee, arguing that using mental hospitals to incarcerate people defined as insane violated the general assumptions of the patient–doctor relationship, and turned the doctor into a warden and keeper of a prison.

Szasz was convinced there was a metaphorical character to mental disorders, and its uses in psychiatry were frequently injurious. He set himself a task to delegitimize legitimating agencies and authorities, and what he saw as their vast powers, enforced by psychiatrists and other mental health professionals, mental health laws, mental health courts, and mental health sentences. Szasz was a critic of the influence of modern medicine on society, which he considered to be the secularization of religion's hold on humankind. Criticizing scientism, he targeted psychiatry in particular, underscoring its campaigns against masturbation at the end of the 19th century, its use of medical imagery and language to describe misbehavior, its reliance on involuntary mental hospitalization to protect society, and the use of lobotomy and other interventions to treat psychosis. Szasz consistently paid attention to the power of language in the establishment and maintenance of the social order, both in small interpersonal and in wider social, economic, and/or political spheres.

== Death ==
Szasz's colleague Jeff Schaler described his death as a suicide. Szasz ended his own life on September 8, 2012, after suffering a painful spinal-compression fracture from a recent fall. Szasz had previously argued for the right to die in his writings. By Schaler's account, the exact method of suicide is unknown: "It is not known whether the prescription for pain pills is what he [Szasz] used to end his life." Considering this and moreover without Schaler's account, Szasz's death cannot absolutely be considered a suicide.

== Positions ==
=== Mental illness as a myth ===
In Szasz's view, people who are said to have a mental illness only have "problems in living". Diagnoses of "mental illness" or "mental disorder" are passed off as scientific but are judgments (of disdain) to support certain uses of power by authorities. In that line of thinking, schizophrenia becomes not the name of a disease entity but a judgment of extreme psychiatric and social disapprobation. Szasz called schizophrenia "the sacred symbol of psychiatry" because those so labeled have long provided and continue to provide justification for psychiatric theories, treatments, abuses, and reforms.

Szasz argued that psychiatry is a pseudoscience that parodies medicine by abusing medical terminology and that, supported by the state through various mental health acts, it has become a modern secular state religion. As a vastly elaborate social control system that disguises itself under the claims of being rational, systematic, and therefore scientific, it constitutes a fundamental threat to freedom and dignity. In The Myth of Mental Illness he argued that people can only play "the mental illness game" if their partner and those around them play a complementary role – a situation that would later be described as codependency.

=== Separation of psychiatry and state ===
Szasz believed that if we accept "mental illness" as a euphemism for deviant behavior, then the state has no right to force psychiatric "treatment" on these individuals. Similarly, the state should not be able to interfere in mental health practices between consenting adults (for example, by legally controlling the supply of psychotropic drugs or psychiatric medication). The medicalization of government produces a "therapeutic state", designating someone as, for example, "insane" or as a "drug addict".

In Ceremonial Chemistry (1974), he argued that the same persecution that targeted witches, Jews, gypsies, and homosexuals now targets "drug addicts" and "insane" people. Szasz argued that all these categories of people were taken as scapegoats of the community in ritual ceremonies. To underscore this continuation of religion through medicine, he even takes as an example obesity: instead of concentrating on junk food (ill-nutrition), physicians denounced hypernutrition. According to Szasz, despite their scientific appearance, the diets imposed were a moral substitute for the former fasts, and the social injunction not to be overweight is to be considered as a moral order, not as scientific advice as it claims to be. As with those thought bad (insane people), and those who took the wrong drugs (drug addicts), medicine created a category for those who had the wrong weight (obesity).

Szasz argued that psychiatrics were created in the 17th century to study and control those who erred from the medical norms of social behavior; a new specialization, "drogophobia", was created in the 20th century to study and control those who erred from the medical norms of drug consumption; and then, in the 1960s, another specialization, bariatrics, was created to deal with those who deviated from the medical norms concerning the weight the body should have. Thus, he underscores that in 1970 the American Society of Bariatric Physicians had 30 members, and already 450 two years later.

==== Therapeutic state ====
The "therapeutic state" is a phrase coined by Szasz in 1963. The collaboration between psychiatry and government leads to what Szasz calls the therapeutic state, a system in which disapproved actions, thoughts, and emotions are repressed ("cured") through pseudomedical interventions. Thus suicide, unconventional religious beliefs, racial bigotry, unhappiness, anxiety, shyness, sexual promiscuity, shoplifting, gambling, overeating, smoking, and illegal drug use are all considered symptoms or illnesses that need to be cured. When faced with demands for measures to curtail smoking in public, binge-drinking, gambling or obesity, ministers say that "we must guard against charges of nanny statism." The "nanny state" has turned into the "therapeutic state" where nanny has given way to counselor. Nanny just told people what to do; counselors also tell them what to think and what to feel. The "nanny state" was punitive, austere, and authoritarian; the therapeutic state is touchy-feely, supportive, and even more authoritarian.

According to Szasz, "the therapeutic state swallows up everything human on the seemingly rational ground that nothing falls outside the province of health and medicine, just as the theological state had swallowed up everything human on the perfectly rational ground that nothing falls outside the province of God and religion." Faced with the problem of "madness", Western individualism proved to be ill-prepared to defend the rights of the individual: modern man has no more right to be a madman than medieval man had a right to be a heretic because if once people agree that they have identified the one true God, or Good, it brings about that they have to guard members and nonmembers of the group from the temptation to worship false gods or goods. A secularization of God and the medicalization of good resulted in the post-Enlightenment version of this view: once people agree that they have identified the one true reason, it brings about that they have to guard against the temptation to worship unreason – that is, madness. Civil libertarians warn that the marriage of the state with psychiatry could have catastrophic consequences for civilization. In the same vein as the separation of church and state, Szasz believes that a solid wall must exist between psychiatry and the state.

=== Abolition of involuntary commitment ===
Szasz made efforts to abolish involuntary psychiatric hospitalization for over two decades, and in 1970 took a part in founding the American Association for the Abolition of Involuntary Mental Hospitalization (AAAIMH). Its founding was announced by Szasz in 1971 in the American Journal of Psychiatry and American Journal of Public Health. Until it was dissolved in 1980, the association provided legal help to psychiatric patients and published a journal, The Abolitionist.

According to Williams and Caplan, "Szasz's philosophical activism was not intended to improve the treatment of people affected by mental illness as much as to block involuntary treatment." Citing Szasz's writings, legal reforms were enacted, and all 50 US states narrowed their criteria for involuntary commitment from the prior standard of "need for treatment"—reducing the number of patients in public psychiatric hospitals and rapidly increasing the homeless population. It also increased the prison population, estimated at 40–80% inmates with mental illness by 2006. Three legal decisions were key:

- Lessard v. Schmidt (1972) required states to narrow their vague commitment statutes,
- O'Connor v. Donaldson (1975) limited commitment to imminently dangerous mentally ill persons, and
- Rennie v. Klein (1978) established the right of patients to refuse mental treatment.

=== Abolition of the insanity defense ===
Szasz advocated for the removal of the insanity defense. Just as legal systems work on the presumption that a person is innocent until proven guilty, individuals accused of crimes should not be presumed incompetent simply because a doctor or psychiatrist labels them as such. Mental incompetence should be assessed like any other form of incompetence, i.e., by purely legal and judicial means, with the right of representation and appeal by the accused. Szasz believed that testimony about the mental competence of a defendant should not be admissible in trials. Szasz compared psychiatric testimony in court to religious testimony, suggesting that both lack empirical grounding. Szasz argued that the insanity defense was a legal tactic invented to circumvent the punishments of the church, which at the time included confiscation of the property of those who committed suicide, often leaving widows and orphans destitute. Only an insane person would do such a thing to his widow and children, it was successfully argued. This is legal mercy masquerading as medicine, according to Szasz.

=== Right to drugs ===
According to Szasz, drug addiction is not a "disease" to be cured through legal drugs but a social habit. Szasz also argued in favor of a free market for drugs. He criticized the war on drugs, arguing that using drugs is in fact a victimless crime. Prohibition itself constituted the crime. He argued that the war on drugs leads states to do things that would have never been considered half a century before, such as prohibiting a person from ingesting certain substances or interfering in other countries to impede the production of certain plants, e.g. coca eradication plans, or the campaigns against opium; both are traditional plants opposed by the Western world. Although Szasz was skeptical about the merits of psychotropic medications, he favored the repeal of drug prohibition. Szasz also drew analogies between the persecution of the drug-using minority and the persecution of Jewish and homosexual minorities.

The Nazis spoke of having a "Jewish problem". We now speak of having a drug-abuse problem. Actually, "Jewish problem" was the name the Germans gave to their persecution of the Jews; "drug-abuse problem" is the name we give to the persecution of people who use certain drugs.

— Szasz in The Second Sin (1973)

Szasz cites former U.S. Representative James M. Hanley's reference to drug users as "vermin", using "the same metaphor for condemning persons who use or sell illegal drugs that the Nazis used to justify murdering Jews by poisoned gas—namely, that the persecuted persons are not human beings, but "vermin."

=== Right to die ===
In an analogy to birth control, Szasz argued that individuals should be able to choose when to die without interference from medicine or the state, just as they are able to choose when to conceive without outside interference. He considered suicide and the right to die to be among the most fundamental rights, but he opposed state-sanctioned euthanasia. In his 2006 book about Virginia Woolf, Szasz stated that Woolf put an end to her life by a conscious and deliberate act, her suicide being an expression of her freedom of choice.

== Citizens Commission on Human Rights ==
In 1969, Szasz and the Church of Scientology co-founded the Citizens Commission on Human Rights (CCHR) to oppose involuntary psychiatric treatments. Szasz served on CCHR's Board of Advisors as Founding Commissioner. In the keynote address at the 25th anniversary of CCHR, Szasz stated, "We should all honor CCHR because it is really the organization that for the first time in human history has organized a politically, socially, internationally significant voice to combat psychiatry. This has never been done in human history before." In a 2009 interview aired by the Australian Broadcasting Corporation, Szasz explained that he was an atheist and collaborated with Scientology only out of convenience, as an organization with money who were active in this cause.

== Reception ==
In the summer of 2001, Szasz took part in a Russell Tribunal on human rights in psychiatry held in Berlin between June 30 and July 2, 2001, and was part of the majority verdict which claimed that there was "serious abuse of human rights in psychiatry" and that psychiatry was "guilty of the combination of force and unaccountability". In 2005, Robert Evan Kendell presented a critique of Szasz's conception of disease and the contention that mental illness is "mythical" as presented in The Myth of Mental Illness. Kendell argued that Szasz's conception of disease exclusively in terms of "lesion", i.e., morphological abnormality, is arbitrary and unsound, and his argument that "disease or illness can only affect the body" was based on Cartesian dualism which is already known to be medically inaccurate.

In 2011, Szasz published an essay in recognition of the 50th anniversary of The Myth of Mental Illness, which had been delivered as a plenary address at the 2010 International Congress of the Royal College of Psychiatrists in Edinburgh. In the same issue, a response from Edward Shorter echoed Kendell's criticism and dismissed Szasz as largely premised on a conception of mind drawn from the psychiatry of the early-mid 20th century – namely psychoanalytic psychiatry – which does not exist in the current disciplines of psychiatry or medicine. Modern psychiatry has de facto dispensed with the idea of mental illness, i.e., the notion that psychiatric disease is mainly or entirely psychogenic and is not a part of biological psychiatry. To this extent, he said, Szasz's critique does not address contemporary biologically-oriented psychiatry, and is irrelevant.

According to Williams and Caplan (2012), Szasz mostly influenced libertarians and the anti-psychiatry movement, with resultant devastating effects on those with severe mental illness, by promoting his "non-evidence based, philosophical foundation for the practice of mental health that prioritised the views and preferences of individuals with serious mental disorders above the true interests of a person not in the grip of mental illness". Considering that mental illness greatly contributes to homelessness and incarceration in the USA, they challenge whether "people with serious mental disorders who are confined to these settings [are] any better off than their pre-Szaszian predecessors who once filled asylums?"

=== Awards ===
Szasz received significant public recognition for his work, including:

- American Humanist Association Humanist of the Year (1973)
- Award for Greatest Public Service Benefiting the Disadvantaged, an award given out annually by Jefferson Awards (1974)
- an honorary doctorate in behavioral science at Universidad Francisco Marroquín (1979)
- American Psychological Association division of Humanistic Psychology Rollo May Award (1998)
- The Center for Independent Thought established the Thomas S. Szasz Award for Outstanding Contributions to the Cause of Civil Liberties

== Writings ==
=== Books ===
- Pain and Pleasure: A Study of Bodily Feelings. Syracuse, New York: Syracuse University Press. 1988 [1957]. ISBN 978-0815602309.
- The Myth of Mental Illness: Foundations of a Theory of Personal Conduct. Harper & Row. 1974 [1961]. ISBN 978-0060141967.
- Law, Liberty, and Psychiatry: An Inquiry into the Social Uses of Mental Health Practices. Syracuse, New York: Syracuse University Press. 1989 [1963]. ISBN 978-0815602422.
- Psychiatric Justice. Syracuse, New York: Syracuse University Press. 1988 [1965]. ISBN 978-0815602316.
- The Ethics of Psychoanalysis: The Theory and Method of Autonomous Psychotherapy. Syracuse, New York: Syracuse University Press. 1988 [1965]. ISBN 978-0815602293.
- Ideology and Insanity: Essays on the Psychiatric Dehumanization of Man. Syracuse, New York: Syracuse University Press. 1991 [1970]. ISBN 978-0815602569.
- The Manufacture of Madness: A Comparative Study of the Inquisition and the Mental Health Movement. Syracuse, New York: Syracuse University Press. 1997 [1970]. ISBN 978-0815604617.
- The Second Sin. Routledge & Kegan Paul. 1973. ISBN 0710077572. OL 24219110M.
- The Age of Madness: A History of Involuntary Mental Hospitalization Presented in Selected Texts (editor). London: Routledge & Kegan Paul Ltd. 1975 [1973]. ISBN 978-0710079930.
- Ceremonial Chemistry: The Ritual Persecution of Drugs, Addicts, and Pushers. Syracuse, New York: Syracuse University Press. 2003 [1974]. ISBN 0815607687. OL 8049134M.
- Schizophrenia: The Sacred Symbol of Psychiatry. Syracuse, New York: Syracuse University Press. 1988 [1976]. ISBN 978-0815602248.
- Anti-Freud: Karl Kraus and His Criticism of Psychoanalysis and Psychiatry. Syracuse, New York: Syracuse University Press. 1990 [1976]. ISBN 978-0815602477. (First published in 1976 under the name: Karl Kraus and the Soul-Doctors: A Pioneer Critic and His Criticism of Psychiatry and Psychoanalysis – Louisiana State University Press, 1976.)
- Heresies. Doubleday Anchor. 1976. ISBN 978-0385111621.
- The Theology of Medicine: The Political-Philosophical Foundations of Medical Ethics. Syracuse, New York: Syracuse University Press. 1988 [1977]. ISBN 978-0815602255.
- Psychiatric Slavery. Syracuse, New York: Syracuse University Press. 1977. ISBN 978-0815605119.
- The Myth of Psychotherapy: Mental Healing as Religion, Rhetoric, and Repression. Syracuse, New York: Syracuse University Press. 1988 [1978]. ISBN 978-0815602231.
- Sex by Prescription: The Startling Truth about Today's Sex Therapy. Syracuse, New York: Syracuse University Press. 1990 [1980]. ISBN 978-0815602507.
- The Therapeutic State: Psychiatry in the Mirror of Current Events. Buffalo NY: Prometheus Books. 1984. ISBN 978-0879752392.
- Insanity: The Idea and Its Consequences. Syracuse, New York: Syracuse University Press. 1997 [1987]. ISBN 978-0815604600.
- The Untamed Tongue: A Dissenting Dictionary. Lasalle, IL: Open Court. 1990. ISBN 978-0812691030.
- Our Right to Drugs: The Case for a Free Market. Syracuse, New York: Syracuse University Press. 1996 [1992]. ISBN 978-0815603337.
- A Lexicon of Lunacy: Metaphoric Malady, Moral Responsibility, and Psychiatry. New Brunswick, New Jersey: Transaction Publishers. 2003 [1993]. ISBN 978-1560000655.
- Cruel Compassion: Psychiatric Control of Society's Unwanted. Syracuse, New York: Syracuse University Press. 1998 [1994]. ISBN 978-0815605102.
- The Meaning of Mind: Language, Morality, and Neuroscience. Westport CT: Praeger Publishers. 1996. ISBN 978-0275956035.
- Fatal Freedom: The Ethics and Politics of Suicide. Westport CT: Praeger Publishers. 1999. ISBN 978-0275966461.
- Pharmacracy: Medicine and Politics in America. Westport CT: Praeger Publishers. 2001. ISBN 978-0275971960.
- Liberation by Oppression: A Comparative Study of Slavery and Psychiatry. New Brunswick, New Jersey: Transaction Publishers. 2002. ISBN 978-0765801456.
- Faith in Freedom: Libertarian Principles and Psychiatric Practices. New Brunswick, New Jersey: Transaction Publishers. 2004. ISBN 978-0765802446.
- Words to the Wise: A Medical-Philosophical Dictionary. New Brunswick, New Jersey: Transaction Publishers. 2004. ISBN 978-0765802170.
- My Madness Saved Me: The Madness and Marriage of Virginia Woolf. New Brunswick, New Jersey: Transaction Publishers. 2006. ISBN 978-0765803214.
- Coercion as Cure: A Critical History of Psychiatry. New Brunswick, New Jersey: Transaction Publishers. 2007. ISBN 978-0765803795.
- The Medicalization of Everyday Life: Selected Essays. Syracuse, New York: Syracuse University Press. 2007. ISBN 978-0815608677.
- Psychiatry: The Science of Lies. Syracuse, New York: Syracuse University Press. 2008. ISBN 978-0815609100.
- Antipsychiatry: Quackery Squared. Syracuse, New York: Syracuse University Press. 2009. ISBN 978-0815609438.
- Suicide Prohibition: The Shame of Medicine. Syracuse, New York: Syracuse University Press. 2011. ISBN 978-0815609902.
- Nurbakhsh, Javad; Szasz, Thomas; Jahangiri, Hamideh (2019). Handbook of Psychiatry volume 1. Germany: Lap Lambert. ISBN 978-3330346376.

=== Selected scholarly papers ===
- Szasz, T. (September 3, 1988). "Koryagin and psychiatric coercion". The Lancet. 332 (8610): 573. doi:10.1016/S0140-6736(88)92700-6. PMID 2900959. S2CID 5176787.
- Szasz, T. (December 28, 1991). "Diagnoses are not diseases". The Lancet. 338 (8782–8783): 1574–1576. doi:10.1016/0140-6736(91)92387-H. PMID 1683983. S2CID 35351783.
- Szasz, Thomas (June 1993). "Curing, coercing, and claims-making: a reply to critics". The British Journal of Psychiatry. 162 (6): 797–800. doi:10.1192/bjp.162.6.797. PMID 8330111. S2CID 2282452.
- Szasz, Thomas (June 2008). "Debunking antipsychiatry: Laing, law, and Largactil". Current Psychology. 27 (2): 79–101. doi:10.1007/s12144-008-9024-z. S2CID 145618728.
- Szasz, Thomas S. (August 1975). "Medical metaphorology". American Psychologist. 30 (8): 859–8561. doi:10.1037/0003-066X.30.8.859.
- Szasz, T. S. (October 1975). "The danger of coercive psychiatry". American Bar Association Journal. 61: 1246–1248. PMID 11664493.
- Szasz, Thomas S. (May–June 1981). "Power and psychiatry". Society. 18 (4): 16–18. doi:10.1007/BF02701339. S2CID 143684254.
- Szasz, Thomas (March–April 2004). "Protecting patients against psychiatric intervention". Society. 41 (3): 7–9. doi:10.1007/BF02690175. S2CID 144199897.
- Szasz, Thomas (July–August 2004). "Pharmacracy in America". Society. 41 (5): 54–58. doi:10.1007/BF02688218. S2CID 145162903.
- Szasz, Thomas (1978). "The Concept of Mental Illness: Explanation or Justification?". In Engelhardt, Tristam; Spicker, Stuart (eds.). Mental Health: Philosophical Perspectives. Philosophy and Medicine. Vol. 4. Springer Netherlands. pp. 235–250. doi:10.1007/978-94-015-6909-5_17. ISBN 978-9401569118.
- Szasz, Thomas (May–June 1994). "Mental illness is still a myth". Society. 31 (4): 34–39. doi:10.1007/BF02693245. S2CID 145520286.
- Szasz, Thomas (September 2012). "Varieties of psychiatric criticism" (PDF). History of Psychiatry. 23 (3): 349–355. CiteSeerX 10.1.1.674.8694. doi:10.1177/0957154X12450236. S2CID 143972152.
- Szasz, Thomas (Spring 1998). "The healing word: its past, present, and future". Journal of Humanistic Psychology. 38 (2): 8–20. doi:10.1177/00221678980382002. S2CID 144504646.
- Szasz T (September 1994). "Psychiatric diagnosis, psychiatric power and psychiatric abuse". Journal of Medical Ethics. 20 (3): 135–138. doi:10.1136/jme.20.3.135. PMC 1376496. PMID 7996558.
- Szasz, T. (February 2003). "The cure of souls in the therapeutic state". The Psychoanalytic Review. 90 (1): 45–62. doi:10.1521/prev.90.1.45.22089. PMID 12898787.
- Szasz, Thomas (April 27, 2011). "The myth of mental illness: 50 years later". The Psychiatrist. 35 (5): 179–182. doi:10.1192/pb.bp.110.031310.
- Szasz T (August 2003). "Psychiatry and the control of dangerousness: on the apotropaic function of the term "mental illness"". Journal of Medical Ethics. 29 (4): 227–230. doi:10.1136/jme.29.4.227. PMC 1733760. PMID 12930856.
- Szasz T. (April 25, 2006). "Secular humanism and "scientific psychiatry"". Philosophy, Ethics, and Humanities in Medicine. 1 (1): E5. doi:10.1186/1747-5341-1-5. PMC 1483825. PMID 16759353.
- "Law and psychiatry: The problems that will not go away". Journal of Mind and Behavior. 11 (3–4): 557–563. 1990.
- "Soviet psychiatry: the historical background". Inquiry: 4–5. December 5, 1977.
- "Soviet psychiatry: its supporters in the West". Inquiry: 4–5. January 2, 1978.
- "Soviet psychiatry: winking at psychiatric terror". Inquiry: 3–4. February 6, 1987.
- "The therapeutic state: the tyranny of pharmacracy" (PDF). The Independent Review. V (4): 485–521. Spring 2001. ISSN 1086-1653.
- Szasz, T. (March 1993). "Crazy talk: Thought disorder or psychiatric arrogance?". British Journal of Medical Psychology. 66 (4): 61–67. doi:10.1111/j.2044-8341.1993.tb01726.x. PMID 8485078.
- "Psychiatry, anti-psychiatry, critical psychiatry: what do these terms mean?". Philosophy, Psychiatry, & Psychology. 17 (3): 229–232. September 2010.

== See also ==
- Controversies about psychiatry
- Wrongful involuntary commitment
- Scientology front groups
