= Deinstitutionalization in the United States =

Replacement of psychiatric hospitals in the United States

The United States has experienced two waves of deinstitutionalization, the process of replacing long-stay psychiatric hospitals with less isolated community mental health services for those diagnosed with a mental disorder or developmental disability.

The first wave began in the 1950s and targeted people with mental illness. The second wave began roughly 15 years later and focused on individuals who had been diagnosed with a developmental disability. Deinstitutionalization continues today, though the movements are growing smaller as fewer people are sent to institutions.

Numerous social forces led to a move for deinstitutionalization; researchers generally give credit to six main factors: criticisms of public mental hospitals, incorporation of mind-altering drugs in treatment, support from President Kennedy for federal policy changes, shifts to community-based care, changes in public perception, and individual states' desires to reduce costs from mental hospitals.

== Criticisms of public mental hospitals ==
The public's awareness of conditions in mental institutions began to increase during World War II. Conscientious objectors (COs) of the war were assigned to alternative positions which suffered from manpower shortages. Around 2,000 COs were assigned to work in understaffed mental institutions. In 1946, an exposé in Life magazine detailed the shortfalls of many mental health facilities. This exposé was one of the first featured articles about the quality of mental institutions.

Following WWII, articles and exposés about the mental hospital conditions bombarded popular and scholarly magazines and periodicals. The COs from the 1946 Life exposé formed the National Mental Health Foundation, which raised public support and successfully convinced states to increase funding for mental institutions. Five years later, the National Mental Health Foundation merged with the Hygiene and Psychiatric Foundation to form the National Association of Mental Health.

During WWII, it was found that 1 out of 8 men considered for military service was rejected based on a neurological or psychiatric problem. This increased awareness of the prevalence of mental illnesses, and people began to realize the costs associated with admission to mental institutions (i.e. cost of lost productivity and of mental health services).

Since numerous individuals suffering from mental illness had served in the military, many began to believe that more knowledge about mental illness and better services would not only benefit those who served but also national security as a whole. Congress passed the National Mental Health Act of 1946, which created the National Institute of Mental Health (NIMH). NIMH was pivotal in funding research for the developing mental health field.

In New York ARC v. Rockefeller, parents of 5,000 residents at the Willowbrook State School in Staten Island, New York, filed suit over the inhumane living conditions at that institution, where residents were abused and neglected. A 1972 television broadcast from the Willowbrook State School, titled "Willowbrook: The Last Great Disgrace", outraged the general public. However, it took three years from the time the lawsuit documents were filed before the consent judgement was signed. In 1975, the consent judgement was signed, and it committed New York state to improve community placement for the now designated "Willowbrook Class". The Willowbrook State School was closed in 1987, and all but about 150 of the former Willowbrook residents were moved to group homes by 1992.

In 1973, a federal district court ruled in Souder v. Brennan that patients in mental health institutions must be considered employees and paid the minimum wage required by the Fair Labor Standards Act of 1938 whenever they performed any activity that conferred an economic benefit on an institution. Following this ruling, institutional peonage was outlawed, as evidenced in Pennsylvania's Institutional Peonage Abolishment Act of 1973.

Rosenhan's experiment in 1973 "accelerated the movement to reform mental institutions and to deinstitutionalize as many mental patients as possible."

== Alternatives ==
=== Pharmacotherapy ===
During the 1950s, new drugs became available and were incorporated into treatment for the mentally ill. The new drugs effectively reduced severe symptoms, allowing the mentally ill to live in environments less stringent than institutions, such as halfway houses, nursing homes, or their own homes. Drug therapy also allowed many mentally ill to obtain employment.

=== Shift to community-based care ===
In general, professionals, civil rights leaders, and humanitarians saw the shift from institutional confinement to local care as the appropriate approach. The deinstitutionalization movement started off slowly but gained momentum as it adopted philosophies from the Civil Rights Movement. During the 1960s, deinstitutionalization increased dramatically, and the average length of stay within mental institutions decreased by more than half. Many patients began to be placed in community care facilities instead of long-term care institutions.

==== Partial hospitalization ====
A successful community-based alternative to institutionalization or inpatient hospitalization is partial hospitalization. Partial hospitalization programs are typically offered by hospitals, and they provide less than 24 hours per day treatment in which patients commute to the hospital or treatment center up to seven days a week and reside in their normal residences when not attending the program. Patients in partial hospitalization programs show the same or greater levels of improvement as their inpatient counterparts, and unlike inpatient hospitalization, these individuals are able to maintain their familial and social roles during treatment. Partial hospitalization allows for a smoother and less expensive transition between inpatient hospitalization and community life. Some patients are able to avoid inpatient hospitalization altogether by participating in a partial hospitalization program, and many are able to shorten the length of their inpatient hospitalization by participating in a partial hospitalization program. By eliminating or reducing the length of inpatient hospital stays, diversion to partial hospitalization programs is one important component to the process of deinstitutionalization in the United States.

==== Intensive outpatient programs ====
Intensive outpatient programs are a crucial component of the community-based care that has replaced inpatient hospitalization and institutionalization in many cases. Intensive outpatient programs provide a more cost-effective outpatient alternative to inpatient hospitalization that allows patients to receive intensive psychiatric care while still remaining in their communities, going to school, or holding a job. These programs combine psychotherapy with pharmacotherapy, group therapy, substance abuse counseling, and related services in a very structured and time-intensive format, typically three hours a day, three days a week, but up to five days a week. They are a less time-intensive step down from partial hospitalization, but they can provide greater support than weekly therapy appointments alone. IOPs can serve as a transition between inpatient hospitalization and less intensive weekly therapy when a patient requires a greater level of care. Diversion into intensive outpatient programs has reduced the number of individuals in institutionalized settings.

== President Kennedy ==
In 1955, the Joint Commission on Mental Health and Health was authorized to investigate problems related to the mentally ill. President John F. Kennedy had a special interest in the issue of mental health because his sister, Rosemary, had been lobotomized at the age of 23 at the request of her father. Shortly after his inauguration, Kennedy appointed a special President's Panel of Mental Retardation. The panel included professionals and leaders of the organization. In 1962, the panel published a report with 112 recommendations to better serve the mentally ill.

In conjunction with the Joint Commission on Mental Health and Health, the Presidential Panel of Mental Retardation, and Kennedy's influence, two important pieces of legislation were passed in 1963: the Maternal and Child Health and Mental Retardation Planning Amendments, which increased funding for research on the prevention of retardation, and the Community Mental Health Act, which provided funding for community facilities that served people with mental disabilities. Both acts furthered the process of deinstitutionalization. However, less than a month after signing the new legislation, JFK was assassinated and could not see the plan through. The community mental health centers never received stable funding, and even 15 years later less than half the promised centers were built.

== Changing public opinion ==
While public opinion of the mentally ill has improved somewhat, it is still often stigmatized. Advocacy movements in support of mental health have emerged. These movements focus on reducing stigma and discrimination and increasing support groups and awareness. The consumer or ex-patient movement, began as protests in the 1970s, forming groups such as Liberation of Mental Patients, Project Release, Insane Liberation Front, and the National Alliance on Mental Illness (NAMI).

Many of the participants consisted of ex-patients of mental institutions who felt the need to challenge the system's treatment of the mentally ill. Initially, this movement targeted issues surrounding involuntary commitment, use of electroconvulsive therapy, anti-psychotic medication, and coercive psychiatry. Many of these advocacy groups were successful in the judiciary system. In 1975, the United States Court of Appeals for the First Circuit ruled in favor of the Mental Patient's Liberation Front of Rogers v. Okin, establishing the right of a patient to refuse treatment.

A 1975 award-winning film, One Flew Over the Cuckoo's Nest, sent a message regarding the rights of those committed involuntarily. That same year, the U.S. Supreme Court restricted the rights of states to incarcerate someone who was not violent. This was followed up with a 1978 ruling further restricting states from confining anyone involuntarily for mental illness.

NAMI successfully lobbied to improve mental health services and gain equality of insurance coverage for mental illnesses. In 1996, the Mental Health Parity Act was enacted into law, realizing the mental health movement's goal of equal insurance coverage.

In 1955, there were 340 psychiatric hospital beds for every 100,000 US citizens. In 2005, that number had diminished to 17 per 100,000.

== Reducing costs ==
As hospitalization costs increased, both the federal and state governments were motivated to find less expensive alternatives to hospitalization. The 1965 amendments to Social Security shifted about 50% of the mental health care costs from states to the federal government, motivating the government to promote deinstitutionalization.

Deinstitutionalization began in 1955 with the widespread introduction of chlorpromazine, commonly known as Thorazine, the first effective antipsychotic medication, and received a major impetus 10 years later with the enactment of federal Medicaid and Medicare. Specifically, a provision of Medicaid largely prohibited reimbursement to states for mental illness treatment in facilities that had more than sixteen beds. This clause incentivized states to close their larger mental hospitals and offer treatment in a community out-patient setting, which was 50% reimbursable under Medicaid.

In 1955, there were 558,239 severely mentally ill patients in the nation's public psychiatric hospitals. By 1965, the number had declined to approximately 500,000, after which it dropped rapidly, reaching approximately 100,000 by the early 1980's. The rate of decrease slowed thereafter, reaching 71,619 in 1994 and 62,532 by 2014.

The increase in homelessness was seen as related to deinstitutionalization. Studies from the late 1980s indicated that one-third to one-half of homeless people had severe psychiatric disorders, often co-occurring with substance abuse.

A process of indirect cost-shifting may have led to a form of "re-institutionalization" through the increased use of jail detention for those with mental disorders deemed unmanageable and noncompliant. When laws were enacted requiring communities to take more responsibility for mental health care, necessary funding was often absent, and jail became the default option, being cheaper than psychiatric care. In 1960, 55,362 individuals with serious mental illness were incarcerated in state and federal prisons. By 2014, that number was 392,037.

In summer 2009, author and columnist Heather Mac Donald stated in City Journal, "jails have become society's primary mental institutions, though few have the funding or expertise to carry out that role properly ... at Rikers, 28 percent of the inmates require mental health services, a number that rises each year."

== See also ==
- Mentally ill people in United States jails and prisons
- Involuntary hospitalization of Joyce Patricia Brown
