= Involuntary hospitalization of Joyce Brown =

1987 committal in New York

Brown being released from Bellevue in 1988.

Joyce Patricia Brown (September 7, 1947 – November 29, 2005), also known as Billie Boggs, was a homeless woman who was forcibly hospitalized in New York City in 1987. She was the first person hospitalized under a Mayor Ed Koch administration program which expanded the city's ability to forcibly commit homeless New Yorkers to psychiatric hospitals. Between 1987 and 1988, Brown worked with the New York Civil Liberties Union to challenge her hospitalization in a case which attracted significant media attention. During the ensuing trial, her lawyers argued that her behaviors were not in line with social expectations but did not rise to the level of posing a danger to herself or others. Brown took the stand, and her clarity while testifying became part of the public conversation. The trial ended in her favor, and while the city won on appeal, she was ultimately released after a subsequent case determined that the city could not forcibly medicate her. Following her release, she made several television appearances and spoke about homelessness at Harvard Law School, but came to avoid the press. Her case sparked national conversations about how best to care for people with mental illnesses.

== Background ==
The 1975 Supreme Court decision O'Connor v. Donaldson limited involuntary psychiatric hospitalization to those who posed a danger to themselves or others. Many states passed legislation following the ruling, including New York, which passed its Mental Hygiene Law in 1978, allowing involuntary hospitalization of people with mental illness if they were considered a danger to themselves or others. The case was one part of a larger trend of deinstitutionalization in the United States, which began in the late 1950s and resulted in the release of hundreds of thousands of people from psychiatric hospitals. These changes, along with inadequate social programs, housing policies, and broader economic conditions contributed to an increase in homelessness in parts of the United States.

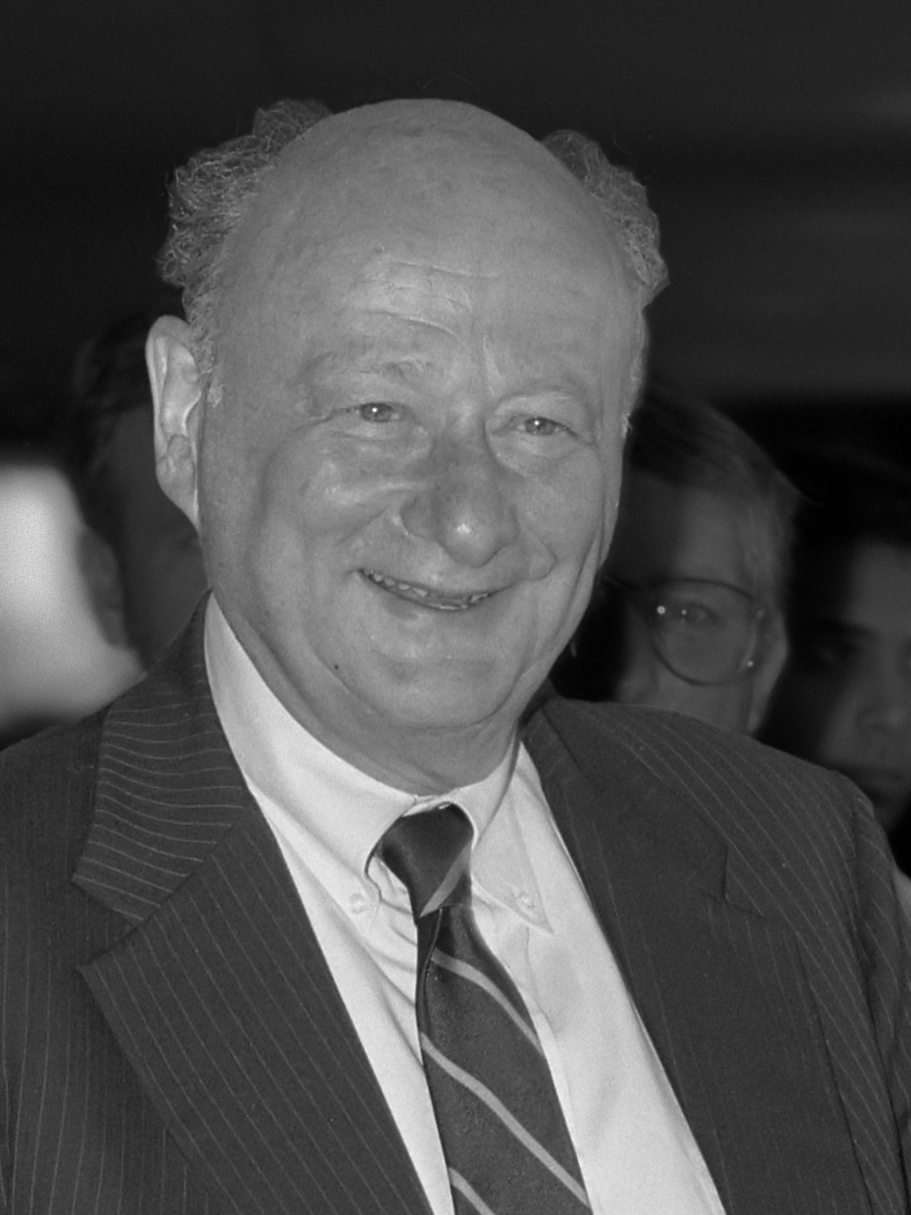
New York City Mayor Ed Koch in 1988

In New York City, Mayor Ed Koch established Project HELP (Homeless Emergency Liaison Project) in 1982 to provide food, clothing, medical, and psychiatric services to homeless people in Manhattan. Sometimes staff would bring people to psychiatric hospitals but most were not admitted because they did not fit the legal requirements. Koch was frustrated that so many of the people his staff determined needed hospitalization were not being treated due to the typical interpretation of New York law, so he began exploring ways to interpret the legal language differently. He was advised that case law could support a reinterpretation of the Mental Hygiene Law's requirement that someone be a "danger to themselves or others" to include a consideration of whether people's behaviors, including self-neglect, might pose a danger to themselves or others in the future, even if there was no immediate danger. While considering these changes, Koch met with people who would be affected by this change, including Brown, who would later become one of the first people involuntarily committed due to Koch's reinterpretation. On October 28, 1987, Koch announced a new program for removing homeless people with mental illness from the streets for reasons including self-neglect and future harm, using his new legal interpretation, allocating a 28-bed unit at Bellevue Hospital to take care of newly admissible patients. Project HELP's psychiatrists could then direct police officers to take people to a hospital, although involuntary hospitalization remained contingent upon not just Project HELP's doctors but also an emergency room psychiatrist and a psychiatrist at the inpatient facility agreeing that the patient met the criteria.

The New York Civil Liberties Union (NYCLU, the New York affiliate of the American Civil Liberties Union) firmly opposed Koch's program, criticizing it as a violation of the civil rights of mentally ill and homeless people. They argued that the Koch program attempted to hide homeless people, rather than help them through housing assistance and mental health clinics. Following Koch's announcement, NYCLU volunteers distributed fliers to people living on the street detailing their rights and advising them to contact the organization if they were involuntarily committed.

== Life prior to hospitalization ==
Joyce Patricia Brown was born in 1947, to a working-class family in Elizabeth, New Jersey. She was the youngest of six children, with four sisters and one brother. She worked as a secretary after graduating from high school, including for the city of Elizabeth. She struggled with several forms of substance abuse, and became addicted to both heroin and cocaine in the years after graduating. She began to hear voices and act erratically, resulting in her dismissal from her secretary job, and was later convicted of possession of heroin. In 1982, she was charged with assaulting a police officer at Newark Penn Station. She lived with her parents until 1977 and with her sisters in the mid-1980s, moving between their houses as tensions arose. They eventually pooled their money to get her a place of her own instead, but she was soon living in a homeless shelter.

In 1985, after being ejected from a shelter in Newark, her sisters took her to East Orange General Hospital for a psychiatric evaluation. She was hospitalized for fifteen days, diagnosed with a form of psychosis likely caused by schizophrenia, and prescribed Thorazine, which she did not take. She lived on disability benefits, alternating between living in shelters and at one of her sisters' houses. In May 1986, after an argument with her sisters, she left home for Manhattan, and her family did not see her again until she appeared on the news years later.

Brown took up residence on an air vent near Second Avenue at 65th Street by a Swensen's Ice Cream shop. She spent about a year there, during which time she was approached by Project HELP workers but refused their aid. They began monitoring her in December 1986 following concerned reports from people in the community. They checked in regularly, and were concerned about her ability to take care of herself, especially given her inadequate clothing during the cold winter. She was taken to psychiatric hospitals at Project HELP's recommendation three times in 1986 and 1987, each time diagnosed with schizophrenia but released upon determination that she did not pose a danger to herself or others. She was known to people in the neighborhood for alleged behaviors like running into traffic, exposing herself to passersby, threatening and screaming at people (especially black men), tearing up and urinating on money she was given, and defecating on the sidewalk. Neighbors described having conversations with her which were frequently pleasant but could also quickly veer into aggression. On October 28, 1987, she became the first person involuntarily committed under Koch's newly relaxed requirements.

== Hospitalization and trial ==
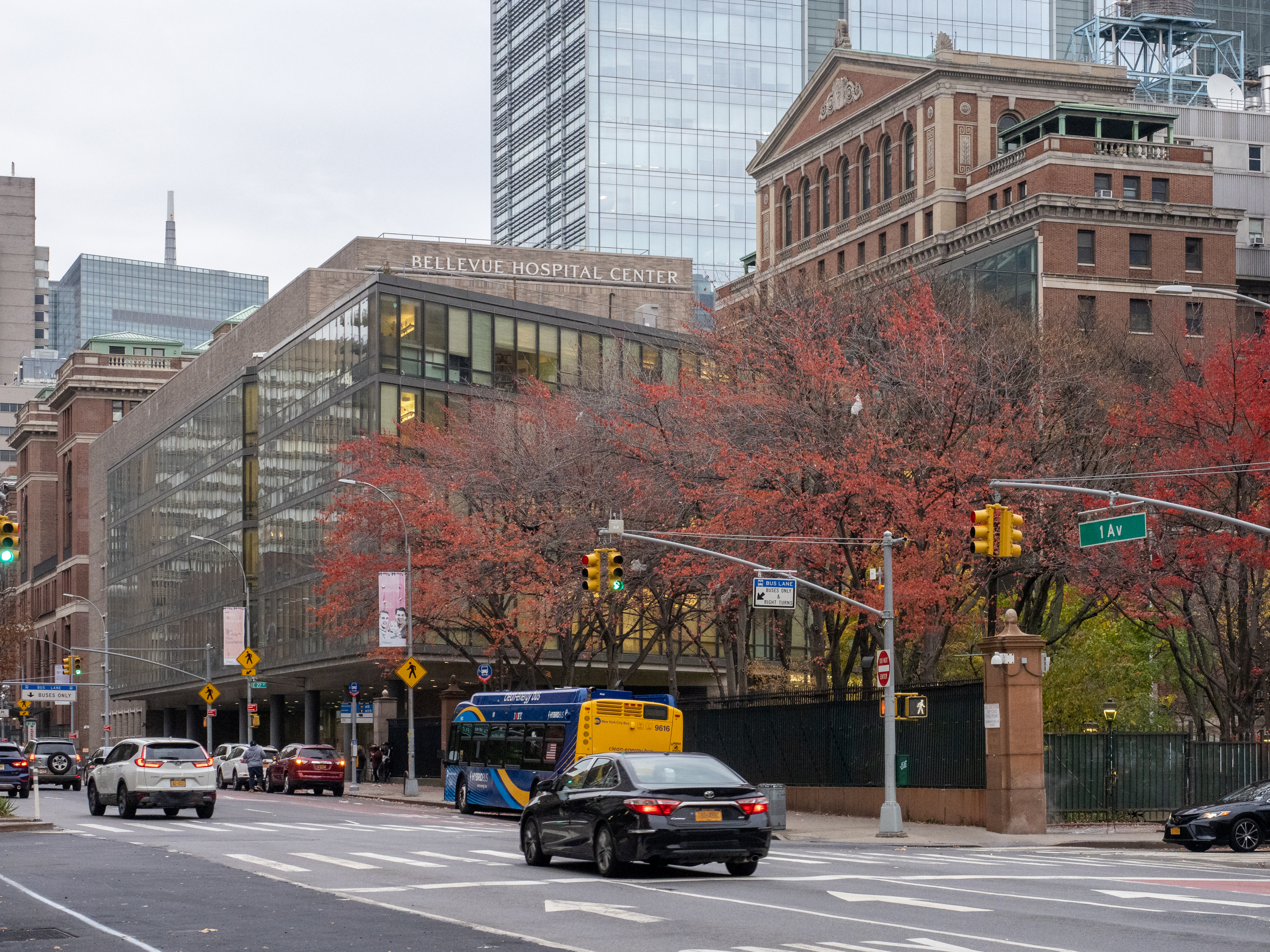
Bellevue Hospital

Brown was taken to Bellevue Hospital on the first day of Koch's program, where she gave false names she had used in the past, including "Ann Smith" and "Billie Boggs". The name Billie Boggs was based on Bill Boggs, a former local television talk show host in New York City whom Brown had developed an obsession for years beforehand, and it was that name which was widely published in news stories about her case. Doctors at Bellevue diagnosed her with paranoid schizophrenia and injected with the anti-psychotic drug Haldol and a tranquilizer, Ativan. The next day, Brown contacted the NYCLU; staff attorney Robert Levy and Executive Director Norman Siegel took Brown's case. From the start, the case generated extensive media attention. Brown's sisters, who had been looking for her since she left home, went to Bellevue after recognizing court sketches of her in the news. They spoke to the media, requesting anonymity, urging compassion for the families of homeless people and recommending that Brown be committed to a hospital.

A trial at Bellevue commenced on November 2, 1988, with Acting Supreme Court Justice Robert Lippmann presiding. Levy argued that there was insufficient evidence that Brown was severely mentally ill, and that the behaviors she exhibited may not have been normal or in line with social expectations but did not meet the requirement set by O'Connor v. Donaldson for posing a danger to oneself or others. Levy reframed the actions that had been offered as evidence of her mental illness as things that lots of people do without being called mentally ill, like urinating where it is convenient or making a social or political statement by burning money. He called Robert Gould of New York Medical College to testify that Brown's judgment was limited, but that she was not severely mentally ill. The city's lawyer, supported by four psychiatrists with Project HELP and Bellevue, argued that Brown's mental illness posed a significant risk to herself in that she exhibited suicidal behavior, was antagonistic to the point of provoking violence, and did not wear adequate clothing to survive harsh New York City winters. One of Brown's sisters wanted to testify that she needed to be hospitalized, but the scope of her testimony was limited after objections by Levy that someone who has not seen Brown in years could not speak to her current state.

Brown testified that she lived on the street because she preferred it to a shelter, that what was characterized as talking to herself was actually singing to herself, and that she gave false names to avoid her sisters. She said that she used the sidewalk as a restroom because she was not permitted to use indoor restrooms, and she tore up money she was given because she did not want to be mugged for it. She described herself as a "professional" homeless person and argued that she should be released. Her clarity and lucidity on the stand shifted the public conversation over her hospitalization. Koch argued that the extent to which Brown was able to clearly present her case was evidence of the effectiveness of the city's treatment. On November 12, 1988, Judge Lippmann ruled in her favor, granting her release. Lippmann explained that he based his ruling primarily off of Brown's testimony and demeanor, as the psychiatrists' testimonies differed so significantly from each other that they were largely unhelpful. He ultimately determined that regardless of her mental health, "she is not unable to care for her essential needs".

The Koch administration quickly appealed the decision, and the Appellate Division of the State Supreme Court granted a stay of proceedings, delaying Brown's release. Brown remained adamant in refusing all care at Bellevue. Lippmann's decision was overruled on appeal, with the court stating that he should have given more weight to the psychiatrists treating her and less to the NYCLU psychiatrists that only evaluated her in a "structured, safe environment". The appeal was granted on a vote of 3–2. The dissenting justices argued that the potential harm Brown posed to herself was too speculative to deprive her of rights. The NYCLU filed an appeal. The city tried to have the hospital force her to take medication, leading to another State Supreme Court hearing. An independent psychologist, Francine Cournos, testified that Brown had either schizophrenia or manic depression (now called bipolar disorder) and could benefit from medication, but not if it had to be forced as that may lead her to reject all mental health care. On January 15, 1988, State Supreme Court Justice Irving Kirshenbaum agreed with Cournos and ruled that New York City could not forcibly medicate Brown. Unable to provide medication, the city released her from Bellevue on January 19, 1988, after 84 days. Lawyers for the city and NYCLU alike hoped the State Court of Appeals would better define dangerousness in the context of involuntary hospitalization, but the court declined to rule since Brown's release made it no longer necessary.

== Post-release ==
Upon Brown's release, Rick Hampson of the Associated Press called her "the most famous homeless person in America". Her release was a major media event. The night of her release, she appeared on the 5:00 p.m. broadcast on WNBC, the 6:00 p.m. broadcast on WCBS, and the 10:00 p.m. broadcast of WNYW. In all of the interviews, she expressed that she was homeless, not mentally ill, and that she was being held as a "political prisoner". During the WNYW interview, anchorman John Roland, who lived in the same neighborhood as Brown, became aggressive and challenged her self-characterization, calling her "a mess" and "a disaster". Negative feedback from viewers led to an apology and five-day suspension, itself leading to negative feedback defending Roland. Among his defenders were Koch and Elizabeth Mayor Thomas Dunn, who accused the news programs and NYCLU lawyers of exploitation.

Brown's lawyers secured a space for her at the Traveler's Hotel, a home for formerly homeless women, and arranged for continued psychiatric care. She received donations during her case and continued to make appearances on television news and talk shows. She was interviewed on 60 Minutes, Donahue, WCBS's People Are Talking, and WABC's The Morning Show. A month later, she spoke at a Harvard Law School event called "The Homeless Crisis: A Street View". She received offers about books and movies, as well as job offers. When US President Ronald Reagan met with Soviet leader Mikhail Gorbachev for the March 1988 Moscow Summit, he brought up Brown's case as an example of American civil rights when criticizing the USSR's detention of political dissidents under the guise of treating mental illness.

Two weeks after the Harvard event, Brown was seen panhandling. A 1988 New York magazine feature on Brown noted that people would frequently recognize her and call out to her, to which she would sometimes respond politely, and sometimes aggressively. That year, she spent a lot of her time at the Port Authority Bus Terminal, was hospitalized two more times, and arrested for possession of heroin. Her release from jail was conditioned on psychiatric treatment.

In 1991, she moved into a supervised group home, not taking psychiatric medication, and living on disability benefits. She avoided the press, and attempts by reporters to speak with her caused her distress. The director of the agency that operates her group home and one of Brown's psychiatrists told the Associated Press that the media attention surrounding her case was likely harmful in the long run.

Joyce Brown died at the age of 58, on November 29, 2005.

== Legacy ==
Jeanie Kasindorf of New York compared Brown's case to that of Bernhard Goetz and the 1984 subway shooting in the extent to which it polarized the city. Some New Yorkers felt the government did not have the right to tell someone they could not live on the street or had to medicate themselves against their will; others argued that someone with severe, untreated mental illness could not be relied upon to make good decisions for themselves and that other residents should not have to contend with the kinds of behaviors Brown exhibited.

Writing in the ABA Journal, Alan Pusey stated that Brown's case sparked national discussion over whether forced hospitalization policies actually help the mentally ill or simply remove them from the eye of the public. In an article for the Journal of Psychosocial Nursing & Mental Health Services, Alexander Brooks wrote that the case stands in for larger debates over how societies should care for and contend with challenges presented by people with mental illness, with various parties advocating for institutionalization, deinstitutionalization, and bolstering of resources like housing and health care. According to Brooks, "what is needed...is fewer showcase litigations and more effort made to address the compelling needs of the chronic mentally ill". Luis R. Marcos wrote that Brown's case "exemplifies the politics of implementing controversial public mental health policy and the role the news media can play in the process". In analyzing the initial case in which Brown testified, Marcos also emphasized "the critical role that denial plays in mental illness" whereby "serious mental illness is often characterized by the patient's denial of its existence".

After Mayor Eric Adams announced a compulsory hospitalization program in 2022, comparisons were drawn to Brown's case. Adams' policy relies on a similar legal interpretations as Koch's, expanding the circumstances when someone can be forcibly moved to a hospital to when someone appears mentally ill and exhibits "an inability to meet basic living needs, even when no recent dangerous act has been observed".
