= Cournos =

Cournos is a surname. Notable people with the surname include:

- John Cournos (1881–1966), Russian-born translator
- Francine Cournos (born 1945), American psychiatrist and HIV/AIDS researcher
