= Rennie v. Klein =

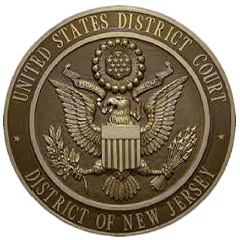
- Court: United States District Court for the District of New Jersey
- Full case name: John E. Rennie v. Ann Klein, Commissioner of Human Services, Michail Rotov, Director, Division of Mental Health and Hospitals, Richard Wilson, Chief Executive Officer of Ancora Psychiatric Hospital, Max Pepernik, Acting Medical Director of Ancora Psychiatric Hospital, Edward Wallace, Assistant Administrator of Ancora Psychiatric Hospital, and Josefina Bugaoan, Assistant Medical Director of Ancora Psychiatric Hospital
- Decided: November 9, 1978
- Docket nos.: Civ. A. No. 77-2624
- Citation: 462 F. Supp. 1131

Case history
- Subsequent actions: Motion for preliminary injunction denied, December 12, 1978.

Court membership
- Judge sitting: Stanley Brotman

Rennie v. Klein, 462 F. Supp. 1131 (D.N.J. 1978), was a case heard in the United States District Court for the District of New Jersey in 1978 to decide whether an involuntarily committed mental patient has a constitutional right to refuse psychiatric medication. It was the first case to establish that such a patient has the right to refuse medication in the United States.

== Circumstances ==
John Rennie, age 38, was a former pilot and flight instructor who was a patient at Ancora Psychiatric Hospital in Winslow Township, New Jersey. His case was brought in December 1977. Rennie's psychiatric history indicates that he did not show signs of mental illness until he was 31. He was first hospitalized in 1973, and subsequently he was discharged and re-admitted many times, primarily, as trial judge Stanley Brotman noted, because of "his failure to continue taking medications after he has left the hospital's custody." He had been given various diagnoses over time including paranoid schizophrenia and manic-depressive psychosis. Rennie had persistent religious delusions (he thought he was Christ) and suicidal ideation. His eighth hospitalization was initiated after he threatened to kill President Ford. On subsequent hospitalizations he became increasingly abusive and assaultive.

In December 1977, during his twelfth hospitalization that began on August 10, 1976, doctors had unsuccessfully tried various psychiatric medications. Rennie sued in federal district court to prevent the hospital from administering psychotropic medications to him without a clear emergency. His counsel was the Office of the Public Advocate. As Judge Brotman describes in his decision, the precipitating factors occurred earlier in the month when Rennie had become homicidal. Hospital staff felt his condition was deteriorating; to prevent Rennie from harming other patients, staff, and himself, the treatment team administered prolixin decanoate, an injectable long-acting drug, because of his history of failing to take medication once released. They believed the drug would be the easiest drug on which to maintain him after release. Following initiation of the prolixin regime, Rennie's condition did improve markedly.

Judge Brotman responded to Rennie's appeal for an injunction by issuing a compromise ruling. Rather than enjoining the hospital from giving him any medication, he insisted that the prolixin be lowered to a minimum maintenance dosage, which staff psychiatrists considered too low. He then conducted fourteen days of hearings between January 13 and April 28, 1978.

Several months after issuing his initial ruling that asserted a right to refuse treatment grounded in a constitutional right to privacy, Judge Brotman made the case into a class action that included all involuntarily committed patients at the five mental health facilities operated by the state of New Jersey, and held an additional seventeen days of hearings.

== Decision ==
An involuntarily committed patient who has not been found incompetent, barring an emergency, has a qualified right to refuse psychotropic medication, especially when forced treatment violates his First Amendment rights to freedom of speech or to practice his religion, or his Eighth Amendment rights to be free of cruel and unusual punishment. New Jersey's administrative policies, which provide for a second psychiatric opinion in the case of refusing patients, must give adequate scope for the exercise of that right to satisfy constitutional requirements. Additionally, due process must be followed in order to forcibly medicate an individual against his will. Judge Brotman's order that the least restrictive alternative concept applied to choice of medications was upheld upon appeal.

== Significance ==
Before this case, although attention had been focused on involuntary commitment standards, it was assumed that once the patient was hospitalized, hospitals could administer psychoactive medication without consulting either the patient or the family. This was the first case in which the focus shifted from standards of commitment to standards of treatment once hospitalized. This was the first of a series of cases that increasingly acknowledged patient rights to refuse treatment and right to least restrictive treatment by way of a variety of First Amendment rights including freedom of religion and thought as well as the ultimate right to privacy, control over one's own body.

However, as this case illustrates, applying the least restrictive principles and working with a patient on medication choices brings up difficult empirical issues in ranking treatment options in accord with constitutional rights.

== See also ==
- O'Connor v. Donaldson
- United States v. Binion
- Washington v. Harper
- Jackson v. Indiana
- Perry v. Louisiana
- Rogers v. Okin
- Youngberg v. Romeo
