= John Roland =

American news presenter (1941–2023)

John Roland (November 25, 1941 – May 7, 2023) was an American news anchor and reporter. Pittsburgh native Roland began his broadcasting career in the 1960s, working for NBC News in Los Angeles and covering high-profile events such as the Robert F. Kennedy assassination and the Charles Manson trial. He joined WNEW-TV in New York City in 1969 and remained there for the rest of his career. Roland served as a political reporter, weekend anchor, and main anchor for various newscasts. He retired in 2004 after a long tenure with the station.

In 1988, Roland was suspended by WNYW-TV for an on-air argument with a mentally-ill homeless woman, Joyce Brown. He later apologized, and the station broadcast his apology. Roland has also made film appearances as a television anchor and as himself. In 1983, Roland disarmed and shot a robber during a late-night restaurant robbery, sustaining a head injury that required stitches.

== Career ==
Roland was a Pittsburgh, Pennsylvania, native who graduated from California State University at Long Beach in 1964; he began his broadcasting career in the 1960s. His first major assignment was for NBC News in Los Angeles in 1966. From there, he was hired as a reporter by then-Metromedia owned KTTV, where he covered the Robert F. Kennedy assassination and the Charles Manson trial, and then went to sister station WNEW-TV (now Fox-owned WNYW) in New York City beginning in December 1969. He remained with Channel 5 for the remainder of his broadcasting career.

In his early years with WNEW/WNYW, he was a political reporter and weekend anchor for The 10 O'Clock News, and even did a cooking segment that was shown frequently on the newscast. He took over as the main anchor for the weeknight edition in 1979 after Bill Jorgensen, who had presented the newscast from its start in 1967, left to join the rival station WPIX. Over the years, Roland's co-anchors included Bill McCreary, Cora-Ann Mihalik, and Rosanna Scotto. He left the 10:00 p.m. newscast in 2003 in order to prepare for his role as anchor of the new 5:00 and 6:00 p.m. newscasts that WNYW was preparing, which were launched that fall. His long run with the station came to an end upon his retirement on June 4, 2004.

In the late 1980s, Roland also opened a restaurant in New York named Marcello, with two partners, one of whom left the venture before the restaurant opened.

=== Suspension ===
In January 1988, Roland was suspended by WNYW-TV (Fox) after an on-air argument with Joyce Brown, a mentally-ill homeless woman whom the Koch Administration sought to have confined to a mental hospital for treatment. Brown, who was represented by the New York City chapter of the American Civil Liberties Union successfully challenged her incarceration in court. The interview quickly degenerated into an argument after Roland related his own personal experiences when he encountered Brown on the street. After the interview, numerous people called the station to protest Roland's treatment of Brown. The next day, the station suspended Roland, explaining that his emotions prevailed over his objectivity. Roland personally apologized to Brown, and the station broadcast a taped apology from him. After serving his brief suspension, Roland returned to the air.

== Film appearances ==
Roland appeared in several films, playing television anchors in Hero at Large (1980), Eyewitness (1981), and The Object of My Affection (1998). He played himself in The Scout (1994), and in three documentaries produced by filmmaker Dennis Michael Lynch, King of the Hamptons (2011) and 2012: They Come to America, The Cost of Illegal Immigration, and 2013: They Come to America 2: The Cost of Amnesty.

== Personal life ==
Roland was married four times, but had no children. After many years living in New York, he moved to North Miami shortly after his retirement from broadcasting.

On September 10, 2002, Roland was rushed to a local hospital after experiencing severe symptoms of diverticulitis. He needed 18 blood transfusions, and doctors had to remove part of his colon. Roland successfully recovered and returned to work at the station in late October.

On May 11, 1983, Roland and his friend were having a late-night dinner at the Racing Club, a restaurant on New York City's East Side, when three armed men burst in and attempted to rob customers. Roland disarmed one of the robbers and shot him in the leg. The other two then attacked Roland. One of the men struck him with a pistol, causing a laceration on his head that required 36 stitches. The police managed to arrest the three robbers and their getaway driver as they attempted to flee from the scene.

=== Death ===
Roland died of complications from a stroke on May 7, 2023, at the age of 81.
