= Ancora Psychiatric Hospital =

Coordinates: 39°41′18″N 74°50′58″W

- New Jersey Department of Human Services
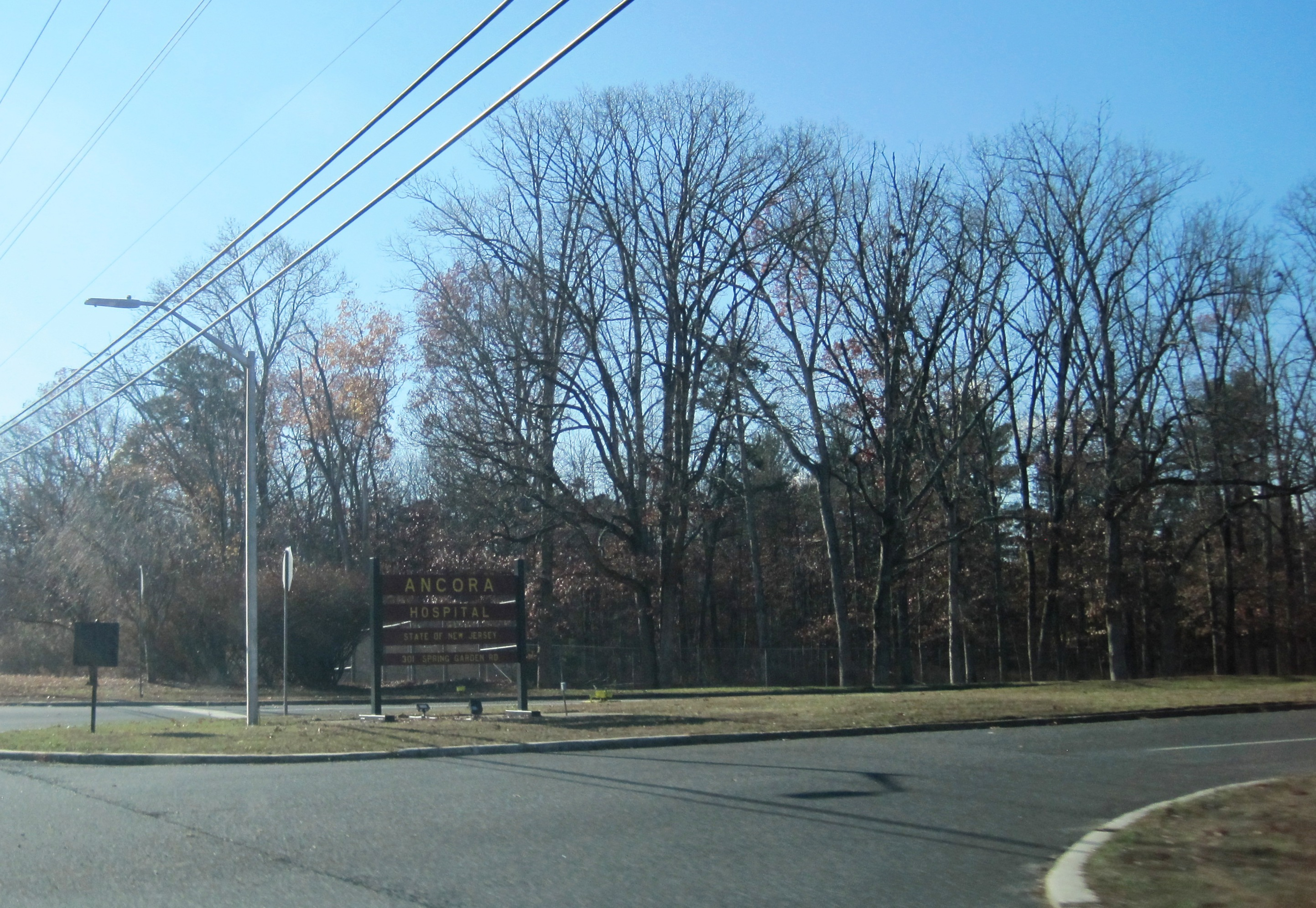
- Main entrance to the site from Route 143

Geography
- Location: Winslow Township, New Jersey, United States

Organization
- Type: Psychiatric

Services
- Beds: 532

Helipads
- Helipad: No

History
- Founded: 1955

Links
- Lists: Hospitals in the United States

Ancora Psychiatric Hospital is a 532 active bed (709 capacity) hospital located in the Ancora section of Winslow Township, New Jersey. The Ancora campus, opened in 1955, covers 650 acres (263 ha). The hospital offers a multidisciplinary team approach to development and implementation of care. Ancora is the largest of the state's four public psychiatric hospitals. Although the hospital is located in Winslow, it has a Hammonton mailing address. Ancora also has their own career fire company on site.

Most patients at Ancora have been committed involuntarily, as a potential danger to themselves or others.

== Criminal investigation and controversy ==
In 2008, an investigation by the U.S. Department of Justice took place at Ancora. There had been a substantial number of deaths and repeated injuries among patients at the facility since 2006. The investigation focused on whether patients were safe from harm, and whether residents were served in the settings most appropriate to their needs, and their civil rights not violated.

Investigators found that "patients at Ancora suffer an undue risk of harm, stemming from the facility's failure to treat aggressive and self-abusive behavior and its failure to implement systems to protect patients from harm." Ancora also "segregates far too many patients for whom a hospital setting is not appropriate."

== See also ==
- Rennie v. Klein
