= Journal of Psychosocial Nursing and Mental Health Services =

- Discipline: Nursing
- Language: English
- Edited by: Mona Shattell

Publication details
- History: 1963–present
- Publisher: Healio
- Frequency: Monthly
- Impact factor: 0.608 (2017)

Standard abbreviations
- ISO 4: J. Psychosoc. Nurs. Ment. Health Serv.

Indexing
- ISSN: 0279-3695 (print); 1938-2413 (web)
- LCCN: 2006264510
- OCLC no.: 07816794

Links
- Journal homepage; Online access; Online archive

The Journal of Psychosocial Nursing and Mental Health Services is a monthly peer-reviewed nursing journal for psychosocial and mental health nurses. It includes sections on psychopharmacology, mental health care of older adults, addictive behaviors and diagnoses, and child/adolescent disorders and issues. The editor-in-chief is Mona Shattell (Rush University). The journal was established in 1963 and published bimonthly. In 1978, the publication frequency increased to monthly.

== Abstracting and indexing ==
The journal is abstracted and indexed in:

- CINAHL
- Current Contents/Social & Behavioral Sciences
- Embase
- Index Medicus/MEDLINE/PubMed
- PASCAL
- ProQuest databases
- PsycINFO
- Science Citation Index Expanded
- Scopus
- Social Sciences Citation Index

According to the Journal Citation Reports, the journal has a 2017 impact factor of 0.608.

== See also ==
- List of nursing journals
