= Foucha v. Louisiana =

- Supreme Court of the United States

Argued November 4, 1991 Decided May 18, 1992
- Full case name: Terry Foucha v. State of Louisiana
- Docket no.: 90-5844
- Citations: 504 U.S. 71 (more) 112 S. Ct. 1780; 118 L. Ed. 2d 437; 1992 U.S. LEXIS 2703

Case history
- Prior: Petitioner's writ denied in State Court of Appeals, denial affirmed in State Supreme Court

Holding
- Potential dangerousness is not a justification to commit a person found not guilty by reason of insanity if no mental illness is present.

Court membership
- Chief Justice William Rehnquist Associate Justices Byron White · Harry Blackmun; John P. Stevens · Sandra Day O'Connor; Antonin Scalia · Anthony Kennedy; David Souter · Clarence Thomas

Case opinions
- Majority: White (Parts I, II), joined by Blackmun, Stevens, O'Connor, Souter
- Plurality: White (Part III), joined by Blackmun, Stevens, Souter
- Concurrence: O'Connor
- Dissent: Kennedy, joined by Rehnquist
- Dissent: Thomas, joined by Rehnquist, Scalia

Laws applied
- U.S. Const. amend. XIV

Foucha v. Louisiana, 504 U.S. 71 (1992), was a U.S. Supreme Court case in which the court addressed the criteria for the continued commitment of an individual who had been found not guilty by reason of insanity. The individual remained involuntarily confined on the justification that he was potentially dangerous even though he no longer suffered from the mental illness that served as a basis for his original commitment.

== Background ==
Petitioner Terry Foucha was charged with aggravated burglary and illegal discharge of a firearm. He burglarized a home after the occupants fled and discharged a firearm in the direction of a law enforcement officer. Initially he was evaluated as incompetent to proceed to trial because he was unable to understand the charges against him and meaningfully participate in court proceedings. When he later was evaluated as competent, he was tried and found not guilty by reason of insanity because he was unable to distinguish right from wrong at the time of the offense. He was committed to East Feliciana State Hospital (LA Maximum Secure) on the grounds that he had a mental illness and was dangerous.

Under Louisiana law, a criminal defendant found not guilty by reason of insanity and committed to a psychiatric hospital will remain there until the hospital review committee recommends that he be released. If the review committee recommends release, then the trial court must hold a hearing to determine whether he is dangerous to himself or others. If he is found to be dangerous, he may be returned to the hospital whether or not he is currently mentally ill. The committee met and stated that it could not guarantee that Foucha would not be a danger to himself or others.

Therefore, the state court ordered petitioner Foucha to return to the mental institution to which he had been committed, ruling that he was dangerous. The decision was based on a doctor's testimony that, although Foucha had recovered from the drug induced psychosis for which he was committed, he continued to be diagnosed as having an antisocial personality, a condition that is not a mental illness and is not considered treatable. Foucha had been involved in several fights within the facility which doctors felt might indicate he might pose a danger if released. The court stated the burden of proof rested on Foucha to prove that he was not a danger to himself or others.

=== Appeals ===
Foucha petitioned the Court for a writ of certiorari. The State Court of Appeals had denied Foucha's appeal and the Louisiana Supreme Court affirmed, holding, among other things, that per Jones v. United States (1983) Foucha's release was not required. The latter ruled that the Due Process Clause of the Fourteenth Amendment was not violated by the statutory provision permitting confinement of an insanity acquittee based on dangerousness alone, although dangerousness alone in the absence of a mental illness would not satisfy the standards for a civil commitment.

== Opinion of the Court ==
The Court ruled that potential dangerousness was not a justification to retain a person found not guilty by reason of insanity if no mental illness was present. James P. Manasseh argued the cause for petitioner. With him on the briefs was Martin E. Regan, Jr. An acquittee cannot be confined as a mental patient without some medical justification for doing so. Although the individual may be dangerous, the Court ruled that a person committed on the basis of an insanity defense and who has regained his sanity cannot continue to be confined on the sole justification that he remains dangerous. A (formerly) insane acquittee must remain both ill and dangerous to continue to be involuntarily committed. This ruling also applies to convicted persons. "There is no conceivable basis for distinguishing the commitment of a person who is nearing the end of a penal term from all other commitments."

Therefore, the State of Louisiana was not justified in retaining the petitioner unless it could prove that serious public safety concerns existed to justify the acquittee's continuing classification as dangerous.

== Significance ==
The Court clarified that if the justification for commitment after an insanity acquittal no longer applies, the individual is to be released. To maintain that an insanity acquittee remain civilly committed to a psychiatric institution until he is no longer a danger to himself or others is unconstitutional. In this case the basis for commitment was that the defendant was both not responsible due to a mental illness and was dangerous. If he no longer suffers from a mental illness, then there is no justification to detain him. States must maintain the same standard for involuntarily committed insanity acquittees as they do for civilly committed individuals. Commitment must be based on standard principles of civil commitment, including proving that the individual is mentally ill. Commitment cannot be an automatic consequence of the acquittal.

== See also ==
- List of United States Supreme Court cases, volume 504
- List of United States Supreme Court cases
- Lists of United States Supreme Court cases by volume
- List of United States Supreme Court cases by the Rehnquist Court
- Jackson v. Indiana (1972)
- O'Connor v. Donaldson (1975)
- Addington v. Texas (1979)
- Jones v. United States (1983)
