= Jones v. United States (1983) =

- Supreme Court of the United States

Argued November 2, 1982 Decided June 29, 1983
- Full case name: Michael Jones v. United States
- Citations: 463 U.S. 354 (more) 103 S. Ct. 3043; 77 L. Ed. 2d 694

Case history
- Prior: 432 A.2d 364 (D.C. 1981); cert. granted, 454 U.S. 1141 (1982).

Holding
- A verdict of not guilty by reason of insanity is sufficiently probative of mental illness and dangerousness to justify commitment of the acquittee for the purposes of treatment and the protection of society. Such a verdict establishes that the defendant committed an act constituting a criminal offense, and that he committed the act because of mental illness. Indefinite commitment of an insanity acquittee, based on proof of insanity by only a preponderance of the evidence, comports with due process.

Court membership
- Chief Justice Warren E. Burger Associate Justices William J. Brennan Jr. · Byron White; Thurgood Marshall · Harry Blackmun; Lewis F. Powell Jr. · William Rehnquist; John P. Stevens · Sandra Day O'Connor

Case opinions
- Majority: Powell, joined by Burger, White, Rehnquist, O'Connor
- Dissent: Brennan, joined by Marshall, Blackmun
- Dissent: Stevens

Laws applied
- U.S. Const. amend. XIV

Jones v. United States, 463 U.S. 354 (1983), is a United States Supreme Court case in which the court, for the first time, addressed whether the due process requirement of the Fourteenth Amendment allows defendants, who were found not guilty by reason of insanity (NGRI) of a misdemeanor crime, to be involuntarily confined to a mental institution until such times as they are no longer a danger to themselves or others with few other criteria or procedures limiting the actions of the state.

== Background ==
Historically, those persons acquitted of a crime by reason of insanity (insanity acquittees) were subjected to commitment procedures to institutions for the "criminally insane" with little attention or oversight provided as to what these procedures were. In the early 1970s, the procedures began to be examined legally on constitutional as well as therapeutic grounds.

At that time, U.S. state jurisdictions had varying criteria and procedures governing this situation. In some states, insanity acquittees were governed by the same rules and procedures as an individual facing civil commitment. Another group of states, although treating insanity acquittees in a generally similar fashion as the civilly committed, had more stringent criteria governing insanity acquittees; for example, in emergency commitment proceedings in which a civilly committed person may be committed for a maximum of one week, an insanity acquittee may be committed on an emergency basis for 90 days—and then the discharge would take place only after judicial approval. A third group subjected an insanity acquittee to automatic, indefinite commitment, usually with periodic reviews to determine if commitment continued to be necessary.

== Facts of the case ==
On September 19, 1975, Michael Jones was charged with petit larceny, a misdemeanor, for attempting to steal a jacket from a Washington, D.C. department store. Upon arraignment in the District of Columbia Superior Court, the judge ordered a competency evaluation at St. Elizabeth's Hospital. The competency report to the court was that Jones suffered from paranoid schizophrenia, but that he was competent to proceed to trial. Eventually, Jones plead not guilty by reason of insanity to the misdemeanor offense, which carried a one-year maximum sentence; the prosecution did not contest the plea and Jones was automatically committed to St. Elizabeth's for a minimum of 50 days.

Upon his first release hearing in May 1976, his request for release was denied. In his second release hearing held in February 1977, his request for either release or civil commitment was also denied, despite the contention of Jones' counsel that his cumulative hospitalization exceeded the maximum penalty of a one-year incarceration for the crime. For the government's case, a psychologist from St. Elizabeth's Hospital testified that, in the opinion of the hospital's staff, Jones continued to actively suffer from paranoid schizophrenia and therefore remained a danger to himself and others.

=== Appeals ===
The case was appealed to the District of Columbia Court of Appeals, which affirmed the lower court's decision, although three judges dissented. The case was then appealed to the Supreme Court.

== Decision ==
The Supreme Court examined two issues. The first was whether there was a constitutional basis for the practice in most states, and the District of Columbia, of automatically committing insanity acquitees. The court found that there was. Justice Powell, writing for the court, said that Jones' verdict established that he committed the crime and that he did so because he was mentally ill by a preponderance of evidence. "Congress has determined that a criminal defendant found not guilty by reason of insanity in the District of Columbia should be committed indefinitely to a mental institution for treatment and the protection of society."

The second issue was the proportionality of the commitment compared to Jones' hypothetical maximum sentence had he been imprisoned; that is, does the maximum sentence provide a constitutional limit for Jones' commitment? Although three judges at the District Court level had agreed that the constitution does provide such a limit, the Supreme Court rejected this line of thinking. Writing for the majority, Powell argued that different considerations go into the choosing of a sentence than those underlying a commitment of an insanity acquittee. He argued against the idea that indefinite commitment amounted to punishment.

Indefinite commitment of an insanity acquittee, based on proof of insanity by only a preponderance of the evidence, comports with due process. Addington v. Texas (1979) held that the government, in a civil commitment proceeding, must demonstrate by clear and convincing evidence that the individual is mentally ill and dangerous. However, the concerns critical to that decision—based on the risk of error that a person might be committed for mere "idiosyncratic behavior"—are diminished or absent in the case of insanity acquitees, and do not require the same standard of proof in both cases. Proof that the acquittee committed a criminal act as a result of mental illness eliminates the risk that he is being committed for mere idiosyncratic behavior.

== See also ==
- List of United States Supreme Court cases, volume 463
- Jackson v. Indiana (1972)
- O'Connor v. Donaldson (1975)
- Addington v. Texas (1979)
- Foucha v. Louisiana (1992)
