= Rogers v. Okin =

American legal case

Rogers v. Okin was a landmark case in which the United States Court of Appeals for the First Circuit considered whether a person diagnosed with mental illness committed to a state psychiatric facility and assumed to be competent, has the right to make treatment decisions in non-emergency conditions.

== Circumstances ==
This case began as a federal class action suit filed in 1975 by patients at Boston State Hospital challenging the hospital's restraint, seclusion and involuntary treatment policies in Federal District Court. Seven plaintiffs were named. The lawsuit sought to enjoin the hospital from medicating patients against their will and from isolating them in seclusion cells. Greater Boston Legal Services represented the patients.

The district court held that the competency of committed patients is assumed until a patient is adjudicated incompetent, holding that forced medication was an invasion of privacy and an affront to human dignity as such patients are capable of making non-emergency treatment decisions. Only under emergency conditions could such a patient be forcibly medicated where there was a substantial likelihood of physical harm to the patient's self or others. Voluntary patients had the same rights.

The case was appealed to the US Court of Appeals for the First Circuit which affirmed the lower courts ruling that patients had the right to decide for themselves whether to accept treatment of antipsychotic drugs and that mental illness did not render a person incompetent. However, the court rejected the lower court's standard for determining when medications could be given involuntarily, determining that the evaluating physician was to make ultimate medication decision. The court disagreed with the trial judge that forcible medication, absent an emergency, could be administered only after an adjudication of incompetence. It also rejected the trial court's holding that voluntary patients could refuse medication, stating that a voluntary patient who wished to refuse treatment should leave the hospital.

The state appealed on a writ of certiorari the US Supreme Court for review The Supreme Court granted certiorari but then remanded the case back to the Court of Appeals in the light of Richard Roe. The American Psychological Association submitted a brief supporting the plaintiffs to the Supreme Judicial Court of Massachusetts.

== Decision ==
The Massachusetts Supreme Judicial Court decision was consistent with its ruling in Richard Roe. The decision required that a court must hold a full evidentiary hearing, with counsel representing both sides and expert witness if needed, to make the decision whether an incompetent patient should be treated. This determination was to be made on the basis of "substituted judgment", that is, on an estimation of what the patient would have desired, were he competent.

== Significance ==
Throughout most of the 1970s, the legal assumption was that, once hospitalized, a patient had no role in treatment decisions. Hospitals could medicate and use other means of control or treatment without consultation with the patient or the patient's family.

This decision was one of the first that contributed to a growing body of case law recognizing that prisoners and competent mental patients have the right to refuse treatment. Rogers v. Okin set forth a procedure that would copied by many other states. This procedure requires a court hearing before a patient may be involuntarily medicated.

== See also ==
- O'Connor v. Donaldson
- Rennie v. Klein
- Washington v. Harper
