= Mona Shattell =

American professor of nursing

- Citizenship: USA
- Education: Syracuse University; University of Tennessee
- Known for: Nursing advocacy, Truckers/Trucking work environments, Psychosis
- Awards: Fellow AAN; Researcher of the Year, International Society of Psychiatric/Mental Health Nurses
- Scientific career
- Fields: Psychiatric and mental health nursing
- Workplaces: University of North Carolina at Charlotte; University of Alabama at Birmingham; University of North Carolina at Greensboro; DePaul University; Rush University; Johns Hopkins University
- Thesis: Making them your friend: A phenomenological study of patients' experience soliciting nursing care in the hospital setting (2002)
- Doctoral advisor: Sandra Thomas
- Website: nursing.jhu.edu/faculty_research/faculty/faculty-directory/mona-shattell

Mona Shattell is an American professor of nursing. She is best known for her contributions to improving the mental health of vulnerable populations (including truckers), developing psychiatric treatment environments, and promoting the voice of nursing in public dialogue.

Shattell earned her BS (1986) in nursing and her MS (1996) in nursing at Syracuse University, and she earned her doctorate in 2002 from the University of Tennessee.

Prior to joining the faculty at Johns Hopkins University, where she is currently the inaugural Associate Dean for Faculty Development, Shattell was the Chair of the Department of Community, Systems, and Mental Health Nursing at Rush University, and she served as the associate dean for research and faculty development in the College of Science and Health at DePaul University.

In 2013, Shattell was inducted as a Fellow of the American Academy of Nursing, and in 2017 she was appointed Editor of the Journal of Psychosocial Nursing and Mental Health Services.

== Contributions to Psychiatric and mental health nursing ==
Shattell is a pioneer in the use of psychosensory therapy within the field of nursing. She documented the importance of establishing and maintaining therapeutic relationship between nurse and patient, including the importance of demonstrating understanding and employing empathy to reinforce a positive psychological balance for a patient as a means of combating the social stigma of mental illness. Shattell further demonstrated the importance of providing support through joining in activities, including the importance of physical touch, such as a placing a hand on the shoulder, as a tangible means of demonstrating support. She also reported on the value of nurses sharing emotion with patients, including tearfulness, blunt feedback, and straight talk, as important to developing a sense of genuine relationship.

== Nursing leadership in the public sphere ==
From 2012–2013, Shattell participated in the Op-Ed Project Public Voices Thought Leadership Fellowship where she promoted the importance of nurses writing op-ed articles. Since 2012, she has co-authored more than 50 op-eds appearing in The New York Times, The Atlantic, and The Hill, among others.
