= Jackson v. Indiana =

- Supreme Court of the United States

Argued November 18, 1971 Decided June 7, 1972
- Full case name: Theon Jackson v. Indiana
- Citations: 406 U.S. 715 (more) 92 S. Ct. 1845; 32 L. Ed. 2d 435

Case history
- Prior: Jackson v. State, 253 Ind. 487, 255 N.E.2d 515 (1970); cert. granted, 401 U.S. 973 (1971).

Holding
- The state of Indiana cannot constitutionally commit the petitioner for an indefinite period on the sole grounds that he was incompetent to stand trial on the charges filed against him.

Court membership
- Chief Justice Warren E. Burger Associate Justices William O. Douglas · William J. Brennan Jr. Potter Stewart · Byron White; Thurgood Marshall · Harry Blackmun; Lewis F. Powell Jr. · William Rehnquist

Case opinion
- Majority: Blackmun, joined by Burger, Douglas, Brennan, Stewart, White, Marshall
- Powell and Rehnquist took no part in the consideration or decision of the case.

Laws applied
- U.S. Const. amends. VIII, XIV

Jackson v. Indiana, 406 U.S. 715 (1972), is a landmark decision of the United States Supreme Court that determined a U.S. state violated due process by involuntarily committing a criminal defendant for an indefinite period of time solely on the basis of his permanent incompetency to stand trial on the charges filed against him.

== Background ==
In general, if a defendant is found incompetent to proceed to trial, the criminal proceedings are suspended. In those cases, where the charges are petty, the charges are often dropped or a plea bargain may be made in which the charges are nolle prossed if the defendant agrees to seek treatment. Otherwise, the defendant is usually committed to a psychiatric hospital for treatment until the defendant is restored to competency, at which point the trial will proceed.

=== Facts ===
Theon Jackson, a deaf-mute who could not read, write or communicate in other ways, was charged with two counts of robbery. Competency evaluations and testimony by the evaluating doctors showed that Jackson's intelligence was too low for him to understand the nature of the charges against him, even if he were able to develop the ability to communicate, and that the prognosis for restoration of competency was "rather dim" even if he were not a deaf mute. Despite testimony that the state of Indiana had no facilities to treat Jackson's problems, Jackson was committed to a psychiatric hospital for treatment.

=== Appeals ===
Jackson filed a motion for a new trial. This was denied.

Appealing on a writ of certiorari to the Supreme Court of Indiana, Indiana attorneys Frank Spencer and Robert Robinson argued on behalf of the petitioner Jackson that Jackson's commitment was equal to a "life sentence" even though he had not been convicted of a crime. They claimed that petitioner Jackson was being denied equal protection because, without the criminal charges pending against him, the State would have been required to proceed using Indiana's statutory provisions for the feeble-minded or for the mentally ill. Under these provisions Jackson would have been entitled to greater rights. They also claimed that what was essentially an indefinite commitment deprived him of due process and subjected him to cruel and unusual punishment. However, the State Supreme Court affirmed the denial of the lower court. A rehearing was also denied. The U.S. Supreme Court granted certiorari.

== Ruling ==
The Supreme Court reversed. With Indiana attorney Robert Robinson present, arguments were presented by Indiana attorney Frank Spencer. It held that the state of Indiana cannot constitutionally commit the petitioner for an indefinite period of time on the sole grounds that he was incompetent to stand trial on the charges filed against him, thus violating both the equal protection and due process clauses of the Fourteenth Amendment.

The Court examined Indiana procedure of pretrial commitment of incompetent criminal defendant as set forth in Ind. Ann. Stat. 9-1706a and compared it with the procedures for committing persons who are "feeble-minded, and are therefore unable properly to care for themselves" and those for the "mentally ill". The Court found the procedures were essentially similar with one important difference. A person committed as "feeble-minded" may be released "at any time" his condition warrants it in the judgment of the superintendent of the institution. A person committed as "mentally ill" may be released when the superintendent of the institution discharges him, or when he is cured. Committing the criminal defendant indefinitely violates equal protection.

Therefore, the Court ruled that Indiana's indefinite commitment of a criminal defendant solely because he lacks the capacity to stand trial violates due process.

Such a defendant cannot be held more than the reasonable period of time necessary to determine whether there is a substantial probability that he will attain competency in the foreseeable future. If it is determined that he will not, the State must either institute civil proceedings applicable to the commitment of those not charged with a crime, or release the defendant.

The Court declined to rule on the issue of the pending charges themselves, reasoning that the issue of petitioner's criminal responsibility at the time of the alleged offenses has not yet been adjudicated, and therefore it would be premature for the Court to dismiss the charges against petitioner.

== Significance ==
Before this landmark case, pre-trial involuntary commitment of incompetent individuals often meant lengthy or even lifetime confinement in a maximum security institution with little concern for treatment. This was true even though they were neither tried for or convicted of a crime. In this case, the Court for the first time put limits on the length of time an incompetent person may be confined. However, the Court offers only general guidelines and by 1994, twenty years after the case, 32 states still had not enacted periodic judicial review of incompetent detainees. Many states still allowed a detention period that exceeded that maximum sentence that person would have received if convicted.

Further, by refusing to rule on the charges themselves, the court did not clarify the proper disposition of criminal charges pending against a person whose competency can not be restored. This means that in those states where the charges are not dismissed, the individual may not be converted to a civil status eligible for civil commitment, resulting in such an individual's continued confinement in a secure prison with little opportunity for treatment and fewer privileges.

== See also ==
- List of United States Supreme Court cases, volume 406
- O'Connor v. Donaldson (1975)
- Addington v. Texas (1979)
- Jones v. United States (1983)
- Foucha v. Louisiana (1992)
