= Inquiry (health journal) =

INQUIRY
- Discipline: Health policy
- Language: English
- Edited by: Umair Shafique

Publication details
- History: 1964–present
- Publisher: Sage Publishing
- Frequency: Continuous
- Open access: Yes
- License: CC BY-NC
- Impact factor: 3.0 (2025)

Standard abbreviations
- ISO 4: Inquiry

Indexing
- ISSN: 0046-9580
- LCCN: sf82008019
- OCLC no.: 02057017

Links
- Journal homepage; Online access; Online archive

INQUIRY: The Journal of Health Care Organization, Provision and Financing is a peer-reviewed public health and healthcare journal covering public policy issues, innovative concepts, and original research in healthcare provision.

== Abstracting and indexing ==
The journal is abstracted and indexed in MEDLINE/PubMed, Science Citation Index Expanded, Social Sciences Citation Index, Current Contents/Social & Behavioral Sciences, and Current Contents/Clinical Medicine. According to the Journal Citation Reports, the journal has a 2023 impact factor of 1.7.
