= Addington v. Texas =

- Supreme Court of the United States

Argued November 28, 1978 Decided April 30, 1979
- Full case name: Frank O'Neal Addington v. State of Texas
- Citations: 441 U.S. 418 (more) 99 S. Ct. 1804; 60 L. Ed. 2d 323; 1979 U.S. LEXIS 93

Case history
- Prior: Cert. to the Supreme Court of Texas

Holding
- That a "clear and convincing" standard of proof is required by the Fourteenth Amendment in a civil proceeding brought under state law to commit an individual involuntarily for an indefinite period to a state mental hospital.

Court membership
- Chief Justice Warren E. Burger Associate Justices William J. Brennan Jr. · Potter Stewart; Byron White · Thurgood Marshall; Harry Blackmun · Lewis F. Powell Jr. William Rehnquist · John P. Stevens

Case opinion
- Majority: Burger, joined by Brennan, Stewart, White, Marshall, Blackmun, Rehnquist, Stevens
- Powell took no part in the consideration or decision of the case.

Laws applied
- U.S. Const. amend. XIV

Addington v. Texas, 441 U.S. 418 (1979), is a landmark decision of the US Supreme Court that set the standard for involuntary commitment for treatment by raising the burden of proof required to commit persons for psychiatric treatment from the usual civil burden of proof of "preponderance of the evidence" to "clear and convincing evidence".

== Background ==
Before Frank Addington was arrested on the misdemeanor charge of "assault threat" against his mother, Addington's mother filed a petition with the court, in accordance with Texas law, requesting that Addington be indefinitely involuntarily committed to a state psychiatric hospital. Addington had a long history of mental and emotional problems and past psychiatric hospitalizations. The state trial court issued jury instructions that the decision be based on "clear, unequivocal and convincing evidence" that Addington was mentally ill and that hospitalization was required for his own welfare and the welfare of others. The jury found that Addington was mentally ill and required hospitalization. Thereupon the trial court ordered his indefinite commitment. He was indefinitely committed to Austin State Hospital.

However, Addington appealed to the Texas Court of Appeals, based on the argument the court should have used the "beyond a reasonable doubt" standard of proof. The appeals court reversed, agreeing with Addington. The Texas Supreme Court then reversed the Court of Appeals' decision, reinstating the trial court's orders. It concluded that the standard of proof of the preponderance of the evidence satisfied due process in a civil commitment proceeding.

Addington then appealed to the U.S. Supreme Court on a writ of certiorari.

== Opinion of the Court ==
The appeal was dismissed and certiorari granted; the lower court's decision was vacated and remanded. The court said the issue of an individual's interest in liberty is of such weight and gravity that a higher standard of proof is required than is normal in civil cases brought under state law. Because of the uncertainties of psychiatric diagnosis, the burden of proof does not need to be as high as "beyond a reasonable doubt" in criminal cases, but should be a "clear and convincing" standard of proof as required by the Fourteenth Amendment in such a civil proceeding to commit an individual involuntarily for an indefinite period to a state psychiatric hospital.

Further, the opinion touched on the issue of an involuntary commitment as primarily medical in nature and needing the expertise of mental health experts.

Whether the individual is mentally ill and dangerous to either himself or others and is in need of confined therapy turns on the meaning of the facts which must be interpreted by expert psychiatrists and psychologists.

== Subsequent developments ==
The court raised the bar for committing someone against their will in a civil commitment proceeding. When the stakes are exceptionally high in civil matters, the burden of proof must be "clear and convincing evidence". The case raised important issues regarding civil commitment by placing the burden of proof on the petitioner, that is the party seeking the involuntary commitment of a person.

The opinion also suggested that it was not necessarily for the trier of facts to draw the necessary conclusions without the expertise of psychiatrists and psychologists.

The Supreme Court also cited the Addington case in Santosky v. Kramer, which set a clear and convincing evidence standard in termination of parental rights cases.

== See also ==
- Jackson v. Indiana (1972)
- O'Connor v. Donaldson (1975)
- Jones v. United States (1983)
- Foucha v. Louisiana (1992)
