= Francine Cournos =

Psychiatrist and HIV researcher

- Born: June 29, 1945 (age 81); New York City, New York, U.S.
- Education: City College of New York; New York University School of Medicine
- Scientific career
- Fields: HIV/AIDS; Mental health
- Workplaces: Columbia University

Francine Cournos (born June 29, 1945) is Professor of Clinical Psychiatry (in Epidemiology) at the Columbia University Mailman School of Public Health. Cournos is also Principal Investigator of the Northeast Caribbean AIDS Education and Training Center at the HIV Center for Clinical and Behavioral Studies.

== Early life ==
Cournos was born on June 29, 1945, in New York City to Alexander and Muriel Cournos. Her father Alexander (d. 1948) worked as a copyeditor for The New York Times.

Cournos's father, grandfather, and mother died during her childhood. Her mother did not talk to Cournos and her siblings about the progression of her breast cancer, so her death shocked the children. After her mother's death, when Cournos was eleven years old, Cournos and her sister were sent to live with their grandmother. At thirteen years old, her family placed her into foster care with a family in Long Island, New York. Cournos said that being sent to foster care as harder to take than her parents' deaths and she felt that it was "just the act of being up-rooted from everything familiar." She recalls: "As a kid you're not only attached to your parents, you're attached to a million things — your neighborhood, your friends, your candy store.... I lost everything."

Cournos received a BS from the City College of New York in 1967. She received an MD from the New York University School of Medicine in 1971. In 1975, she married Nicholas Bakalar.

== Career ==
Cournos was director of the Washington Heights Community Service (WHCS) from 1978 to 2010. From 1982 to 1986, she was Chief Medical Officer for the NYS Office of Mental Health. She received the Exemplary Psychiatrist Award from the National Alliance for the Mentally Ill in 1999. The American Psychiatric Association made Dr. Cournos a Distinguished Life Fellow.

Cournos was also Interim Director of the New York State Psychiatric Institute from 2003 to 2004 and then served as Deputy Director and Vice-Chair of the New York State Psychiatric Institute at Columbia University from 2005 to 2006.

In the 1980s, Cournos testified in the trial of Joyce Patricia Brown, also known as Billie Boggs, which involved the forced psychiatric care of the homeless mentally ill. Cournos believed Brown was seriously mentally ill and could benefit from medication on the condition that it was not involuntary.

=== Research ===
Since 1983, Cournos has worked on "the interface of HIV and mental illness" which included publishing the first seroprevalence study to "document the elevated rates of HIV infection in people with severe mental illness." In addition, she has worked on clinical practice guidelines and policies concerning mental health issues and HIV for the World Health Organization, American Psychiatric Institute and the New York State AIDS Institute. Cournos has also been Principal Investigator of the New York/New Jersey AIDS Education and Training Project.

Annika Sweetland is working with Cournos on the subject of multimorbidities in Mozambique "to develop an integrated care strategy that has the potential to dramatically change care delivery and improve health outcomes."

== Selected publications ==
- Cournos, Francine (December 1993). "Do psychiatric patients need greater protection than medical patients when they consent to treatment?". Psychiatric Quarterly. 64 (4): 319–329. doi:10.1007/BF01064925. PMID 8234545. S2CID 26548993.
- Cournos, Francine; Bakalar, Nicholas, eds. (1996). AIDS and People with Severe Mental Illness: A Handbook for Mental Health Professionals. Yale University Press. ISBN 9780300067576.
- Cournos, Francine (1999). City of One: A Memoir. New York: Plume. ISBN 9780452281813.
- Sullivan, Greer; Koegel, Paul; Kanouse, David E.; Cournos, Francine; McKinnon, Karen; Young, Alexander; Bean, Donna (May 1999). "HIV and People with Serious Mental Illness: The Public Sector's Role in Reducing Health Risk and Improving Care". Psychiatric Services. 50 (5): 648–652. doi:10.1176/ps.50.5.648. PMID 10332900.
- Cournos, Francine; Wainberg, M; Horwath, E (2005). Psychiatric Care in Anti-retroviral (ARV) Therapy (for Second Level Care). World Health Organization.
