= Society (journal) =

- Discipline: Sociology, political science
- Language: English
- Edited by: Daniel Gordon

Publication details
- Former names: Transaction: Social Science and Modern Society
- History: 1963–present
- Publisher: Springer Science+Business Media
- Frequency: Bimonthly
- Open access: Hybrid
- Impact factor: 1.4 (2023)

Standard abbreviations
- ISO 4: Society

Indexing
- ISSN: 0147-2011 (print); 1936-4725 (web)
- LCCN: 72625393
- OCLC no.: 476228864

Links
- Journal homepage; Online archive

Society is a peer-reviewed academic journal covering research in the social sciences and public policy. It was established in 1963 as Transaction: Social Science and Modern Society by Irving Louis Horowitz. It was published by Transaction Publishers before being purchased by Springer Science+Business Media in 2003. The editor-in-chief is Daniel Gordon (University of Massachusetts Amherst).

== Article types ==
The journal publishes research articles, commentaries, forums, and book reviews.

== Abstracting and indexing ==
The journal is abstracted and indexed in the Social Sciences Citation Index. According to the Journal Citation Reports, the journal has a 2023 impact factor of 1.4.
