= O'Connor v. Donaldson =

O'Connor v. Kenneth Donaldson
- Supreme Court of the United States

Argued January 15, 1975 Decided June 26, 1975
- Full case name: Dr. J. B. O'Connor v. Kenneth Donaldson
- Citations: 422 U.S. 563 (more) 95 S. Ct. 2486; 45 L. Ed. 2d 396; 1975 U.S. LEXIS 81

Case history
- Prior: Cert. to the U.S. Court of Appeals for the Fifth Circuit

Holding
- A State cannot constitutionally confine non-dangerous individuals who are capable of surviving safely in freedom by themselves or with the help of willing and responsible family members or friends.

Court membership
- Chief Justice Warren E. Burger Associate Justices William O. Douglas · William J. Brennan Jr. Potter Stewart · Byron White; Thurgood Marshall · Harry Blackmun; Lewis F. Powell Jr. · William Rehnquist

Case opinions
- Majority: Stewart, joined by unanimous
- Concurrence: Burger

Laws applied
- U.S. Const. amends. IV, XIV

O'Connor v. Donaldson, 422 U.S. 563 (1975), was a landmark decision of the US Supreme Court in mental health law. It ruled that a state cannot constitutionally confine non-dangerous individuals who are capable of surviving safely in freedom by themselves or with the help of willing and responsible family members or friends. Since the trial court jury found, upon ample evidence, that petitioner did so confine respondent, the Supreme Court upheld the trial court's conclusion that petitioner had violated respondent's right to liberty. The case was important in the deinstitutionalization movement in the United States.

== Background ==
Kenneth Donaldson, a confined patient, had been held for 15 years in Florida State Hospital at Chattahoochee, because of needs of "care, maintenance, and treatment." He filed a lawsuit against the hospital and staff members that claimed that they had robbed him of his constitutional rights by confining him against his will. Donaldson won his case (including monetary damages) in a United States District Court, which was affirmed by the United States Court of Appeals for the Fifth Circuit. In 1975, the United States Supreme Court agreed that Donaldson had been improperly confined but vacated the award of damages. On remand, the Fifth Circuit ordered that a new trial on damages be held.

== Decision ==
A finding of "mental illness" alone cannot justify a state's locking a person up against his will and keeping him indefinitely in simple custodial confinement. Assuming that that term can be given a reasonably precise content and that the "mentally ill" can be identified with reasonable accuracy, there is still no constitutional basis for confining such persons involuntarily if they are dangerous to no one and can live safely in freedom.

May the State confine the mentally ill merely to ensure them a living standard superior to that they enjoy in the private community? That the State has a proper interest in providing care and assistance to the unfortunate goes without saying. But the mere presence of mental illness does not disqualify a person from preferring his home to the comforts of an institution. Moreover, while the State may arguably confine a person to save him from harm, incarceration is rarely if ever a necessary condition for raising the living standards of those capable of surviving safely in freedom, on their own or with the help of family or friends. May the State fence in the harmless mentally ill solely to save its citizens from exposure to those whose ways are different? One might as well ask if the State, to avoid public unease, could incarcerate all who are physically unattractive or socially eccentric. Mere public intolerance or animosity cannot constitutionally justify the deprivation of a person's physical liberty. In short, a State cannot constitutionally confine without more a non-dangerous individual who is capable of surviving safely in freedom by himself or with the help of willing and responsible family members or friends. ...

== Kenneth Donaldson ==
The origins of Donaldson's institutionalization began in 1943, at age 34, when he suffered a traumatic episode. He was hospitalized, received treatment, and resumed life with his family.

In 1956, Donaldson traveled to Florida to visit his elderly parents. While there, Donaldson reported that he believed one of his neighbors in Philadelphia might be poisoning his food. His father, worried that his son suffered from paranoid delusions, petitioned the court for a sanity hearing. Donaldson was evaluated, diagnosed with "paranoid schizophrenia," and civilly committed to the Florida State mental health system. At his commitment trial, Donaldson did not have legal counsel present to represent his case. Once he entered the Florida hospital, Donaldson was placed with dangerous criminals even though he had never been proved to be dangerous to himself or to others. His ward was understaffed, with only one doctor (who happened to be an obstetrician) for over 1,000 male patients. There were no psychiatrists or counsellors, and the only nurse on site worked in the infirmary.

He spent 15 years as a patient; he did not receive any treatment, actively refused it, and attempted to secure his release. Throughout his stay, he denied he was ever mentally ill and refused to be put into a halfway house.

Donaldson later wrote a book about his experience as a mental patient, Insanity Inside Out.

== See also ==
- List of United States Supreme Court cases, volume 422
- Jackson v. Indiana (1972)
- Addington v. Texas (1979)
- Jones v. United States (1983)
- Foucha v. Louisiana (1992)
