= Aftermarket (merchandise) =

Market for replacement parts, upgrades and maintenance for original equipment

Aftermarket in economic literature refers to a secondary market for the goods and services that are complementary or related to the primary market goods (also known as original equipment). In many industries, the primary market consists of durable goods, whereas the aftermarket consists of consumable or non-durable products or services.

In the moment, aftermarket goods mainly include products and services for replacement parts, upgrade, maintenance and enhancement.

== Elements ==
There are two essential elements of the aftermarket: installed base and vendor lock-in effect.

=== Installed base ===
A certain level of installed base of original equipment customers is necessary for the sufficient demand of aftermarket products.

Therefore, significant installed base normally makes aftermarket profitable as an established installed base is likely to consume the aftermarket products repeatedly over the lifespan of their durable goods.

=== Lock-in effect (also installed-base opportunism) ===
Lock-in effect or installed-base opportunism refers to the situation where the customers can only purchase the aftermarket goods produced by original equipment manufacturer.

The reasons for a lock-in can be:

- Compatibility between primary and aftermarket goods which requires switching costs of original equipment
- contractual means which imposes penalty
- provision of incentives to use specific primary and aftermarket products

These two essentials, installed base and lock-in effect, make aftermarket less volatile relative to primary market and therefore more likely to be profitable.

== Strategy ==
The most well-known aftermarket strategy model is "Gillette's razor and blades business model" also known as "freebie marketing" whereby a product is largely discounted or even free as a loss leader in order to increase the sales of its complementary goods.

Often the durable goods are offered at a low price (or even below marginal cost) in order to attract new customers amid competitive primary markets and the loss from the primary market will be rebated by the profits from consumables in aftermarket. In this case, an established installed base is essential to ensure sustainable business practice.

Tying or bundling of aftermarket products with original equipment also could be the strategies for aftermarket.

== Examples ==
- Inkjet printers and toner cartridges are well-known examples of original equipment and their aftermarket products. Many inkjet printer manufacturers employ technology which renders their printers compatible only with printer cartridges they also manufacture in order to increase their aftermarket profits.
- Many mobile network carriers offers contracts by which consumers could get a mobile phone device for a lower price or even free in exchange for long-term network service contract.
- Some automobiles only could be fixed by the specially trained engineers from the company manufacturing those cars.

== Monopolisation ==
There have been a significant number of economic literature discussing about the aftermarket monopolisation after US Supreme Court's 1992 decision in the case Eastman Kodak Company v. Image Technical Service. The key issue of the debate is whether the monopolisation in the aftermarket harms customers and social welfare.

=== Chicago school ===
The Chicago school economists and advocates of this approach assert that aftermarket monopolization would not be harmful for the following reasons:

- The primary market and its aftermarket should be considered as a single joint market since they are to a large extent related; unless both primary and aftermarket are monopolized, there will be no anti-competitive impact in monopolizing either of them.
- Consumers are rational and farsighted. They can accurately reckon the whole lifecycle cost of a product including original equipment and aftermarket costs; a supplier is not able to charge supra-competitive prices in the aftermarket or
- Even if the supplier is able to charge supra-competitive prices in the aftermarket, these profits should be employed to lower the price of the original equipment in order to attract consumers in its primary market.

In addition, the Chicago school argues that aftermarket monopolization enables manufacturers to afford investments into quality improvement of their original equipment; consumers may benefit from quality primary goods for lower price and overall economic efficiency therefore increases.

=== Post-Chicago school ===
In contrast to the Chicago school, the post-Chicago school asserts that the monopolization in the aftermarket could harm consumer welfare as following reasons:

- The profits from the increase in prices in the monopolized aftermarket tend to outweigh the loss from the decrease in new sales in the primary market competition; exploiting installed base might be more profitable than competing in the primary market
- Moreover, high switching costs of primary goods worsen the lock-in effect; monopolists have more incentives to exploit the locked-in customers with the supra-competitive pricing
- Customers are not always farsighted, but myopic; they are highly focusing on the upfront costs of original equipment which allows manufacturers to exploit them by the supra-competitive pricing in the aftermarket

In addition, the post-Chicago school economists argue that the primary market where the investments costs in original equipment are largely subsidized by the profits from its monopolized aftermarket tend to be anti-competitive as entry into a market will be difficult without installed base.

=== Consensus ===
Although Chicago school economists assumes that theoretically consumers are farsighted and rational, the results of a number of empirical economic literature insist that consumers are in many cases highly myopic towards the sophisticated choices. Thus, now there is consensus that aftermarket monopolization has potential harms even when consumers are fully informed about the whole lifecycle costs with the competitive primary market.

Following is a list of factors making aftermarket monopolization more harmful.

- High switching cost of original equipment (primary goods)
- Lack of complete contracts (unclear)
- A large number of uninformed customers (exploitable installed base)
- Low quality information (validity)
- Large aftermarket (large installed base)
- High proportion of locked-in customers relative to new customers (also large installed base)
- Weak competition on the primary market (easy to maximise profits)
- High discount rate (incentive to exploit the installed base in order to offset the loss from discount on primary goods)

== See also ==
- Complementary good
- Durable good
