= Election silence =

Ban on political campaigning before or during election

Election silence, or election blackout, is the practice of banning political campaigning or media coverage of a general election, before or during that election. Often, the publication of opinion polls is illegal during this time. In some jurisdictions, such as Slovenia, Poland and Nepal, it is forbidden to try to convince people to vote for a specific candidate or political party on the day of election. Some jurisdictions declare that, legally, election silence violates the right to freedom of speech; however, some countries use it to "balance out the campaigning and maintain a free voting environment". The goal is to give voters a chance to reflect, free of external pressures, before casting their votes. During this period, no active campaigning by the candidates is allowed.

== Overview ==
Election silences are observed in:

- Albania (from 00:00 on the preceding day, and on the election day until the polling stations close)
- Armenia (1 day)
- Argentina (2 days)
- Australia (ban on TV and radio advertising from midnight on the Wednesday before polling day to the close of polls on polling day—always a Saturday)
- Azerbaijan (1 day)
- Bahrain (1 day)
- Barbados (2 days)
- Bosnia and Herzegovina (1 day)
- Brazil (ban on TV and radio advertising from 20:40 on the Thursday before polling day to the close of polls on polling day–always a Sunday; the same applies for runoffs)
- Bulgaria (1 day in advance of polling day and on polling day)
- Cambodia (2 days, on the eve "White Day" and polling day, alcohol selling ban also applied)
- Canada (advertising banned before polls close on polling day)
- Croatia (from 00:00 on the preceding day until the polling stations close)
- Cyprus (2 days)
- Czech Republic (3 days)
- Egypt (2 days)
- Fiji (2 days)
- France (on the Saturday before the Sunday election; polling silence included)
- Greece (2 days)
- Hungary (from 00:00 on the preceding day)
- India (1 to 2 days in advance of polling day and on polling day)
- Indonesia (3 days before voting day)
- Ireland (from 14:00 on the preceding day)
- Israel (from 19:00 on the preceding day) Polls are banned for 5 days before the election. TV and radio ads are banned during campaign beside a concentrated bloc scheduled by the election committee around 2 weeks before the election.
- Italy (from 00:00 on the preceding day), polling banned from 15 days before elections. It is prohibited to say the names of candidates on television in the month before elections (except for TV news programs and regulated electoral advertising)
- Japan (election day)
- Kazakhstan (from 00:00 on the preceding day; releasing opinion polls are prohibited starting from 5 days before the election day)
- Lebanon (starting from zero hours on the day before the parliamentary elections, and until the closing of the polls)
- Malaysia (election day)
- Malta (from 00:00 on the preceding day until the polls close on election day; since elections always fall on a Saturday, this means that the silence period starts on Friday at midnight)
- Moldova (On election day and the day before)
- Montenegro (2 days)
- Mozambique (2 days for campaigning; polling during the entire campaign period)
- Nepal (2 days)
- New Zealand (between 00:00 and 19:00 on election day).
- North Macedonia (from 00:00 on the preceding day)
- Pakistan (1 day)
- Paraguay (2 days)
- Peru (1 day)
- Philippines (on Maundy Thursday up to Good Friday, and from 00:00 on the preceding day up to election day. At this time, political campaigns are prohibited.)
- Poland (from 00:00 on the preceding day, and on the election day as long as the polling stations are open) since 1991
- Portugal (1 day before, and during the election day)
- Russia (1 day)
- Singapore (from 00:00 on the preceding day, and on election day, until polling stations close) called "cooling-off period"
- Serbia (from 00:00 two days before election day)
- Slovakia (2 days, both campaigning and polling)
- Slovenia (from 00:00 on the preceding day, and on the election day until the polling stations close)
- South Korea (Election day; releasing opinion polls are prohibited starting from 6 days before the election day)
- Spain (1 day before election day) called "reflection day". Polling is banned five days before election day, although there are some legal tricks, like publishing abroad
- Sri Lanka (2 days before election day)
- Taiwan (Election day; releasing opinion polls are prohibited starting from 10 days before the election day)
- Thailand (from 18:00 on the preceding day until the polling stations close, alcohol selling ban also applied)
- Tunisia (from 00:00 on the preceding day, and in the election day until the polling stations close)
- Turkey (from 18:00 the day before until polling stations close, alcohol selling ban also applied from 22:00 the night before until polling stations close)
- Ukraine (from 00:00 on the preceding day, prohibition of agitation on polling stations, external commercials and banners should be removed)
- United Kingdom; while polling stations are open, broadcast media cannot report on any campaign activity, and it is forbidden to publish an exit poll or anything resembling one until voting closes. However, candidates and parties can still campaign (and often do so intensively), and print and digital media have no additional reporting restrictions.
- Uruguay (from 00:00 two days before election day)

== By country ==
=== Bulgaria ===
The Constitutional Court of Bulgaria ruled in 2009 that both electoral silence and ban on opinion polls before the election day represented a violation of freedom of speech.

=== Canada ===
It is not permitted to "transmit election advertising to the public in an electoral district on polling day before the close of all of the polling stations in the electoral district". Prior to the 2015 Canadian federal election, the distribution of election results in regions of the country where polls have not yet closed was banned, so results from ridings in the Eastern and Atlantic provinces would not influence results in the west. This was upheld as lawful in a 2007 decision of the Supreme Court, R v Bryan. In January 2012, the Government announced it would repeal the prohibition "[as it] does not make sense with the widespread use of social media and other modern communications technology", upon the urging of the then Chief Electoral Officer, Marc Mayrand. It was repealed by the Fair Elections Act on June 19, 2014.

Although media organisations are not permitted to be present for the count of results or enter any polling rooms, they may shoot video or photos from outside of a polling room as long as the secrecy of the ballot is maintained and access to the room is not impeded. Between 1993 and 1998, the distribution of election surveys 74 hours before election day was banned. This was struck down by the Supreme Court of Canada as violating section 1 of the Canadian Charter of Rights and Freedoms in Thomson Newspapers Co v Canada (AG).

=== Slovenia ===
The Constitutional Court of Slovenia ruled in 2011 that a ban on opinion polls was unconstitutional. Until 2016, any mention of the candidate on the day of election was prohibited. Those who published positive or critical statements about parties or candidates on social media, online forums, or stated them for example in restaurants, were prosecuted and fined. For over two decades, media and voters refrained from talking about politics on the day before the elections and on election day. In 2016, the Supreme Court ruled that "not every opinion is propaganda", published a new definition of the term 'propaganda' and reverted a lower court judgement, which convicted a person who published "Great interview! Worth reading!" on Facebook.

=== Hungary ===
The Constitutional Court of Hungary ruled in 2007 that a ban on opinion polls was unconstitutional, but upheld electoral silence.

=== United States ===
The U.S. Supreme Court ruled in Burson v. Freeman (1992) that campaigning can only be limited on election day in a small area around the polling station. Any broader ban on speech would be unconstitutional.
