= Minnesota Voters Alliance v. Mansky =

- Supreme Court of the United States

Argued February 28, 2018 Decided June 14, 2018
- Full case name: Minnesota Voters Alliance, et al., Petitioners v. Joe Mansky, et al.
- Docket no.: 16-1435
- Citations: 585 U.S. ___ (more) 138 S. Ct. 1876; 201 L. Ed. 2d 201; 86 U.S.L.W. 4401

Case history
- Prior: Minnesota Majority v. Mansky, 849 F.3d 749 (8th Cir. 2017); cert. granted, 138 S. Ct. 446 (2017).

Holding
- Minnesota's ban on political apparel at polling places violates the First Amendment's free speech clause.

Court membership
- Chief Justice John Roberts Associate Justices Anthony Kennedy · Clarence Thomas; Ruth Bader Ginsburg · Stephen Breyer; Samuel Alito · Sonia Sotomayor; Elena Kagan · Neil Gorsuch

Case opinions
- Majority: Roberts, joined by Kennedy, Thomas, Ginsburg, Alito, Kagan, Gorsuch
- Dissent: Sotomayor, joined by Breyer

Minnesota Voters Alliance v. Mansky, 585 U.S. 1 (2018), is a landmark decision of the US Supreme Court concerning the constitutionality of governmental speech restrictions in a polling place venue. The case challenged a century-old Minnesota law that prevents voters from wearing clothing or items considered political while voting. While the Supreme Court previously ruled that political campaigning near polling places may be restricted, the Minnesota law was challenged as overbroad and violative of free speech rights under the First Amendment. On June 14, 2018, the Court ruled by a 7–2 vote that the Minnesota law was overbroad and violated free speech rights and was therefore unconstitutional.

== Background ==
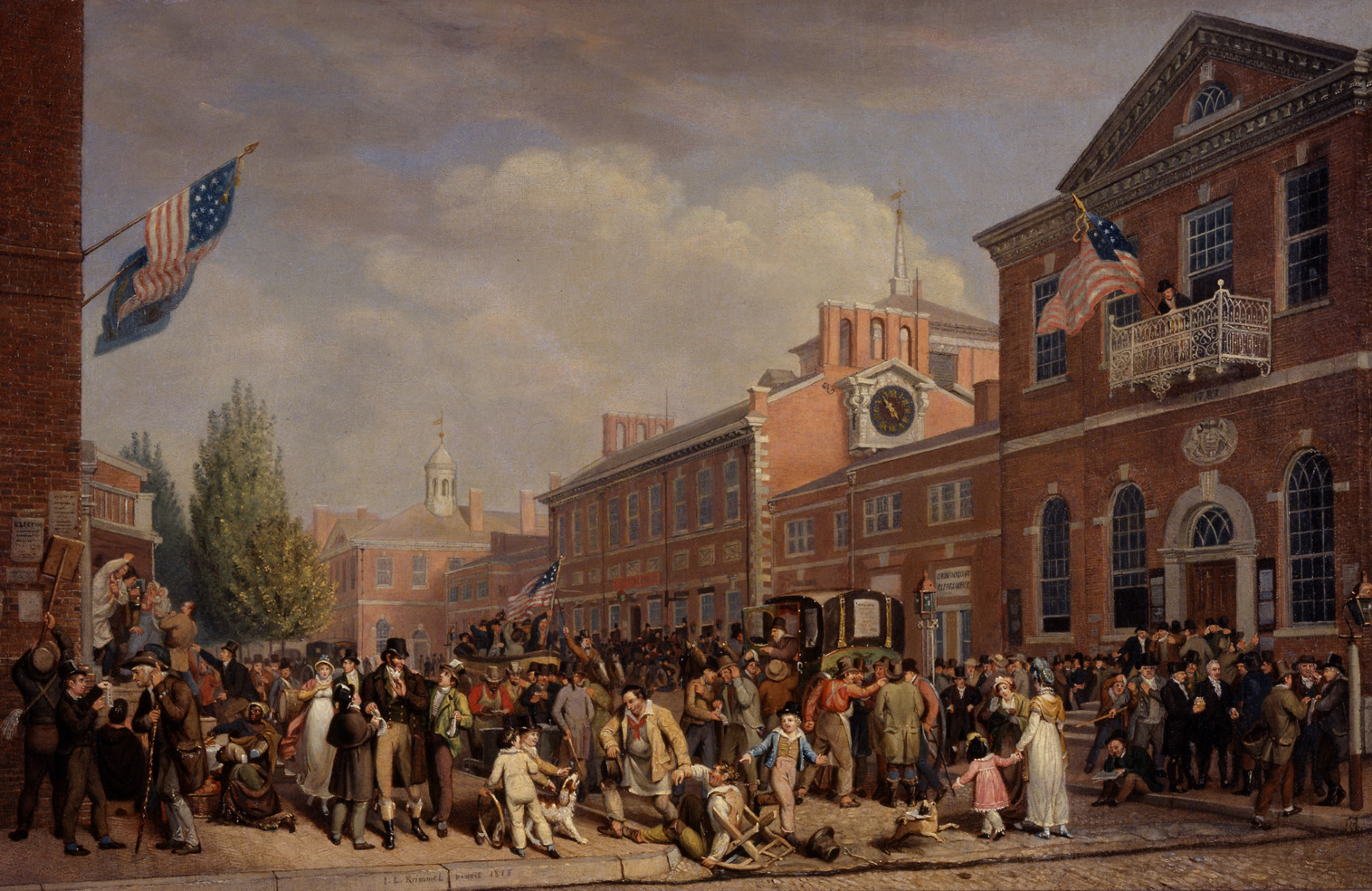
Polling place laws like Minnesota's apparel law, passed near the turn of the 18th century, were designed to remove the interference and intimidation of prior elections.

Prior to the late 19th century, polling places in the United States were far more open and chaotic; voters could be intimidated by campaigners before voting, and there was little privacy for the voter. To deal with this, all states started to pass laws during the late 1800s and early 1900s that transformed polling places into the more ordered affairs in current times, where voters wait in line and have privacy in making and submitting their vote. Several states prohibited any type of campaigning within the polling place. Minnesota's polling place law (Minnesota Statutes Section 211B.11), passed in 1889, included an apparel ban that prevented voters from wearing any type of clothing that bore a "political" message. This was one of the most restrictive laws of this type in the country. Since then, the state has defended the law as a means to make polling places as "an orderly and controlled environment without confusion, interference or distraction". Nine other states have similar bans on what messages can be displayed by voters on their clothing when they vote.

Just prior to the November 2010 election, a group of concerned voters in Minnesota, the Minnesota Voters Alliance (MVA) attempted to get a temporary restraining order on the Minnesota polling apparel ban law for the election, as they wanted to promote their Election Integrity Watch (EIW) goal. EIW asserted that the lack of an identification check before submitting a ballot in a Minnesota election led to voter fraud. They planned on wearing shirts and buttons with their logo "Please I.D. Me". The District Court refused to grant the order. On election day, MVA's executive director Andrew Cilek showed up at a local polling place with both the "Please I.D. Me" button and a Tea Party-branded tee-shirt. Election officials prevented him from voting until he covered these items, but he refused. After a second rejection, Cilek returned with his lawyer, and only then was he given the right to vote, though his information was taken by election officials as to fine him US$300 for his clothing, though this fine was never assessed. Other members of the MVA supporting the EIW with clothing or buttons also reported difficulties in voting that day.

The MVA, Cilik and Susan Jeffers, a former county election judge aligned with MVA, filed a lawsuit against the state, arguing that the apparel ban violates free speech rights under the First Amendment. The plaintiffs were represented pro-bono by Pacific Legal Foundation, a nonprofit, public interest law firm that litigates free speech and other individual rights issues. The District Court agreed with the state to dismiss the case, and on appeal, the United States Court of Appeals for the Eighth Circuit affirmed the dismissal in part, citing an earlier Supreme Court ruling in Burson v. Freeman 504 U.S. 191 (1992). In Burson, the Court upheld the constitutionality of a Tennessee polling law that created a buffer zone around polling places to bar speech "related to a political campaign". The Eighth Circuit argued that Minnesota's apparel law fell in line with Burson, despite arguments from the MVA that Burson "plainly does not endorse a categorical ban on all types of 'political' speech". Part of the case was remanded back to the District Court for review, but ultimately was still affirmed on appeal in favor of the state in 2017.

== Supreme Court ==
MVA et al. petitioned to the Supreme Court for writ of certiorari in May 2017 to review the Eighth Circuit's decision, asking if Minnesota's apparel ban, broadly bans all political apparel at the polling place, facially overbroad under the First Amendment. The petition noted a circuit split amongst the Courts of Appeals related to states regulating political messages at polling places. The Court agreed to hear the case, and oral arguments were heard on February 28, 2018.

The Court announced judgment in favor of the voters on June 14, 2018, voting 7–2 to reverse and remand to the lower court because the Minnesota law was an unconstitutional violation of the First Amendment. Chief Justice John Roberts wrote the majority opinion, joined by Anthony Kennedy, Clarence Thomas, Ruth Bader Ginsburg, Samuel Alito, Elena Kagan and Neil Gorsuch. Roberts found that the Minnesota law is not "capable of reasoned application" of deciding what type of political speech they can prevent, as the term "political" used in the statute may be up for inconsistent interpretation, as demonstrated from past applications of the law and in the case's arguments. While Roberts agreed with the state with the need to uphold decorum in polling places, and that "some forms of advocacy should be excluded from the polling place", the existing Minnesota law failed to "articulate some sensible basis for distinguishing what may come in from what must stay out".

Justice Sonia Sotomayor wrote the dissenting opinion, joined by Stephen Breyer, arguing that the case should have been presented to the Minnesota Supreme Court for a definitive ruling on what was prohibited or not by the apparel law.
