= Allied-Signal, Inc. v. Director =

- Supreme Court of the United States

Decided June 15, 1992
- Full case name: Allied-Signal, Inc. v. Director
- Citations: 504 U.S. 768 (more)

Holding
- If a company is in multiple, independent lines of business in and outside a state, then that state may tax the company's income from in-state activities only.

Court membership
- Chief Justice William Rehnquist Associate Justices Byron White · Harry Blackmun; John P. Stevens · Sandra Day O'Connor; Antonin Scalia · Anthony Kennedy; David Souter · Clarence Thomas

Allied-Signal, Inc. v. Director, 504 U.S. 768 (1992), was a United States Supreme Court case in which the Court held that, if a company is in multiple and independent lines of business in and outside a state, then that state may tax the company's income from in-state activities only.
