= Evans v. United States =

- Supreme Court of the United States

Argued December 9, 1991 Decided May 26, 1992
- Full case name: John H. Evans, Jr., v. United States
- Citations: 504 U.S. 255 (more) 112 S.Ct. 1881, 119 L.Ed.2d 57
- Argument: Oral argument
- Opinion announcement: Opinion announcement

Case history
- Prior: 910 F.2d 790 (CA11 1990)

Holding
- An affirmative act of inducement by a public official, such as a demand, is not an element of the offense of extortion "under color of official right" prohibited by the Hobbs Act.

Court membership
- Chief Justice William Rehnquist Associate Justices Byron White · Harry Blackmun; John P. Stevens · Sandra Day O'Connor; Antonin Scalia · Anthony Kennedy; David Souter · Clarence Thomas

Case opinions
- Majority: Stevens (parts I and II), joined by White, Blackmun, Souter, O'Connor
- Majority: Stevens (part III), joined by White, Blackmun, Souter, Kennedy
- Concurrence: O'Connor (in part and in judgment)
- Concurrence: Kennedy (in part and in judgment)
- Dissent: Thomas, joined by Rehnquist, Scalia

Evans v. United States, 504 U.S. 255 (1992), was a case decided by the Supreme Court of the United States. The court held that, to prove that a public official has committed extortion in violation of the Hobbs Act by accepting a payment, the government is not required to show that the official took an "affirmative act" to induce the payment.
