= Anderson v. Celebrezze =

- Supreme Court of the United States

Argued December 6, 1982 Decided April 19, 1983
- Full case name: John B. Anderson, et al. v. Anthony J. Celebrezze, Jr., Secretary of State of Ohio
- Citations: 460 U.S. 780 (more) 103 S. Ct. 1564; 75 L. Ed. 2d 547; 1983 U.S. LEXIS 145; 51 U.S.L.W. 4375

Case history
- Prior: Certiorari to the United States Court of Appeals for the Sixth Circuit

Holding
- Ohio's early filing deadline places an unconstitutional burden on the voting and associational rights of petitioner Anderson's supporters.

Court membership
- Chief Justice Warren E. Burger Associate Justices William J. Brennan Jr. · Byron White; Thurgood Marshall · Harry Blackmun; Lewis F. Powell Jr. · William Rehnquist; John P. Stevens · Sandra Day O'Connor

Case opinions
- Majority: Stevens, joined by Burger, Brennan, Marshall, Blackmun
- Dissent: Rehnquist, joined by White, Powell, O'Connor

Laws applied
- U.S. Const. amends. I, XIV

Anderson v. Celebrezze, 460 U.S. 780 (1983), was a United States Supreme Court case in which the Court held that Ohio's filing deadline for independent candidates was unconstitutional.

== Background ==
John B. Anderson was a declared candidate for the 1980 presidential election. On May 16, 1980, Anderson's supporters filed a nominating petition to the Ohio Secretary of State's office. Secretary Anthony J. Celebrezze Jr. rejected the petition because it had not been filed by the state's deadline of seventy-five days prior to the presidential primary. At that time, the primary election was held on the Tuesday following the first Monday in June. In 1980, the deadline would have been March 20.

The federal district court ruled that the statute was unconstitutional on two grounds. First, the statute violated the First Amendment to the United States Constitution by placing too high of a burden to petition the government. Second, the deadline was earlier than that required by candidates in the major parties, thereby violating the Equal Protection Clause of the Fourteenth Amendment to the United States Constitution. That decision was later reversed by the United States Court of Appeals, which was itself overturned by the United States Supreme Court.

== Opinion of the Court ==
=== Majority opinion ===
The United States Supreme Court overturned the appellate court's ruling and reinstated that of the district court. Among other points, the majority stated:

An early filing deadline may have a substantial impact on independent-minded voters. In election campaigns, particularly those which are national in scope, the candidates and the issues simply do not remain static over time. Various candidates rise and fall in popularity; domestic and international developments bring new issues to center stage and may affect voters' assessments of national problems. Such developments will certainly affect the strategies of candidates who have already entered the race; they may also create opportunities for new candidates. See A. Bickel, Reform and Continuity 87-89 (1971). Yet Ohio's filing deadline prevents persons who wish to be independent candidates from entering the significant political arena established in the State by a Presidential election campaign - and creating new political coalitions of Ohio voters - at any time after mid-to-late March. 11 At this point developments in campaigns for the major-party nominations have only begun, and the major parties will not adopt their nominees and platforms for another five months. Candidates and supporters within the major parties thus have the political advantage of continued flexibility; for independents, the inflexibility imposed by the March filing deadline is a correlative disadvantage because of the competitive nature of the electoral process. --John Paul Stevens

=== Dissenting opinion ===
The dissenting opinion of the court pointed to Ohio's deadline for partisan candidates, which was the same as that of independent candidates:

Should a candidate decide to seek the nomination of a political party participating in Ohio's primary election by capturing delegate votes for the party's national convention, the candidate must file a declaration of candidacy and a nominating petition bearing signatures from 1,000 members of the party; the filing must occur no later than the 75th day before the first Tuesday after the first Monday in June of the election year... If a candidate chooses to run as a nonparty candidate, he must file, by the same date as a party candidate participating in the primary, a statement of candidacy and a nominating petition bearing the signatures of 5,000 qualified voters. --William H. Rehnquist

The dissent additionally stated that states had discretion in allowing or refusing to allow national candidates on their ballots. In light of a sensible system of petitioning, the Supreme Court should not interfere:

Today the Court holds that the filing deadline for nonparty candidates in this statutory scheme violated the First Amendment rights of 1980 Presidential hopeful John Anderson and Anderson's supporters. Certainly, absent a court injunction ordering that his name be placed on the ballot, Anderson and his supporters would have been injured by Ohio's ballot access requirements; by failing to comply with the filing deadline for nonparty candidates Anderson would have been excluded from Ohio's 1980 general election ballot. But the Constitution does not require that a State allow any particular Presidential candidate to be on its ballot, and so long as the Ohio ballot access laws are rational and allow nonparty candidates reasonable access to the general election ballot, this Court should not interfere with Ohio's exercise of its Art. II, 1, cl. 2, power. --William H. Rehnquist

== See also ==
- McIntyre v. Ohio Elections Commission (1995)
- Burdick v. Takushi (1992), case often cited together with Anderson as the "Anderson-Burdick doctrine"
- List of United States Supreme Court cases, volume 460
