= Exculpatory evidence =

Evidence favorable to the defendant in a criminal trial that tends to exonerate defendant

Exculpatory evidence is evidence favorable to the defendant in a criminal trial that exonerates or tends to exonerate the defendant of guilt. It is the opposite of inculpatory evidence, which tends to present guilt. In many countries, including the United States, police and prosecutors are required to disclose to the defendant exculpatory evidence they possess before the defendant enters a plea (guilty or not guilty). In some countries, such as Germany, the prosecutor has to actively search for both exculpatory and inculpatory circumstances and evidence before filing of action.

Per the Brady v. Maryland (1963) decision, prosecutors in the United States have a duty to disclose exculpatory evidence even if not requested to do so. While the prosecution is not required to search for exculpatory evidence and must disclose only the evidence in its possession, custody, or control, the prosecution's duty is to disclose all information known to any member of its team, e.g., police, investigators, crime labs, et cetera. In Brady v. Maryland, the U.S. Supreme Court held that such a requirement follows from constitutional due process and is consistent with the prosecutor's duty to seek justice. The Brady doctrine is a pretrial discovery rule that was established by the United States Supreme Court in Brady v. Maryland. The rule requires that the prosecution must turn over all exculpatory evidence to the defendant in a criminal case. Exculpatory evidence is evidence that might exonerate the defendant.

== Illustration ==
A victim is murdered by stabbing and a suspect is arrested for the murder. Evidence includes a knife covered with blood found near the victim and the accused found covered in blood at the murder scene. During the investigation, the police interview a witness claiming to have seen the stabbing. The witness makes a statement to the police that another unidentified person committed the crime, not the accused. The witness's statement is exculpatory evidence as it introduces reasonable doubt as to the guilt of the accused. The police either do not believe the witness's account or else find the witness unreliable and choose not to follow up on the lead. The prosecutor is obliged to inform the accused and their attorney of the witness's statement even though the police doubt the witness's version of events. Failure to do so would provide grounds for a motion to dismiss the charges or an appeal of a subsequent guilty verdict.

== See also ==
- Brady disclosure
- Giglio v. United States (1972)
- R v Stinchcombe (1991)
- United States v. Williams (1992)
