= Wyatt v. Cole =

- Supreme Court of the United States

Argued January 14, 1992 Decided May 18, 1992
- Full case name: Wyatt v. Cole
- Citations: 504 U.S. 158 (more)

Holding
- Private citizens are not entitled to qualified immunity from Section 1983 suits over misusing an unconstitutional public process merely because they presumed the process was constitutional.

Court membership
- Chief Justice William Rehnquist Associate Justices Byron White · Harry Blackmun; John P. Stevens · Sandra Day O'Connor; Antonin Scalia · Anthony Kennedy; David Souter · Clarence Thomas

Case opinions
- Majority: O'Connor, joined by White, Blackmun, Stevens, Scalia, Kennedy
- Concurrence: Kennedy, joined by Scalia
- Dissent: Rehnquist, joined by Souter, Thomas

Wyatt v. Cole, 504 U.S. 158 (1992), was a United States Supreme Court case in which the court held that private citizens are not entitled to qualified immunity from Section 1983 suits over misusing an unconstitutional public process merely because they presumed the process was constitutional.
