= United States v. Williams (1992) =

- Supreme Court of the United States

Argued January 22, 1992 Decided May 4, 1992
- Full case name: United States, Petitioner v. John H. Williams, Jr.
- Citations: 504 U.S. 36 (more) 112 S. Ct. 1735; 118 L. Ed. 2d 352; 1992 U.S. LEXIS 2688

Holding
- A district court may not dismiss an otherwise valid indictment because the Government failed to disclose to the grand jury "substantial exculpatory evidence" in its possession.

Court membership
- Chief Justice William Rehnquist Associate Justices Byron White · Harry Blackmun; John P. Stevens · Sandra Day O'Connor; Antonin Scalia · Anthony Kennedy; David Souter · Clarence Thomas

Case opinions
- Majority: Scalia, joined by Rehnquist, White, Kennedy, Souter
- Dissent: Stevens, joined by Blackmun, O'Connor; Thomas (parts II, III)

Laws applied
- U.S. Const. amend. V

United States v. Williams, 504 U.S. 36 (1992), was a U.S. Supreme Court case concerning the presentation of exculpatory evidence to a grand jury. It ruled that the federal courts do not have the supervisory power to require prosecutors to present exculpatory evidence to the grand jury. The opinion was written by Justice Scalia, and the dissent by Justice Stevens.

The question addressed by the court was whether a district court may properly dismiss an indictment when the prosecutor withheld "substantial exculpatory evidence" that could lead the grand jury to reject the indictment but does not necessarily rise to the level of prosecutorial misconduct, which would require the dismissal of an indictment. The significance of the ruling lies not only in its definition of the duty of the prosecutor in regard to presenting exculpatory evidence before the grand jury but also in its definition of the grand jury's accusatory role.

The ruling protects prosecutors who withhold "substantial exculpatory evidence" to obtain an indictment, as the role of the grand jury is not to determine guilt but to decide whether there is enough evidence of a crime; exculpatory evidence can be presented at trial. Justice Stevens's dissent focused on the argument that a prosecutor's failure to present substantially-exculpatory evidence is a form of prosecutorial misconduct, but that nevertheless, the prosecutor need not "ferret out and present all evidence that could be used at trial to create a reasonable doubt as to defendant's guilt."
