= Lujan v. Defenders of Wildlife =

- Supreme Court of the United States

Argued December 3, 1991 Decided June 12, 1992
- Full case name: Manuel Lujan, Jr., Secretary of the Interior, Petitioner v. Defenders of Wildlife, et al.
- Citations: 504 U.S. 555 (more) 112 S. Ct. 2130; 119 L. Ed. 2d 351; 60 U.S.L.W. 4495; 1992 U.S. LEXIS 3543; 34 ERC (BNA) 1785; 92 Cal. Daily Op. Service 4985; 92 Daily Journal DAR 7876; 92 Daily Journal DAR 8967; 22 ELR 20913; 6 Fla. L. Weekly Fed. S 374

Case history
- Prior: Defendant's motion to dismiss granted, Defenders of Wildlife v. Hodel, 658 F. Supp. 43 (D. Minn. 1987); reversed and remanded, 851 F.2d 1035 (8th Cir. 1988); summary judgment granted to plaintiffs, 707 F. Supp. 1082 (D. Minn. 1988); affirmed, sub nom. Defenders of Wildlife v. Lujan, 911 F.2d 117 (8th Cir. 1988); cert. granted, 500 U.S. 915 (1991)

Holding
- Plaintiffs did not have standing to bring suit under the Endangered Species Act, because the threat of a species' extinction alone did not establish an individual and nonspeculative private injury.

Court membership
- Chief Justice William Rehnquist Associate Justices Byron White · Harry Blackmun; John P. Stevens · Sandra Day O'Connor; Antonin Scalia · Anthony Kennedy; David Souter · Clarence Thomas

Case opinions
- Majority: Scalia (Parts I, II, III-A, IV), joined by Rehnquist, White, Kennedy, Souter, Thomas
- Plurality: Scalia (Part III-B), joined by Rehnquist, White, Thomas
- Concurrence: Kennedy (in part and in judgment), joined by Souter
- Concurrence: Stevens (in judgment)
- Dissent: Blackmun, joined by O'Connor

Laws applied
- U.S. Const. Art. III; 16 U.S.C. § 1536 (§ 7 of the Endangered Species Act of 1973)

Lujan v. Defenders of Wildlife, 504 U.S. 555 (1992), is a landmark Supreme Court of the United States decision that heightened standing requirements under Article III of the United States Constitution. It is "one of the most influential cases in modern environmental standing jurisprudence."

Lily Henning of the Legal Times stated that:

In [this] decision, hailed by the right and attacked by the left as well as by a broad swath of legal scholars, the Court made clear that plaintiffs must suffer a concrete, discernible injury—not a "conjectural or hypothetical one"—to be able to bring suit in federal court. It, in effect, made it more difficult for plaintiffs to challenge the actions of a government agency when the actions don't directly affect them.

In Lujan, the Court held that a group of American wildlife conservation and other environmental organizations lacked standing to challenge regulations jointly issued by the U.S. Secretaries of the Interior and Commerce, regarding the geographic area to which a particular section of the Endangered Species Act of 1973 applied. The case arose over issues of US funding of development projects in Aswan, Egypt and Mahaweli, Sri Lanka that could harm endangered species in the affected areas. The government declared that the act did not apply to projects outside of the United States and Defenders of Wildlife sued.

== Opinion ==
In Scalia's interpretation of Article III of the Constitution, plaintiffs must demonstrate that they have suffered an injury in fact, caused by the defendant, which a favorable court decision could redress, to meet the standing requirement to bring a case before the court. In his opinion for the majority, Justice Scalia stated that Defenders had failed to satisfy the “injury in fact” element. He wrote that the Court rejected the view that the citizen suit provision of the statute conferred upon “all persons an abstract, self-contained, non-instrumental ‘right’ to have the Executive observe the procedures required by law." Rather, he explained, an American citizen plaintiff must have suffered a tangible and particular harm.

Additionally, in the portion of his opinion that garnered only plurality support, Justice Scalia determined that the plaintiffs failed to demonstrate the redressability element.

In his opinion concurring in part, Justice Anthony Kennedy, joined by Justice David Souter, asserted that an airline ticket to the affected geographic areas with endangered species in question would have been enough to satisfy the imminent threat of future injury requirement.

Justice John Paul Stevens concurred in the judgement as well, but disagreed with the Court's finding that Defenders lacked standing. Justice Stevens instead rested his opinion on a statutory construction of the Endangered Species Act.

Justice Harry Blackmun, joined by Justice Sandra Day O'Connor, dissented from the majority, stating first that the respondents have raised genuine issues of fact, and second that the majority opinion imposed new limitations to bringing suit.

== See also ==
- Standing (law)
- Endangered Species Act of 1973
- Environmental policy of the United States
- List of United States Supreme Court cases, volume 504
