= Ankenbrandt v. Richards =

- Supreme Court of the United States

Argued March 31, 1992 Decided June 15, 1992
- Full case name: ANKENBRANDT, as next friend and mother of L. R., et al. v. RICHARDS et al.
- Docket no.: 91-367
- Citations: 504 U.S. 689 (more) 112 S. Ct. 2206, 119 L. Ed. 2d 468
- Argument: Oral argument
- Opinion announcement: Opinion announcement

Case history
- Prior: Dismissed, 1990 WL 211545 (E.D. La. Dec. 10, 1990); Judgment affirmed, 934 F.2d 1262 (5th Cir. 1991)

Holding
- Notwithstanding the traditional exception to diversity jurisdiction prohibiting federal courts from hearing domestic relations cases, federal courts may hear money damages suits between former spouses.

Court membership
- Chief Justice William Rehnquist Associate Justices Byron White · Harry Blackmun; John P. Stevens · Sandra Day O'Connor; Antonin Scalia · Anthony Kennedy; David Souter · Clarence Thomas

Case opinions
- Majority: White, joined by Rehnquist, O'Connor, Scalia, Kennedy, Souter
- Concurrence: Blackmun
- Concurrence: Stevens, joined by Thomas

Laws applied
- Article Three of the United States Constitution, 28 U.S.C. § 1332

Ankenbrandt v. Richards, 504 U.S. 689 (1992), was a United States Supreme Court case in which the Court held that, notwithstanding the traditional exception to diversity jurisdiction prohibiting federal courts from hearing domestic relations cases, federal courts may hear money damages suits between former spouses. In Ankenbrandt, a woman, as next friend of her two daughters, sued her ex-husband and his “female companion” for abusing the children of the marriage. The mother filed suit in federal court, requesting money damages.

In the proceedings below, both the federal district court and the federal appellate court held that federal courts did not have jurisdiction to hear domestic relations cases, and that therefore, the case had to be dismissed. The Supreme Court, however, reversed. The Supreme Court held long-established precedent makes clear that federal courts do not have jurisdiction to hear domestic relations cases. However, the Supreme Court held that a civil tort suit filed by a mother against her former husband and his female companion was not a domestic relations case, and therefore, federal courts had jurisdiction to hear the case.

== Background ==
=== History ===
In 1859, in Barber v. Barber, the U.S. Supreme Court had held that federal courts did not have jurisdiction to hear divorce or alimony cases. However, Barber held that a federal court did have jurisdiction to enforce an alimony decree entered in state court. But Barber did not clearly articulate its reasons for this holding. Three justices dissented. The dissenters agreed that federal courts could not hear divorce or alimony cases, but the dissenters thought that federal courts should not enforce alimony decrees entered in state courts, either. The congressional statute then in force authorized federal courts to hear "suits of a civil nature at common law or in equity" between citizens of different states. The dissenters in Barber argued that because courts of chancery in England could not hear divorce or alimony cases, and “the jurisdiction of the courts of the United States in chancery is bounded by that of the chancery in England”, U.S. federal courts therefore had no jurisdiction to hear divorce or alimony cases. Later on, in In re Burrus, the Supreme Court held that federal courts also did not have jurisdiction to hear child custody cases. Other cases decided between 1859 and 1992 had also reiterated the holding that federal courts do not have jurisdiction over domestic relations cases.

=== Lower courts ===
On September 26, 1989, Carol Ankenbrandt filed suit against her former husband, Jon A. Richards, and his female companion, Debra Kesler in the United States District Court for the Eastern District of Louisiana. Ankenbrandt alleged that Richards and Kesler had molested her two minor children, and she sought over $9.8 million in damages. Ankenbrandt argued that the federal court had jurisdiction; she cited 28 U.S.C. § 1332, which (at the time) held that federal courts may hear "all civil actions" between citizens of different states where the amount in controversy exceeded $50,000. Ankenbrandt contended that because she and her children lived in Missouri, and Richards and Kesler lived in Louisiana, the federal court had jurisdiction.

The federal district court, however, dismissed Ankenbrandt’s suit; the federal court held that it did not have jurisdiction because federal courts do not have jurisdiction to hear domestic relations cases. The federal court also cited the "abstention doctrine" in Younger v. Harris, which held that even if a federal court has jurisdiction to hear a particular case, the federal court should abstain from hearing the case if the federal court’s hearing the case would interfere with a pending state court case.

Ankenbrandt then appealed to the United States Court of Appeals for the Fifth Circuit. The Fifth Circuit affirmed the district court’s holding that the federal court did not have jurisdiction to hear Ankenbrandt’s suit because of the domestic relations exception to federal court jurisdiction. Ankenbrandt then appealed to the U.S. Supreme Court. The U.S. Supreme Court granted certiorari on the following questions:

(1) Is there a domestic relations exception to federal jurisdiction?

(2) If so, does it permit a district court to abstain from exercising diversity jurisdiction over a tort action for damages?

(3) Did the District Court in this case err in abstaining from exercising jurisdiction under the doctrine of Younger v. Harris?

== Opinion of the Court ==
=== Arguments ===
Richard Lynn Ducote represented Ankenbrandt. Paul S. Weidenfeld represented Richards and Kesler. The American Civil Liberties Union filed an amicus brief in support of Ankenbrandt.

Ankenbrandt’s lawyer argued that there should be no domestic relations exception to federal court jurisdiction. He argued that as long as a case is between citizens of different states and the amount in controversy exceeds $50,000, a federal court should exercise jurisdiction “unless Congress determines otherwise.” Richards and Kesler’s lawyer argued that a federal court should not exercise jurisdiction in a case that has any issues that concern domestic relations.

=== Opinion ===
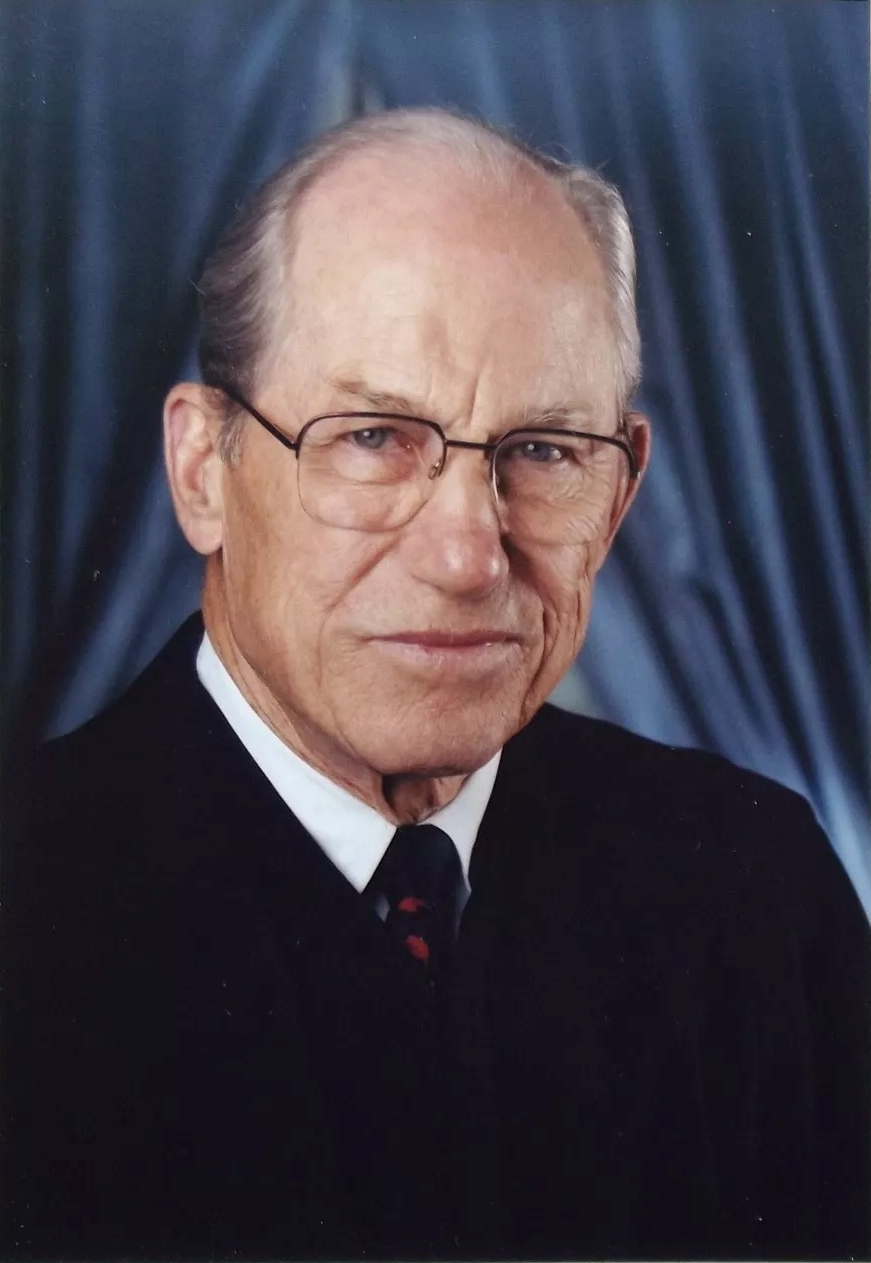
Justice Byron White, author of the opinion

Justice Byron White delivered the opinion of the Court. White’s opinion held that federal courts do not have jurisdiction to hear cases about divorce, alimony, or child custody. White recounted that the dissent in Barber argued that the domestic relations exception existed because the congressional statute then in force had authorized federal courts to hear “all suits of a civil nature at common law or in equity.” White noted that the Barber dissent further contended that because English courts of chancery could not hear domestic relations cases, U.S. federal courts could not hear domestic relations cases either, because the jurisdiction of U.S. federal courts in chancery was the same as the jurisdiction of English courts in chancery. White pointed out that the Barber majority did not disagree with any of the dissent’s language regarding the jurisdiction of U.S. federal courts in chancery and English courts in chancery, and that therefore one could fairly conclude that the domestic relations exception to federal court jurisdiction rested on the principles articulated in the dissent.

White also stated that following Barber, many other U.S. Supreme Court cases continued to hold that federal courts had no jurisdiction to hear domestic relations cases. White observed that until 1948, Congress did not change the language of the relevant statute on federal court jurisdiction. White believed that Congress’ failure to amend this statute demonstrated “Congress' apparent acceptance” of the Supreme Court’s articulation of the domestic relations exception.

White then observed that when Congress amended the federal court jurisdictional statute in 1948, Congress replaced the phrase “all suits of a civil nature at common law or in equity” with the words “all civil actions.” White believed that

When Congress amended the diversity statute in 1948 … we presume Congress did so with full cognizance of the Court's nearly century-long interpretation of the prior statutes, which had construed the statutory diversity jurisdiction to contain an exception for certain domestic relations matters. … we presume, absent any indication that Congress intended to alter this exception … that Congress "adopt[ed] that interpretation" when it reenacted the diversity statute.

White also perceived that there were sound policy reasons for federal courts not to hear domestic relations cases. White wrote that in divorce cases, courts often had to deploy social workers to monitor compliance, and that federal courts do not have “the close association with state and local government organizations dedicated to handling issues that arise out of conflicts over divorce, alimony, and child custody decrees.” Also, White argued that state courts have developed “special proficiency” to hear divorce, custody, and alimony cases, and are therefore better suited than federal courts to hear such cases.

However, White held that courts should apply the domestic relations exception narrowly. White noted that Ankenbrandt was not a case in which any party sought divorce, alimony, or custody of children; rather, Ankenbrandt was merely a civil tort case in which a woman, suing as next friend of her minor children, sought money damages against her ex-husband and the ex-husband’s female companion. In a footnote, White wrote,

The courts below offered no explanation, and we are aware of none, why the domestic relations exception applies at all to respondent Kesler, who would appear to stand in the same position with respect to Ankenbrandt as any other opponent in a tort suit brought in federal court pursuant to diversity jurisdiction.

Therefore, White ruled that a federal court had jurisdiction to hear Ankenbrandt’s suit.

=== Concurrences ===
The Court’s judgment in Ankenbrandt was unanimous. However, Justices Blackmun, Stevens, and Thomas, wrote concurrences, agreeing with the Court’s judgment but disagreeing with the reasons for its holding.

==== Blackmun ====
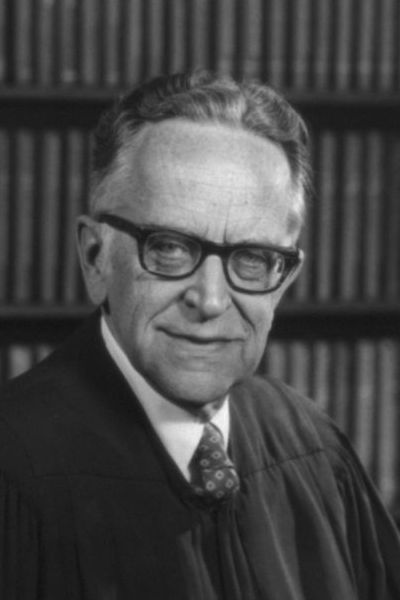
Justice Harry Blackmun, the author of a concurring opinion in Ankenbrandt

Justice Blackmun agreed that federal courts should not hear domestic relations cases. However, in contrast to Justice White, Blackmun did not believe that any federal statute prohibited federal courts from hearing domestic relations cases. Blackmun believed that instead, federal courts should decline to hear domestic relations cases under the “abstention doctrine” under which federal courts choose not to hear certain cases over which the federal courts do have jurisdiction. Blackmun noted that “modern doctrines of federal abstention … distinguish the refusal to exercise jurisdiction from disclaiming jurisdiction altogether.”

However, Blackmun agreed with the Court’s majority that the federal district court should have heard Ankenbrandt’s suit. Blackmun wrote:

Whether or not the domestic relations "exception" is properly grounded in principles of abstention or principles of jurisdiction, I do not believe this case falls within the exception. This case only peripherally involves the subject of "domestic relations." … None of this Court's prior cases that consider the domestic relations "exception" involves the type of periphery domestic relations claim at issue here.

Blackmun also opined that the district court was wrong to abstain under Younger v. Harris, because Younger held that federal courts should abstain from interfering with a pending state court case. Blackmun believed that Younger provided no basis for abstention in Ankenbrandt, because in Ankenbrandt, there was no pending state court case.

==== Stevens, joined by Thomas ====
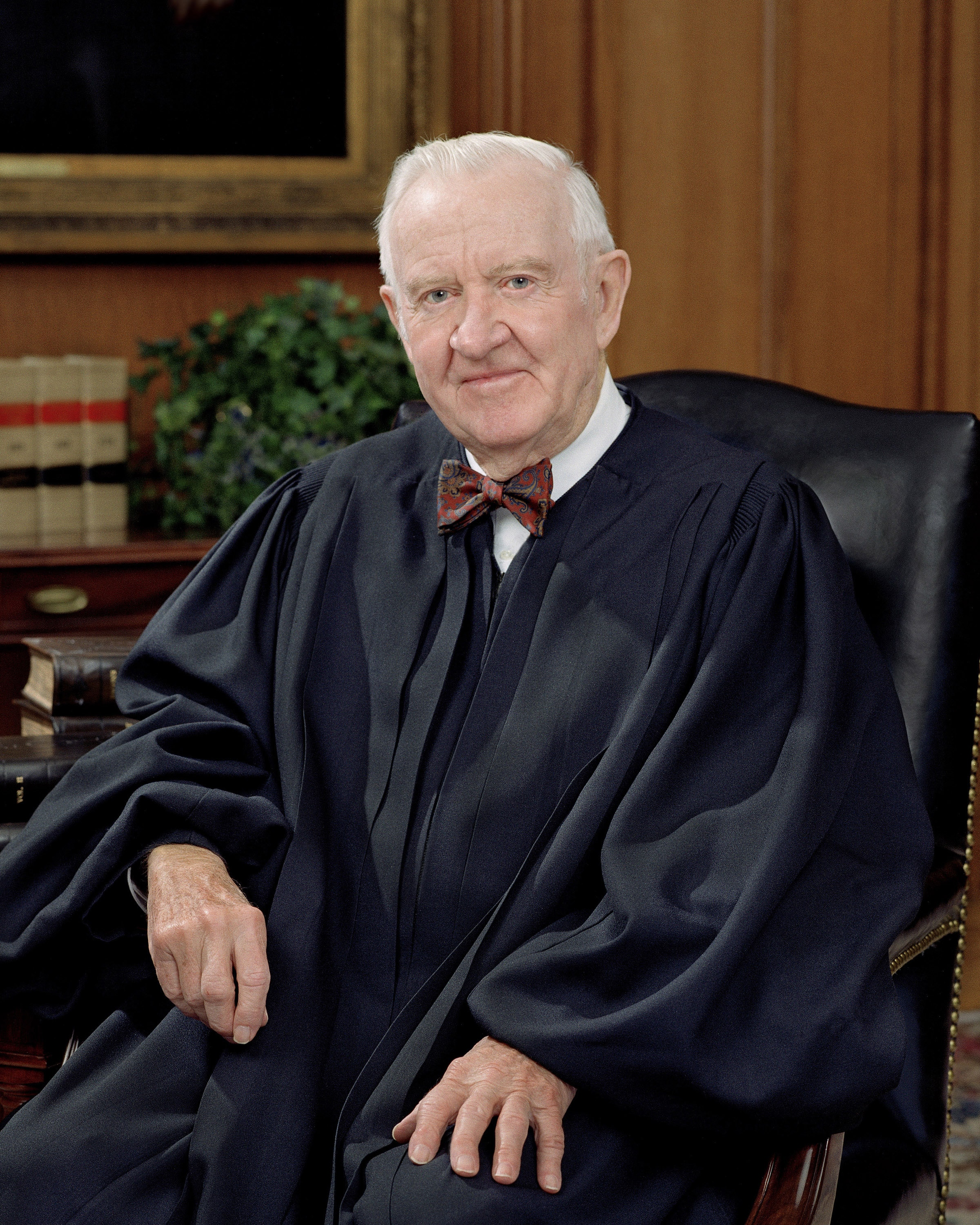
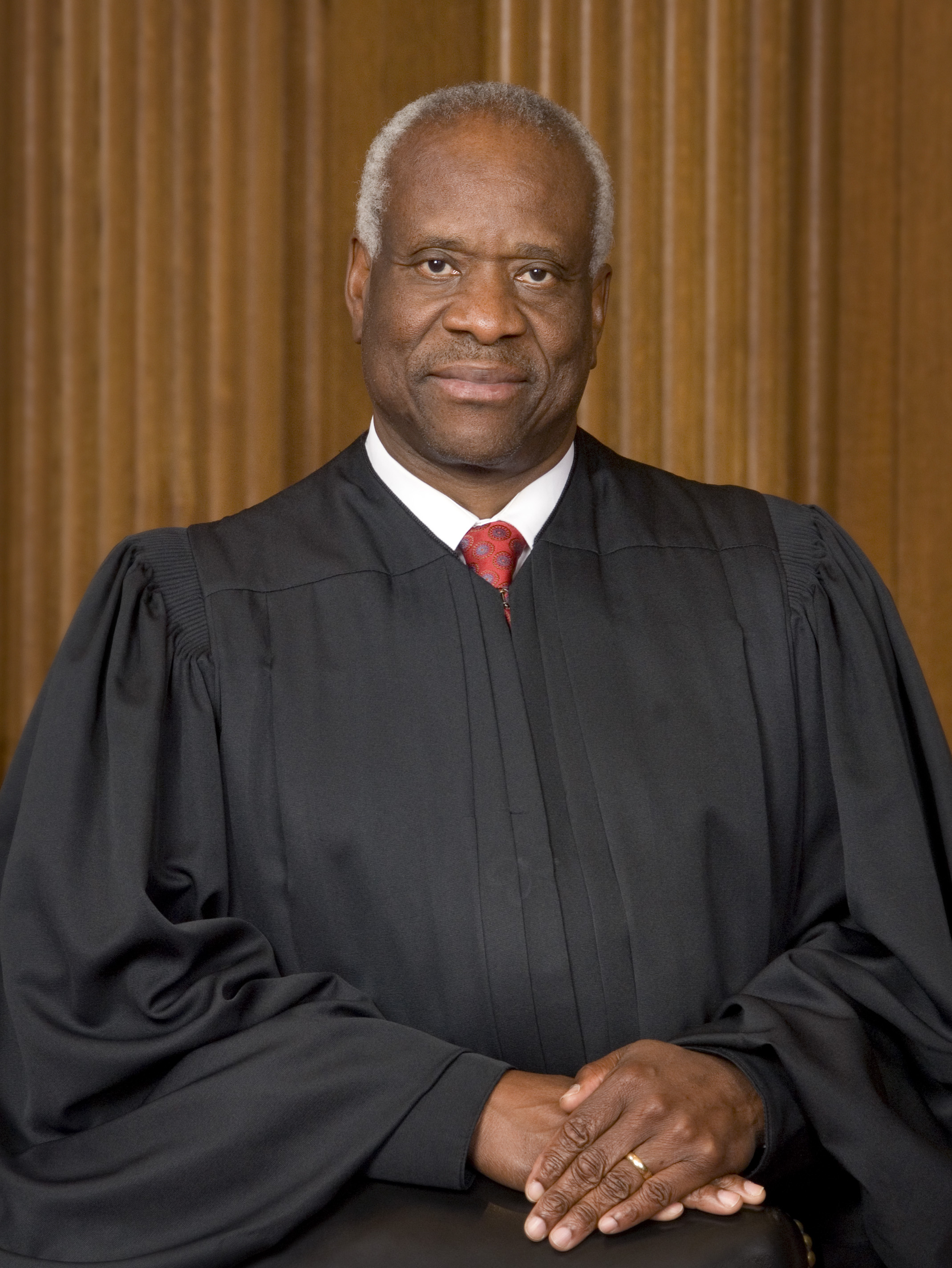
Justices John Paul Stevens (left) and Clarence Thomas (right), who concurred in Ankenbrandt v. Richards

In a brief, one-paragraph opinion, Stevens wrote that, because Ankenbrandt was not a domestic relations case, but a tort case, the Court did not need to discuss the domestic relations exception at all. Stevens stated:

I would leave for another day consideration of whether any domestic relations cases necessarily fall outside of the jurisdiction of the federal courts and of what, if any, principle would justify such an exception to federal jurisdiction. As I agree that this case does not come within any domestic relations exception that might exist, I concur in the judgment.

== Subsequent developments ==
Various federal courts have applied Ankenbrandt in determining whether or not a particular case falls under the domestic relations exception. In the Ninth Circuit, in Bailey v. MacFarland, a woman and her husband had divorced, and the divorce decree provided that the wife would receive a portion of her husband’s share in a corporation the husband owned. Subsequent to the divorce, the husband claimed that he did not own any interest in the corporation, and thus the now ex-wife would receive nothing. The ex-wife sued her ex-husband and the corporation for fraud and conspiracy in federal court. The federal district court held that it had no jurisdiction under the domestic relations exception, because the fraud and conspiracy claims were "inextricably intertwined with the parties' divorce proceeding". The Ninth Circuit affirmed.

The Seventh Circuit cited Ankenbrandt in Friedlander v. Friedlander. In Friedlander, a husband and wife divorced. After the divorce, the ex-husband (Friedlander) told his ex-wife, Maris Freed, and her father, Zangwill Freed, that Zangwill was not really Maris’ father. Zangwill and Maris both sued the ex-husband for intentional infliction of emotional distress in federal court. The federal district court held that the domestic relations exception barred the parties from litigating the claim in federal court. But the Seventh Circuit reversed the district court, holding that the intentional infliction of emotional distress claim fell outside the “penumbra” of the domestic relations exception. Judge Richard Posner, speaking for the Court, wrote:

Had Mr. Friedlander murdered his former father-in-law, the ensuing suit for wrongful death would not have been conducted by a domestic relations court as an ancillary proceeding to the original divorce case; and it makes no difference that, happily, he did not behave quite so egregiously.

The Eighth Circuit considered the domestic relations exception in Wallace v. Wallace. In Wallace, the parties were going through a state court divorce proceeding which had not yet been finalized. While the divorce was pending, the husband sued the wife in federal court; the husband alleged that his wife committed identity theft against him by opening credit card accounts in his name. The Eighth Circuit held that the identify theft claim was “inextricably entwined” with the divorce case, and that therefore, the domestic relations exception prohibited the federal courts from hearing the case.
