= Burdick v. Takushi =

- Supreme Court of the United States

Argued March 24, 1992 Decided June 8, 1992
- Full case name: Alan B. Burdick v. Morris Takushi
- Citations: 504 U.S. 428 (more)

Case history
- Prior: Burdick v. Takushi, 846 F.2d 587 (9th Cir. 1988) Burdick v. Takushi, 70 Haw. 498, 776 P.2d 824, 825 (1989) Burdick v. Takushi, 737 F. Supp. 582 (D. Haw. 1990) 937 F.2d 415 (9th Cir. 1991)

Holding
- A Hawaii election law barring write-in voting does not violate the First and Fourteenth Amendments.

Court membership
- Chief Justice William Rehnquist Associate Justices Byron White · Harry Blackmun; John P. Stevens · Sandra Day O'Connor; Antonin Scalia · Anthony Kennedy; David Souter · Clarence Thomas

Case opinions
- Majority: White, joined by Rehnquist, O'Connor, Scalia, Souter, Thomas
- Dissent: Kennedy, joined by Blackmun, Stevens

Laws applied
- Hawaii Revised Statute 12-1, 12-2, 16-25, First Amendment, Fourteenth Amendment

Burdick v. Takushi, 504 U.S. 428 (1992), was a U.S. Supreme Court case in which the court held that various Hawaii laws which worked to effectively prohibit write-in voting were not in violation of the First Amendment and the Fourteenth Amendment. The court reasoned that under Hawaii's election laws, it was relatively easy to sign up and be nominated for an election, and that the only reasonable fault is on candidates who fail to navigate that process.

== Historical background ==
In June 1986, Alan Burdick, a citizen of Hawaii, wrote to the director of Hawaii's Office of Elections, Morris Takushi, and Hawaii's lieutenant governor, John Waiheʻe, informing them of his desire to write-in a candidate in the upcoming September primary and general election for the Hawaii House of Representatives. After consulting with the attorney general of Hawaii, the pair informed Burdick that Hawaii's election laws did not allow for write-in voting, and his attempts would be discarded.

Burdick, an attorney, then decided to file a lawsuit in the U.S. District Court of Hawaii, which ruled in favor of Burdick and found the law violated Burdick's First Amendment right to freedom of association and expression, and even issued a preliminary injunction forcing Hawaii to allow write-in votes.

=== 1988 court of appeals ruling ===
The district court's decision was quickly appealed, and the U.S. Court of Appeals for the Ninth Circuit entered a stay following its review. The court held oral arguments on August 13, 1987, and released its decision on May 17, 1988. Circuit Judge William Norris wrote for the court, which held that the district court erred in ruling on the issue because it was "unclear whether Hawaii's election laws prohibit write-in voting." It further held,

"Under the circumstances, a definitive resolution of the unsettled question whether Hawaii's election laws actually prohibit write-in voting might obviate the need for a federal court to decide the federal constitution question...[a]ccordingly, we vacate the district court's judgment and remand with instructions to abstain from deciding the federal constitutional issue in this case pending a determination by the state courts of the question whether Hawaii election laws permit write-in voting."

The district court then certified a slate of questions to the Supreme Court of Hawaii regarding to the issues of state law. They returned the following answers:

(1) Does the Constitution of the State of Hawaii require Hawaii's election officials to permit the casting of write-in votes and require Hawaii's election officials to count and publish write-in votes?

Answer. No.

(2) Do Hawaii's election laws require Hawaii's election officials to permit the casting of write-in votes and require Hawaii's election officials to count and publish write-in votes?

Answer. No.

(3) Do Hawaii's election laws permit, but not require, Hawaii's election officials to allow voters to cast write-in votes, and to count and publish write-in votes?

Answer. No.

With the three answers being in the negative, this allowed the district court to rule on the federal constitutional question, which it then did.

=== District court ruling ===
The district court then undertook the federal question, and Chief Judge Harold Fong released his opinion on May 10, 1990. Judge Fong ruled in favor of Burdick and granted summary judgement in favor of the plaintiff, ruling,

"The State may not unduly burden the freedom of choice which a voter exercises in the voting booth. A ban on write-in voting directly burdens the voter's right to freely vote for the candidate of his choice by completely precluding that voter's choice. This burden is of a significant magnitude given the importance of the right impaired."

The court also rejected Hawaii's arguments regarding the state's "main interests" and justifications for banning write-in voting. The state presented the arguments that it was justified for the following interests: "(1) the interest in avoiding factionalism or confining intra-party feuds, (2) the interest in fostering an informed electorate, and (3) the interest in protecting the primary mandate." The court ultimately stated on the raised justifications,

"The State cites several cases to demonstrate that the interests it asserts as justifications for the ban on write-in voting are compelling and necessary, but none of the cases it relies upon ever squarely addressed the issue of write-in voting that this court faces."

Hawaii appealed the decision once more to the court of appeals.

=== 1991 court of appeals ruling ===
The court of appeals held oral arguments on November 5, 1990, and originally released its decision on March 1, 1991, but then decided to withdraw its opinion. It also further denied a petition for rehearing and a suggestion for an en banc hearing. Judge Robert Beezer delivered the second opinion, which ruled in favor of Hawaii, reversing the district court's decision. The court found that,

"To determine whether the prohibition on write-in voting burdens the fundamental right of participating equally in the election of those who govern, we must look at the Hawaii election laws as a whole. Hawaii election laws provide candidates with considerable ease of access to the ballot and demonstrate a minimal amount of support to be placed on the ballot..." and "Although the voter has a protected right to voice his opinion and attempt to influence others, he has no guarantee that he can voice any particular opinion through the ballot-box...Burdick's asserted right to vote for any candidate he chooses does not implicate fundamental constitutional protections."

The court also agreed with Hawaii's assertion of substantial interest in banning write-in votes, saying that,

"The prohibition on write-in voting serves that interest by ensuring that sore losers do not sidestep the ballot access requirements and by ensuring that voters do not sidestep Hawaii's ban on cross-over voting. Hawaii also asserts that it has an interest in protecting the election process from late blooming candidates [and] in fostering an informed and educated electorate. The prohibition on write-in voting serves that interest by ensuring that candidates place themselves on the ballot in time to allow the electorate an ample opportunity to examine the candidates' positions and qualifications.The final interest advanced by Hawaii is its interest in protecting the primary mandate [and] [t]he prohibition on write-in voting ensures that a candidate "seated" after the primary is not challenged in the general election by a write-in candidate."

The Ninth Circuit also declined to follow a U.S. Court of Appeals for the Fourth Circuit decision, Dixon v. Maryland State Administrative Bd. of Election Laws, 878 F.2d 776 (4th Cir. 1989), which found that "the casting and counting of write-in votes implicates fundamental rights." The court also rejected Hawaii's arguments that the district court failed to give "full faith and credit" to the Hawaii Supreme Court.

Burdick then filed a petition for a writ of certiorari to the U.S. Supreme Court.

== Supreme Court decision ==
The Supreme Court granted the petition, and held oral arguments on March 24, 1992, and released its decision on June 8, 1992. Justice Byron White delivered the opinion of the court, with Justice Anthony Kennedy writing a dissenting opinion. The court ruled in favor of Hawaii, holding that "any burden imposed by Hawaii's write-in vote prohibition is a very limited one."

It reasoned that Burdick's arguments which favored a strict scrutiny interpretation of any burden upon the right to vote were "erroneous" and "to require that the regulation be narrowly tailored to advance a compelling state interest...would tie the hands of States seeking to assure that elections are operated equitably and efficiently." The court further states,

"It seems to us that limiting the choice of candidates to those who have complied with state election law requirements is the prototypical example of a regulation that, while it affects the right to vote, is eminently reasonable. Indeed, the foregoing leads us to conclude that when a State's ballot access laws pass constitutional muster as imposing only reasonable burdens on First and Fourteenth Amendment rights...a prohibition on write-in voting will be presumptively valid..."

=== Kennedy's dissent ===
Justice Anthony Kennedy filed a dissenting opinion, in which Justices Harry Blackmun and John Paul Stevens joined. Justice Kennedy reasoned that the "record demonstrates the significant burden that Hawaii's write-in ban imposes on the right of voters...to vote for the candidates of their choice." He further argued,

"In the election that triggered this lawsuit, petitioner did not wish to vote for the one candidate who ran for state representative in his district. Because he could not write in the name of a candidate he preferred, he had no way to cast a meaningful vote. Large numbers of voters cast blank ballots in uncontested races, that is, they leave the ballots blank rather than vote for the single candidate listed. Given that so many Hawaii voters are dissatisfied with the choices available to them, it is hard to avoid the conclusion that at least some voters would cast write-in votes for other candidates if given this option."

He also refutes the majority's justification for Hawaii's ban, that being easy ballot access, by stating,

"Hawaii's ballot access laws taken as a whole impose a significant impediment to third-party or independent candidacies. The majority suggests that it is easy for new parties to petition for a place on the primary ballot because they must obtain the signatures of only one percent of the State's registered voters. This ignores the difficulty presented by the early deadline for gathering these signatures: 150 days (5 months) before the primary election. Meeting this deadline requires considerable organization at an early stage in the election, a condition difficult for many small parties to meet."

Justice Kennedy also further goes on to discuss the history of write-in voting and pre prepared ballots and refutes the state interests raised by Hawaii. He ends off by writing,

"In sum, the State's proffered justifications for the write-in prohibition are not sufficient under any standard to justify the significant impairment of the constitutional rights of voters such as petitioner. I would grant him relief."

== See also ==
- Anderson v. Celebrezze (1983), often cited with the Burdick decision as the "Anderson-Burdick doctrine"
