= Burson v. Freeman =

- Supreme Court of the United States

Argued October 8, 1991 Decided May 26, 1992
- Full case name: Burson v. Freeman
- Citations: 504 U.S. 191 (more) 112 S. Ct. 1846; 119 L. Ed. 2d 5

Case history
- Prior: Freeman v. Burson, 802 S.W.2d 210 (Tenn. 1990); cert. granted, 499 U.S. 958 (1991).

Holding
- Tennessee's statute restricting electioneering in a 100-foot radius around polling places did not violate the First Amendment

Court membership
- Chief Justice William Rehnquist Associate Justices Byron White · Harry Blackmun; John P. Stevens · Sandra Day O'Connor; Antonin Scalia · Anthony Kennedy; David Souter · Clarence Thomas

Case opinions
- Plurality: Blackmun, joined by Rehnquist, White, Kennedy
- Concurrence: Scalia (in judgment)
- Concurrence: Kennedy
- Dissent: Stevens, joined by O'Connor, Souter
- Thomas took no part in the consideration or decision of the case.

Burson v. Freeman, 504 U.S. 191 (1992), was a United States Supreme Court case in which the Court held that a Tennessee law that restricted political campaigning within 100 feet (30 m) of a polling place did not violate the First Amendment.

== Background ==
Prior to the late 19th century, polling places lacked the privacy and decorum of more contemporary times, with campaigners allowed to directly speak to voters as they were submitting their ballots on election day, leading to voter intimidation. From the end of the 19th century into the 20th century, many states passed laws that restricted the type of activities that could be conducted around polling places. One typical law that was enacted by forty-seven states established a proximity around the polling place where political campaigning and electioneering were banned. Tennessee was one such state, which by Tennessee Code §§ 2-7-111(b) prevented campaigning - through verbal speech, signs, pamphlets, or other materials - within 100 feet (30 m) of a polling place.

In the lead-up to the 1987 election, Mary Freeman was the treasurer for the campaign for a candidate for the Metropolitan Council of Nashville and Davidson County. She filed a suit within the Tennessee Chancery Courts to seek an injunction to permanently block enforcement of TCA §§ 2-7-111(b), arguing it was unconstitutional for violating the free speech rights by the First Amendment of the United States Constitution as well as the Constitution of Tennessee. The Chancery judge ruled to dismiss the complaint, finding that the statute did not violate either federal or state law, as it served a compelling state interest to avoid voter intimidation. The case was appealed to the Tennessee Supreme Court, which ruled 4–1 to overturn the lower court decision, and ruled the statute unconstitutional. The Tennessee Supreme Court ruled that while the state did have a compelling interest to prevent voter intimidation within the polling place, it did not have a similar case for the 100-ft space around the polling place; if the state wished to prevent voter intimidation, they could enforce this at the entrances of the polling place, the court argued. Further, the court believed that as long as the polling place was free of political campaigning, voters would not be deterred by last-minute campaigning before they entered the polling place.

== Supreme Court ==
State Attorney General Charles Burson petitioned the United States Supreme Court for writ of certiorari, asking whether the Tennessee 100-ft radius statute violated the First Amendment. The Court agreed to hear the case and heard oral arguments on October 8, 1991. The case was heard before Justice Clarence Thomas was formally appointed to the Supreme Court, and he did not participate in the subsequent decisions.

The Court issued its decision on May 26, 1992, ruling by a 5–3 vote that the Tennessee 100-ft statute did not violate the First Amendment, reversing the lower court's judgement. The majority opinion was written by Justice Harry Blackmun, and joined by Justices William Rehnquist, Byron White and Anthony Kennedy. Blackmun wrote in his opinion that "We simply do not view the question whether the 100-foot boundary line could be somewhat tighter as a question of constitutional dimension...The state of Tennessee has decided that these last 15 seconds before its citizens enter the polling place should be their own, as free from interference as possible. We do not find that this is an unconstitutional choice." Justice Antonin Scalia concurred in a separate opinion, arguing that Tennessee would not need a compelling reason to issue a "viewpoint-neutral" restriction on free speech.

Justice John Paul Stevens wrote the dissent, joined by Justices Sandra Day O'Connor and David H. Souter. Stevens believed that the state had not shown a compelling reason to restrict free speech in the 100-ft radius.

== Impact ==
The Court's decision in Burson would later be referenced in a 2018 Supreme Court case, Minnesota Voters Alliance v. Mansky (Docket 16–1435). In Minnesota Voters Alliance (MVA), the Court was presented with a challenge to a Minnesota law that restricted voters from wearing items of clothing with "political" messages. The law was challenged as unconstitutionally violating free speech rights. The lower courts had used the Court's decision in Burson to assert the Minnesota law was similarly valid. The Court instead ruled 7-2 that unlike Burson, which set narrow bounds on what the state could restrict around polling places (specifically, political campaigning speech), the Minnesota law was too vague on what was allowed or not, and reversed the decision of lower courts.
