= Eastman Kodak Co. v. Image Technical Services, Inc. =

Eastman Kodak Company v. Image Technical Services, Inc.
- Supreme Court of the United States

Argued December 10, 1991 Decided June 8, 1992
- Full case name: Eastman Kodak Company, Petitioner v. Image Technical Services, Inc., et al.
- Citations: 504 U.S. 451 (more) 112 S. Ct. 2072; 119 L. Ed. 2d 265; 1992 U.S. LEXIS 3405; 60 U.S.L.W. 4465; 1992-1 Trade Cas. (CCH) ¶ 69,839; 92 Cal. Daily Op. Service 4823; 92 Daily Journal DAR 7688; 6 Fla. L. Weekly Fed. S 331

Case history
- Prior: Image Technical Servs., Inc. v. Eastman Kodak Co., No. C-87-1686-WWS, 1988 U.S. Dist. LEXIS 17218 (N.D. Cal. Apr. 15, 1988); 903 F.2d 612 (9th Cir. 1990); cert. granted, 501 U.S. 1216 (1991).
- Subsequent: On remand, Image Technical Services, Inc. v. Eastman Kodak Co., 125 F.3d 1195 (9th Cir. 1997); cert. denied, 523 U.S. 1094 (1998).

Holding
- Even though an equipment manufacturer lacked significant market power in the primary market for its equipment, it could have sufficient market power (based on purchasers' being "locked in" to its product) in the secondary aftermarket (or submarket) for repair parts to be liable under the antitrust laws for its exclusionary conduct in the aftermarket.

Court membership
- Chief Justice William Rehnquist Associate Justices Byron White · Harry Blackmun; John P. Stevens · Sandra Day O'Connor; Antonin Scalia · Anthony Kennedy; David Souter · Clarence Thomas

Case opinions
- Majority: Blackmun, joined by Rehnquist, White, Stevens, Kennedy, Souter
- Dissent: Scalia, joined by O'Connor, Thomas

Laws applied
- Sherman Antitrust Act

Eastman Kodak Co. v. Image Technical Servs., Inc., 504 U.S. 451 (1992), is a 1992 Supreme Court decision in which the Court held that even though an equipment manufacturer lacked significant market power in the primary market for its equipment—copier-duplicators and other imaging equipment—nonetheless, it could have sufficient market power in the secondary aftermarket for repair parts to be liable under the antitrust laws for its exclusionary conduct in the aftermarket. The reason was that it was possible that, once customers were committed to the particular brand by having purchased a unit, they were "locked in" and no longer had any realistic alternative to turn to for repair parts.

== Background ==
Since 1975, Kodak had followed a policy of selling patented and unpatented repair parts only to direct purchasers of its equipment. The 18 plaintiffs in this case are Independent Service Organizations ("ISOs") engaged in repairing and servicing Kodak's copiers and other equipment, and in buying, reconditioning and selling used Kodak copiers and equipment. The effect of these practices is to bar sales of parts required to repair and maintain Kodak copiers and imaging equipment to the ISOs. In addition, Kodak refuses to sell maintenance service contracts on used equipment unless it is first inspected and brought up to standard by Kodak. Therefore, purchasers of used equipment from ISOs who want to purchase a maintenance agreement for the equipment from Kodak must first submit the equipment to Kodak for inspection and any necessary repair and upgrading.

In addition, Kodak has allegedly entered into agreements with original equipment manufacturers to prevent them from providing parts for Kodak equipment to the ISOs, with owners of Kodak equipment to prevent them from selling parts to the ISOs, with organizations that repair Kodak equipment to refuse to deal with the ISOs, and with entities providing financing for the purchase of Kodak equipment to cause them to require Kodak repair and service as a condition of financing.

The ISOs sued Kodak, alleging that it violated Sections 1 and 2 of the Sherman Act, 15 U.S.C. §§ 1, 2, and Section 3 of the Clayton Act, 15 U.S.C. § 14.

== District court summary judgment ruling ==
The district court granted Kodak's motion for summary judgment and dismissed the complaint. It said:

The fact that Kodak refused to sell parts to plaintiffs and other ISOs does not violate Section 1. The right of a manufacturer unilaterally to select its customers and to refuse to sell to others is well-established, regardless of the possible adverse effect on would-be customers.

The court turned to the section 2 monopolization claim. The ISOs contended that Kodak monopolized by leveraging monopoly power in one market to gain competitive advantage in another. The court rejected this argument as lacking any factual support. Kodak competes as an OEM with Xerox, IBM, Bell and Howell, 3M, and various Japanese manufacturers and has no significant market share as an OEM. The ISOs contended that Kodak "has a dominant share of a purported market for servicing Kodak copiers and micrographic equipment." But the conduct alleged does not "suggest that Kodak has attempted to leverage power in that market to gain competitive advantage in another market." To be sure, Kodak has "a natural monopoly over the market for parts it sells under its name but that imposes no duty on it to sell to plaintiffs." Therefore, "Kodak's unilateral refusal to sell its parts to plaintiffs does not violate Section 2."

The district court dismissed the complaint and the ISOs appealed to the Ninth Circuit.

== Ninth Circuit reversal of summary judgment ==
The Ninth Circuit reversed the summary judgment, 2–1. Preliminarily, the Ninth Circuit characterized at least one of the issues somewhat differently from the district court—as involving concerted rather than unilateral action. The Ninth Circuit said there were two main issues: "First, Kodak will not sell replacement parts for its equipment to Kodak equipment owners unless they agree not to use ISOs. Second, Kodak will not knowingly sell replacement parts to ISOs." The court added, "Kodak admits that the purpose of these policies is to prevent ISOs from competing with Kodak's own service organization for the repair of Kodak equipment."

The Ninth Circuit also emphasized some facts to which the district court had not referred. After 1982 ISOs began to compete significantly against Kodak in the repair of Kodak equipment. ISOs offered service for as little as half of Kodak's price. To better compete, Kodak in some cases cut its price for service. Some customers found ISO service superior to Kodak service. Kodak then developed its present policies of not selling replacement parts to ISOs or to customers who use ISOs.

As to the Section 1 issue, Kodak and the district court misconceived the statute. Kodak argued that it does not force owners to buy service in order to receive parts; Kodak only requires owners not to buy ISO service to receive parts. Kodak will sell parts to owners who agree to self-service their machines. The Ninth Circuit said that an unlawful tie-in violation occurs not only when a seller conditions a sale of one thing on the purchase of another thing too. It is also a violation to get the purchaser to agree not to purchase things from another seller.

That raised the question whether, if there was a tie-in, did Kodak have the market power necessary to make the tie unlawful. The ISOs argued that Kodak does have power in the parts market for two interdependent reasons. First, many Kodak parts are unique and available only from Kodak. Second, owners of Kodak machinery cannot readily switch to other companies' machinery (thereby obviating the need for Kodak parts). Once one owns Kodak's expensive machinery, he is locked in to it. Kodak countered that it had no power in the primary market, because its market share relative to IBM, Xerox, 3M, and the others was small. If equipment buyers find Kodak charging too much for parts and services, they will buy from IBM, Xerox, 3M, etc. instead of from Kodak. But once a purchaser has bought a Kodak copier, he cannot turn to IBM or Xerox for parts to fix his broken Kodak copier. But this is all theory, not fact, the court continued, and "market imperfections can keep economic theories about how consumers will act from mirroring reality." The court pointed to evidence that Kodak charged up to twice as much as the ISOs for service that is of lower quality than the ISOs's service. A price differential is evidence of market power. This indicates that there is a material issue of fact over market power, and therefore summary judgment on the issue was improvident.

Kodak argued that it acted unilaterally in refusing to deal with the ISOs. But the Ninth Circuit responded that Kodak entered into agreements with its equipment owners, which expressly set out in its "Terms of Sale," that Kodak will sell parts only to users "who service only their own Kodak equipment." That was sufficient to make the conduct concerted rather than unilateral.

Turning to the monopolization claim, the Ninth Circuit concluded that there were material issues of fact concerning whether Kodak fell within one of the exceptions to the principle that a firm generally has no duty to deal with competitors. On the factual record before the court, it was not possible to determine that summary judgment was proper. Therefore, the issue would have to be tried in the district court.

The dissent accepted Kodak's argument that Kodak was justified in imposing its restrictions to guard against inadequate service, because it had "submitted extensive and undisputed evidence of a marketing strategy based on high-quality service." The dissent also agreed with Kodak that that evidence of competition in the primary equipment market "necessarily precludes power in the derivative [parts] market." With respect to the § 2 monopolization claim, the dissent concluded that, entirely apart from market power considerations, Kodak was entitled to summary judgment on the basis of its first business justification because it had "submitted extensive and undisputed evidence of a marketing strategy based on high-quality service."

== Opinion of the Court ==
Justice Blackmun delivered the opinion of the Court, in which Chief Justice Rehnquist and Justices White, Stevens, Kennedy and Souter joined. Justice Scalia filed a dissenting opinion, in which Justices O'Connor and Thomas joined.

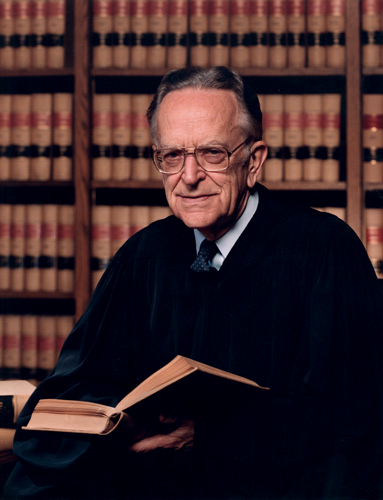
Justice Harry Blackmun delivered the opinion of the Court

=== Majority opinion ===
The Supreme Court affirmed the Ninth Circuit's denial of Kodak's summary judgment motion reversing the district court. Justice Blackmun began by emphasizing some additional facts from the record that neither court below had relied on. Kodak did not make all of the parts that went into its equipment. It purchased parts from parts manufacturers. As part of Kodak's policy to limit sales of replacement parts for micrographic and copying machines only to buyers of Kodak equipment who use Kodak service or repair their own machines, Kodak sought to limit ISOs' access to other sources of Kodak parts besides Kodak itself, Kodak got manufacturers of its parts to agree with it that they would not sell parts that fit Kodak equipment to anyone other than Kodak. Kodak also pressured Kodak equipment owners and independent parts distributors not to sell Kodak parts to ISOs. In addition, Kodak took steps to restrict the availability to ISOs of used machines.

Kodak intended to and was successful, through these policies, in making it more difficult for ISOs to sell service for Kodak machines. ISOs were unable to obtain parts from reliable sources, and many were forced out of business, while others lost substantial revenue. Customers were forced to switch to Kodak service even though they preferred ISO service.

Kodak argued that it could not have the power to raise prices of service and parts above the level that would be charged in a competitive market, because any increase in profits from a higher price in the aftermarkets at least would necessarily be offset by a corresponding loss in profits from lower equipment sales as consumers began purchasing equipment with more attractive service costs from other sellers. It urged the Court to adopt an irrebuttable presumption or substantive legal rule that "equipment competition precludes any finding of monopoly power in derivative aftermarkets."

The Court refused to do that. It insisted that this was a fact issue, not something to be decided by theory. Kodak was equally insistent that the existence of market power in the service and parts markets, absent power in the equipment market, "simply makes no economic sense," and the absence of a legal presumption would deter procompetitive behavior.

The Court refused to accept Kodak's economic theories and responded that they were flawed:

Kodak's proposed rule rests on a factual assumption about the cross-elasticity of demand in the equipment and aftermarkets: "If Kodak raised its parts or service prices above competitive levels, potential customers would simply stop buying Kodak equipment. Perhaps Kodak would be able to increase short term profits through such a strategy, but at a devastating cost to its long term interests."Kodak argues that the Court should accept, as a matter of law, this "basic economic realit[y]" that competition in the equipment market necessarily prevents market power in the aftermarkets.

Even if Kodak could not raise the price of service and parts one cent without losing equipment sales, that fact would not disprove market power in the aftermarkets. The sales of even a monopolist are reduced when it sells goods at a monopoly price, but the higher price more than compensates for the loss in sales. Kodak's claim that charging more for service and parts would be "a short-run game" is based on the false dichotomy that there are only two prices that can be charged—a competitive price or a ruinous one.

But there could easily be a middle, optimum price at which the increased revenues from the higher priced sales of service and parts would more than compensate for the lower revenues from lost equipment sales. The fact that the equipment market imposes a restraint on prices in the aftermarkets by no means disproves the existence of power in those markets. Thus, contrary to Kodak's assertion, there is no immutable physical law—no "basic economic reality"—insisting that competition in the equipment market cannot coexist with market power in the aftermarkets.

The real underlying problem with Kodak's theories, echoed by the United States (Antitrust Division) as amicus curiae, is that it unrealistically postulates an all-knowing equipment purchaser:

[Copier equipment] consumers must inform themselves of the total cost of the "package"—equipment, service, and parts—at the time of purchase; that is, consumers must engage in accurate life-cycle pricing. Life-cycle pricing of complex, durable equipment is difficult and costly. In order to arrive at an accurate price, a consumer must acquire a substantial amount of raw data and undertake sophisticated analysis. The necessary information would include data on price, quality, and availability of products needed to operate, upgrade, or enhance the initial equipment, as well as service and repair costs, including estimates of breakdown frequency, nature of repairs, price of service and parts, length of "downtime," and losses incurred from downtime.

Much of this information is difficult—some of it impossible—to acquire at the time of purchase. During the life of a product, companies may change the service and parts prices, and develop products with more advanced features, a decreased need for repair, or new warranties. In addition, the information is likely to be customer specific; lifecycle costs will vary from customer to customer with the type of equipment, degrees of equipment use, and costs of downtime.

Furthermore, the Court explained, there is the issue of lock–in:

If the cost of switching is high, consumers who already have purchased the equipment, and are thus "locked in," will tolerate some level of service-price increases before changing equipment brands. Under this scenario, a seller profitably could maintain supracompetitive prices in the aftermarket if the switching costs were high relative to the increase in service prices, and the number of locked-in customers were high relative to the number of new purchasers.

The Court explained that it was unpersuaded by Kodak's theories:

In sum, there is a question of fact whether information costs and switching costs foil the simple assumption that the equipment and service markets act as pure complements to one another. We conclude, then, that Kodak has failed to demonstrate that respondents' inference of market power in the service and parts markets is unreasonable, and that, consequently, Kodak is entitled to summary judgment. It is clearly reasonable to infer that Kodak has market power to raise prices and drive out competition in the aftermarkets, since respondents offer direct evidence that Kodak did so.

The Court then turned to the final issue: whether there were genuine issues for trial as to whether Kodak has monopolized, or attempted to monopolize, the Kodak equipment service and parts markets, in violation of § 2 of the Sherman Act. The Court said that the evidence that Kodak controls nearly 100% of the parts market and 80% to 95% of the service market, with no readily available substitutes, was sufficient to survive summary judgment under the stringent monopoly standard of § 2. Kodak contended, however, that as a matter of law a single brand of a product or service can never be a relevant market under the Sherman Act. The Court disagreed: "Because service and parts for Kodak equipment are not interchangeable with other manufacturers' service and parts, the relevant market from the Kodak equipment owner's perspective is composed of only those companies that service Kodak machines." This is, the Court continued, a fact issue. Summary judgment is therefore inappropriate.

=== Dissent ===
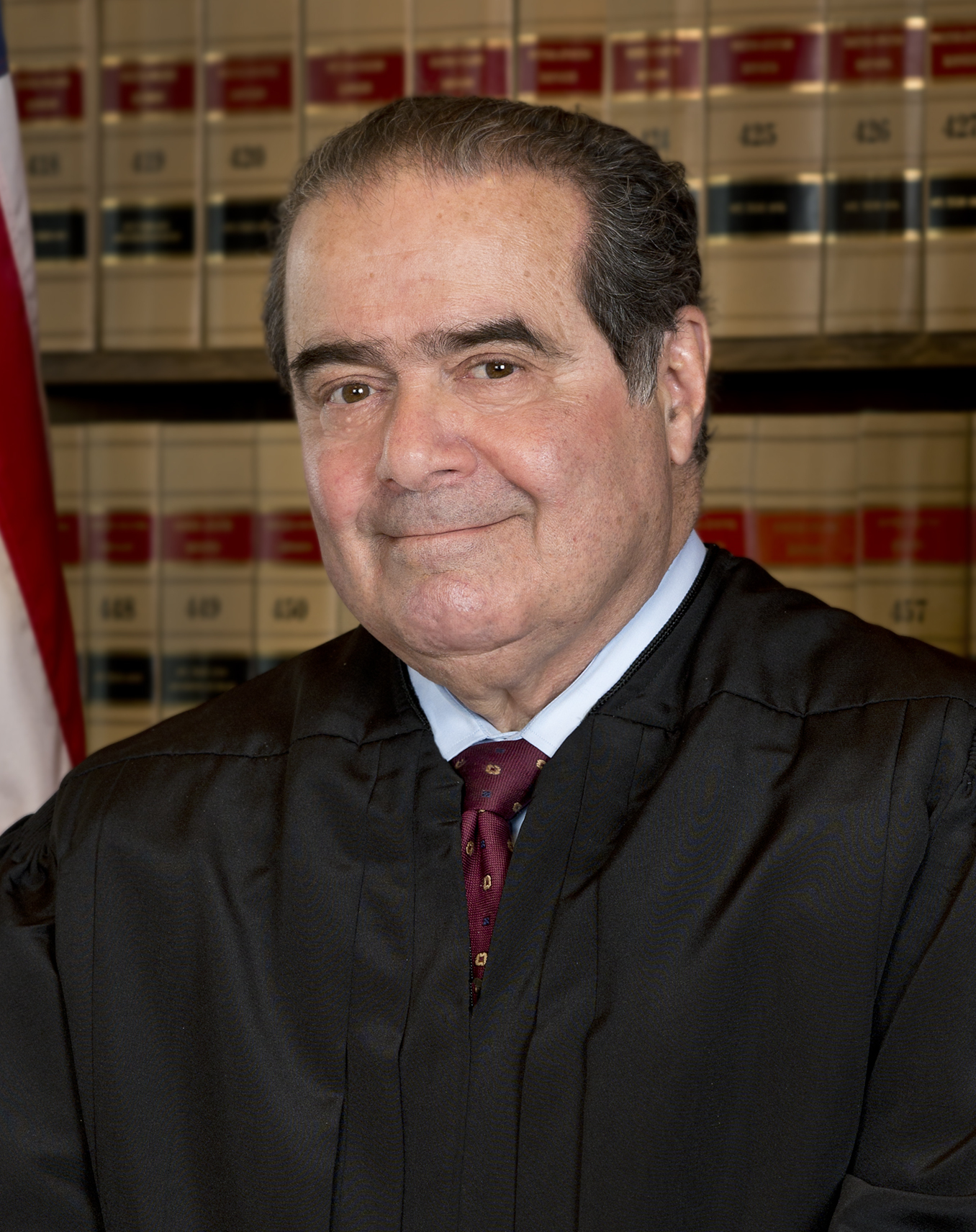
Justice Scalia filed a dissenting opinion

Justice Scalia dissented and denied that this was just another case on the proper standard for summary judgment, as the majority had said. Justice Scalia insisted that "the case presents a very narrow—but extremely important—question of substantive antitrust law: whether, . . . for purposes of applying our exacting rules governing the behavior of would-be monopolists, a manufacturer's conceded lack of power in the interbrand market for its equipment is somehow consistent with its possession of market, or even monopoly, power in wholly derivative aftermarkets for that equipment."

He complained: "The Court today finds in the typical manufacturer's inherent power over its own brand of equipment—over the sale of distinctive repair parts for that equipment, for example— the sort of 'monopoly power' sufficient to bring the sledgehammer of § 2 into play." He argued that the rationality of equipment buyers would lead them to "simply turn to Kodak's competitors for photocopying and micrographic systems," if Kodak engaged in price gouging on parts. A "rational consumer considering the purchase of Kodak equipment will inevitably factor into his purchasing decision the expected cost of aftermarket support." Therefore, Kodak could not logically have market power in a supposed relevant market for unique Kodak parts. To be sure, there are some irrational consumers, such as the U.S. Government, "[b]ut we have never before premised the application of antitrust doctrine on the lowest common denominator of consumer.

Scalia dismissed lock–in as a material factor for "it is of no concern to the antitrust laws." He explained, "Though that power can plainly work to the injury of certain consumers, it produces only a brief perturbation in competitive conditions—not the sort of thing the antitrust laws do or should worry about." The Court should not condemn out of hand "such potentially procompetitive arrangements simply because of the antitrust defendant's inherent power over the unique parts for its own brand."

As for monopolization under § 2, it should be reserved as "a specialized mechanism for responding to extraordinary agglomerations (or threatened agglomerations) of economic power," not mere power over one's one brand of product where there exists a vibrant interbrand market.

== Remand decision ==
In August 1997 the Ninth Circuit considered the case another time on remand. The court affirmed a jury verdict that awarded the ISOs $72 million in treble damages on section 2 of the Sherman Act. It also allowed a 10-year injunction that requiring Kodak to sell the parts for its machines at reasonable, non-monopoly and nondiscriminatory prices.

The ISOs contended that Kodak had used its monopoly in the parts market to monopolize, or attempt to monopolize, the service market. Kodak now asserted that its intellectual property rights provided a defense against the claim. The court held that rights under patents and copyrights are a rebuttably presumed legitimate business justification for refusing to deal with competitors. However, the ISOs rebutted the presumption.

Kodak easily met the market share requirements of a § 2 case because "Kodak controls nearly 100% of the parts market and 80% to 90% of the service market, with no readily available substitutes." In addition, significant barriers to entry existed in the parts and service markets, and "Kodak has 220 patents and controls its designs and tools, brand name power and manufacturing ability[,] . . . controls original equipment manufacturers through contracts," and operates on an economy of scale. In addition to possessing its market share, Kodak engaged in exclusionary conduct.

That left the main issue whether the patent ownership justified what would otherwise be monopolization. Kodak argued that the district court had erroneously instructed the jury that "the fact that some of the replacement parts are patented or copyrighted does not provide Kodak with a defense against any of those antitrust claims" if Kodak misused its parts monopoly to monopolize or attempt to monopolize. The Ninth Circuit said the case presented a question of first impression. "At the border of intellectual property monopolies and antitrust markets lies a field of dissonance yet to be harmonized by statute or the Supreme Court." Some weight, but not decisive weight, must be given to the intellectual property rights of a monopolist. The court concluded it should use this test to resolve the question of whether one in Kodak's position should be held liable: "while exclusionary conduct can include a monopolist's unilateral refusal to license a [patent or] copyright," or to sell its patented or copyrighted work, a monopolist's "desire to exclude others from its [protected] work is a presumptively valid business justification for any immediate harm to consumers." The court said that using such a "presumption should act to focus the factfinder on the primary interest of both intellectual property and antitrust laws: public interest."

This presumption could be rebutted if the justifications for invoking intellectual property rights were merely pretextual and just an excuse for exclusionary conduct. After reviewing the evidence, the court said that "it is more probable than not that the jury would have found Kodak's presumptively valid business justification rebutted on grounds of pretext."

The injunction requiring part sales originally applied to all parts. The Ninth Circuit limited the injunction to parts made by Kodak, since the ISOs could now buy such parts from their independent manufacturers. Kodak argued that on parts for which it had a copyright or patent monopoly, it should be allowed to charge monopoly prices rather than merely "reasonable" prices. The Ninth Circuit said when compulsory sales relief was ordered in patent-antitrust cases, the courts ordered the sales to be a "reasonable" prices. In this case, however, it would be sufficient that the prices be nondiscriminatory and therefore the Ninth Circuit modified the district court's injunction order to eliminate the reasonableness requirement.

== Commentary ==
=== On main opinion ===
==== Herbert Hovenkamp ====
Herbert Hovenkamp has been highly critical of the decision. In his 2006 book The Antitrust Enterprise, he strongly disagreed that a single-brand aftermarket could ever constitute a separate relevant market. In his 2015 book Federal Antitrust Policy, The Law of Competition and Its Practice, he said:

Twenty years of litigation under Kodak had expended millions of dollars in legal fees and not produced a single defensible decision finding market power on the basis of lock–in. Academic commentary has been overwhelmingly negative as well. Kodak seems to be one of those ill conceived expansionist antitrust doctrines that the Supreme Court would do well to overrule.

==== Mark Patterson ====
Mark Patterson argues in the North Carolina Law Review that the Kodak decision is rational and economically sound, incorporating into antitrust law previously neglected but important economic learning about the cost and value of product information and its relevance to creating market power. He points to other cases in the past where market power was created by making information expensive to obtain. For example, in National Society of Professional Engineers v. United States, the Supreme Court held illegal an engineering society's rule that forbade members from providing price information to buyers until the buyers had tentatively agreed to purchase the members' services. Patterson gives as another example FTC v. Indiana Federation of Dentists, in which the Supreme Court held it illegal for a dentists' organization to establish a policy requiring its members to withhold x-rays from dental insurers in connection with evaluating claims for benefits. In both cases the Court found that the organizations were tampering with price mechanisms by using the unavailability of information to prevent "the functioning of markets." Patterson sees Kodak as an extension of these decisions and "thus a step toward providing a more economically supportable and judicially consistent antitrust treatment of information."

==== Eleanor Fox ====
Eleanor Fox perceives Kodak as "essentially a case about abusing competitors; it is not essentially a case about lack of consumer information," as many other analysts perceive it. "Abuse and bullying by one firm with power over another is the oldest antitrust violation extant and has not lost its place in the antitrust firmament." She continues:

The information-failure analysts see Kodak and U.S. antitrust law from the wrong end of the telescope. Peeling away the economics-of-information technicalities of Kodak, one might conclude: Kodak teaches that price theory economics has not read competitors or dynamics out of the law.

==== Antitrust article ====
In an article in Antitrust, two of the lawyers representing the ISOs in the Kodak case describe the decision as turning back a growing trend of "Chicago School" revanchism against protection of consumers against wealth transfers to monopolists:

The Kodak case would have been much more significant had the dissenters prevailed. Their explicit goal was judicial economy through the rejection, as a matter of law, of the position that consumer welfare can be harmed if manufacturers of complex durable equipment are allowed to recover monopoly profits in aftermarkets (like service or software) of their products.

If Kodak had prevailed in making its economic theories the law, these authors maintain, the consequence would have been to exempt "a vast and growing sector of the economy from the antitrust laws."

==== Borenstein et al. paper ====
A paper by three economists—Borenstein, MacKie-Mason, and Netz—agrees with the Kodak Court that "market imperfections can keep economic theories about how consumers will react from mirroring reality." But they argue that the Court did not go far enough in rejecting the defense economic arguments. They insist that "strong primary market competition will [not] discipline aftermarket behavior, even without market imperfections," and that:

In fact, firms will rationally engage in above-cost aftermarket pricing even if the equipment market is very competitive, all parties are well informed, and demand in the market is stable. Supracompetitive prices for proprietary aftermarket goods and services will occur so long as there is an inability to contract for these goods and services at the time of purchase.

The authors describe a continuous "balancing between high aftermarket prices that reap profits from customers who have already purchased the equipment and low aftermarket prices that tend to increase future equipment sales." In this process, future profits from enhanced futures sales as a result of creating a reputation for not gouging customers on aftermarket sales must be discounted to the present value of the future equipment sales, but present profits from current aftermarket sales do not need to be discounted. In a declining market for original equipment, which many antitrust cases have involved, there is a great incentive to charge high aftermarket prices at the expense of incumbent equipment owners. Even if equipment demand is expected to remain constant, the writers argue, profits in the future are of less value due to discounting. Accordingly:

Only if expected profits from equipment are growing at a faster rate than the discount rate will a firm have the incentive to price the aftermarket product at (or below) the competitive level. While such rapid growth does occur at times, it is generally short-lived and is then followed by a period of slowly growing or declining equipment sales. If slower growth or declines in sales are forecast in the near future, then the incentive to raise aftermarket prices is likely to be present even if current growth is quite rapid.

The authors then address other information costs. They explain that, even if there were no switching costs to adopting a new brand, high aftermarket prices would still be rational. The reason is that a manufacturer's aftermarket pricing policies can raise the cost of switching by lowering the market value of a customer's used equipment. When a customer switches it pays the net cost of the new brand of equipment minus the used value of its old brand of equipment. A manufacturer's increase in service or parts prices will correspondingly lower the market value of used equipment. Thus, "a $2000 increase in the present value of lifetime service costs will reduce used equipment prices by $2000 and thus will raise the cost of switching to another brand by $2000." The result is that the customer "is unable to avoid the costs of supracompetitive aftermarket pricing, and the possibility of switching to another equipment brand does not solve the problem, as defendants argue." Accordingly: "Even under the most favorable assumptions-perfect competition in the equipment market and perfect information on the part of consumers-firms have the ability and incentive to price aftermarket products above cost."

==== Jill Protos ====
A Comment by Jill Protos in the Case Western Reserve Law Review perceives the decision of the Supreme Court as a setback for the Chicago Law School's form of antitrust analysis. The Comment explained Kodak's "Chicago School" that persuaded the district court but which the court of appeals and Supreme Court rejected:

Kodak alleged that if it raised the price of its parts and service above competitive levels, consumers would simply purchase an alternative photocopier equipment brand with more attractive parts and service costs. Kodak further argued that it lacked the market power to engage in monopoly practices in the parts and services markets because such an action would jeopardize sales volume in the primary photocopier equipment market. In other words, any gains realized by anti-competitive practices in the parts and service market would be offset by losses in the photocopier equipment market. Based on this economic reasoning, Kodak urged the adoption of a substantive legal rule that competition in primary markets precludes the finding of market power in derivative aftermarkets.

As a result of the existence of market imperfections such as imperfect information and information costs, the Supreme Court believed that "many consumers would be incapable of making total package price computations, or alternatively would simply choose not to make such calculations." and therefore not act in accordance with the Chicago School's model. In addition, the model does not consider switching costs and resulting lock-in. Therefore:

[T]he majority found that the possibility of market imperfections created a material issue of fact as to. whether Kodak's theory was an accurate description of reality Thus, according to the majority the use of economic theory to grant summary judgment was inappropriate in this case. Instead, Kodak is required to withstand trial, and prove that its economic theory is indeed representative of reality in order to successfully defend its replacement parts policy.

The Comment sees Kodak as "clearly a setback for Chicago School adherents who seek to fully integrate their economic theory into antitrust law," and instead a coming era in which "parties will be forced to factually demonstrate the effect on competition caused by the challenged conduct" and where "reliance on economic theory alone will not suffice." The writer contrasts Kodak with Matsushita Electric Industrial Co., Ltd. v. Zenith Radio Corp., in which the Court had said that "if the [antitrust plaintiffs'] claim is one that simply makes no economic sense - [the plaintiffs] must come forward with more persuasive evidence to support their claim than would otherwise be necessary" in order to survive a motion for summary judgment.

The writer deplores the Court's unwillingness to allow defendants to rest on an assertion of economic theory:

Antitrust law, prior to Kodak was developing into a body of law based on economic theory. Matsushita suggested that the Court had reached the point of complete acceptance of "Chicago School" theory by indicating that parties could defend against antitrust allegations merely by asserting that the allegation is contrary to economic theory In Kodak, however, the Court retreats from its embracement of economic theory Now, defendants must introduce evidence to prove that its economic theory does in fact reflect commercial realities. Alternatively, plaintiffs can now challenge certain conduct merely by attacking the assumptions on which the defendant's economic theory is based.

The writer sees this as ominous and concludes that the decision may signal an unfortunate reversion to 19th century populism:

Kodak signals that fewer cases will be dismissed on summary judgment, since parties will have to factually prove their economic theories. . . . Kodak may, however, signal more than just an increased antitrust docket for the District Courts. The Court's refusal to decide antitrust claims based solely on economic theory may implicate more than just a setback for "Chicago School" adherents, who would readily decide such claims by reference to economic theory alone. Threads of populism may underly the Court's refusal to accept Kodak's economic theory on its face. If Kodak signals that populism is creeping into antitrust law, the decision may have adverse implications for competition. Antitrust policy based on populism, as opposed to economic theory, may result in the protection of individual competitors, but not overall competition. As a result, antitrust law may once again be subject to Justice Holmes's criticism of being "humbug based on economic ignorance and incompetence."

==== Lawrence Fesca ====
In a Comment in the Notre Dame Law Review, Lawrence Fesca also sees the Kodak decision as a setback for the Chicago School, but finds it less distressing, and also he considers seeing the decision as an announcement of Chicago demise to be an exaggeration. He points first to the Court['s insistence on the supremacy of facts over theories:

Kodak did little to help the cause of Chicago proponents . . . with respect to economic analysis in general. In language that may signal a watershed in antitrust jurisprudence, the Court questioned implicitly the norms accepted by the Chicago School. "Legal presumptions that rest on formalistic distinctions rather than actual market realities are generally disfavored in antitrust law. This Court has preferred to resolve antitrust claims on a case-by-case basis, focusing on the "particular facts disclosed by record [evidence]."

Fesca says that from this language some "commentators have deduced that we are witnessing the end of the Chicago School era" and been led "to claim that we will be returning to the economic populism that prevailed before the rise of the Chicago School." But he concludes that "reports of the Chicago School's demise are greatly exaggerated." He points out that the Supreme Court's grounds for reversing the summary judgment merely used one set of "theoretical arguments (information defects exacerbated by price discrimination and switching costs) to defeat another theoretical argument describing the [supposed] effect competition in the foremarket has on aftermarkets." He sees the populist barbarians at the gate as having a long way to go before demolishing the Chicago Empire.

=== On the remand opinion ===
● A Note in the Berkeley Technology Law Journal agreed with the Ninth Circuit's legal standard on remand that it would "allow the presumption that IP rights constitute a legitimate business justification for exclusionary conduct and allow the antitrust plaintiff to rebut it." The writer concluded that the polar options (1) "of not allowing IP rights to play any role in an antitrust defense" would "undermine the public interest in the patent and copyright statutes"; and (2) patents should "always be allowed to trump antitrust law"—would equally be mistakes. But the Note faults the Ninth Circuit's analysis because it "does not harmonize this 'field of dissonance' directly."That is, the court did not decide whether the scope of the patent rights should have extended to the use of parts to provide service and maintenance. Reliance on pretext to condemn the restraints is too case–specific. It fails to "offer much insight or guidance as to how this court will, or any other court should, review firms' actions" in future cases. Gully, supra at 350–51.

To answer the question of proper scope of patent rights, the Note says, the court should have explored further issues:

If there were no way for Kodak to recoup its investment in developing parts and machines other than to effectuate its patent and copyright monopoly in the service market, there would be strong reasons for allowing it to do so. It might be the case that the short-term harm to consumers of allowing Kodak to monopolize the parts and the service markets is less than the long-term harm of not providing firms like Kodak with adequate incentive to enter a competitive market and develop new products. It is not entirely clear, however, that the patent and copyright systems should be used to subsidize Kodak's inability to compete in the service market against the ISOs, who might provide better service to consumers for less money.

● A Comment in the Temple Law Review by Sharon McCullen addresses a conflict between the Federal Circuit's decision in In re Independent Service Organization Antitrust Litigation, which "correctly held that a patent holder who unilaterally refuses to license or sell a patented item in any product market does not violate antitrust laws without evidence of illegal tying, fraud in the patent procurement process or sham litigation," and the Ninth Circuit's remand decision in the Kodak case, which instead "adopted a rebuttable presumption that a patent holder's refusal to license or sell a patented work constitutes a presumptively valid business justification to exclude others," but also held that the presumption is vulnerable to evidence that "the patent holder's refusal was not based on a motivation to protect the patented item but rather was a pretext to hide anti-competitive activity." The writer criticizes the Ninth Circuit's rejection of Kodak's proffered legitimate business justification "by evaluating Kodak's subjective motivation in refusing to license or sell the patented invention and labeling Kodak's justification as a 'pretext.' "

Relying on the Supreme Court's 1908 decision in Continental Paper Bag Co. v. Eastern Paper Bag Co., in which the Court stated that arbitrary "exclusion may be said to have been of the very essence of the right conferred by the patent, as it is the privilege of any owner of property to use or not use it, without question of motive," McCullen argues that the Federal Circuit correctly concluded that subjective motivation for the refusal to license is irrelevant and should not be inquired into. "To hold otherwise," she insists, "would diminish the patent holder's statutory right to exclude others, defeating the primary objective of the patent law: to encourage innovation and to bring forth new knowledge for the benefit of society."

● Seungwoo Son, in an article in the University of Illinois Journal of Law, Technology & Policy, expands on the comparison between the Kodak remand and the Federal Circuit's Intergraph decisions to include the FTC's proceeding against Intel over use of monopoly power in the microprocessor market to force customers to grant Intel royalty-free licenses to their own microprocessor technology and the Federal Circuit's decision in the Independent Service Organizations (or Xerox) case.

The author builds his analysis on the exhaustion doctrine and the repair and reconstruction doctrine, which hold respectively that the owner of patented property such as a machine has a right to use and dispose of it without being subject to post-sale restrictions by the patentee and a right to repair it to keep it in good order. The general theory is that once a manufacturer such as Kodak sells a copier to a customer, the customer acquires a property interest in the copier that includes a right to use it without restrictions and keep it in good repair, but refusals to sell repair parts to ISOs (at least absent a sound business justification) unreasonably derogates from the customer's property rights.

The author considers high-tech industries that evolve and change rapidly and are complicated. That may call for different rules than used in the past. The author states, "This paper proposes a plausible alternative approach for the Kodak-Xerox contexts, based upon an idea for redefining the scope of a patent holder's rights by means of expanding the definitions of the [exhaustion] doctrine and doctrine of repair to conform with patent policy goals." The author excludes from his discussion "pure" refusals to deal, by which he means those refusals to deal without an ulterior purpose, such as one to divide markets illegally or restrict competition in markets outside the scope of the patent. His focus is on selective refusals to deal used to require adherence to a restrictive practice. He asserts that the exhaustion doctrine should be expanded so that an equipment seller such as Kodak or Xerox "should neither indirectly limit the existing choices of a buyer nor constrain a buyer's right to use, repair, and resell the product, without reasonable business interests or justifications." He further asserts:

When a consumer purchases the product, maintaining the purchased product through repair service should be one of the consumer's freedoms, whether or not the components of the product are patented. Once it is sold, some parts of the product will eventually need to be repaired or replaced in most cases. Thus, the product composed of patented parts must be treated as primary. After a seller sells a product and the patented repair parts, a patentee should not be able to restrict the buyers' right to repair some components of the purchased product through repair service, or to refuse to sell to any other buyer on similar terms, without a business justification.

The author argues that to maximize consumer welfare;

The definition of the first-sale doctrine must be broadened to limit a patent holder's rights, when those rights which restrict a consumer's choices or freedom of trade and result in a consumer becoming locked into a patent by the patent holder's indirect and socially undesirable business strategy. This approach based on consumer perspectives strikes a better balance between a patentee's legitimate profits and a consumer's benefits than the approach based on the patent holder's perspective.

Applying these standards to the Kodak remand case and the Xerox cases, which had similar facts (both equipment manufacturers refused to sell parts to ISOs or to equipment purchasers who used ISOs to repair their equipment) but opposite results, leads to an approval of Kodak and disapproval of Xerox. The main difference between the Ninth Circuit in Kodak and the Federal Circuit in Xerox was that the Ninth Circuit considered that pretext undermined the proffered business justification while the Federal Circuit considered motivation and pretext irrelevant:

The Federal Circuit focused on incentives for the creation of IP by allowing the IP holder to reap profits wherever they were available. However, it only emphasized one side of IP policy—namely, that giving more benefits to a patentee creates more innovations. The other aspect is the limitation of patent rights to prevent overreaching. In this respect, the proposed standard strikes a better balance between the legitimate interests of patent holders and their customers.

The author then turned to the two cases involving Intel. As in Xerox, the Federal Circuit in Intergraph found IP rights dominant, and it simply rejected the Ninth Circuit's view in the Kodak remand case. The FTC acted against Intel, however, because it saw unlawful monopolization in Intel's refusal to deal (provide technical information on purchased microprocessor chips or sell chips) unless customers were willing to make their patents available to Intel. The FTC alleged "that 'Intel has entrenched and threatens to continue entrenching its monopoly power in the relevant lines of commerce' by coercing other customers into licensing their innovations to Intel." This would assure Intel "access to any new technology and prevent threats to its alleged microprocessor monopoly from ever developing."

The author concludes from his analysis that selective refusals to deal in intellectual property rights should be held violative of § 2 of the Sherman Act if:

1. the intellectual property confers market power;
2. the conduct "excludes or substantially impairs the competitive capacity of a competitor or brings about anti-competitive effects in a related market"; and
3. "constrains customer choices directly or indirectly"—

unless the patentee proffers a valid reason to justify its refusal.

● In a Note in the Washington Law Review critical of the Image Technical remand decision, the author comments that, perhaps, "the Ninth Circuit has certainly come a long way from Westinghouse and its rejection of the notion that "an antitrust violation may be found where a patent holder does precisely that which the patent laws authorize."
