= List of United States Supreme Court cases, volume 504 =

This is a list of all the United States Supreme Court cases from volume 504 of the United States Reports:

Case name	Citation	Date decided
Keeney v. Tamayo-Reyes	504 U.S. 1	1992
Denton v. Hernandez	504 U.S. 25	1992
United States v. Williams	504 U.S. 36	1992
Foucha v. Louisiana	504 U.S. 71	1992
Riggins v. Nevada	504 U.S. 127	1992
Wyatt v. Cole	504 U.S. 158	1992
Wade v. United States	504 U.S. 181	1992
Burson v. Freeman	504 U.S. 191	1992
United States v. Burke	504 U.S. 229	1992
Evans v. United States	504 U.S. 255	1992
Quill Corp. v. North Dakota	504 U.S. 298	1992
Chemical Waste Management, Inc. v. Hunt	504 U.S. 334	1992
Fort Gratiot Sanitary Landfill, Inc. v. Michigan Dept. of Natural Resources	504 U.S. 353	1992
Morales v. T.W.A.	504 U.S. 374	1992
Burdick v. Takushi	504 U.S. 428	1992
Eastman Kodak Co. v. Image Technical Services, Inc.	504 U.S. 451	1992
United States v. Thompson/Center Arms Co.	504 U.S. 505	1992
Sochor v. Florida	504 U.S. 527	1992
Lujan v. Defenders of Wildlife	504 U.S. 555	1992
Republic of Argentina v. Weltover, Inc.	504 U.S. 607	1992
F.T.C. v. Ticor Title Ins. Co.	504 U.S. 621	1992
Burlington N.R.R. Co. v. Ford	504 U.S. 648	1992
United States v. Alvarez-Machain	504 U.S. 655	1992
Ankenbrandt v. Richards	504 U.S. 689	1992
Morgan v. Illinois	504 U.S. 719	1992
Patterson v. Shumate	504 U.S. 753	1992
Allied-Signal, Inc. v. Director	504 U.S. 768	1992
