= Crooke baronets =

The Crooke Baronetcy of Baltimore, County Cork was a title in the Baronetage of Ireland. It was created for Sir Thomas Crooke, 1st Baronet in 1624. The Crooke family came originally from Cransley in Northamptonshire; Thomas Crooke, the father of the first baronet, was a well-known preacher of strongly Calvinist views.

Sir Thomas Crooke was granted substantial lands in County Cork in 1607. He founded the town of Baltimore, which was largely destroyed in the Sack of Baltimore in 1631, and he also gave his name to the village of Crookhaven. He sat in the Irish House of Commons as MP for Baltimore in the Irish Parliament of 1613-15. Although he claimed to have been moved principally by religious fervour in founding Baltimore, he was often accused of having founded the town to profit by the spoils of piracy. Baltimore was described as a nest of pirates, which drew most of its wealth from the pirate trade. A Privy Council investigation in 1608 cleared him of any wrongdoing, but his innocence or guilt is still a matter of debate.

The title became dormant in 1666, when the son of the 2nd Baronet, Thomas, obtained a patent on 12 July 1666 for certain lands, and on marrying the sister of the forfeiting proprietor of these lands (Ellen MacDermot MacCarthy, the daughter of Tiege MacDermot MacCarthy), he dropped the title. The Crookes of Crookstown House (near Crookstown, County Cork) were descended from Sir Thomas.

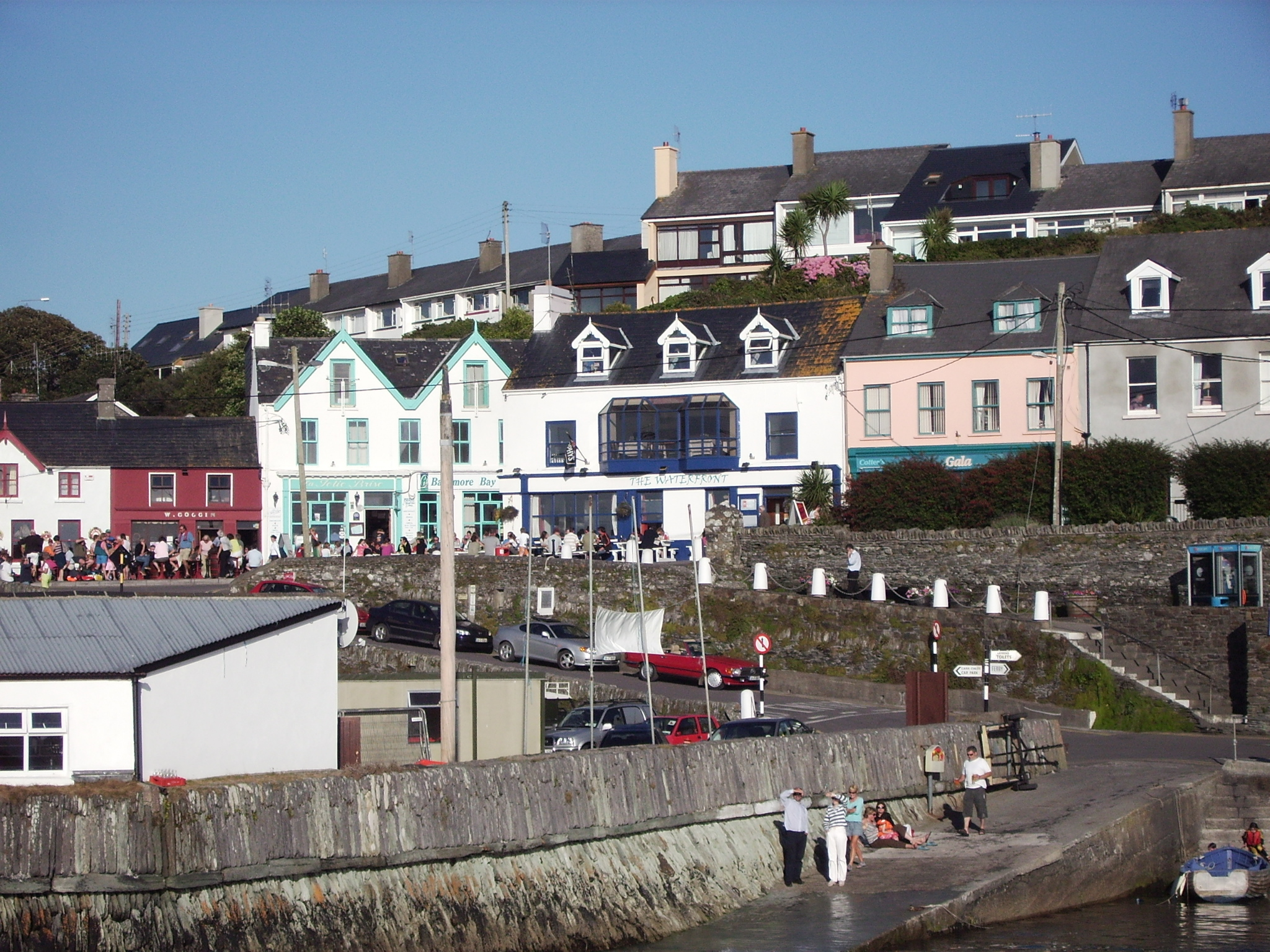
Baltimore, which was founded by Sir Thomas Crooke, 1st Baronet

== Crooke Baronets of Baltimore 1624-1666 ==
- Sir Thomas Crooke, 1st Baronet (1574-1630)
- Sir Samuel Crooke, 2nd Baronet (d.1635)
- Sir Thomas Crooke, 3rd Baronet, who stopped using the title in 1666.
- Thomas Crooke, presumed 4th Baronet (d. 1733)
- William Crooke, presumed 5th Baronet (d. 1755)
- Thomas Crooke, presumed 6th Baronet
- William Crooke, presumed 7th Baronet (d. 1799)
- William Crooke, presumed 8th Baronet
- Thomas Crooke, presumed 9th Baronet (1817-1876)
- Richard Crooke, presumed 10th Baronet (1870-1844)
- John Crooke, presumed 11th Baronet (1920-?)
- Roland Crooke, presumed 12th Baronet (1951-)
