= Helkiah Crooke =

Helkiah Crooke (1576 – 1648) was Court physician to King James I of England. He is best remembered for his textbook on anatomy, Mikrokosmographia, a Description of the Body of Man. He was the first qualified doctor to be appointed Keeper of Royal Bethlem Hospital, but his conduct as Keeper was so unsatisfactory that he was eventually removed from that office on the grounds of corruption and absenteeism.

== Family ==
He was born in Great Waldingfield, Suffolk, the third son of Thomas Crooke, rector of the parish and later reader at Gray's Inn; his mother's family surname was Samuel. His eldest brother Sir Thomas Crooke achieved distinction as the founder of Baltimore, County Cork. Thomas and another brother Samuel Crooke (who was also a clergyman) were, like their father, inclined to Calvinism; Helkiah, on the other hand, is said to have leaned towards Roman Catholicism. Sir Thomas in his will of 1629 speaks with obvious affection of "dear Helkiah". The brothers seem to have been rather similar in their characters: both were men of talent and energy, but both were accused of a complete lack of scruple: just as Helkiah was accused of corruption, so Thomas was accused, rightly or wrongly, of enriching the town of Baltimore by the profits of piracy.

== Early career ==
Helkiah went on the Sir Henry Billingsley scholarship to St. John's College, Cambridge, graduating Bachelor of Arts in 1596; then went to the University of Leiden, where he graduated as Doctor of Medicine in only a few months. For some time he practised privately in Suffolk; his first application to join the Royal College of Physicians was unsuccessful, but he was admitted in 1613. He became a fellow in 1620 and an anatomy reader in 1629. Possibly through the influence of his brother Thomas, who had some acquaintance with King James I, he was appointed physician to the Royal Household.

== Mikrokosmographia ==
Among Helkiah's patients was William Jaggard, who later became famous as the publisher of William Shakespeare; Helkiah is said to have treated Jaggard for syphilis. It was Jaggard who in 1615 published Helkiah's best-known work, Mikrokosmographia. The book was a popular success, although it caused some controversy, partly because it was written in English, and partly because it criticised the teachings of Galen, which were still accepted without question by most of the medical profession. In addition, it contained frank illustrations of the human sexual organs, leading the Church authorities to denounce it as "indecent". Perhaps because of Helkiah's position at Court, the controversy did his reputation little damage and a second edition appeared in 1631. How much of the book was original has been disputed: it has been described as a compilation, with little original observation; some critics accused Helkiah of outright plagiarism.

Title page of Microcosmographia

== Keeper of Bedlam ==
In 1619 he was appointed Keeper of Bethlem Royal Hospital, popularly known as "Bedlam", the principal London hospital for the treatment of the mentally ill. He was the first qualified doctor to hold the office. He had conducted a vigorous campaign to remove his predecessor, Thomas Jenner, due to his lack of the proper qualifications. His record at Bedlam, as elsewhere, is controversial. His admirers called him a reformer who pioneered the humane treatment of the mentally ill: his critics claimed that he embezzled funds and was usually absent from the hospital, deputising his duties to his son-in-law, Thomas Bedford. Most serious was the complaint that the care of patients was so neglected that many were "like to starve". Food intended for the patients was often stolen by the hospital steward, whom the patients had to bribe to hand it over or go without. Helkiah was often accused of attacking others for faults of which he was himself guilty, and his denunciation of his predecessor Jenner for incompetence was unlikely to have been forgotten. His attempts to break the long-standing oversight of the administration of Bedlam by the Governors of the Bridewell Prison were unsuccessful, and the inevitable quarrel with the Governors of Bridewell merely made him more enemies.

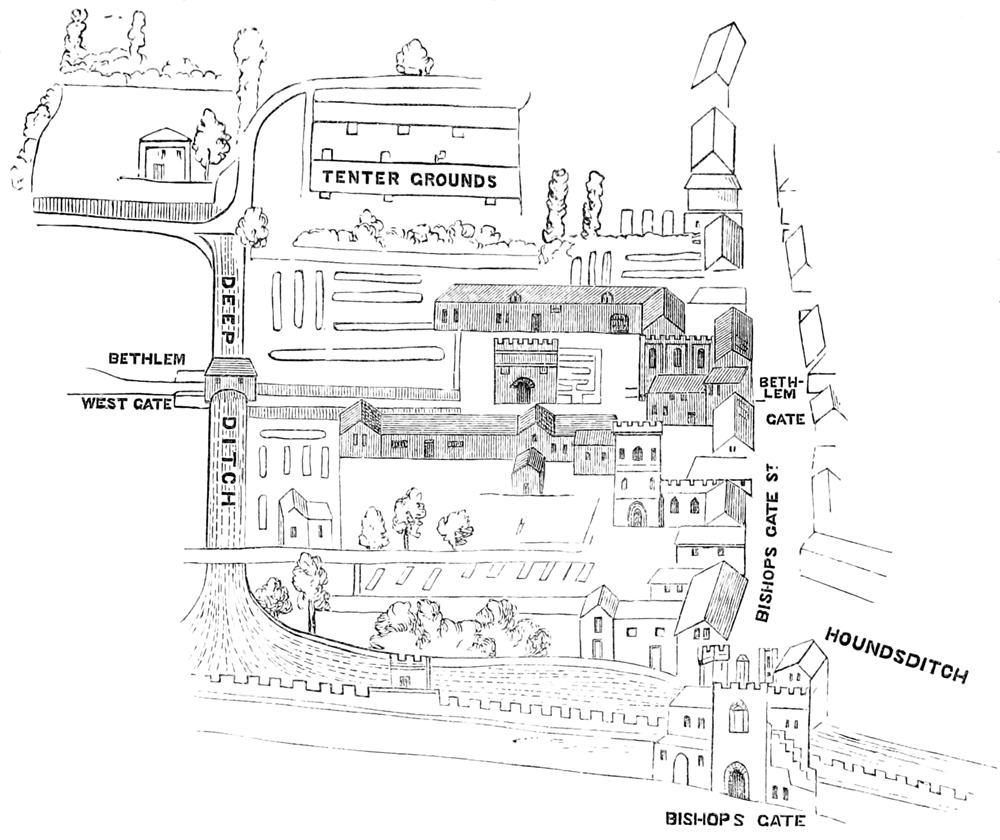
Plan of the first Bethlem Royal Hospital

Complaints about his conduct became so numerous that an inquiry was held in 1632. It covered the charges of mismanagement, corruption by the steward, and failure to feed the patients. Most serious perhaps was the charge of failing to make any effort to cure the patients of their mental illness. The death of King James I in 1625 had removed Helkiah's protection as a royal favourite, and he was found guilty and removed from office. He was the last Keeper to be appointed simply on the basis of royal patronage.

== Last years ==
The cost of defending himself at the inquiry is said to have greatly impoverished him, and in 1635 he resigned his fellowship of the College of Physicians. He retired to Clerkenwell: so little is known of his last years that he is sometimes thought to have died in 1635, but there is a record of his burial at St James's Church, Clerkenwell in March 1648.

Little is known of his family except that he had a daughter, Alice, who married Thomas Bedford. His sister Sarah, widow of the noted preacher Stephen Egerton, at her death in 1624 left legacies to both Helkiah and Alice, but does not mention Helkiah's wife, who had presumably died by then.
