= Cloghan Castle =

There are several structures named Cloghan Castle, all in Ireland:

- Cloghan Castle in County Cork
- Cloghan Castle in County Offaly
- Loughrea Castle (also known as Cloghan Castle) in County Galway
