= Cloghan Castle (County Cork) =

Ruined tower house in Ireland

Coordinates: 51°30′08″N 9°17′57″W

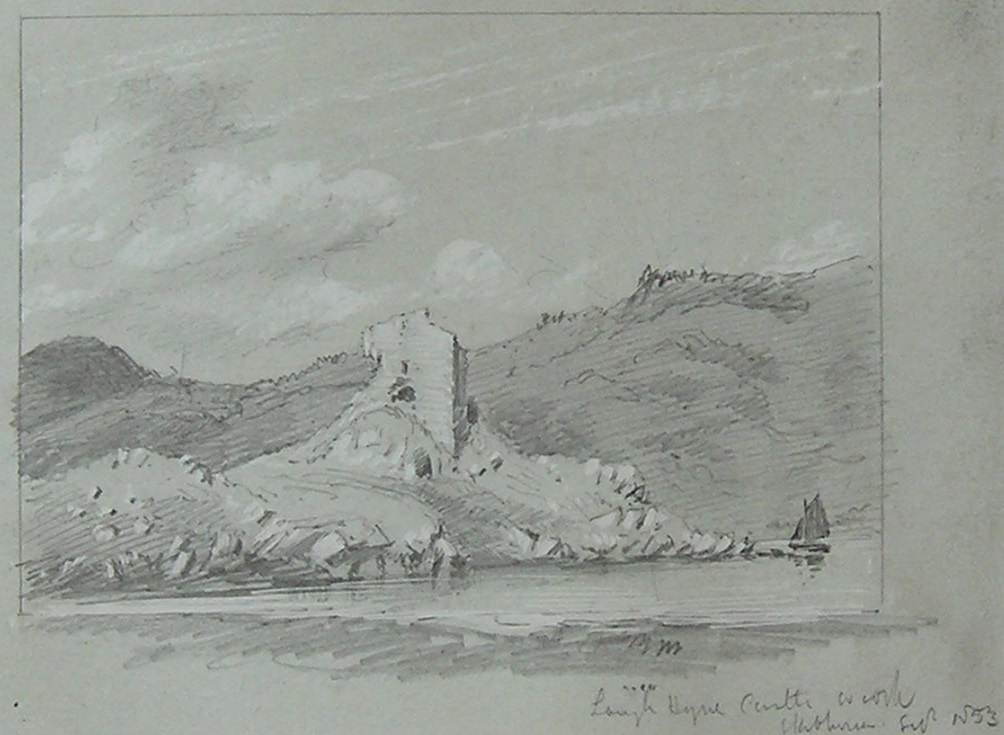
A pencil sketch by George Victor Du Noyer in 1853

Cloghan Castle (Irish: An Clochán) is a ruined tower house on Castle Island in Lough Hyne in West Cork, Ireland. Although it no longer stands, it was originally at least three storeys tall. Castle Cloghan was once the main stronghold of the Irish clan O'Driscoll, but was abandoned after their Chief, Sir Fineen O'Driscoll, died there in 1629. The mid-19th century collapse of the ruins is said to have been caused by the barking of a ghostly black dog.

== Description ==
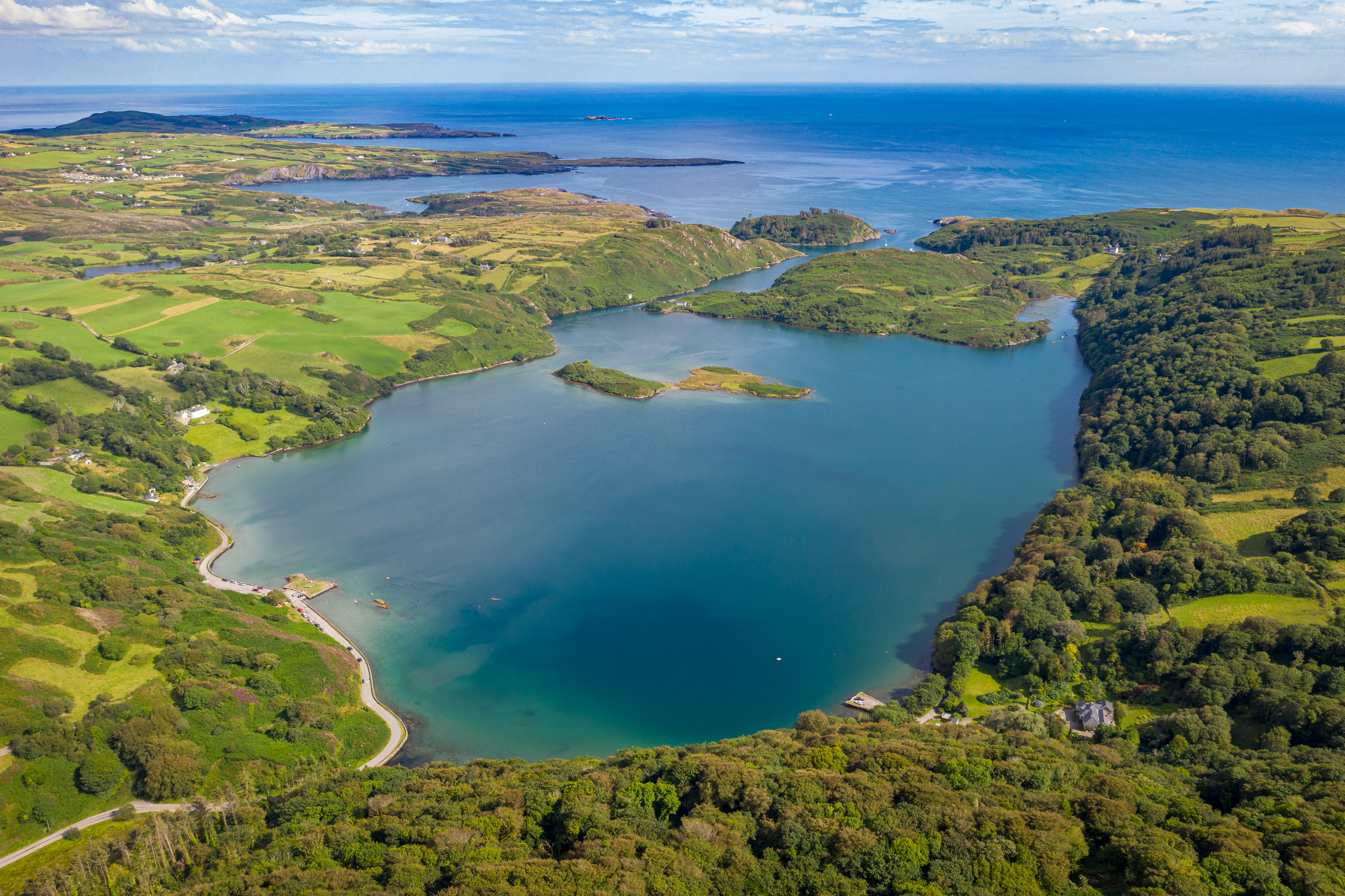
Castle Island in Lough Hyne

Cloghan Castle is located on a mound on the south-east side of Castle Island, in Lough Hyne, West Cork, Ireland. Lough Hyne is an unusually deep sea lough, with depths up to 44 metres (144 ft), and has fierce waters and a large tidal range. When combined with high ground of up to 200 metres (660 ft) surrounding the lough, this makes it relatively secure from sea and land. The island is reachable only by boat, and relatively low-lying.

Cloghan Castle is largely ruined, though some above-ground stonework remains. It was a square-sided tower house with an enclosure or extension constructed on its eastern side. Only the south-western corner of the tower house and the north-eastern corner of the enclosure survive. Based on surviving remains the tower measured around 8.5 by 11.4 metres (28 ft × 37 ft) externally and 4 by 6 metres (13 ft × 20 ft) internally; its long-axis ran approximately east–west. The enclosure was approximately 5.5 metres (18 ft) square.

The remains of the tower show it to be formed of rough-hewn blocks of the local Old Red Sandstone. The blocks are small enough to have been placed by hand without the need for any lifting tackle. They were bonded with a poor-strength mortar, lavishly applied. The inside of the walls may once have been rendered with a mortar mix. The entrance does not survive but was potentially sited in the eastern wall, as is the entrance at Castle Salem, which is of similar design.

A single loophole survives in the west wall of the ground floor. This may have been defensive in nature, but probably its main use was as a source of light and air. A slopstone, for washing, was positioned directly beneath the loophole. The first floor was supported on timber joists, the sockets of which remain in the masonry; there were probably eight joists spanning the tower on the north–south axis. At first-floor level there are the remains of another loophole in the western wall, but it has been much robbed out. The second floor, likely the principal chamber (though the tower may well have had further storeys), was supported on a barrel vault ceiling.

The enclosure to the east probably provided additional accommodation. It was constructed of smaller stones, closely fitted together. Though the same low-strength mortar was used to bond the stones, the construction of the surviving wall is superior to that seen in the tower. The north wall of the enclosure holds the remains of a window larger than the loopholes in the tower.

Additionally there are two short sections of surviving drystone wall to the north and south of the structure. These are possibly remnants of additional structures or of an outer wall. The northern section runs from the north wall of the tower house, while the surviving southern section, also on a north–south axis, lies some 7 metres (23 ft) away from the wall of the enclosure.

It is possible that further remains exist below ground level as the site has not been subject to archaeological investigation. In general, the remains seem to have survived with little robbing. The ruins lie abandoned and covered in ivy.

== History ==
The Irish name of the castle, An Clochán, means "stony place". The settlement of Baile an Oileain to the east of the Lough may have its origins as the sept land associated with the castle.

The castle was owned by the O'Driscoll family, who, during the medieval period, were one of the richest in Ireland. The castle became the seat of the O'Driscoll family by 1629, when Sir Fineen O'Driscoll, family chief since 1573, moved there, having leased Baltimore Castle to Sir Thomas Crooke. Sir Fineen died at Cloghan Castle shortly afterwards. The castle was probably abandoned following the chief's death, as it disappears from the historic record.

Cloghan Castle is probably the one referred to in the 17th-century Pacata Hibernia as a hotbed of rebellion during the reign of Elizabeth I, rather than the castle of the same name at Lissangle, which belonged to the Coppinger family, who were loyal to Elizabeth. The castle collapsed in the mid-19th century. Folklore states that it was due to the barking of the ghost of a black dog that haunted the tower, though it is likely that the poor-quality mortar used in its construction led to the collapse. Also, in folklore, the castle is said to have been the home of a legendary king with the ears of a donkey.

The remains were drawn by George Victor Du Noyer in February 1853, his pencil sketch is now in the collection of the Royal Society of Antiquaries of Ireland. W. B. Yeats also sketched there in the summer of 1919.

== See also ==
- Lusmagh § Cloghan Castle for Cloghan Castle in County Offaly
- Loughrea Castle (also known as Cloghan Castle) in County Galway
