= Sack of Baltimore =

War in the Mediterranean Sea (1677–1682)

Coordinates: 51.48341°N 9.37168°W

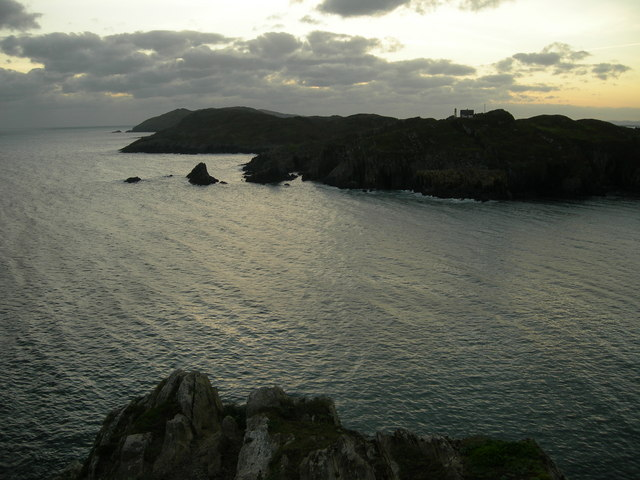
Entrance to Baltimore bay

The sack of Baltimore took place on 20 June 1631, when the village of Baltimore in West Cork, Ireland, was attacked by pirates from the Barbary Coast of North Africa – the raiders included Algerians and Ottoman Turks. The attack was the largest by Barbary slave traders on Ireland.

The attack was led by a Dutch captain from Haarlem, Murad Reis the Younger, who had been enslaved by the Barbary pirates and set free following his conversion to Islam. Murad's force of the regency of Algiers was led to the village by an Irish Catholic fisherman of Old English descent named John Hackett – the captain of a fishing boat that had been captured shortly before the raid – purportedly in exchange for his release, although dark conspiracy theories regarding Hackett, Sir Walter Coppinger, and Murad persist. Hackett was subsequently hanged from the cliff-top outside the village for conspiracy.

== Attack ==
Murad's crew, made up of European renegades (Note: Individuals who renounced their Christian faith and converted to Islam were called "renegades".) and Algerians, launched their covert attack on the remote village of Baltimore on 20 June 1631. They captured at least 107 villagers, mostly English settlers along with some local Irish people (some reports put the number as high as 237). The attack was focused on the area of the village known to this day as the Cove. The villagers were put in irons and taken to a life of slavery in Algiers.

== Aftermath ==
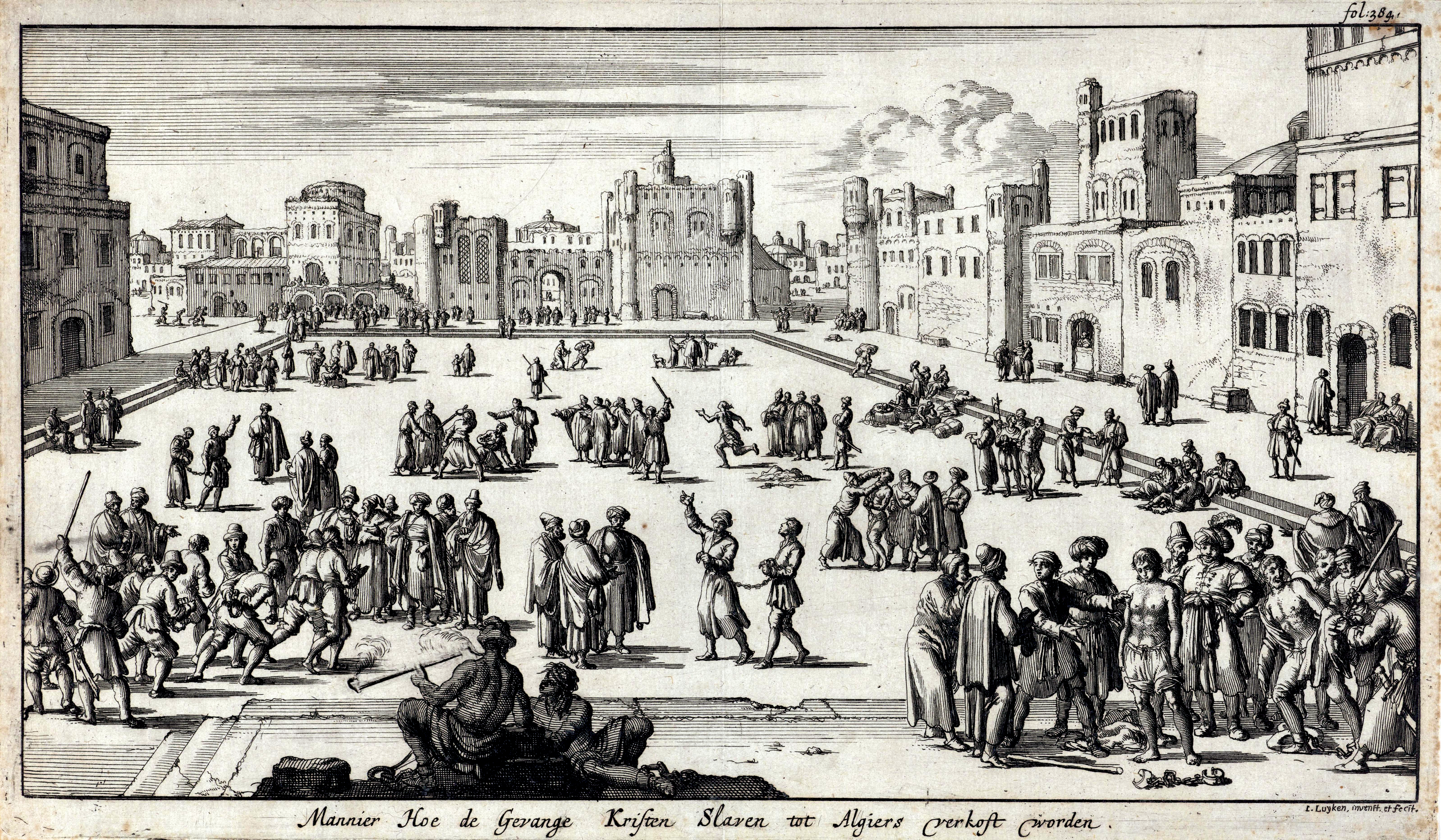
Slave market in Algiers, 1684

Some prisoners were destined to live out their days as galley slaves, rowing for decades without ever setting foot on shore while others would spend long years in a harem or as labourers. Only three at most of the slaves ever returned to Ireland. One was ransomed almost at once and two others in 1646. In the aftermath of the raid, the remaining villagers moved to Skibbereen, and Baltimore was virtually deserted for generations.

== Conspiracy theory ==
In his book The Stolen Village, Des Ekin theorizes that Sir Walter Coppinger, a wealthy Recusant lawyer and moneylender of Hiberno-Norse descent from Cork — who had become the main landowner in the area after the death of Sir Thomas Crooke, 1st Baronet, the founder of the English colony — secretly bribed the Barbary pirates to attack the village in collaboration with the derbhfine of deceased Irish clan chief, Sir Fineen O'Driscoll. It was the Clan O'Driscoll that rented Baltimore and its lucrative pilchard fishing grounds to the English Puritan settlers, in return for the prematurely ended regular payment of black rent, on 20 June 1610. The lease for the land was for twenty-one years at the end of which the title for the land was set, as collateral for Sir Fineen's debts, to transfer to Sir Walter Coppinger on 20 June 1631.

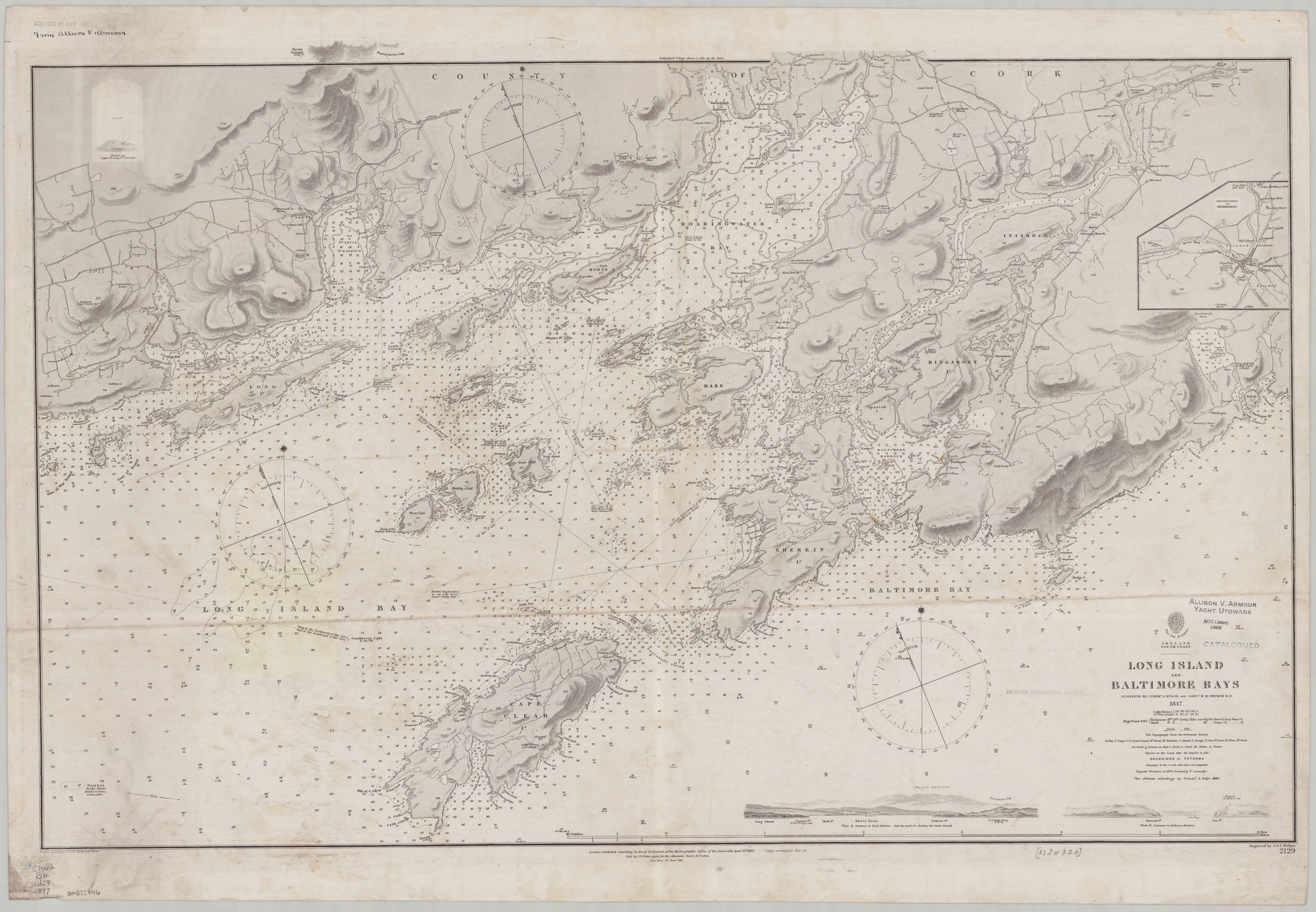
Baltimore Bay on the south coast

Coppinger, before the time was over on the lease, tried by an assortment of means to evict the Puritans from Baltimore and gain early access to the highly valuable fishing trade. After a long period of legal wrangling and harassment, it was decided in 1630 by the courts that the settlers could not be evicted because of the large amount they had invested in the development of the town and Coppinger was ordered to rent the land to the Puritans in perpetuity. Ekin suggests that Coppinger secretly used aristocratic O'Driscoll exiles in Habsburg Spain as go-betweens and hired Murad Reis to enslave the English Puritans of Baltimore. While Ekin acknowledges that there is no concrete proof of this theory, however, he does believe the raid happening on 20 June 1631—the exact date the Baltimore lease was to expire—was no coincidence.

On the other hand, Murad may just as easily have planned and executed the raid without any need for Coppinger's encouragement or help. Baltimore was not only a profitable center of commercial fishing, but was also in the early 1600s even more profitable as a base for privateering and even for piracy. Despite official discouragement and orders to the contrary from King James I, all local judges, as Coppinger had found, and even the vice-admiral of Munster were complicit in the Baltimore commerce raiding trade. The town's entire population were also alleged to be involved; all the Puritan women of Baltimore were reputed to be either the wives or mistresses of pirates. Murad Rais and his crew may well have chosen to attack Baltimore, therefore, in order to eliminate competition and/or to punish the local population for commerce raids against Ottoman shipping.

According to Cervantes scholar and Hispanic studies professor María Antonia Garcés, surviving accounts by former enslaved Christians in Ottoman Algeria, such as the posthumously published 1612 Topographia of Algiers by Antonio de Sosa, provides yet another lead. Sosa later recalled that the Muslim community and pirate crews of Algiers included former Christians from every imaginable ethnicity of Europe, Asia, Africa, and the New World. He also made repeated references to Algiers, intriguingly, having a community of Irish "New Muslims" and "Turks by profession", who had also been captured and enslaved, chosen to buy their own freedom through conversion to Islam, and joined local crews of the Barbary pirates. Furthermore, it is well-documented that the authorities had advanced intelligence that Murad planned to attack a port town along the County Cork coast, although Kinsale was incorrectly thought to be the target rather than Baltimore.

== In literature and the arts ==
- The fictionalized capture and enslavement of Sir Fineen O'Driscoll's daughter Máire during the raid inspired Thomas Davis' poem, "The Sack of Baltimore". The poem has the line: "And when to die a death of fire that noble maid they bore, She only smiled, O'Driscoll's child; she thought of Baltimore."
- A detailed account of the sack of Baltimore can be found in the book The Stolen Village: Baltimore and the Barbary Pirates by Des Ekin.
- In 2015, the raid inspired the song "Roaring Waters" from the album Last of Our Kind by British hard rock band The Darkness. The band were inspired to write the song after learning of the incident while on Valentia Island, approximately 50 miles from Baltimore.
- The Sack of Baltimore is memorialized in the name of the pub "The Algiers", a historic gastropub in Baltimore, Ireland. The pub is notable for its North African decor.

== See also ==
- Sklavenkasse
- Slave raid of Suðuroy, raid on Faroe Islands in 1629
- Slavery in Africa
- Slavery in the Ottoman Empire
- Turkish Abductions, raid on Iceland in 1627
