= Jassa marmorata =

Scientific classification
- Kingdom: Animalia
- Phylum: Arthropoda
- Clade: Pancrustacea
- Class: Malacostraca
- Order: Amphipoda
- Family: Ischyroceridae
- Genus: Jassa
- Species: J. marmorata

Binomial name
- Jassa marmorata Holmes, 1905

Species of crustacean

Jassa marmorata is a species of tube-building amphipod. It is native to the northeast Atlantic Ocean but has been introduced into northeast Asia. J. marmorata are greyish in colour with reddish brown markings. The can grow to a length of up to 10 millimetres (0.39 in). They are generally found in fouling communities and intertidal areas where they build tubes of detritus and algae fragments using silky mucus secretions. They are remarkable for having two distinct morphs of males with two different mating strategies. The 'major' morphs are fighter males, while the 'minor' morphs are sneaker males.

J. marmorata is classified under the genus Jassa of the family Ischyroceridae. They are commonly confused with the closely related scud (Jassa falcata).
