= Ericthonius rubricornis =

Scientific classification
- Kingdom: Animalia
- Phylum: Arthropoda
- Clade: Pancrustacea
- Class: Malacostraca
- Order: Amphipoda
- Family: Ischyroceridae
- Genus: Ericthonius
- Species: E. rubricornis

Binomial name
- Ericthonius rubricornis (Stimpson, 1853)

Species of crustacean

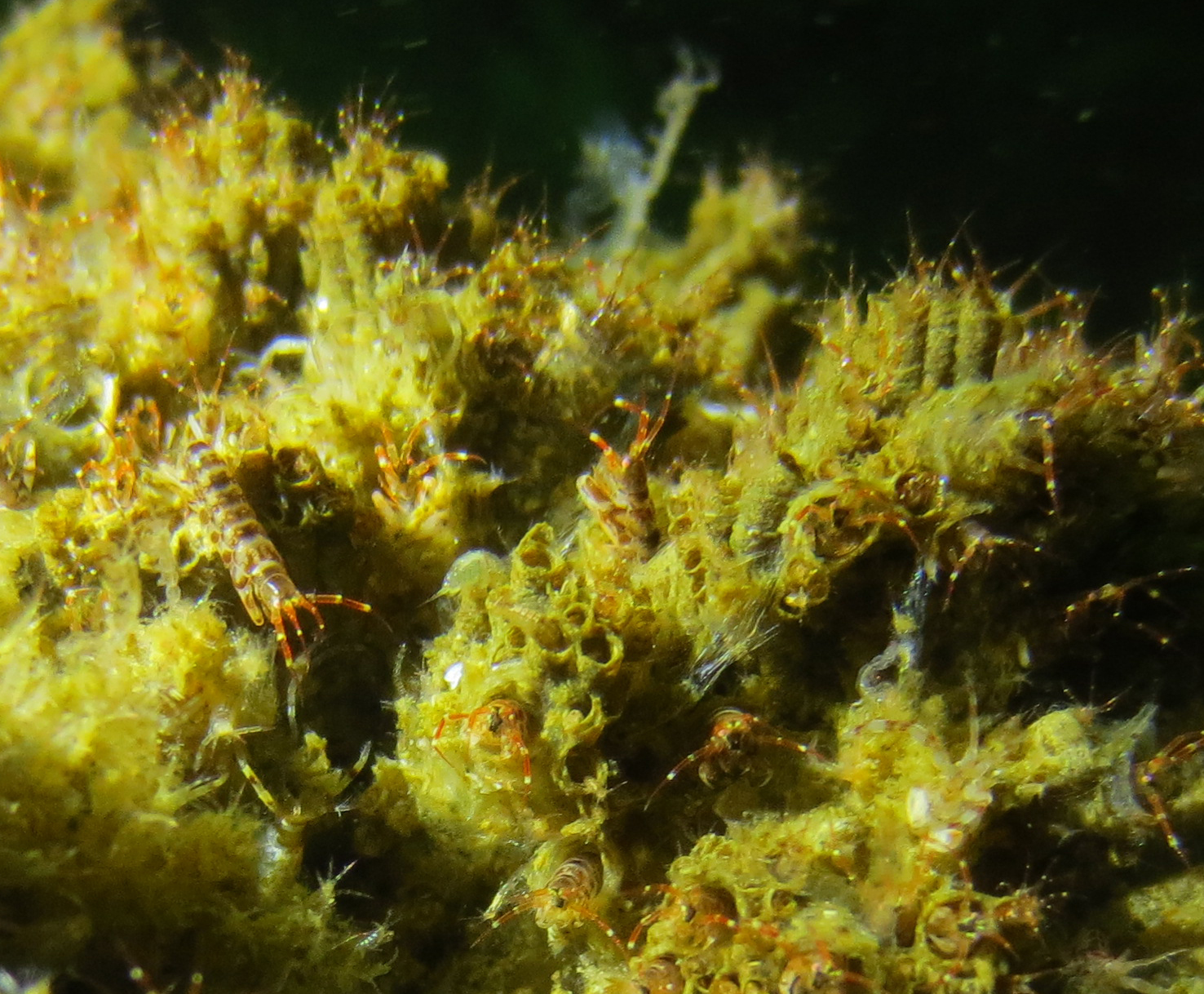

Ericthonius rubricornis is a species of amphipod in the family Ischyroceridae. It is found in South America, North America, and Europe.
