= Samuel Crooke =

Samuel Crooke (1575 – 1649) was a seventeenth-century cleric of the Church of England and a noted preacher. During the English Civil War he was a staunch supporter of the Parliamentary cause.

He was born at Great Waldingfield in Suffolk, second son of Thomas Crooke, rector of the parish and later reader at Gray's Inn; Samuel seems to have been a family name on the mother's side. His father was a prominent member of the "godly elite", whose Calvinist views caused the Church authorities to regard him with some suspicion, although his position at Gray's Inn protected him from any serious penalty. Samuel clearly inherited his father's religious views. Two of his brothers achieved fame: Sir Thomas Crooke, 1st Baronet, as the founder of Baltimore, County Cork, and Helkiah Crooke as royal physician and author of one of the first textbooks on anatomy. Samuel's brother-in-law, Stephen Egerton, was another leading Puritan preacher.

Samuel went to the Merchant Taylors' School, Northwood; he entered the University of Cambridge as a scholar of Pembroke Hall, and was elected a fellow, but the election was disallowed. Soon afterwards he became a fellow of Emmanuel College, Cambridge. He was appointed reader in the public schools, and in accordance with the college statutes he took holy orders in 1601. He was a fine linguist, who could speak French, Italian and Spanish and read Hebrew and Arabic.

In 1602 he was presented to the living of Wrington, Somerset by Sir John Capel. He was an eloquent preacher, and was said to be the first clergyman in the locality who brought "credit to religion". He married Judith Walsh, daughter of H. Walsh, a Suffolk clergyman, but had no children.

Little is recorded of him in middle life except that he educated the children of his brother Sir Thomas, and that Sir Thomas in his will of 1629 left legacies to Samuel and his wife. He is said to have caused controversy by his refusal to wear a surplice, upon which the dominant High Court faction in the Church which was led by Archbishop William Laud insisted, but which Samuel, like most radical Puritans, regarded as a symbol of Roman Catholicism. His sister Sarah, widow of Stephen Egerton, who died in 1624, left him her wedding ring as a legacy.

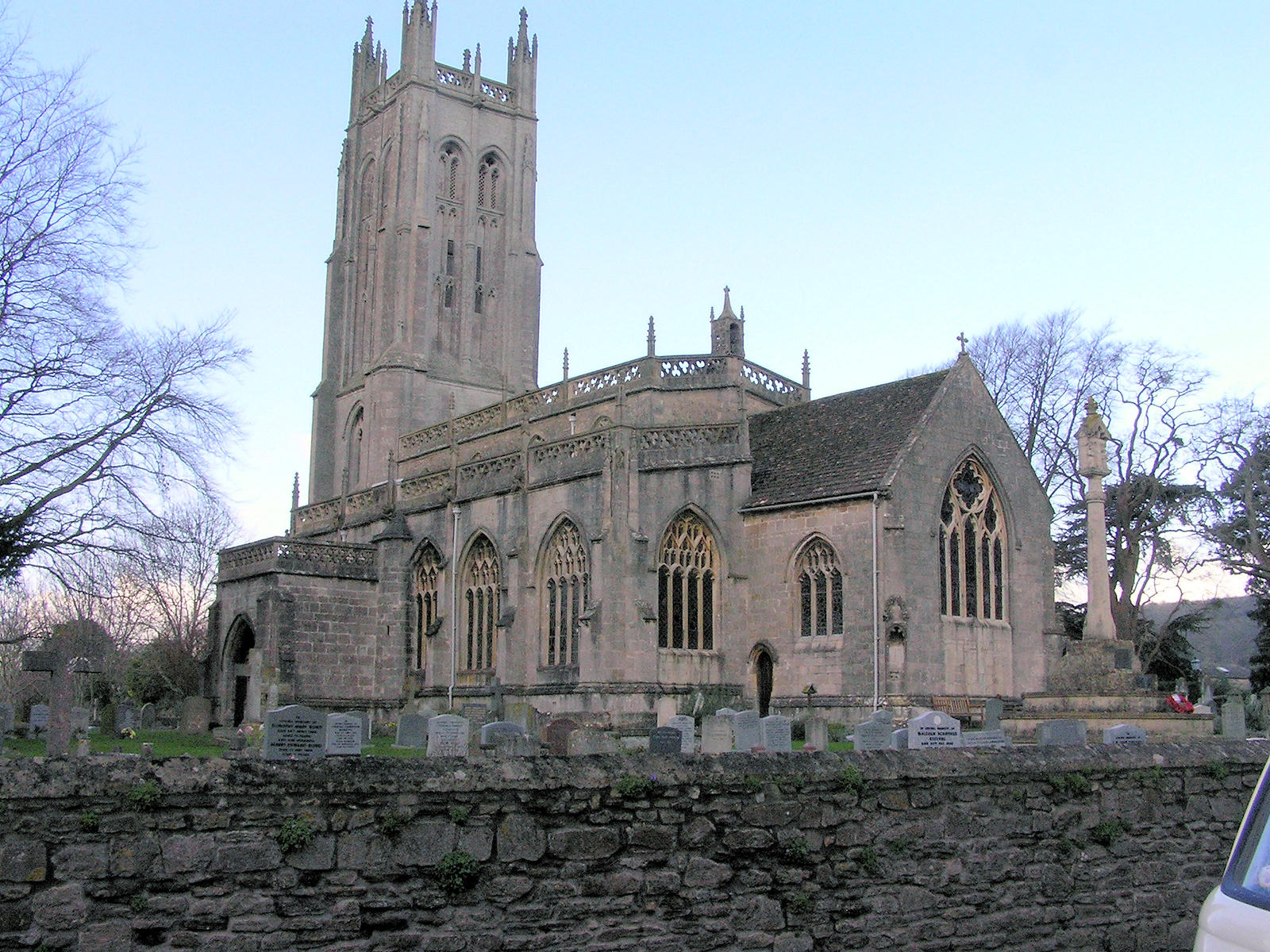
All Saints Church, Wrington-Samuel was vicar here for almost fifty years

He emerged from obscurity during the Civil War to become a champion of Parliament's cause. In 1642 when the House of Commons voted to set up an assembly of clergymen to reform the Church, Samuel was chosen as one of the representatives for Somerset, but never actually took his seat in the assembly. In 1643 when King Charles I took control of Somerset, Samuel was considered influential enough to be singled out as a man whose recantation would be valuable. He was persuaded, presumably under some form of duress, to sign articles expressing his abhorrence for any alteration to the Established Church. His recantation was greeted with joy by Royalists and fury by reformers, but was almost certainly not sincere, since he returned to the cause of reformation as soon as it was politically safe to do so. In 1648 when a scheme for "Presbyterian Government" for Somerset was drawn up Samuel was appointed a superintendent for the Wrington district.

He died in December 1649, aged almost 75: his funeral is said to have drawn a great crowd from all classes of life. He wrote a number of tracts and Latin verses.
