= Ischyrocerus fractus =

Scientific classification
- Kingdom: Animalia
- Phylum: Arthropoda
- Clade: Pancrustacea
- Class: Malacostraca
- Order: Amphipoda
- Family: Ischyroceridae
- Genus: Ischyrocerus
- Species: I. fractus

Binomial name
- Ischyrocerus fractus King and Holmes, 2004

Species of crustacean

Ischyrocerus fractus is a species of marine amphipod in the family Ischyroceridae. It is endemic to the southern half of Lough Hyne in Cork, Ireland.
