= Sir Thomas Crooke, 1st Baronet =

English-born politician, lawyer and landowner

Sir Thomas Crooke, 1st Baronet, of Baltimore (1574–1630) was an English-born politician, lawyer, and landowner in seventeenth-century Ireland. He is chiefly remembered as the founder of the town of Baltimore, County Cork, which he developed into a flourishing port but which was largely destroyed shortly after his death in the Sack of Baltimore 1631. He sat in the Irish House of Commons as a member for Baltimore in the Parliament of 1613–1615. He was the first of the Crooke baronets of Baltimore and an ancestor of the Crooke family of Crookstown House.

== Early life ==
He was born in Cransley, Northamptonshire, the eldest son of the Reverend Thomas Crooke; his mother was a Miss Samuel. His father was a Calvinist clergyman whose strong religious views often brought him into conflict with the English Crown, but who escaped serious censure, probably due to his position as the appointed preacher at Gray's Inn. Helkiah Crooke, Court physician to James I, was one of Sir Thomas's brothers, and Samuel Crooke, a preacher of some note, was another brother. Stephen Egerton, the leading Puritan preacher, married Thomas's sister Sarah. Egerton's niece, Margaret Tyndal Winthrop, was the third wife of John Winthrop, who became a coloniser with a much wider vision than Crooke's, being several times Governor of the Massachusetts Bay Colony. Crooke and Winthrop, although they must have been acquainted, are not known to have been particularly close friends, but Crooke's sister Sarah was a close friend of Margaret Winthrop and left her a substantial legacy at her death in 1624.

Thomas spent much of his childhood in Suffolk, where his father served for many years as vicar of Great Waldingfield. The younger Thomas, on his father's petition, was admitted to Gray's Inn in 1597. He is said to have acquired a successful practice at the English Bar, but after his father's death in 1598, he turned his mind towards colonisation. His motives appear to have been twofold: to establish a thriving commercial centre and to create a safe haven for those who shared his strong Calvinist views.

== The Settlement of Baltimore ==
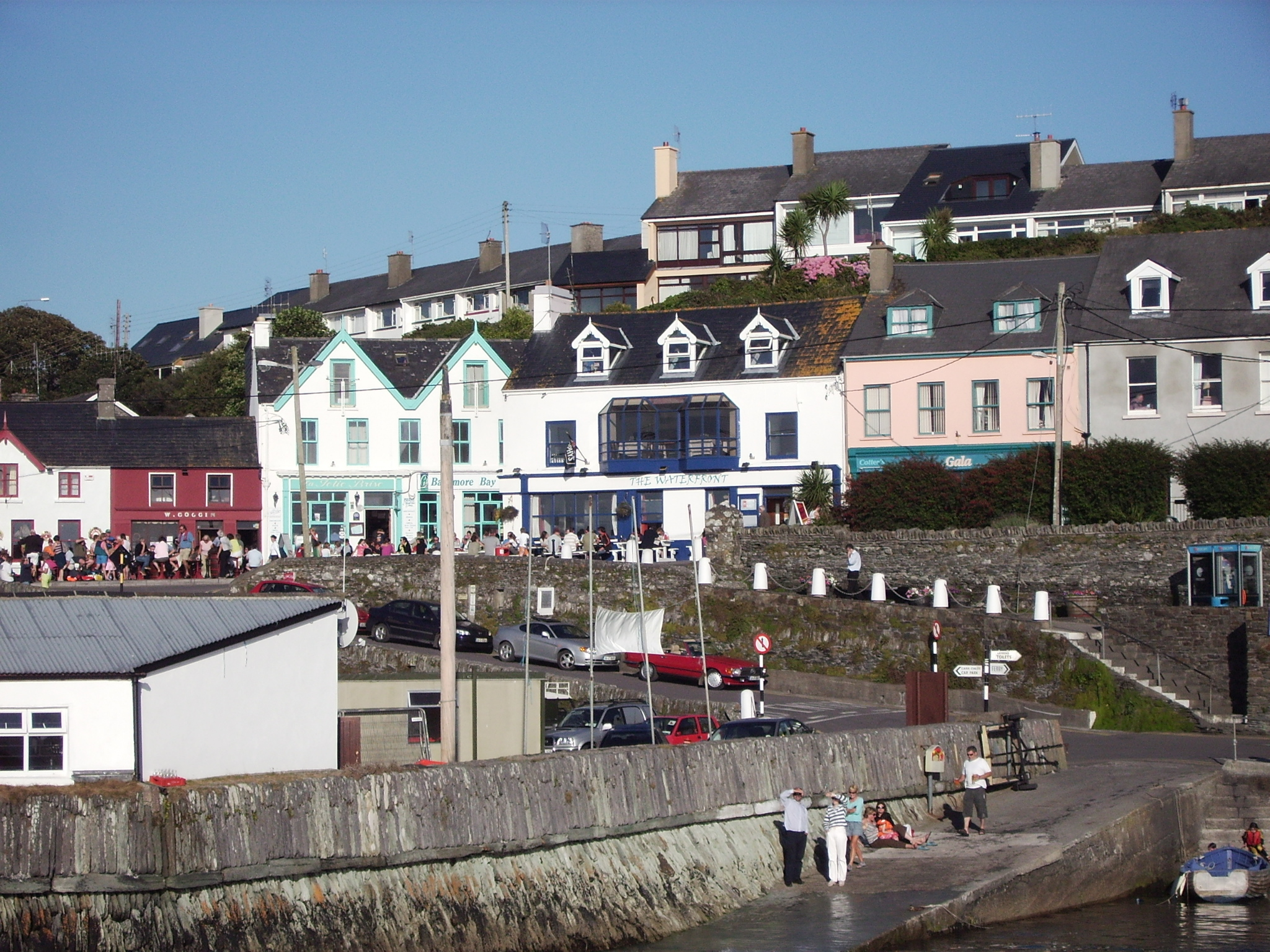
Baltimore, his foundation, present day

In about the year 1600 Crooke entered an agreement with Sir Fineen O'Driscoll, the Gaelic lord of Baltimore in County Cork, to establish an English colony in Baltimore. Their agreement was disrupted by the closing stages of the Nine Years War. O'Driscoll throughout his long career, had been an ally of the English Crown, and was something of a royal favourite of Queen Elizabeth I; but his relatives persuaded him, against his own better judgement, to take the Irish side at the Battle of Kinsale. After the failure of the Irish cause at Kinsale, most of his relatives fled the country, and Sir Fineen himself only obtained a royal pardon with difficulty. His daughter Eileen married into the prominent Coppinger family, who were to cause Sir Thomas much trouble throughout his career.

In 1605 Crooke decided to regularise the matter: he surrendered the extensive lands granted to him by O'Driscoll to King James I and had them regranted back to him. James disapproved of Crooke's Calvinism, but he was pragmatic enough to see the advantages to the Crown of a strong English presence in West Cork. In 1607 the town was given the right to hold a weekly market and two fairs a year. In 1612 it was incorporated as a borough, with a "sovereign" (Crooke himself) and twelve burgesses. Baltimore was given the right to return two members to the Irish House of Commons, with the franchise known as a potwalloper (that is, a constituency where every male householder with a hearth wide enough to boil or "wallop" a pot had the vote). Crooke himself sat in the Irish Parliament of 1613–15. He reached the high point of his fortune in 1624 when he was created a baronet.

At the same time, he renewed his legal practice and was called to the Irish Bar. He became a member of the King's Inns, but at the surprisingly late date of 1628, just two years before his death. His eldest son Samuel entered the Inns in the same year.

== Development of Baltimore ==
The town of Baltimore thrived from the beginning: we are told that Crooke "divided the town into tenements with lots for gardens, and gave to each settler land convenient for building and grazing". It grew prosperous as a centre for the pilchard fisheries and the wine trade. From the foundation of the colony, however, there were repeated accusations that Baltimore's real prosperity depended on piracy, and that all its inhabitants, including Crooke himself, were pirates or the accomplices of pirates.

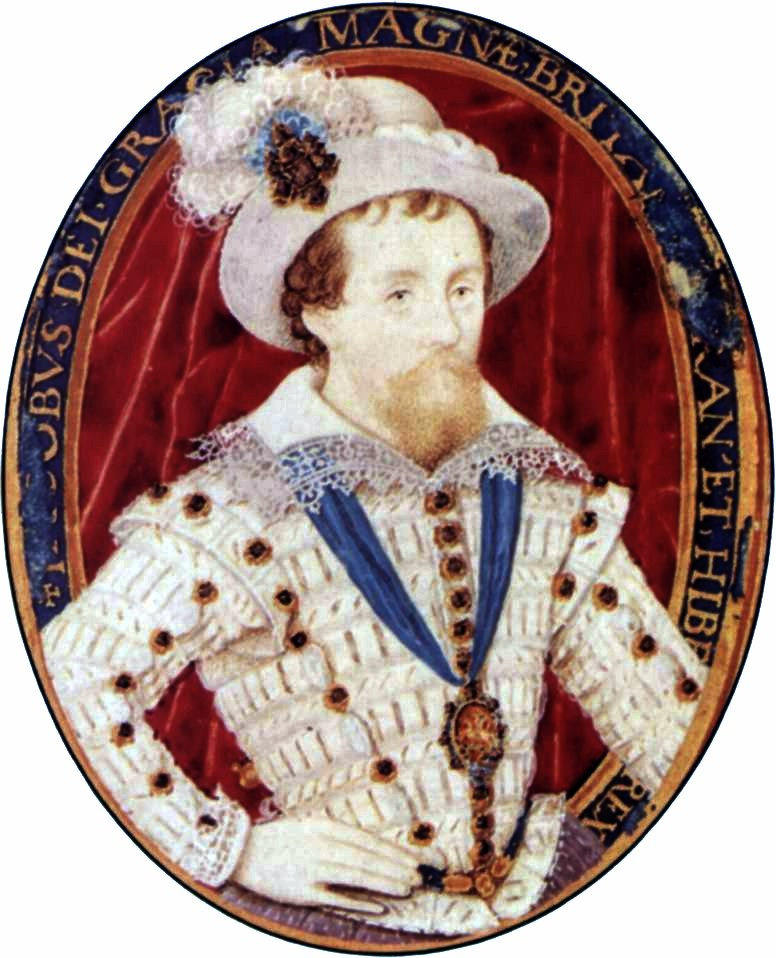
Portrait of James I by Nicholas Hilliard

=== Charge of piracy ===
The coast of West Cork has many deep sheltered coves which are suitable for smuggling, and the O'Driscolls had for years been widely believed to take advantage of this to engage in piracy. Not surprisingly, similar accusations were made against Crooke, and in 1608 the Privy Council summoned him to London to answer a number of charges, including one that he slaughtered cattle in his own yard to victual the pirate ships. Ominously, the charge was phrased in terms of a final verdict that he had been a "chief maintainer and abettor of notorious pirates". Crooke denied all the charges, and by now he had gained the goodwill of most of the influential men in Munster, including William Lyon, Bishop of Cork, Richard Boyle, 1st Earl of Cork, and Henry Danvers, 1st Earl of Danby, Lord President of Munster. His friends spoke up for him: Bishop Lyon in particular praised his extraordinary achievement in having created a well-ordered town out of nothing in less than 5 years. The Privy Council, despite what appeared to be a preliminary finding that he was guilty, in the end exonerated Crooke completely, but not everyone was satisfied: the authorities in Venice continued to call Baltimore "a nest of pirates", and it was claimed that the entire population of the town were implicated in the illicit business. Historians are still divided as to whether or not, and if so to what extent Crooke condoned or engaged in piracy. The more cynical view is that the Privy Council was convinced of Crooke's guilt, but was unwilling to damage the growing prosperity of Baltimore by taking decisive action against him.

== Conflict with Sir Walter Coppinger ==
From the start of his Irish career, Crooke was forced to contend with the increasing power of the wealthy Roman Catholic lawyer Sir Walter Coppinger. Coppinger came from one of the most prominent families in Cork city; though he himself was of Viking rather than Gaelic descent, he was hostile to the English settlers, and he had a reputation for ruthlessness. In his defence, it must be said that his brother Richard had married Eileen O'Driscoll, daughter of Sir Fineen O'Driscoll, and the Coppingers may honestly have believed that they had a better right to Baltimore than Crooke did.

From the foundation of the colony, Coppinger harassed the settlers with dubious legal claims to ownership of their lands. Eventually, in 1610 a compromise was reached: Crooke, Coppinger and Fineen O'Driscoll jointly granted a lease of Baltimore to the settlers for a term of 21 years. This gave the settlers a solid claim to their lands, but Coppinger soon made it clear that he had no intention of observing the agreement. Crooke, with his wealth, baronetcy, and influential friends, was personally secure enough, but the Baltimore settlers were subjected to constant harassment.

In 1616 Crooke and his fellow settlers brought a lawsuit against Coppinger in the Court of Castle Chamber, the Irish equivalent of Star Chamber, alleging numerous acts of aggression against them: Coppinger was found guilty on one count of riot but cleared of the other charges. However, Castle Chamber was not noted for providing effective remedies for litigants and this verdict did Crooke little good.

In 1618 Crooke, despairing of obtaining justice in the Irish courts, appealed to the Privy Council in London to protect the settlers against Coppinger's "malicious and covetous desire to supplant them" both by "bloody riot" and by fraudulent claims to their titles. No firm decision was taken, and Crooke renewed his petition before the new King Charles I in 1626. The King, noting that Castle Chamber was apparently divided on the issue, ordered a hearing before the Star Chamber. The case was still proceeding when Crooke died in 1630; it seems that the authorities were reluctant to decide finally either in favour of Coppinger or of the settlers.

== Legacy- the Sack of Baltimore ==
In 1631 Algerian pirates raided Baltimore and carried away more than 100 settlers, who were later sold into slavery in North Africa. A handful of them were eventually ransomed, but the vast majority never saw Ireland again. This dealt the town a blow from which it has never fully recovered. Whatever Sir Thomas Crooke's faults, most notably the charge, which is still widely believed, that he made Baltimore into a pirate's nest, it was his intelligence and energy which had made the town thrive, and, it has been said, it seems symbolically appropriate that it should collapse soon after his death.

== Family ==
By his wife, Mary Jackson, Thomas had three sons: Sir Samuel Crooke, 2nd Baronet, Thomas, a barrister of Gray's Inn, who was still living in 1624 (although he is not mentioned in his father's 1629 will) and James, who was still living in 1634. They had at least two daughters: Judith, who married as his second wife the landowner and writer Sir Vincent Gookin, by whom she had at least seven children, and a second daughter, who is referred to in her brother Samuel's will (although curiously not in her father's), who married a Mr Salmon (this was probably James Salmon of Castlehaven, a prominent local landowner). In his will, Thomas refers to his "son-in-law" Arthur Jackson: the word "son-in-law" was then interchangeable with "stepson", so Arthur was very likely Lady Crooke's son by a previous marriage. In his own will, Arthur refers to Lady Crooke as his mother.

Thomas left his estate to his widow, with legacies to his daughter Judith; his stepson Arthur Jackson and his wife Mary; his brothers Samuel, "dear Helkiah" and Richard ("for his kindness to my children"); his sister Rachel Rosse (described as "much impoverished"), who was the wife of Henry Rosse, goldsmith, his "dear sister in law" Judith, wife of Samuel; and "good old Aunt Hudson" (who was still living in 1635).

The third baronet, also called Thomas, dropped the use of the title, apparently as a condition of his marriage settlement with an heiress of the MacCarthy family. The family lived at Crookstown House for several generations; it later passed by inheritance to the Warren baronets.

Baronetage of Ireland
New creation	Baronet (of Baltimore); 1624–1630	Succeeded by Samuel Crooke
