= Listed buildings in Great Waldingfield =

Civil Parish in Suffolk, England

Great Waldingfield is a village and civil parish in the Babergh District of Suffolk, England. It contains 42 listed buildings that are recorded in the National Heritage List for England. Of these one is grade I, one is grade II* and 40 are grade II.

This list is based on the information retrieved online from Historic England.

== Key ==
Grade	Criteria
I	Buildings that are of exceptional interest
II*	Particularly important buildings of more than special interest
II	Buildings that are of special interest

== Listing ==
Name	Grade	Location	Type	Completed (Note: The date given is the date used by Historic England as significant for the initial building or that of an important part in the structure's description.)	Date designated	Grid ref. (Note: The grid reference is based on the British national grid reference system, sometimes known as OSGB36, used by the Ordnance Survey.) Geo-coordinates	Notes	Entry number (Note: The "List Entry Number" is a unique number assigned to each listed building and scheduled monument by Historic England.)	Image	Wikidata
Babergh Hall	II*		house		10 January 1953	TL9031944490; 52°03′58″N 0°46′31″E		1036634	Babergh Hall More images	Q17532880
K6 Telephone Kiosk Opposite Prospect House	II				11 May 1989	TL9127843856; 52°03′36″N 0°47′20″E		1234035	Upload Photo	Q26527462
Power's Farmhouse	II				9 February 1978	TL9217343703; 52°03′30″N 0°48′06″E		1036635	Upload Photo	Q26288319
Brook House	II	Brook Street			9 February 1978	TL9256743442; 52°03′21″N 0°48′26″E		1285281	Upload Photo	Q26573987
The Cottage	II	Brook Streetat Waldingfield			9 February 1978	TL9282743449; 52°03′21″N 0°48′40″E		1036636	Upload Photo	Q26288320
25 Folly Road	II	25, Folly Road			25 January 1993	TL9052643481; 52°03′25″N 0°46′39″E		1033467	Upload Photo	Q26284949
Orchard Cottage	II	30, Folly Road			6 May 1997	TL9049043379; 52°03′22″N 0°46′37″E		1271812	Upload Photo	Q26561720
Barn to the Badleys	II	Folly Road			9 February 1978	TL9190343006; 52°03′08″N 0°47′51″E		1036638	Upload Photo	Q26288323
Morris Farmhouse	II	Folly Road			9 February 1978	TL9165143123; 52°03′12″N 0°47′38″E		1180871	Upload Photo	Q26476198
The Badley's	II	Folly Road			10 January 1953	TL9193643011; 52°03′08″N 0°47′52″E		1036637	Upload Photo	Q26288322
Barn Malting	II	Garrison Lane			23 March 1961	TL9044543282; 52°03′19″N 0°46′35″E		1351786	Upload Photo	Q26634856
Garrison Cottage	II	Garrison Lane			14 October 1976	TL9045443296; 52°03′19″N 0°46′35″E		1180883	Upload Photo	Q26476210
Malting Barn Cottage	II	Garrison Lane			9 February 1978	TL9037643239; 52°03′17″N 0°46′31″E		1285248	Upload Photo	Q26573955
Pumphouse	II	Garrison Lane			5 July 1976	TL9045743311; 52°03′20″N 0°46′35″E		1036639	Upload Photo	Q26288324
Rose Cottage	II	Garrison Lane			9 February 1978	TL9043643316; 52°03′20″N 0°46′34″E		1036640	Upload Photo	Q26288325
Brandeston Hall	II	Lavenham Road			10 January 1953	TL9145746783; 52°05′11″N 0°47′35″E		1036644	Upload Photo	Q26288329
Crinkle-crankle Wall West of Ardley House	II	Lavenham Road, Sudbury, CO10 6SF			13 October 2020	TL9074944241; 52°03′49″N 0°46′53″E		1471482	Upload Photo	Q100585404
Lavenham Road Farmhouse	II	Lavenham Road			9 February 1978	TL9121745472; 52°04′29″N 0°47′20″E		1180992	Upload Photo	Q26476333
The Old Rectory	II	Rectory Road			9 February 1978	TL9124543759; 52°03′33″N 0°47′18″E		1351790	Upload Photo	Q26634860
School Farmhouse	II	School Farm Lane			9 February 1978	TL9052946910; 52°05′16″N 0°46′46″E		1285214	Upload Photo	Q26573926
Bowling Green Farmhouse	II	The Heath			9 February 1978	TL9026243371; 52°03′22″N 0°46′25″E		1036643	Upload Photo	Q26288328
Great Waldingfield Hall	II	The Heath			9 February 1978	TL9028643078; 52°03′12″N 0°46′26″E		1351787	Upload Photo	Q26634857
Greencroft	II	The Heath			9 February 1978	TL9026643238; 52°03′17″N 0°46′25″E		1036642	Upload Photo	Q26288327
High Thatch	II	The Heath			9 February 1978	TL9025143146; 52°03′15″N 0°46′24″E		1351788	Upload Photo	Q26634858
Jasmine Cottage	II	The Heath			9 February 1978	TL9032343211; 52°03′17″N 0°46′28″E		1036641	Upload Photo	Q26288326
Low Thatch	II	The Heath			9 February 1978	TL9025643164; 52°03′15″N 0°46′25″E		1180937	Upload Photo	Q26476276
Rose Haven	II	The Heath			9 February 1978	TL9028843278; 52°03′19″N 0°46′26″E		1285236	Upload Photo	Q26573945
The Red House	II	The Heath			9 February 1978	TL9028543256; 52°03′18″N 0°46′26″E		1351789	Upload Photo	Q26634859
White Horse Inn	II	The Heath	inn		9 February 1978	TL9024943110; 52°03′13″N 0°46′24″E		1285257	White Horse Inn More images	Q26573964
Church of St Lawrence	I	The Street	church building		9 February 1978	TL9120343914; 52°03′38″N 0°47′16″E		1351751	Church of St Lawrence More images	Q17542540
High Trees	II	The Street			10 January 1953	TL9121543857; 52°03′36″N 0°47′16″E		1351772	Upload Photo	Q26634843
Lavender Cottage	II	The Street			9 February 1978	TL9132543903; 52°03′38″N 0°47′22″E		1351771	Upload Photo	Q26634842
Lawrence Cottage and Little Thatch	II	The Street			10 January 1953	TL9127143868; 52°03′37″N 0°47′19″E		1351810	Upload Photo	Q26634880
Owl Cottage	II	The Street			10 January 1953	TL9126143873; 52°03′37″N 0°47′19″E		1036603	Upload Photo	Q26288285
Rose Cottage and Farriers	II	The Street, CO10 0TN			9 February 1978	TL9128643875; 52°03′37″N 0°47′20″E		1036604	Upload Photo	Q26288286
Rose Tree Cottage	II	The Street			9 February 1978	TL9130943890; 52°03′37″N 0°47′21″E		1036605	Upload Photo	Q26288287
Waldingfield Lodge	II	The Street			9 February 1978	TL9114443931; 52°03′39″N 0°47′13″E		1036606	Upload Photo	Q26288288
Waldingfield Primary School	II	The Street			9 February 1978	TL9115743979; 52°03′40″N 0°47′13″E		1036645	Upload Photo	Q26288330
Walnut Tree Cottage	II	The Street			10 January 1953	TL9124843885; 52°03′37″N 0°47′18″E		1351809	Upload Photo	Q26634879
Willow Cottage	II	Upsher Green			21 August 1978	TL9177843745; 52°03′32″N 0°47′46″E		1033459	Upload Photo	Q26284940
White Hall	II	Valley Road, Sudbury, CO10 0RL			13 July 2018	TL9030342860; 52°03′05″N 0°46′26″E		1457342	Upload Photo	Q66479732

== See also ==
- Grade I listed buildings in Suffolk
- Grade II* listed buildings in Suffolk

== Sources ==
- Bettely, James; Pevsner, Nikolaus (2015) [1961], Suffolk: West, The Buildings of England, New Haven and London: Yale University Press, ISBN 978-0-300-19655-9
