= Ischyrocerus =

Scientific classification
- Kingdom: Animalia
- Phylum: Arthropoda
- Clade: Pancrustacea
- Class: Malacostraca
- Order: Amphipoda
- Family: Ischyroceridae
- Genus: Ischyrocerus; Krøyer, 1838

Genus of amphipod crustaceans

Ischyrocerus is a genus of amphipods in the family Ischyroceridae, first described by Henrik Nikolai Krøyer in 1838. The type species is Ischyrocerus anguipes Krøyer, 1838.

== Species ==
The genus Ischyrocerus comprises 31 species.

- Ischyrocerus albanovi Gurjanova, 1946
- Ischyrocerus anguipes Krøyer, 1838
- Ischyrocerus brevicornis (Sars G.O., 1879)
- Ischyrocerus brusilovi Gurjanova, 1933
- Ischyrocerus camptonyx Thurston, 1974
- Ischyrocerus chamissoi Gurjanova, 1951
- Ischyrocerus commensalis Chevreux, 1900
- Ischyrocerus cristatus Gurjanova, 1938
- Ischyrocerus dezhnevi Gurjanova, 1951
- Ischyrocerus elongatus Gurjanova, 1938
- Ischyrocerus enigmaticus Gurjanova, 1934
- Ischyrocerus fractus King & Holmes, 2004
- Ischyrocerus gurjanovae Kudrjaschov, 1975
- Ischyrocerus hanseni Stephensen, 1944
- Ischyrocerus hortator J.L. Barnard, 1964
- Ischyrocerus kapu J.L. Barnard, 1970
- Ischyrocerus krascheninnikovi Gurjanova, 1951
- Ischyrocerus laptevi Gurjanova, 1946
- Ischyrocerus latipes Krøyer, 1842
- Ischyrocerus malacus J.L. Barnard, 1964
- Ischyrocerus megacheir (Boeck, 1871)
- Ischyrocerus megalops Sars, 1894
- Ischyrocerus minutus Liljeborg, 1851
- Ischyrocerus nanoides (Hansen, 1888)
- Ischyrocerus pelagops J.L. Barnard, 1962
- Ischyrocerus rhodomelae Gurjanova, 1938
- Ischyrocerus serratus Gurjanova, 1938
- Ischyrocerus stephenseni Gurjanova, 1951
- Ischyrocerus tenuicornis (Sars, 1885)
- Ischyrocerus tuberculatus (Hoek, 1882)
- Ischyrocerus tzvetkovae Kudrjaschov, 1975
