= Stephen Egerton (priest) =

English priest

Stephen Egerton (1555?-1621?) was an English priest, a leading Puritan preacher of his time, who was also active in agitating for reform of the Church of England.

== Life ==
He was born in London about 1555, younger son of Thomas Egerton, mercer, and was educated at Peterhouse, Cambridge, where he took his M.A. degree in 1579. He had then already taken holy orders. He was one of the leaders in the formation of the presbytery at Wandsworth, Surrey, which has been described as the first presbyterian church in England. In 1584 he was suspended for refusing to subscribe to John Whitgift's articles, but shortly afterwards he was active in promoting the Book of Discipline. During the imprisonment of the separatists Henry Barrow and John Greenwood in 1590, Egerton was sent by the Bishop of London to confer with them, and several letters passed between him and them; but later in the same year, he himself was summoned, together with several other ministers, before the Court of High Commission, and was committed to the Fleet prison, where he remained about three years.

In 1598 he became minister of St. Anne's, Blackfriars, London. He was one of those chosen to present the millenary petition for the further reform of the church in 1603, and in May of the following year, he introduced a petition to the lower house of Convocation for the reformation of the prayer-book. He remained in his cure at Blackfriars till his death, which took place about 1621, being assisted in his latter years by William Googe, who succeeded him. He was described by Alexander Nowell, in a letter, as a "man of great learning and godliness."

== Family ==
He married in 1585 Sarah Crooke, daughter of Thomas Crooke. Sarah's father and her brother Samuel Crooke were both clergymen who shared Egerton's strongly Puritan beliefs; another of Sarah's brothers, Sir Thomas Crooke, 1st Baronet, is best remembered as the founder of the town of Baltimore, County Cork. They had no children; Sarah died in 1624, bequeathing her husband's death's head ring to her brother Thomas.

Stephen had obviously been very close to his sister Anne, widow of John Tyndal, who at her death in 1620 had bequeathed to her "kind and loving brother Stephen" a gilt tankard. Anne was the mother of Margaret Tyndal Winthrop, third wife of John Winthrop, Governor of the Massachusetts Bay Colony. Margaret and her aunt Sarah were close, and Sarah left a substantial legacy to Margaret.

== Works ==
Egerton published sermons, but few of them remain. Among those of his works still extant are A Brief Method of Catechising, first issued in 1594, which in 1644 reached a forty-fourth edition; and a translation from the French of Mathieu Virel entitled A Learned and Excellent Treatise containing all principal Grounds of the Christian Religion, the earliest edition of which now remaining is the fourth, published in 1597, and the latest the fourteenth in 1635. In addition to his own books he wrote introductions for several publications by his fellow puritans, including Richard Rogers, Robert Pricke, Baine, and Nicholas Byfield.

== Notes ==
Attribution

This article incorporates text from a publication now in the public domain: Stephen, Leslie, ed. (1889). "Egerton, Stephen". Dictionary of National Biography. Vol. 17. London: Smith, Elder & Co.
