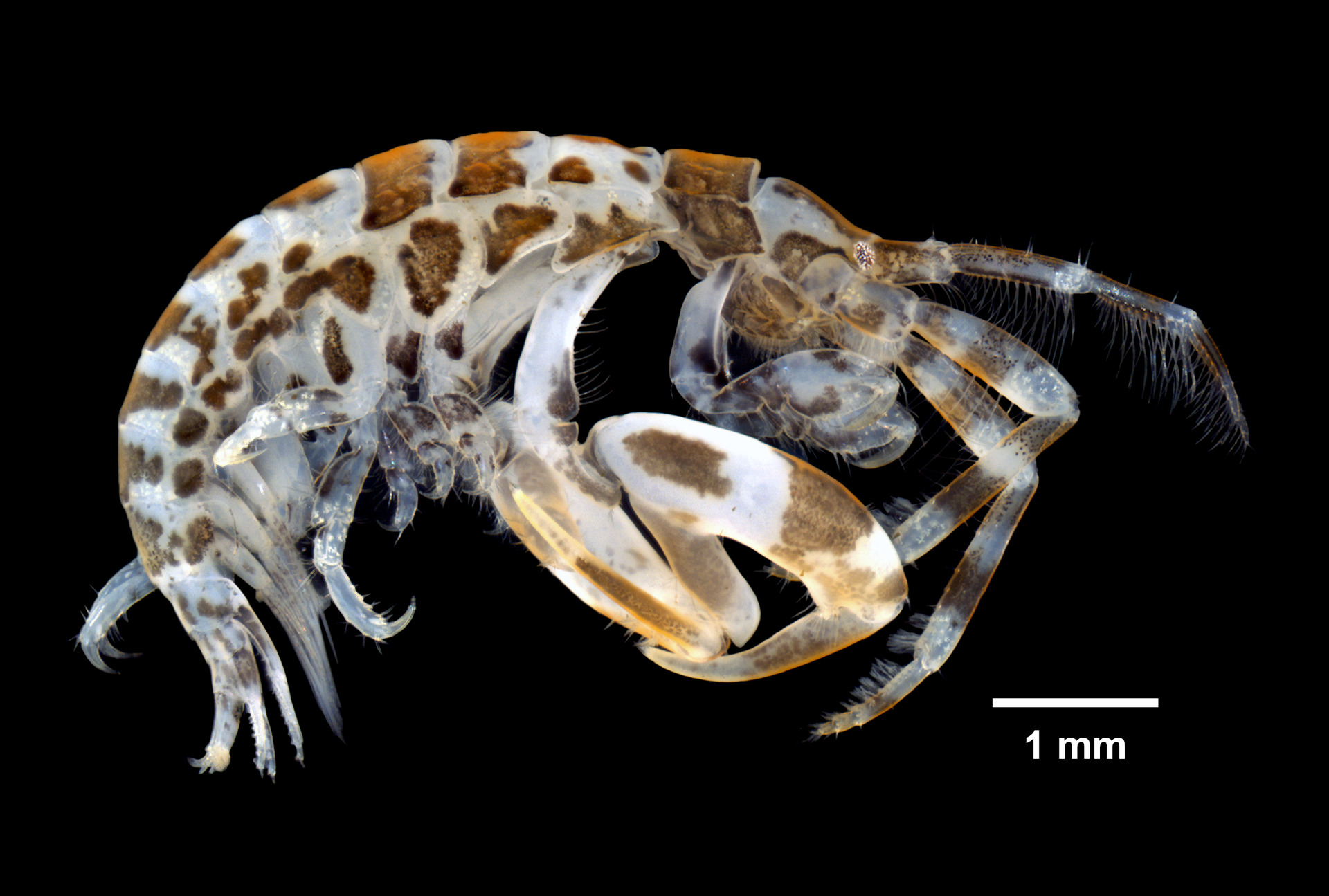

Scientific classification
- Domain: Eukaryota
- Kingdom: Animalia
- Phylum: Arthropoda
- Class: Malacostraca
- Order: Amphipoda
- Family: Ischyroceridae
- Genus: Jassa
- Species: J. falcata

Binomial name
- Jassa falcata (Montagu, 1808)

Synonyms
- Cerapus falcata Montagu; Jassa dentex Chevreux & Fage, 1925; Jassa pulchella Leach, 1814; Podocerus falcata

= Jassa falcata =

Species of crustacean

Jassa falcata, commonly known as scud, is a tube-dwelling amphipod.

== Ecology ==
Jassa falcata constructs tubes of debris. It is a fouling organism, growing on the bottoms of ships and slowing them down. J. falcata forms dense mats or nests. The male and the female live in different tubes. J. falcata feeds generally on hydroid growth on the bottom of rafts and ships. It is generally a suspension feeder normally found on sediment areas.

== Description ==
Amphipods have two pairs of antennae. In J. falcata the first antennae have two-segmented flagella and are shorter and more slender than the second antennae. Males are 7–13 mm long and females are 6–12 mm. Colours vary but are usually yellow-grey with brown, red or black patches depending on the colour of the habitat.

== Distribution ==
Jassa falcata is found on all British coasts. It has also been reported in several sites around the coast of Ireland.
