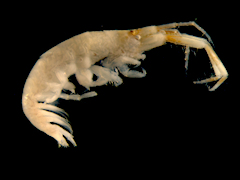
- A Siphonoecetes (Centraloecetes) kroyeranus individual

Scientific classification
- Kingdom: Animalia
- Phylum: Arthropoda
- Clade: Pancrustacea
- Class: Malacostraca
- Order: Amphipoda
- Family: Ischyroceridae
- Genus: Siphonoecetes; Krøyer, 1845

= Siphonoecetes =

Genus of amphipod crustaceans

Siphonoecetes is a genus of amphipods in the family Ischyroceridae, first described by Henrik Nikolai Krøyer in 1845 in the Karcinologiske Bidrag of the Naturhistorisk Tidsskrift. The type species is Siphonoecetes typicus Krøyer, 1845.

== Species ==
Species recognised as of October 2023 are:

- Siphonoecetes sabatieri Rouville, 1894
- Siphonoecetes smithianus Rathbun, 1905
- Siphonoecetes typicus Krøyer, 1845

Two subgenera, Siphonoecetes (Centraloecetes) Just, 1983. accepted as Centraloecetes Just, 1983 and Siphonoecetes (Orientoecetes) Just, 1983, accepted as Orientoecetes Just, 1983, were raised to genus level.
