= Ericthonius =

Scientific classification
- Domain: Eukaryota
- Kingdom: Animalia
- Phylum: Arthropoda
- Class: Malacostraca
- Order: Amphipoda
- Family: Ischyroceridae
- Genus: Ericthonius; Milne-Edwards, 1830

Genus of crustaceans

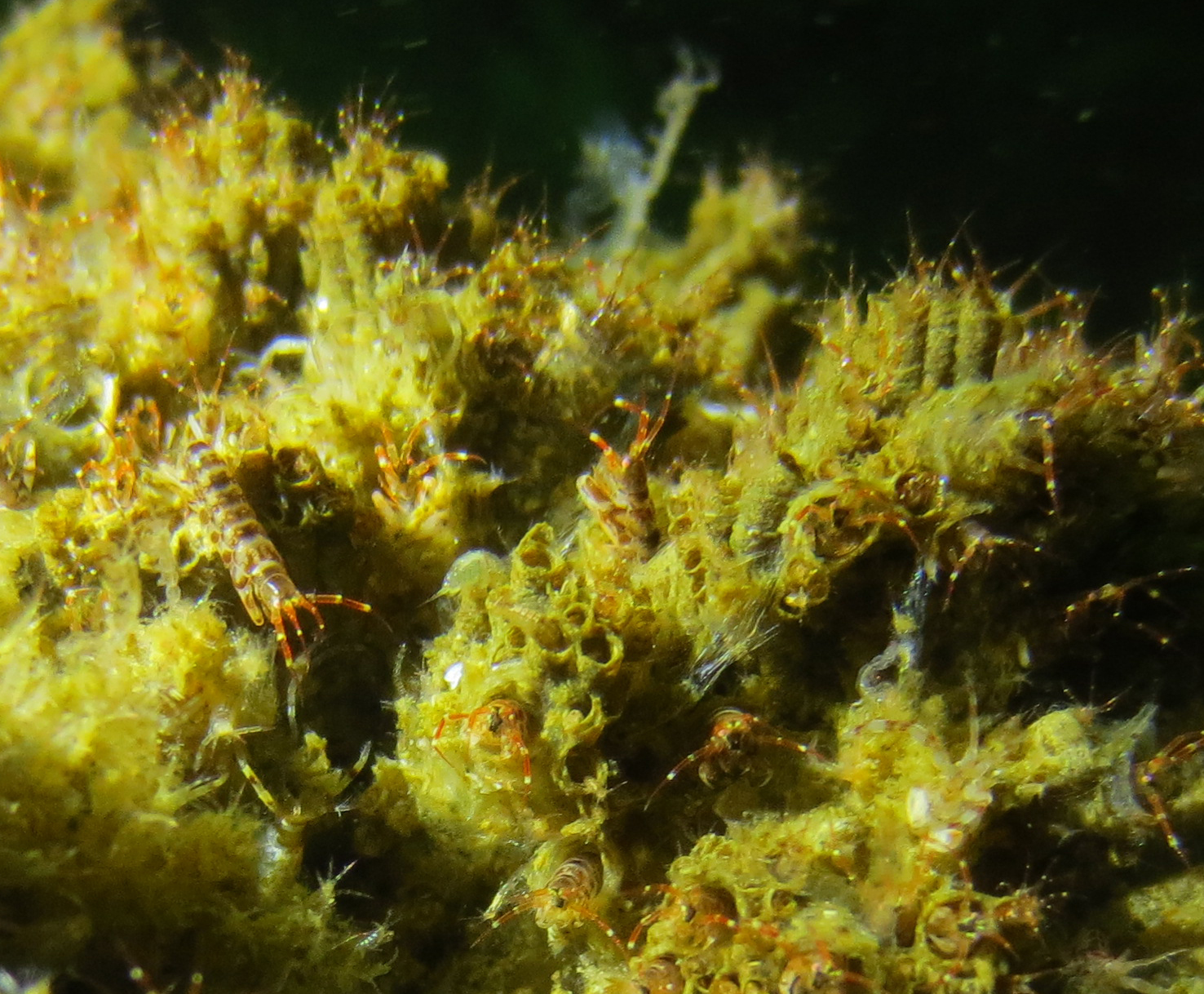
Ericthonius rubricornis.

Ericthonius is a genus of amphipods in the family Ischyroceridae. There are at least 20 described species in Ericthonius.

== Species ==
These 23 species belong to the genus Ericthonius:

- Ericthonius argenteus Krapp-Schickel, 1993^{g}
- Ericthonius brasiliensis (Dana, 1853)^{i c g}
- Ericthonius brevicarpus Vader & Myers, 1996^{g}
- Ericthonius convexus Ariyama, 2009^{g}
- Ericthonius coxacanthus Moore, 1988^{g}
- Ericthonius didymus Krapp-Schickel, 2013^{g}
- Ericthonius difformis H. Milne Edwards, 1830^{i c g}
- Ericthonius fasciatus (Stimpson, 1853)^{i c g}
- Ericthonius forbesii Hughes & Lowry, 2006^{g}
- Ericthonius grebnitzkii Gurjanova, 1951^{i c g}
- Ericthonius latimanus^{i c g}
- Ericthonius ledoyeri Barnard & Karaman, 1991^{g}
- Ericthonius macrodactylus^{i c g}
- Ericthonius megalops (G. O. Sars, 1879)^{i c g}
- Ericthonius parabrasiliensis Just, 2009^{g}
- Ericthonius pugnax^{i c g}
- Ericthonius punctatus (Bate, 1857)^{i c g}
- Ericthonius rodneyi Hughes & Lowry, 2006^{g}
- Ericthonius rubricornis (Stimpson, 1853)^{i c g b}
- Ericthonius stephenseni^{i c g}
- Ericthonius tacitus Moore, 1988^{g}
- Ericthonius tolli Brüggen, 1909^{i c g}
- Ericthonius tropicalis Just, 2009^{g}

Data sources: i = ITIS, c = Catalogue of Life, g = GBIF, b = Bugguide.net
