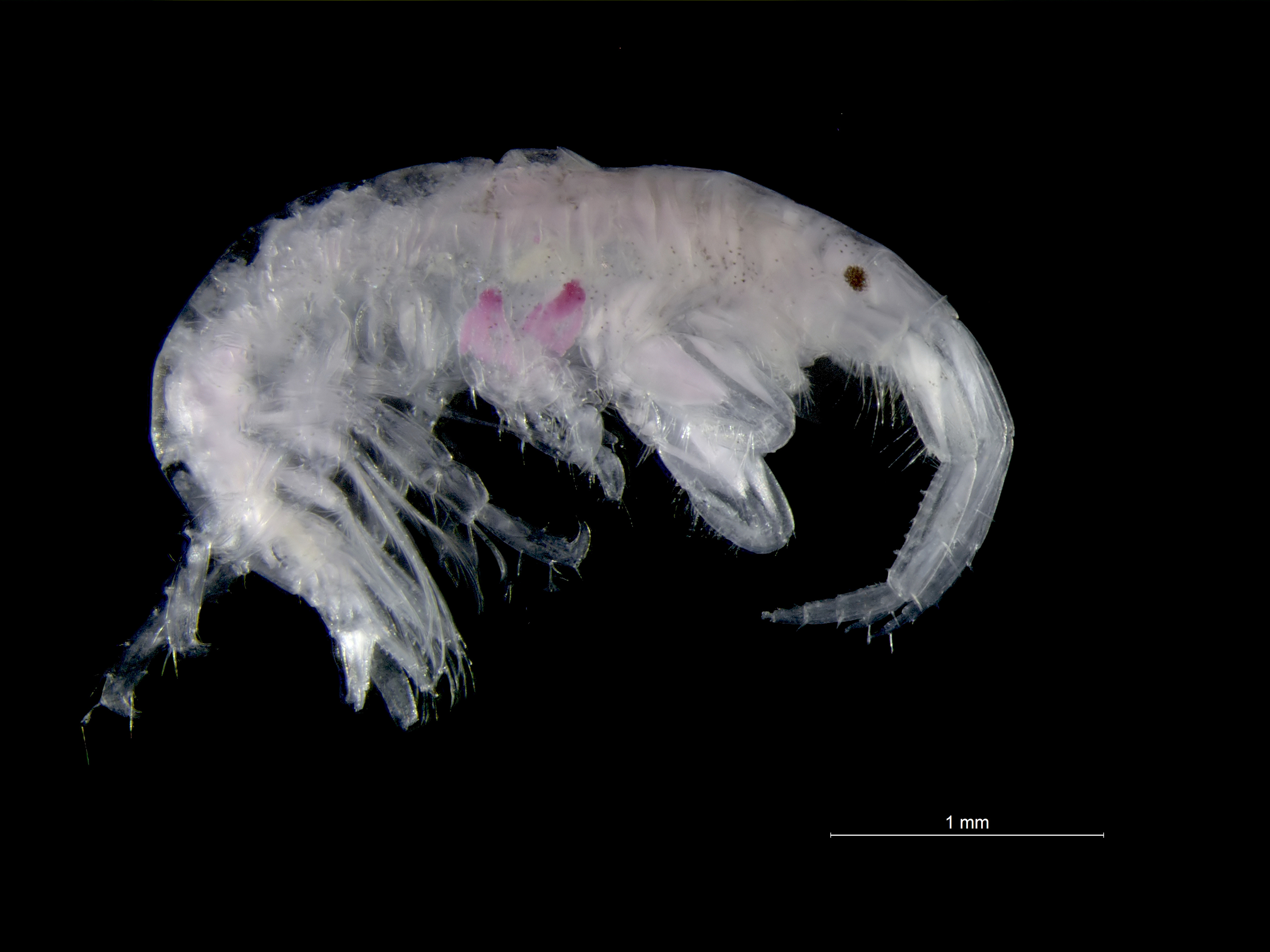
- Jassa herdmani collected from the North Sea

Scientific classification
- Kingdom: Animalia
- Phylum: Arthropoda
- Clade: Pancrustacea
- Class: Malacostraca
- Order: Amphipoda
- Family: Ischyroceridae
- Genus: Jassa; Leach, 1814

Type species
- Jassa falcata (Montagu, 1808)

= Jassa =

Genus of crustaceans

Jassa is a genus of amphipods in the family Ischyroceridae, comprising the following species:

- Jassa algensis (Nardo, 1847)
- Jassa alonsoae Conlan, 1990
- Jassa australis (Haswell, 1879)
- Jassa barnardi Stephensen, 1949
- Jassa borowskyae conlan, 1990
- Jassa cadetta Krapp, Rampin & Libertini, 2008
- Jassa calcaratus (Rathke, 1843)
- Jassa californicus (Boeck, 1871)
- Jassa carltoni Conlan, 1990
- Jassa falcata (Montagu, 1808)
- Jassa fenwicki Conlan, 1990
- Jassa goniamera Walker, 1903
- Jassa gruneri Conlan, 1990
- Jassa hartmannae Conlan, 1990
- Jassa herdmani (Walker, 1893)
- Jassa ingens (Pfeffer, 1888)
- Jassa justi Conlan, 1990
- Jassa kjetilanna Vader & Krapp, 2005
- Jassa marmorata Holmes, 1905
- Jassa marmorea
- Jassa monodon (Heller, 1867)
- Jassa morinoi Conlan, 1990
- Jassa multidentata Schellenberg, 1931
- Jassa myersi Conlan, 1990
- Jassa ocia (Bate, 1862)
- Jassa oclairi Conlan, 1990
- Jassa orientalis (Dana, 1852)
- Jassa pusilla (Sars, 1894)
- Jassa shawi Conlan, 1990
- Jassa slatteryi Conlan, 1990
- Jassa spinipes (Johnston, 1829)
- Jassa staudei Conlan, 1990
- Jassa thurstoni Conlan, 1990
- Jassa validum (Dana, 1853)
- Jassa variegatus Leach, 1814
- Jassa wandeli Chevreux, 1906
