= Thomas Crooke (priest) =

English clergyman

Thomas Crooke (c.1545–1598) was a sixteenth-century English clergyman, who was noted for his strongly Calvinist views. He was the father of several children, including the lawyer and politician Sir Thomas Crooke, 1st Baronet, founder of the town of Baltimore, County Cork, and of Helkiah Crooke, Court physician to King James I.

== Life ==
He was born at Cransley in Northamptonshire. From his will, we know that he had several siblings and that his father after his mother's death remarried a Mrs. Joyner, who was still alive in 1595. His son Thomas in his will of 1629 left a legacy to "my good old Aunt Hudson", who was probably the elder Thomas's sister; she was still alive in 1635. Sir George Croke, one of the High Court judges who heard the Case of Ship Money, is sometimes referred to as his cousin, but the exact connection between them is unclear.

He went to school in Stamford and matriculated at Trinity College, Cambridge in 1560, becoming scholar in 1562, Bachelor of Arts 1563 and Master of Arts 1566. He was ordained in 1568 in Norwich and presented to the living of Great Waldingfield, Suffolk in 1571. He graduated Doctor of Theology from Pembroke College, Cambridge in 1578.

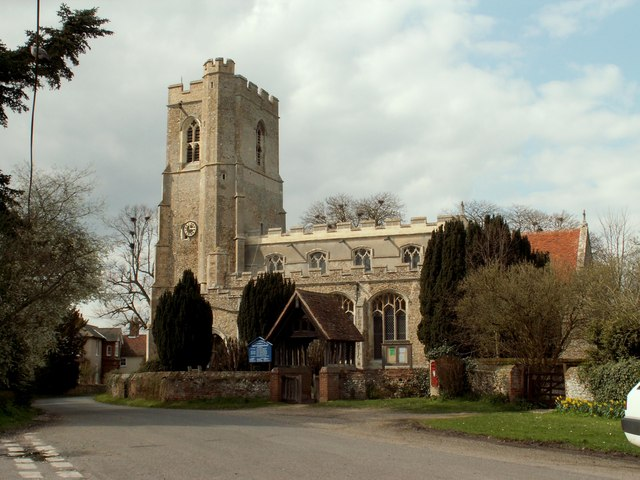
Great Waldingfield- Thomas was vicar here from 1571

From the beginning of his career, he belonged to the "godly elite", the circle of Calvinist clerics who included John Foxe, Thomas Cartwright, John Field and Thomas Wilcox, all of whom were friends of his. He was a member of the conference which first met in 1570 to press an ambitious programme of ecclesiastical reform on Parliament. Unlike some of his colleagues, he left no published works behind him, and does not seem to have played a leading part in the religious debates of the time. However his strong Calvinist views were well known to the Church authorities; possibly as a precaution against any action being taken, he obtained the position of preacher to Gray's Inn, being "specially appointed" to it in 1582. He combined this with the living of St. Mary Woolchurch. This apparently saved him from a serious clash with either John Aylmer, Bishop of London or John Whitgift, Archbishop of Canterbury; the authorities even enlisted him from time to time to engage in controversy with the Jesuits. He became reader at St Peter, Westcheap in 1597. He died in 1598 and as requested in his will (a very long and detailed one) he was buried in St. Mary Woolchurch "without superstition or vanity... since it is there that a great part of my poor labours has been bestowed for many years".

== Family ==
His wife was a Miss Samuel. In addition to Sir Thomas Crooke, they had four sons: Samuel, a preacher of some note, Helkiah Crooke, Court physician to King James I, John, and Richard. They had four daughters: Sarah, who married Stephen Egerton, another of the godly elite, Rachel, who married Henry Rosse, a London goldsmith, Anne and Elizabeth. John may have died before 1630 since Thomas' eldest son, Sir Thomas Crooke, does not mention him (unlike his three brothers) in his will; from this will we also know that Rachel (by then "much impoverished") was still alive in 1630. Sarah had died in 1624; in her will, she left to her brother Thomas her husband's ring "with a death's head", to Samuel her wedding ring, and small sums of money to her other siblings. Through Sarah's husband Stephen Egerton the Crookes had a family connection with John Winthrop, the celebrated Governor of Massachusetts Bay Colony, who married Stephen's niece Margaret Tyndal Winthrop.
