= Cransley =

Civil parish in Northamptonshire, England

Coordinates: 52.3803°N 0.7894°W

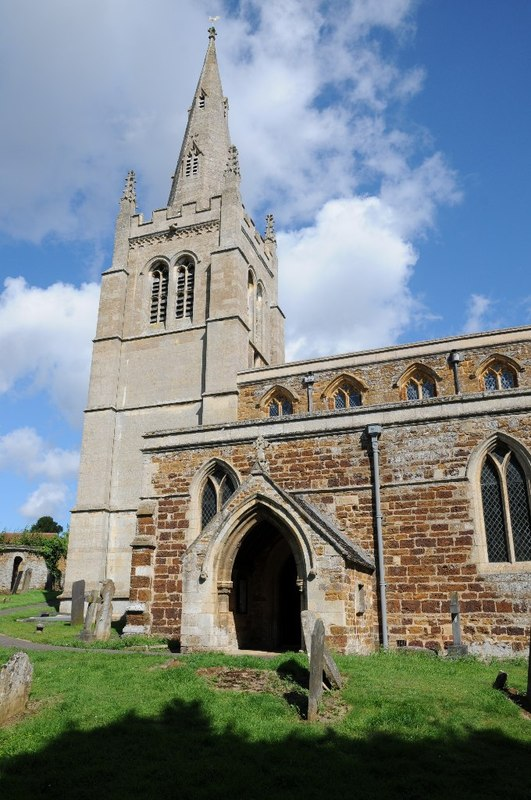
- St Andrew's Church

- Location within Northamptonshire
- Population: 305 (2011)
- OS grid reference: SP8276
- Unitary authority: North Northamptonshire
- Ceremonial county: Northamptonshire
- Region: East Midlands
- Country: England
- Sovereign state: United Kingdom
- Post town: Kettering
- Postcode district: NN14
- Dialling code: 01536
- Police: Northamptonshire
- Fire: Northamptonshire
- Ambulance: East Midlands
- UK Parliament: Kettering

Cransley is a civil parish in Northamptonshire, England. It contains the village of Great Cransley but Little Cransley is in the adjacent parish of Broughton. At the time of the 2001 census, Cransley parish had 283 inhabitants, increasing to 305 at the 2011 Census.

The villages name means 'Crane'/Herons' wood/clearing'.

Thomas Crooke, the noted sixteenth-century preacher, was a native of Cransley; he was the ancestor of the Crooke baronets of Baltimore, County Cork.
