= Ger O'Driscoll =

Ger O'Driscoll may refer to:

- Ger O'Driscoll (Gaelic footballer), Irish Gaelic footballer
- Ger O'Driscoll (hurler) (born 1987), Irish hurler
