= Great Waldingfield =

Village in Suffolk, England

Coordinates: 52.0558°N 0.77462°E

- Village and civil parish
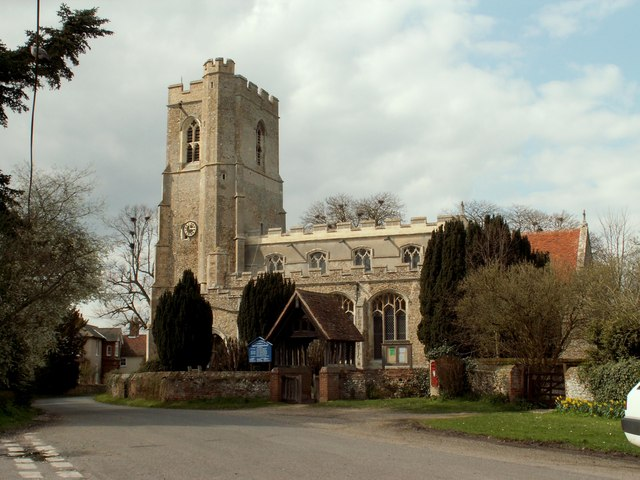
- St Lawrence's Church, Great Waldingfield

- Location within Suffolk
- Population: 1,431 (2011)
- OS grid reference: TL9043
- Civil parish: Great Waldingfield
- District: Babergh
- Shire county: Suffolk
- Region: East
- Country: England
- Sovereign state: United Kingdom
- Post town: SUDBURY
- Postcode district: CO10
- Dialling code: 01787
- Police: Suffolk
- Fire: Suffolk
- Ambulance: East of England
- UK Parliament: South Suffolk

Great Waldingfield is a village and civil parish in the Babergh district of Suffolk, England about two miles (3 km) north-east of Sudbury and two miles (3 km) south-west of its sister village, Little Waldingfield. The village is split into two separate parts; the older and smaller part around St Lawrence’s Church, and the newer and larger section along the B1115 road between Sudbury and Lavenham. Most of the houses in the newer section were built after World War II, including much council housing. The parish also includes the hamlets of Upsher Green and part of Washmere Green. The population is estimated to be 1,460, reducing to 1,431 at the 2011 Census.

The village hall was the normal location of the halfway feeding station on the Dunwich Dynamo overnight bicycle ride until 2010, whilst an episode of Lovejoy ("Fruit of the Dessert") was filmed in the village.

== History ==
The discovery of a number of artefacts suggests that the village existed during the Bronze Age and the Roman occupation of Britain, but the first record of the village's existence is from the Domesday Book of 1086, in which the village was listed as Walingafella Magna with three Saxon manors and an area of around 3,000 acres (12 km²).

Located on the major thoroughfare between the wool town of Lavenham and Sudbury, the village was well-placed to benefit from the trade boom in the late Middle Ages.

An outbreak of Bubonic plague in 1626 reduced the population by at least 10%, going from 513 in 1611 to 459 in 1631.

In 1648, during the siege of Colchester (part of the English Civil War) Cromwell's Ironsides were billeted in the village, an area which became Garrison Lane. Soldiers were stationed in the village after the war before being demobilised.

The late 19th and early 20th centuries saw a steady decline in population, caused by out-migration and a flu epidemic, from 659 in 1851 to 348 in 1931.

During World War II an airfield was built adjacent to the village. The airfield was completed in 1943 and handed over to the USAAF on 23 March 1944. For security reasons named Station 174 by the United States Army Air Force, the airfield was later more commonly known as RAF Sudbury. With three runways, the airfield was home to the 486th Bombardment Group.

== Governance ==
Great Waldingfield is part of the Suffolk County Council electoral division of Sudbury East and Waldingfield, and is represented by Philip Faircloth-Mutton (Conservative).

It is also part of the Babergh District Council electoral ward called Lavenham, and is represented by Councillors Margaret Maybury (Conservative) and Paul Clover (Conservative).

== Notable residents ==
- John Hopkins: Village rector who, together with Thomas Sternhold, produced the first national English hymn book in 1562. The book has gone through over 600 editions, and has been outsold only by the Bible and the Book of Common Prayer.
- Thomas Crooke, a leading Calvinist cleric. He also served as village rector from 1571 to 1598, and his sons, of whom three became famous, grew up in the village:
  - Sir Thomas Crooke, 1st Baronet
  - Helkiah Crooke
  - Samuel Crooke
- Neville Armstrong (1914–2008), literary agent and publisher
