= Lough Hyne =

Marine lake in West Cork, Ireland

- Loch Oighinn (Irish)
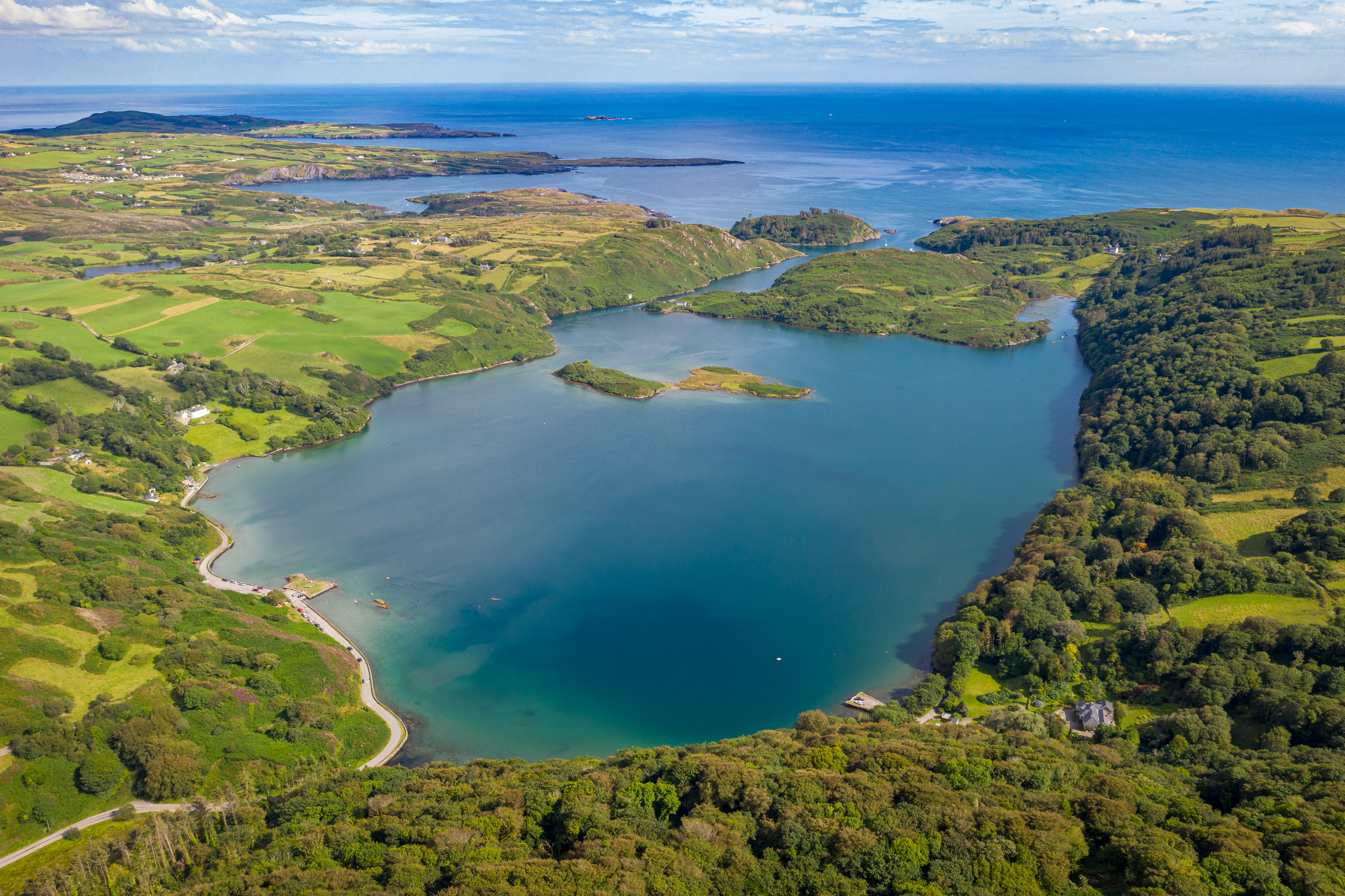
- Aerial view of Lough Hyne from July 2019

- Location within County Cork
- Location: Carbery West, County Cork
- Coordinates: 51°30′10″N 9°18′10″W
- Type: Sea lough, marine lake
- Etymology: Irish: "lake of the cauldron"
- Primary inflows: Barloge Creek, Celtic Sea
- Primary outflows: Barloge Creek, Celtic Sea
- Catchment area: 2.89 km^{2} (1.12 sq mi)
- Basin countries: Ireland
- Surface area: 0.6 km^{2} (150 acres)
- Max. depth: 50 m (160 ft)
- Residence time: 9 years
- Salinity: 34.06 ± 0.543 ‰
- Surface elevation: Sea level
- Islands: 1 (Castle Island)

Lough Hyne (/lɒx ˈhaɪn/; Irish: Loch Oighinn, meaning 'lake of the cauldron') is a fully marine sea lough in West Cork, Ireland, about 5 km southwest of Skibbereen. It was designated as Ireland's first Marine Nature Reserve in 1981.

== Features ==
Lough Hyne was probably a freshwater lake until about four millennia ago (2000 BC, during the Atlantic Bronze Age), when rising sea levels flooded it with saline ocean water. The lake is now fed by tidal currents that rush in from the Atlantic through Barloge Creek. The stretch between the creek and the lake is known as "The Rapids." The lake's small size, only 0.8 km by 0.6 km, creates an unusual habitat of highly oxygenated yet warm seawater that sustains an enormous variety of plants and animals, many of which are not found anywhere else in Ireland. A wide variety of environments such as cliffs, salt marsh, beach, and areas of greatly varying water movement add to the area's biodiversity. Some of the seawalls around the lake and the Rapids were built as relief work during the Great Famine.

Scientific investigation of the area began in 1886 when Rev. William Spottswood Green first recorded the presence of the purple sea urchin Paracentrotus lividus. Prof. Louis Renouf resumed the scientific work in 1923 and promoted it as a 'biological station' and sustained studies have been carried out there since then. It is now one of the most-studied sites of its size in the world. Several laboratories were constructed near the shores of the lake, supporting ground-breaking ecological research under Prof. Jack Kitching and Dr John Ebling. An illustrated history of the marine research was published in 2011 'Lough Hyne: The Marine Researchers - in Pictures'.

The area is a tourist attraction with a permanent exhibition on the lough and its importance at the nearby Skibbereen Heritage Centre. The ruins of Saint Bridgit's Church lie on the shores of the lake, along with the holy wells Tobarín Súl and Skour Well on the side of Knockomagh Hill. Castle Island lies in the centre of the lake, where the ruins of Cloghan Castle, once a fortress of the O'Driscoll clan, are still visible. A nature trail up Knockomagh Hill offers superb views of the lough and the surrounding area. Lough Hyne is a kayaking and swimming destination for locals and tourists in the summer.

The marine amphipod Ischyrocerus fractus is endemic to Lough Hyne, specifically along the south coast, Whirlpool cliff and the west end of Castle Island.

== See also ==
- List of loughs in Ireland

== Sources ==
- The Skibbereen Heritage Center
- The history of scientific research at Lough Hyne
- Tourist information
- The establishment of Lough Hyne as a Marine Reserve, including a map of the Reserve
- Underwater video from Lough Hyne
