= O'Driscoll =

Family name

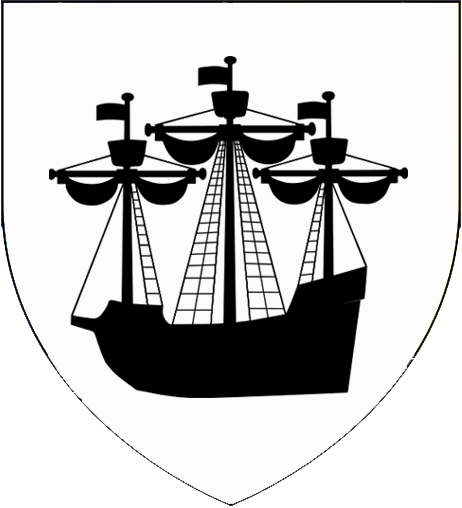
The O'Driscoll coat of arms

Ó Drisceóil, O'Driscoll (and its derivative Driscoll) is an Irish surname. It is derived from the Gaelic Ó hEidirsceoil. The O'Driscolls were rulers of the Dáirine sept of the Corcu Loígde until the early modern period; their ancestors were Kings of Munster until the rise of the Eóganachta in the 7th century. At the start of the 13th century, the prominent branches of the family came into existence: Muintear Uí Dhrisceóil Mhóir, Ó Drisceóil Óg, Sliocht Thaidhg and Ó Drisceóil Beara. The Ó prefix was illegal in Ireland during the 17th and 18th centuries. The surname is now most prominent in the Irish counties of Cork and Kerry.

== Naming conventions ==
Male	Daughter	Wife (Long)	Wife (Short)
Ó hEidirsceóil	Ní Eidirsceóil	Bean Uí Eidirsceóil	Uí Eidirsceóil
Ó Drisceóil	Ní Dhrisceóil	Bean Uí Dhrisceóil	Uí Dhrisceóil

== Overview ==
The surname derives from the forename Eidirsceol, who was alive in the early-to-mid 10th century. The Irish word itself, eidirsceol, means "go-between" or "bearer of news".

The family are of Érainn descent, specifically the Corcu Loígde population group. By the time the family began using the surname, the territory known as Corcu Loígde (roughly the same as the diocese of Ross) in south-west County Cork, was identified as their homeland, with the town of Baltimore been their seat. From the 12th century the Ó hEidirsceoil's were recorded as kings of Corcu Loígde. According to historian C. Thomas Cairney, the O'Driscolls were a chiefly family of the Corca Laoghdne. They were in turn descended from the Erainn tribe, the second wave of Celts who settled in Ireland from 500 to 100 BC.

Been driven so far south by the Gaelic Eóganachta and the Anglo-Normans, the family became expert sailors and fishermen. According to genealogist John Grenham:

From the thirteenth to the fifteenth centuries they struck an alliance with the Powers of County Waterford in their long feud with the burgesses and merchants of Waterford city, and many of their leaders were killed in battle on land and sea. The feud ended when one of the best known incidents occurred in 1413, when the Mayor of Waterford, Simon Wicken, arrived in Baltimore on Christmas Day and was invited to join in the Christmas festivities. From the fifteenth century on, the family struggled to retain lands and power taken by the English. By 1610, Baltimore had become an English port. In 1631 the town was sacked by Algerine pirates who according to the Irish poem, "Only Smiled; O'Driscolls Child", the pirates burned, raided and kidnapped their people. The poem describes a brave O'Driscoll girl who fought back against the pirates. The poem further describes that, "High on a gallows tree a yelling wretch is seen: Hackett of Dungarvan steered the Algerine". "Some mutter'd of MacMurchadh who brought the Norman O'er. Some curs'd him with Iscariot, that day in Baltimore!"

They are described by Donnchadh Ó Corráin as follows:

In general, the seafaring peoples of the south and west coast—Ua hEtersceóil, Ua Muirchertaig, Ua Conchobair Chiarraige, Ua Domnaill of Corcu Baiscind, Ua Flaithbeartaig, Ua Dubda, and others served as commanders of the king's fleets.

Though the landowners of the clan lost several castles during the 17th century war with Queen Elizabeth of England, most of those bearing the name in Ireland are still to be found living in the County Cork.

Forenames associated with the family included Finn and Con/Mac Con. From the late medieval era, they were anglicized as Florence and Cornelius.

== Annalistic references ==
U=Annals of Ulster. AI=Annals of Inisfallen.

- U944: Cairpre son of Mael Pátraic, king of Uí, Liatháin, and Finn son of Mután, king of Corcu Laígdi, were killed by the men of Mag Féine.
- AI1103: Conchobar Ua hEtersceóil, king of Corcu Laígde, died in Ros Ailithir.
- AI1103: The son of Ua hEtersceóil, king of Corcu Laígde, went to sea with a crew of twenty-five, {and unknown is their faring or their end thereafter}.
- AI1126: Ciarmac Ua hEtersceóil died.
- AI1178: Muirchertach, grandson of Domnall Ua Carthaig, was treacherously slain by Ua hEtersceóil {in Móin Cluana Cuarbáin and Hector(?)
- AI1179: The son of Finn Ua hEtersceóil was slain.
- AI1229: Donnchad Ó hEtersceóil, king of Corcu Laígde, died.

== List of people ==
- Agnes Meyer Driscoll (1889–1971), American cryptanalyst
- Alfred E. Driscoll (1902–1975), American politician from New Jersey
- Barry Driscoll (1926–2006), British painter, wildlife artist and sculptor
- Bobby Driscoll (1937–1968), American Academy Award-winning actor
- Brian Driscoll, American law enforcement officer
- Brian O'Driscoll (born 1979), Irish international rugby union player
- Bridget Driscoll (died 1896), early British automobile accident victim
- Bruce Driscoll (born 1983), Brazilian/American record producer, songwriter, guitarist, and vocalist
- Charles Benedict Driscoll (1885–1951), American journalist and editor
- Chris Driscoll (born 1971), Canadian lacrosse player
- Clara Driscoll (disambiguation), multiple people
- Dan O'Driscoll (born 1985), former drummer in The Divided, vocalist in British metal band Centuries
- Daniel A. Driscoll (1875–1955), American politician from New York
- Daniel P. Driscoll (born 1985/86), United States Secretary of the Army
- Daniel Patrick Driscoll (1862–1934), British army officer
- Danny Driscoll (1855–1888), American criminal and co-leader of the Whyos
- Dawn Driscoll (born 1978), American politician from Iowa
- Denis J. Driscoll (1871–1958), American politician from Pennsylvania
- Dennis O'Driscoll (1954–2012), Irish poet
- Denny Driscoll (1855–1886), American Major League Baseball player
- Emma O'Driscoll (born 1982), Irish television presenter
- Sir Fineen O'Driscoll (died 1629), Irish lord
- Gary Driscoll (1946–1987), American rock drummer
- Gay O'Driscoll, Dublin senior football player
- Ger O'Driscoll (disambiguation), multiple people
- Hockey Driscoll, rugby union and rugby league footballer who played in the 1890s and 1900s
- Gerry Driscol (1924–2011), American yacht racer and businessperson
- Jack Driscoll (American football) (born 1997), American football player
- Jackie O'Driscoll (1921–1988), Irish football winger
- James Driscoll (born 1977), American golfer
- Jean Driscoll (born 1966), American wheelchair racer
- Jim Driscoll (1880–1925), Welsh featherweight boxer
- Joe Driscoll (rapper) (born 1979), musician from New York
- John Driscoll (actor) (born 1981), American television and soap opera actor
- John Driscoll (Montana politician) (born 1946), American politician from Montana
- John L. Driscoll, American football coach and sports figure
- John R. Driscoll (1924–2014), American politician from Massachusetts
- John O'Driscoll (rugby union) (born 1953), Irish international rugby union player
- John O'Driscoll (Gaelic footballer) (born 1967), Irish sportsperson
- Joseph Driscoll (Canadian politician) (1876–1942), Canadian politician from Alberta
- Joseph R. Driscoll, American politician from Massachusetts
- Julie Driscoll (born 1947), English singer and actress
- Kat Driscoll (born 1986), British trampolinist
- Kermit Driscoll (born 1956), American jazz bassist
- Kim Driscoll (born 1966), American politician from Massachusetts
- Kyle Driscoll (born 1994), American baseball coach
- Logan Driscoll (born 1997), American baseball player
- Loren Driscoll (1928–2008), American tenor
- Mark Driscoll (disambiguation), multiple people
- Mark Driscoll (screenwriter) (born 1959), American screenwriter
- Martha O'Driscoll (1922–1998), American film actress from 1937 until 1947
- Matthew Driscoll (born 1958), American politician from New York
- Matthew Driscoll (basketball) (born 1964), American basketball coach
- Michael Driscoll (economist) (born 1950), British economist
- Michael Driscoll (Pennsylvania politician) (born 1960), American politician from Pennsylvania
- Michael E. Driscoll (1851–1929), American politician from New York
- Michael Patrick Driscoll (1939–2017), American Roman Catholic bishop
- Mick O'Driscoll (born 1978), Irish international rugby union player
- Paddy Driscoll (1895–1968), American professional football quarterback
- Pádraig O'Driscoll, Dublin senior hurler at Lucan Sarsfields
- Patricia Driscoll (1927–2020), Irish and British actress
- Patrick Driscoll (born 1987), Canadian musician
- Patrick O'Driscoll (1878–1949), Irish Clann na Talmhan politician
- Peter Driscoll (author) (1942–2005), British author
- Peter Driscoll (born 1954), Canadian ice hockey player
- Phil Driscoll (born 1947), American musician and minister
- Richard Driscoll (born 1980), English comic
- Robin Driscoll, British actor and writer
- Robyn Driscoll (born 1962), American politician from Montana
- Sean O'Driscoll (born 1957), English-born football manager and former player
- Shirley Driscoll (born 1935), English cricketer
- Terry Driscoll (born 1947), American basketball player
- Timothy S. Driscoll (born 1966), American judge from New York
- William Driscoll (fl. 2010s–2020s), American politician from Massachusetts
- William P. Driscoll (born 1947), American Navy flight officer

=== Fictional characters ===
- Driscoll from the video game Front Mission
- Driscoll Berci from the manga series Bleach
- Becky Driscoll from the film Invasion of the Body Snatchers (1956)
- Cody Driscoll, DC Comics character also known as Risk
- Elizabeth Driscoll from the film Invasion of the Body Snatchers (1978)
- Erin Driscoll from the television show 24
- Jack Driscoll from the King Kong franchise
- Peyton Driscoll from the television show CSI: NY
- Colm O'Driscoll and his gang, the O'Driscolls, in the video game Red Dead Redemption 2
- Driscoll Padgett from the novel Bleeding Edge
- The Driscoll Brothers (Danny and Tony), recurring characters in the sitcom Only Fools and Horses
- Mr. Driscoll, an alias Jesse Pinkman uses in El Camino

== See also ==
- Irish clans
