= Clara Driscoll =

Clara Driscoll may refer to:

- Clara Driscoll (philanthropist) (1881–1945), Texas-born businesswoman, philanthropist, and historic preservationist
- Clara Driscoll (glass designer) (1861–1944), director of the Tiffany Studios' Women's Glass Cutting Department, New York City
