= Sir Walter Coppinger =

Irish noble

Sir Walter Coppinger (died 1639) was a member of the Irish nobility from County Cork, Ireland, who was a magistrate of Cork city, a lawyer, a landlord, and a moneylender. Coppinger came from one of the most prominent families in Cork city; though himself of Hiberno-Norse rather than Old English or Gaelic descent, he was hostile to the English settlement of Cork, and had a reputation for ruthlessness.

Sir Walter Coppinger was the eldest son of James Coppinger, and the great grandson of Stephen Coppinger who was the first representative of the city of Cork in the Parliament of Ireland in 1560, and Mayor of Cork on two occasions, in 1564 and 1572. Sir Walter was a moneylender, and acquired many lands and properties from people who defaulted on mortgages. This made him somewhat unpopular and his reputation in Cork to this day reflects this.

== Land, legal disputes and incidents ==
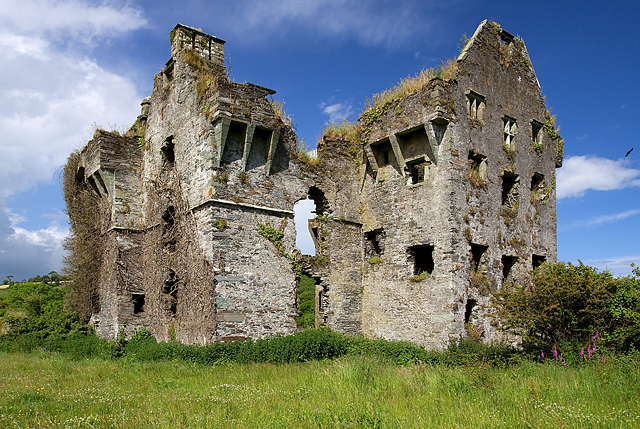
Coppingers Court

In 1594, Sir Walter acquired the rights of the manor and castle of Cloghan near Carbery, County Cork from two brothers, Charles McCormucke McTeige McCartye and Donogho McCormucke McTeige McCartye, of Cloghrean. Years later, Charles disputed the original transaction, attempted to set aside the deed and obtain a ruling whereby the original transaction was by way of a mortgage only. In 1633, the court ruled the lands and castle belonged to Sir Walter.

In 1609, the Mayor of Cork mortgaged wines which would become due to the city in order to raise money towards the payments of debts. One eighth of all prize wines, one quarter of all wines not considered as prize wines such as Spanish and Gascogne wines. This mortgage would continue until the Mayor paid £125 to repossess their estate. A number of people including Sir Walter Coppinger were granted this mortgage. In October of the same year, Sir Walter was sworn as Serjeant of the Mace.

Sir Fineen O'Driscoll was the local lord in Cork, loyal to the English, and had been knighted in 1587 for his work in capturing Spanish ships. Sir Walter's younger brother, Richard Coppinger, was married to Sir Fineen's daughter, Eileen. In 1600, Sir Fineen opened his lands to English "planters" by granting Sir Thomas Crooke the rights to found the town of Baltimore which grew rapidly. But the settlement proved deeply unpopular with the staunchly nationalist and Roman Catholic Coppinger who had his own ideas on development of West Cork. Sir Walter harassed the inhabitants with legal claims to their lands. In 1610, a compromise was reached whereby Crooke, Coppinger, and O'Driscoll agreed to grant a lease to Baltimore to the settlers for a term of 21 years, expiring on 20 June 1631.

In 1616, Crooke and his fellow settlers brought suit in the Court of Castle Chamber, the Irish equivalent of Star Chamber, alleging numerous acts of aggression against them: Coppinger was found guilty on one count of riot but cleared of the other charges. Castle Chamber was not noted for effectiveness and this verdict achieved little. In 1618, Crooke, despairing of obtaining justice from Irish courts, appealed to the Privy Council in London to protect the settlers against Coppinger's "malicious and covetous desire to supplant them" both by "bloody riot" and by fraudulent claims to their titles. No firm decision was taken, and Crooke renewed his petition before the new King Charles I in 1626, who, noting that Castle Chamber was apparently divided on the issue, ordered a hearing before Star Chamber. The case was still proceeding when Crooke died in 1630; it seems that the authorities were reluctant to decide either for Coppinger or for the settlers. After Crooke's death, control of Baltimore passed to Coppinger.

In 1618, the Barrett family mortgaged Ballincollig Castle for £240 from Edmond Coppinger. The mortgage was eventually transferred to Sir Walter and in 1630, for an additional £790, Sir Walter took possession of the castle and lands. In 1644, the castle was taken by Cromwell; after 1690 it was unused and fell into disrepair.

In 1630, Sir Walter Coppinger and two others, Sir William Sarsfield and Sir Randall Clayton, were put in the election to the office of Mayor of Cork, but all were unsuccessful.
