= Loughrea Castle =

Castle in Loughrea, County Galway, Ireland

Loughrea Castle (also known as Cloghan Castle) is a castle located in Loughrea, County Galway, Ireland. The castle was built by Richard de Burgh, Lord of Connaught in 1236. They were one of the most ancient and influential families in Irish history. The town of Loughrea was later fortified with a town wall, gates and a moat to the north, east and west, with Lough Rea as a natural defence to the south.

For centuries the castle stood abandoned, until a historically accurate restoration programme was completed in late 1996.
