= Sir Fineen O'Driscoll =

Irish clan chief (died 1629)

Sir Fineen O'Driscoll (died 1629) was an Irish clan chief who was knighted by Queen Elizabeth I. He was more commonly known as The Rover and also known as Fineen of the Ships.

O'Driscoll was married to Eileen, daughter of Sir Owen MacCarthy Reagh the 16th Prince of Carbery, whose grandmother Eleanor was a daughter of Gearóid Mór FitzGerald, 8th Earl of Kildare. His eldest son, Connor (or Conor), was the Lord of Castlehaven. His daughter Eileen married Richard Coppinger, a brother of Sir Walter Coppinger with whom he had numerous disputes over land that continued up to O'Driscoll's death. Another son Fineen was born in 1585. His daughter Mary (Irish: Máire) was captured by a pirate named Ali Krussa and sold into the Barbary slave trade. He also had an illegitimate son, Gilly Duff (or (Irish: Ghile Dubh), also known as Black Gilly Duff). Fineen was also brother-in-law to Donal II O'Donovan and the two together with Owen MacCarthy Reagh's family are all noted in collaboration on numerous occasions.

The O'Driscolls were a rich and powerful clan and their landholdings stretched over much of south Cork, from Cape Clear and the nearby islands, through Baltimore to Castlehaven. Much of their wealth was attributed to "black rent", a form of both protection money or private sector taxation paid to Clan O'Driscoll by foreign ship owners and crews who wished to use the clan's territory for both commercial fishing and the salting down of herring.

Ships who traded or fished in clan territory without paying were considered both trespassers and fair game for acts of piracy by O'Driscoll war galleys. Like other Irish and Scottish clan chiefs of the same era, however, Sir Fineen would have been honour bound to use the money gained to provide for and feed his clansmen and their families.

Sir Fineen died in 1629 in his main stronghold, An Clochán, located on an island in Loch Oighinn. His son, Donogh, succeeded as Chief of the Name, and whose descendant was the same Kate O'Driscoll known to have married the MacCarthy Reagh family of Dunmanway.
