= Baltimore, County Cork =

Village in County Cork, Ireland

Baltimore Dún na Séad
- Village
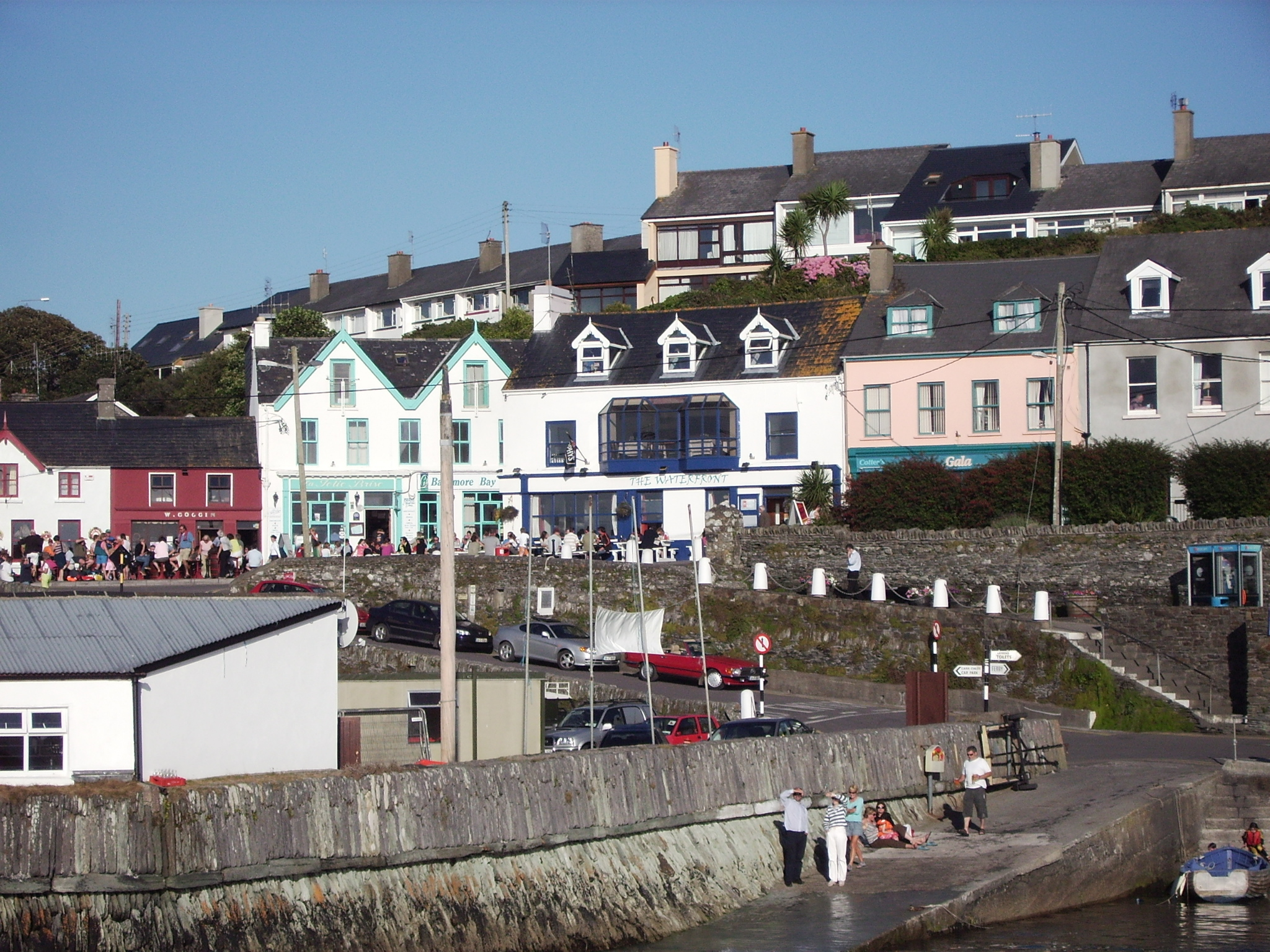
- Baltimore in 2005

- Location in Ireland
- Coordinates: 51°29′N 9°22′W
- Country: Ireland
- Province: Munster
- County: Cork
- Barony: Carbery West
- Civil parish: Tullagh
- Founded: 1607
- Elevation: 26 m (85 ft)

Population (2022)
  - Total: 414
- Eircode (Routing Key): P81
- Area code: 028
- Irish Grid Reference: W051264

Baltimore (/ˈbæltɪmɔːr/; Irish: Dún na Séad, translated as "fort of the jewels") is a village in western County Cork, Ireland. It is the main village in the parish of Rathmore and the Islands, the southernmost parish in Ireland. It is the main ferry port to Sherkin Island, Cape Clear Island and the eastern side of Roaring Water Bay (Loch Trasna) and Carbery's Hundred Isles.

Although the name Baltimore is an anglicisation of the Irish Baile an Tí Mhóir meaning "town of the big house", the Irish-language name for Baltimore is that of the O'Driscoll castle, Dún na Séad or Dunashad ("fort of the jewels"). The restored castle is open to the public and overlooks the town.

In antiquity, Dunashad was considered a sanctuary for druids and the place name is associated in Irish mythology with the feast of Bealtaine.

== History ==
Baltimore was a seat of one of Ireland's most ancient dynasties, the Corcu Loígde, former Kings of Tara and Kings of Munster. Evidence of ancient settlement in the area includes a number of ring fort, fulacht fiadh, souterrain, lime kiln and holy well sites in Baltimore townland. Dunasead Castle, also known as Baltimore Castle, was the site of a fortification from at least the early 13th century.

Baltimore is mentioned in an entry in The Genealogy of Corca Laidhe (translated by John O'Donovan in 1876) which refers to events in December 1413. According to the account, the "Mayor of the City of Waterford", Simon Wicken, together with his bailiffs and armed men, sailed to "Balintimore" on Christmas Eve. While he was invited, by the O'Driscolls of Dunasead, to join in the Christmas festivities, Wicken subsequently captured and took the O'Driscoll family back to Waterford as prisoners. Another early mention is in a pardon dated 13 December 1551 to the O'Driscolls of Ballitimore, No. 905 in the Fiants of King Edward VI.

An English Puritan colony was founded at Baltimore about 1605 by Sir Thomas Crooke, 1st Baronet, with the blessing of King James I of England; Crooke agreed to rent the land from Sir Fineen O'Driscoll, Chief of the Name of clan O'Driscoll. It was a lucrative centre of the pilchard schools and therefore of commercial fishing, and in the early 1600s a pirate base, where not only all the justices including the vice-admiral of Munster, but the entire population, were involved; all the women of Baltimore were reputed to be either the wives or mistresses of pirates. These activities were unaffected by official discouragement under King James, but English piracy generally declined shortly thereafter, partly due to competition from Barbary pirates. In 1607 Baltimore became a market town, with the right to hold a weekly market and two annual fairs. After Crooke's death, political control of the town passed to Sir Walter Coppinger.

The town was depopulated in 1631 in the Sack of Baltimore, a raid by Barbary pirates from either Ottoman Algeria or Salé (Morocco). Between 100 and 237 English settlers and local Irish people were abducted and sold into the Barbary slave trade, of whom only two or three ever saw Ireland again. Reminders of the incident still exist in the form of town pub names, such as "The Algiers". The survivors fled to Skibbereen, and the ruins of Baltimore were left almost deserted for generations. A slow recovery began in the 18th-century, and by the early 1800s the village was starting to prosper again, only to suffer further losses in the Great Famine.

Baltimore was granted borough status in 1612 with a town government consisting of a "sovereign" (Sir Thomas Crooke) and twelve burgesses. It returned two members to the Irish House of Commons from 1613 to 1801. It was disenfranchised by the Acts of Union 1800.

== Places of interest ==
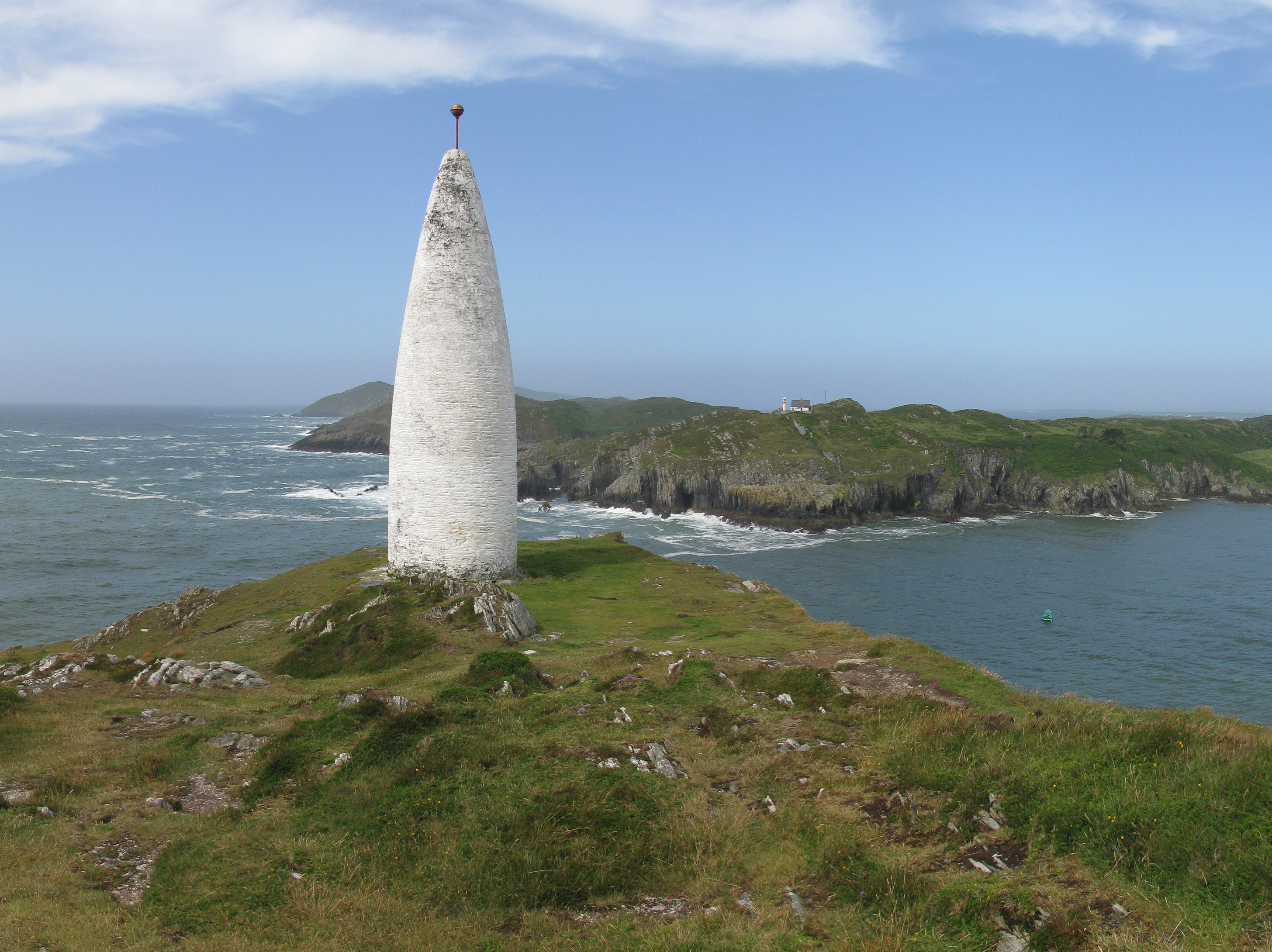
Baltimore Beacon, also known as Lot's wife

One of the most notable landmarks in the area is the Baltimore Beacon, also known as Lot's wife. Towards the end of July 1847, Commander James Wolfe, R.N., informed the Ballast Board that he had recently completed a survey of Baltimore Harbour and noticed the destruction of the beacon on the eastern point of the southern entrance to the harbour.

George Halpin, the Board's inspector was ordered to report the matter which he did the following month, stating that the original, locally built beacon was too small, poorly built, and had been vandalised. He recommended a large and properly constructed beacon with which the Board concurred.

Almost a year passed, 6 July 1848, before the Board requested the secretary to seek permission from Lord Carbery for a piece of ground ten yards in diameter, on which to build the beacon. By the end of July, a reply had been received from Mr Arthur Perry-Aylmer informing the Board that Lady Carbery of Castle Freke near Rosscarbery had given her full permission to either rebuild or re-construct the existing beacon and granted free access as the beacon was a matter of such vast importance to fishermen and others.

By February 1849 inspector George Halpin reported that the masonry work of the beacon was complete but the iron staff and vane still had to be placed on top.

The conspicuous conical white-painted Baltimore Beacon, sometimes called the 'pillar of salt' or 'Lot's wife' is approximately 50 feet (15.2m) high and 5 yards (4.6m) in diameter at the base. The vane, mentioned by Halpin in 1849 was obviously vulnerable and at a later date was replaced by a sphere.

== Tourism ==
Baltimore attracts visitors and the resident population increases in the summer months due to the summer homes that have been built in the area. Baltimore is used by visitors interested in sailing, fishing and exploring the countryside. Baltimore is a base from which tourists explore Cape Clear, Sherkin and Lough Hyne. Lough Hyne, Ireland's first marine nature reserve is approximately 5 km from the town. Baltimore also has become a venue for scuba diving, due largely to the number and variety of shipwrecks in the bay. These include a Second World War submarine (U-260), the bulk carrier Kowloon Bridge and the Alondra from 1916.

One local restaurant has two Michelin stars (Dede), as did Mews (2018–20).

== Sport ==
The local GAA club is Ilen Rovers, which was formed in 1973 and consists of the surrounding parish and that of Lisheen and Kilcoe. They compete in the Cork County Senior Football Championship and appeared in the Senior final in 2007 losing to Nemo Rangers. The local soccer team Baltimore FC also known as the Crabs were established in 2006. They won division 2 in 2010 and again in 2025 and are currently a division 1 side in the West Cork League. Sailing is also a popular activity in Baltimore. Courses are held in the summer months for both adults and children.

== Transport ==
Ferries sail from Baltimore to Schull further along the coast, to Sherkin Island, and to the more remote Cape Clear Island.

Baltimore is located on the R595 road, leading to the N71 road for Cork, roughly 100 kilometres from the village. The closest town to Baltimore is Skibbereen, 13.4 kilometres northeast of the village. Bus services to Skibbereen and Cork are provided by Bus Éireann. The nearest airport is Cork Airport

Baltimore railway station on the West Cork Railway opened on 2 May 1893, but finally closed on 1 April 1961.

== See also ==
- List of towns and villages in Ireland
- Baltimore (Parliament of Ireland constituency) (to 1800)
- List of RNLI stations
- Heir Island
