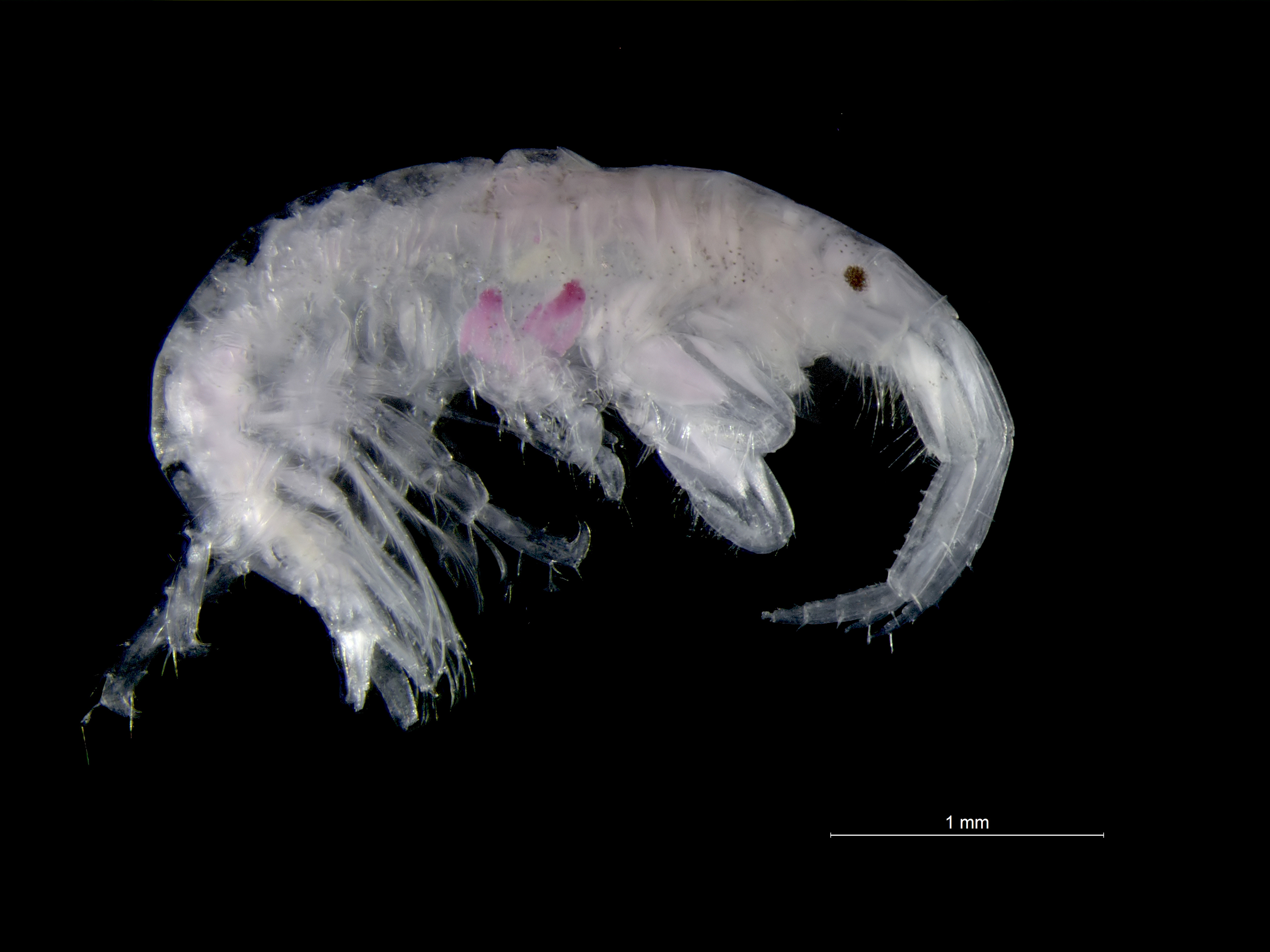
- Jassa herdmani

Scientific classification
- Kingdom: Animalia
- Phylum: Arthropoda
- Clade: Pancrustacea
- Class: Malacostraca
- Order: Amphipoda
- Suborder: Senticaudata
- Infraorder: Corophiida
- Parvorder: Caprellidira
- Superfamily: Photoidea
- Family: Ischyroceridae; Stebbing, 1899

Genera
- See text

= Ischyroceridae =

Family of crustaceans

Ischyroceridae is a family of amphipods. It contains the following genera:

- Ambicholestes Just, 1998
- Bonnierella Chevreux, 1900
- Cerapus Say, 1817
- Ericthonius Milne-Edwards, 1830
- Ischyrocerus Krøyer, 1838
- Jassa Leach, 1814
- Microjassa Stebbing, 1899
- Neoischyrocerus Conlan, 1995
- Parajassa Stebbing, 1899
- Siphonoecetes Krøyer, 1845
- Ventojassa J. L. Barnard, 1970
