= 24 Hours in A&E =

British medical television series

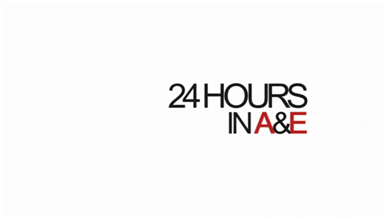
- Titlecard used from 2011–14
- Genre: Medical; Factual
- Narrated by: Anthony Philipson
- Composer: Richard Spiller
- Country of origin: United Kingdom
- Original language: English
- No. of seasons: 35
- No. of episodes: 348 (326 regular ones + 22 specials)

Production
- Producer: Spencer Kelly
- Production locations: King's College Hospital (2011–14); St George's Hospital (2014–2022); Queen's Medical Centre (2023–present)
- Running time: 47 minutes (60 when including adverts)
- Production company: The Garden

Original release
- Network: Channel 4
- Release: 11 May 2011 – present

Related
- 24 Hours in Police Custody

24 Hours in A&E is a British factual medical documentary programme, airing on Channel 4, set in a teaching hospital in inner London. Initially it was filmed in King's College Hospital in Denmark Hill, Camberwell, but in the seventh series, the setting was changed to St George's Hospital in Tooting, Wandsworth. For season 30 the setting changed again, this time moving out of London to Queens Medical Centre in Nottingham. Cameras film round the clock for 28 days, 24 hours a day in A&E (Accident and Emergency). It offers unprecedented access to one of Britain's busiest A&E departments.

== Overview ==
24 Hours in A&E gives viewers behind the scenes access to King's College Hospital in Camberwell and St George's Hospital Accident & Emergency Department, in Tooting, SW London. In season 30, the series relocated to Queen's Medical Centre in Nottingham. Series one aired every Wednesday at 21:00 and consisted of 14 one-hour episodes. The filming took place over 28 days using 70 fixed cameras and is the largest documentary series Channel 4 has ever made.

The series enables viewers to see the challenges that A&E staff face as they treat the patients that come through the doors every day.

The episodes show how the staff work as a team to treat those patients present involved in a full range of minor and serious conditions, both medical (suspected heart attack, aortic abdominal aneurysm, stroke) and trauma (from household accidents to road traffic collisions). The fly-on-the-wall footage is intercut with subsequent interviews with staff, patients and relatives giving their perspectives and background on the events shown.

Filming for the second series ended in March 2012. It began broadcasting on 16 May 2012, again appearing in the Wednesday 21:00 slot. The seventh series was filmed in St George's Hospital, Tooting. The first episode of this series was broadcast on 30 October 2014 at 21:00.

== Episodes ==
=== Series overview ===
Series	Episodes	Originally released	
Series	Episodes	First released	Last released
1	14	11 May 2011	10 August 2011
2	14	16 May 2012	15 August 2012
3	21	10 April 2013	28 August 2013
4	6	13 November 2013	18 December 2013
5	8	8 January 2014	26 February 2014
6	7	7 May 2014	16 June 2014
7	8	30 October 2014	18 December 2014
8	13	7 January 2015	1 April 2015
9	8	27 May 2015	15 July 2015
10	24	20 October 2015	13 April 2016
11	11	16 May 2016	27 July 2016
12	21	16 November 2016	10 April 2017
13	12	31 May 2017	30 August 2017
14	9	2 January 2018	27 February 2018
15	18	16 May 2018	12 September 2018
16	6	12 November 2018	17 December 2018
17	8	8 January 2019	26 February 2019
18	16	7 May 2019	20 August 2019
19	5	18 November 2019	16 December 2019
20	10	14 January 2020	16 March 2020
21	4	16 June 2020	7 July 2020
22	6	2 September 2020	7 October 2020
23	8	12 January 2021	2 March 2021
24	10	31 May 2021	2 August 2021
25	3	2 December 2021	14 December 2021
26	8	18 January 2022	15 March 2022
27	6	11 July 2022	15 August 2022
28	3	5 September 2022	19 September 2022
29	3	3 October 2022	17 October 2022
30	7	3 January 2023	14 February 2023
31	4	10 July 2023	31 July 2023
Specials	22	5 June 2013	present

=== Series 1 (2011) ===
No.	Title	Original release date	UK viewers (millions)
1	"Episode 1"	11 May 2011	2.70
This episode includes a 33-year-old Greek student who was dragged under a bus while crossing the road, a 78-year-old man who fell head-first off a ladder while painting his daughter's landing and a confused cyclist with a severe head injury.
2	"Episode 2"	18 May 2011	2.41
This episode includes 31-year-old Brendan, who has had a head-on collision between his motorbike and a car, a teenager with injuries after punching a wall and the team struggling to revive two patients in their eighties.
3	"Episode 3"	25 May 2011	2.64
This episode includes an 11-year-old, critically injured after being hit by a van and the arrival of three trauma patients in quick succession: one shot in the face, another stabbed in the chest, and the third knifed in the head.
4	"Episode 4"	1 June 2011	2.24
This episode focuses on the consequences of alcohol on A&E departments. It includes a 39-year-old who has fallen and broken his neck after a few drinks, 56-year-old David, a long-term alcoholic who collapsed in the street and hit his head and a 26-year-old who has been arrested after a day of heavy drinking, sent to King's as he cut his hand putting it through a window.
5	"Episode 5"	8 June 2011	2.54
This episode reveals what can happen when something goes wrong with the brain. Including 65-year-old Charlie, who has not been the same since crashing his cab two days ago and 89-year-old Peggy, who was rushed in with a suspected stroke.
6	"Episode 6"	15 June 2011	2.65
This episode includes 35-year-old Colin, who was stabbed after being woken at gunpoint, 86-year-old Nancy, who has fallen over at home and former lawyer Robert, who collapsed in the street drunk. He has lost his family and home after years of alcoholism.
7	"Episode 7"	22 June 2011	2.82
This episode focuses on the stabbings dealt with by King's College Hospital. It includes 17-year-old Levi, who was stabbed after a fight in the street, and two other young men from different areas, with stab wounds. Also, a young woman, punched in the face, turns up at King's, as well as a man who has had too much to drink at the House of Commons.
8	"Episode 8"	29 June 2011	2.80
This episode includes 77-year-old John, who's been sent to King's after a routine health screening revealed a potentially deadly 'Triple A' (abdominal aortic aneurism) - a dramatic swelling of the main artery that could burst at any moment.
9	"Episode 9"	6 July 2011	2.84
The medical team faces a range of sport and drink-related injuries on a busy Saturday. But the evening takes a dramatic turn when a father and son are rushed into A&E with life-threatening injuries after being attacked by gate-crashers at a family birthday party. Also, two 19-year-old girls are waiting for treatment after falling when the bar they were dancing on collapsed, while bricklayer Colin has been badly cut by someone trying to mug him.
10	"Episode 10"	13 July 2011	2.60
In an episode focused on accidents, construction worker William has been trapped under a cherry picker, breaking his leg in three places and crushing his chest, Nick has fallen from a ten-metre ladder onto concrete, landing on his head, resulting in a severe brain injury and Darren has fallen through a window while trying to clean it, cutting his arm badly.
11	"Episode 11"	20 July 2011	3.12
This episode includes 78-year-old Reginald, rushed to hospital after severe stomach pains; doctors suspect that part of his gut may have died, leaving him in a life-threatening situation. Other patients include Richard, who has twisted his knee moon-walking in a club, and a young cyclist brought in unconscious after coming off his bike.
12	"Episode 12"	27 July 2011	3.02
88-year-old Omar is brought in with severe stomach pains and a suspected abdominal aortic aneurism, 33-year-old Hanny is rushed in after attempting to take his life with a lethal cocktail of drugs and staff fight to save an 18-year-old who's been stabbed in a street fight. This episode also looks at the effects of working at King's on some of the non-medical staff.
13	"Episode 13"	3 August 2011	3.10
This episode includes 74-year-old Ted, on his 10th visit to A&E this year after being diagnosed with terminal bladder cancer, German doctor Roman, who is still getting used to the cultural differences between practising in Germany and the UK and a 40-year-old man who's been kicked in the face during a football match needs stitches.
14	"Episode 14"	10 August 2011	2.84
Focusing on mental health issues, this episode includes a regular patient to King's who has schizophrenia, admitted after failing to take his diabetes medicine and a young girl seeks refuge with the mental health team. Also visiting King's are 16-year-old Joseph and 61-year-old Clive, both suspected of having a stroke.

=== Series 2 (2012) ===
No.	Title	Original release date	UK viewers (millions)
1	"Rush Hour"	16 May 2012	2.73
The episode begins during the morning rush hour, featuring patients injured during their commutes, including two cyclists with serious head injuries. Also in A&E are Kevin, who fell from scaffolding whilst repairing a roof and 80-year-old Bill, who has hurt his knee while drinking at his local working men's club. Katalin recounts thoughts about being an actress before qualifying as a doctor.
2	"Young Ones"	23 May 2012	2.34
This episode follows some of the children admitted to King's A&E, including 16-year-old Ellie, who's been airlifted to King's after she was thrown from her horse and crushed against a fence and four-year-old Destiny, who has a fishbone stuck in his tonsils from his dinner-time curry. One of King's newest recruits, Matt, is also affected by the deaths of two older patients.
3	"Code Red"	30 May 2012	2.63
This episode includes 49-year-old Trudy, who arrives unconscious by HEMS having fallen down some stairs after a night out celebrating, Bea, who has cancer and now a suspected heart attack and Vincent, who was admitted with chest pains.
4	"Allergic to Pain"	6 June 2012	2.16
This episode explores the different ways that grown men deal with pain and injury. 50-year-old Jim arrives in A&E screaming in agony after dislocating his shoulder, 30-year-old Temi is in minors with a broken toe and 83-year-old James has a cyst on his knee but is in so much pain that he's refusing treatment.
5	"Vital Organs"	13 June 2012	2.89
This episode focuses on younger people in their 'prime'. 19-year-old Josh is flown to King's College Hospital by air ambulance having been crushed between a barge and a bridge, in minors, best friends Liam and Nicola are recovering from a Sunday night out clubbing and 80-year-old Jean has been brought to King's by ambulance after collapsing at home.
6	"One Moment in Time"	20 June 2012	2.99
Follows the work of King's A&E on the night Whitney Houston died. 21-year-old Danielle collapsed after an exercise class and Registrar Swetha is concerned that Danielle's kidneys may be failing, and that she may even be at risk of cardiac arrest. Meanwhile a boy who has fallen head-first from a 20-foot balcony arrives in resus and 34-year-old Latoya who was out partying with friends when the straps on her platform heels gave way and she fell over.
7	"A Good Life"	27 June 2012	2.50
A 93-year-old man is brought in with life-threatening injuries after being knocked down by a hit-and-run driver just outside the hospital. He goes into cardiac arrest, and a consultant must keep his heart going manually in a bid to save his life. Meanwhile, an 83-year-old's finger is mangled by a machine at his metal-working business, and a 51-year-old man with learning difficulties is treated after collapsing, prompting his elderly mother to wonder how he will cope after her death.
8	"Saturday Night"	4 July 2012	2.78
Consultant Emer Sutherland helps treat an eight-year-old who has fallen 8ft onto concrete while riding his BMX, losing his front teeth and possibly injuring his head and spine. A 19-year-old motorcyclist who hit a bollard requires urgent treatment on his leg, which may otherwise need to be amputated, and X-rays of a stabbing victim yield startling results.
9	"Mum"	11 July 2012	2.58
A woman with a weak immune system owing to the radiotherapy she underwent for breast cancer is bitten by her cat, a minor injury that could cause her serious problems. A 71-year-old with terminal cancer is brought in with breathing difficulties and a decision must be made about whether to resuscitate her if her condition worsens. Meanwhile, a 12-year-old translates for his Brazilian grandmother and a five-year-old has her head wound stitched.
10	"We Are Family"	18 July 2012	3.23
New staff nurse Sophie attends to 22-year-old chef James, who accidentally stabbed himself in the leg while chopping tomatoes. During an eventful shift, she also uses chest compressions to keep alive another patient and helps 54-year-old Bernard, who was out cold for 10 minutes after falling and banging his head against a car. However, when his family arrives, it turns out he had been drinking.
11	"Snow"	25 July 2012	2.71
Five-year-old Daisy is rushed in with severe burns after her skirt got caught in a gas fire. As paediatric sister Jen tries to ease the girl's distress, her father Damien also has treatment, having put out the flames with his bare hands. Seventy-four-year-old Maurice is brought in after hurting his hand in a fall, but his short-term memory is failing him, while 61-year-old Ginger is surprised to learn she may have to stay overnight after being scratched by her pet cat
12	"The "Q" Word"	1 August 2012	2.72
As the episode begins, there are few patients in A&E and the first call of the night on the red emergency telephone is a wrong number. But staff know that quiet ("The Q word") rarely lasts long. Consultant Jacqui must act fast when severely underweight baby Jaziah is rushed into resus with breathing difficulties. In paediatric A&E, it is hoped that 18-month-old Charlie's urine test results will explain why he has been feeling unwell for five days, while 81-year-old Ronald prepares for a CT scan after having a suspected stroke that is affecting his speech.
13	"Cause Unknown"	8 August 2012	2.69
A nine-year-old girl is rushed into resus with memory problems after slumping over her desk at school. Consultant Liz has difficulty making a diagnosis, suspecting the pupil may have a viral infection that causes a swelling of the brain. A woman with a history of anxiety attacks requires a scan after being brought in for numbness down her left side, and an 11-year-old boy is treated for a broken leg after being knocked down by a car.
14	"Life's Little Hiccups"	15 August 2012	2.61
A busy night shift sees a series of men admitted with various problems. Father-of-six Stacey is experiencing breathing difficulties, but his demanding attitude appears to mask a vulnerability. Twenty-year-old Sam is brought in after being attacked outside a nightclub and has possible injuries to the neck and spine. He is nervous because his father died at the hospital and, with a broken nose, is worried he may have lost his looks. Henry has an electrician's exam the following morning but has been hiccuping for three days. Registrar Faheem is determined to diagnose the problem and get him well in time.

=== Series 3 (2013) ===
No.	Title	Original release date	UK viewers (millions)
1	"Brief Encounter"	10 April 2013	3.11
A doctor is shocked when a young woman arrives in resus with life-threatening swelling on her brain following a random attack by a stranger on the streets, while a mother faces an agonising wait as tests are carried out on her 12-year-old son, who was hit by a car and airlifted to King's by emergency medics. A 90-year-old former circus performer is also in A&E after collapsing at home, and news of his colourful past quickly circulates among the staff.
2	"Three Sisters"	17 April 2013	3.22
Eighty-year-old Rose has fluid on her lungs and is having trouble breathing. Her daughters Christine, Sandra and Debbie put on brave faces around her bedside, convincing her that everything will be all right, but in the relatives' room there's high emotion as they contemplate life without their mother. Also in resus at King's College Hospital is Kevin, a 55-year-old trucker who has sustained injuries in a road accident.
3	"Reality Check"	24 April 2013	2.73
A 39-year-old man is flown to King's College Hospital after being involved in a head-on collision while driving a friend's sports car, and doctors fear his injuries could leave him paralysed. Meanwhile, 21-year-old Thomassine requires treatment following a skateboarding accident and the staff see to Matias, 34, who has been dragged along a station platform by a moving train.
4	"Valentine's Day"	1 May 2013	2.40
The staff at King's College Hospital treat patients on Valentine's Day, including a 53-year-old psychologist who has injured his shoulder in a motorcycle accident. His partner is abroad and he doesn't want to worry her, so he decides to keep the incident a secret. Also in the A&E department are a man with a bleed on the brain and an elderly widower who has been bitten by his dog.
5	"Second Chance"	8 May 2013	2.41
Doctors assess the injuries of 47-year-old Chrissie, who was hit by a motorcycle as she crossed the road, but her husband Tim is caught in the traffic jam her accident has caused, leaving him struggling to get to the hospital. John is in resus in a confused state following a suspected stroke, and Benedict, who is 22, has come into King's because of his drinking problem.
6	"Head First"	15 May 2013	2.67
Eight-year-old Abby has had an accident at a diving pool and needs to have her head and neck scanned for serious injuries. Worried mum Nikki puts on a brave face while doctors perform tests, but dad Scott is stuck hundreds of miles away in Scotland. Meanwhile, Anne and Holton - part of a security team dealing with more than 50 incidents a month - encounter a variety of challenging patients on the night shift at King's College Hospital in London.
7	"Walk Like a Man"	22 May 2013	2.26
Patients arriving at King's College Hospital in London include 26-year-old Nicholas, whose jaw has been dislocated in an unprovoked attack, and Tyrell, 17, who needs to have a blackened toenail removed following a football injury. Meanwhile, Ho has brought his grandmother Amoui to the ward after finding her collapsed in her flat.
8	"No Regrets"	29 May 2013	2.70
Single father Gary, 47, is put in a medically induced coma at King's College Hospital to reduce the risk of brain damage following a serious motorcycle accident, and 69-year-old Steve confronts his fear of needles when a nurse has to remove a fishbone stuck in his finger. Meanwhile, 58-year-old lung cancer patient Terry is in A&E with his carer Sandy, a year after being given two weeks to live.
9	"Live & Let Live"	4 June 2013	2.49
Scaffolder Thomas arrives at King's College Hospital after suffering a head injury at a building site and doctors are concerned he may have fractured his skull, back or neck. Hilton, 85, has diabetes and is worried about his swollen legs, and retired architect Edgar is struggling to breathe following an asthma attack. Meanwhile, in the waiting room, two women make friends and swap stories and jokes.
10	"Love & Pain"	12 June 2013	2.35
The staff of King's College Hospital reflect on the different ways in which people deal with physical and emotional pain as they treat a new batch of patients. Ahmed, 28, dislocated his shoulder during a game of American football and grits his teeth as a doctor slots it back into place. Meanwhile, 24-year-old Lee is living with Behçet's disease, a condition that affects his nervous system and causes pain so severe he passes out, and father-of-four Simon, 30, has been found unconscious at the bottom of a stairwell and it emerges he hasn't eaten for days following a relationship break-up.
11	"Duty of Care"	19 June 2013	2.28
War veteran Douglas, 94, is brought into King's College Hospital with breathing difficulties by his youngest daughter and full-time carer Sylvie, while 97-year-old Hector's airway is at risk of collapsing and his blood pressure is dangerously high. The programme also meets 69-year-old Steve, who had to give up his job as a plumber four years ago following a road accident. He's on the ward seeking treatment for a fractured shoulder after falling off a chair.
12	"For Better or Worse"	26 June 2013	2.35
Senior nurse Scott deals with a very busy shift in resus, where every bed is occupied and patients continue to arrive, including 56-year-old Pauline, who has hit her head in an accident at home. Aerial fitter David, 62, has life-threatening injuries after falling 30ft from a roof, while opera critic John is in minors with a bad ankle, and 78-year-old former window cleaner Alfred talks about coming to terms with his wife's death.
13	"Mothers & Sons"	3 July 2013	2.30
Sarah, 35, arrives at King's College Hospital concerned that a brain tumour she first had as a teenager has returned. Helen, 47, is worried about her baby son James, who was born with a hole in his heart and one kidney, and has been vomiting since the morning, while 28-year-old Wayne seeks treatment for knife wounds to his leg after he tried to stop someone stealing his girlfriend's phone.
14	"Under the Influence"	10 July 2013	2.29
Tree surgeon Kevin, 57, arrives at King's College Hospital in London with breathing difficulties, having fallen off a ladder onto a metal bar, while 11-year-old Archie has cut his lip in an accident at school and is worried about stitches. Elsewhere, a drink-related fall has left 53-year-old John with a head injury, and barman Ross, 31, needs treatment for a fractured eye socket following an alcohol-fuelled night out.
15	"A Few Good Men"	17 July 2013	2.55
Staff nurse Graeme is attacked by a prisoner who has been brought to King's College Hospital for treatment and the team has to restrain the patient before giving him the care he needs. Father-of-two Tony, 59, is rushed in by helicopter medics following a head-on traffic collision, 85-year-old Eric arrives with ongoing stomach problems and 79-year-old Jim, who is experiencing breathing difficulties, quickly strikes up a rapport with the female staff and muses on what it means to be a gentleman.
16	"Grin and Bear It"	24 July 2013	2.17
Motorcyclist Richard, 23, is rushed into A&E by helicopter after crashing into a parked car and newly promoted consultant Fleur sends him off for scans, with his dad Ian racing to the hospital to check on his son's condition. Bar worker Bobby, 22, stood barefoot on a broken wine bottle and his best friend Sophie provides moral support and distracts him while junior doctor Ed stitches his wound. Meanwhile, 75-year-old Sarah has fallen and fractured her wrist, but deals with the pain stoically in the company of her daughter Lorraine and son Kieron.
17	"Tough Love"	31 July 2013	2.24
A young man who has had a severe reaction to a recreational drug is wheeled into Resus by paramedics, and senior sister Jen and the medical team face a challenge to calm their patient down so they can treat him. A 65-year-old woman is brought in by her best friends after hitting her head when she fell off a chair while playing bingo, and a 31-year-old man with multiple sclerosis is rushed in after developing a fever at home.
18	"Twilight"	7 August 2013	2.30
Graham, a 75-year-old with schizophrenia, is brought to King's College Hospital after being stabbed in the neck by a stranger on his doorstep, and needs a CT scan to reveal the extent of his wound. Former nursery nurse Pat, 89, also arrives on the ward, having been found at the bottom of the stairs at home with no recollection of how she got there, while palliative care nurse Tracey treats 72-year-old retired postman Michael, who was recently diagnosed with lung cancer.
19	"Night Shift"	14 August 2013	2.10
On a busy Saturday night at King's College Hospital, staff have to juggle the needs of elderly patients and sick children alongside those who are drunk or violent. Paramedics bring 12-year-old Grace into resus after she falls down a flight of stairs, while Sarah and Andy are concerned for their 10-month-old son Dexter, who has a high temperature and is unresponsive. Elsewhere, clinical site manager Gordon has a series of tests as a result of senior sister Jen noticing his bloodshot eye.
20	"Life Blood"	21 August 2013	2.51
The staff of King's College Hospital treat patients involved in traffic accidents. Jade from Kent is brought in after being hit by a car and dragged under a bus on her way to school, and doctors are concerned the 12-year-old may have fractured her skull. Meanwhile, Geraldine, 60, has been injured while trying to cross the road, and after recently being released from prison 40-year-old Brian is in minors with a broken ankle, but the swelling means his electronic curfew tag will have to be removed.
21	"Worst Case Scenario"	28 August 2013	2.29
79-year-old Arthur, who has been brought into resus with acute stomach discomfort and has several underlying conditions that could be to blame. Meanwhile, 20-year-old wine merchant Tom is rushed into A&E after collapsing with sharp chest pains and breathing difficulties, and retired soldier Rockey is concerned about his blurred vision.

=== Series 4 (2013) ===
No.	Title	Original release date	UK viewers (millions)
1	"Life in the Fast Lane"	13 November 2013	2.44
The staff treat patients involved in serious road accidents, including 48-year-old retired soldier Steve, who was found unconscious at the wheel, 11-year-old schoolgirl Scarlett, who has been knocked down by a car, and Pauline, 70, who was hit by a vehicle that mounted the pavement, seriously injuring her lower legs.
2	"Love Hurts"	20 November 2013	1.97
Young parents Nicole and Stefian arrive in resus with their 19-month-old daughter Xah'Nae, who is unresponsive and has a high fever, and doctors fear she may have a life-threatening infection. Meanwhile, the team suspects 61-year-old Christine has had a second stroke in 10 years, and 52-year-old Graham, who has Down's syndrome, is brought into A&E by his sisters following an accident.
3	"One Day at a Time"	27 November 2013	1.64
Bill, 92, arrives at King's with breathing difficulties and a swollen leg and test results suggest there may be something seriously wrong, while 25-year-old Sarah is finding it hard to stand up and has been brought in by her mum and grandfather. She has learning difficulties as a result of an inherited genetic disorder and doctors are concerned she may have had a stroke.
4	"Remember Me"	4 December 2013	1.63
Peggy, 85, arrives at the hospital by ambulance, having injured her knee at home. It's the second time she has fallen in two months and medics want to find out if there's a more serious underlying cause. Meanwhile, the team keeps a close eye on 75-year-old Bob, who has had a suspected heart attack, and Ben, 25, isn't overly concerned by his swollen finger, until a doctor diagnoses cellulitis.
5	"Mum's The word"	11 December 2013	2.42
Schoolboy Eddie, 12, is brought into A&E having been hit by a car on his way home from school, and doctors are concerned he may have had a bleed on the brain, as well as damage to his kidneys. Meanwhile, 64-year-old Linda, who breathes with the help of a tracheostomy, arrives at King's after experiencing respiratory failure at home, and student Amy, 20, has been coughing up blood.
6	"Next of Kin"	18 December 2013	2.42
Doctors are concerned that 38-year-old Stacie may be paralysed following an accident at a friend's all-night party, while 19-year-old veterinary student Ashleigh is rushed into A&E after being involved in a high-speed head-on car crash. Elsewhere, Peter, 78, arrives at King's with abdominal pains, and as he receives treatment, he paints a picture of his eventful life.

=== Series 5 (2014) ===
No.	Title	Original release date	UK viewers (millions)
1	"A Time to Laugh"	8 January 2014	2.65
It's Red Nose Day, but there's little to laugh about for 33-year-old Dilson, who is rushed in with knife wounds to his head and neck after being attacked outside a nightclub. Meanwhile, 79-year-old Doreen has broken her wrist in a fall at home, and parents Keeley and Michael are concerned by the fact their toddler Cydney hasn't urinated for two days.
2	"Pick Me Up"	15 January 2014	2.71
50-year-old mechanical engineer Graham is rushed into King's College Hospital in south London with a suspected heart attack. Meanwhile, 71-year-old Pat is found unconscious by her husband, and 65-year-old Mick is discovered lying in the street with blood coming out of his ear. In both cases, the medics suspect brain haemorrhages, so scans are required.
3	"Luck of the Draw"	22 January 2014	2.00
Doctors run tests on 89-year-old Alyce, who has been brought to King's by ambulance after falling near her home, and 23-year-old groom-to-be Sean is examined following an epileptic seizure lasting most of the night. Meanwhile, John, 57, has had bouts of delirium as a result of liver disease and may have developed hepatitis C after experimenting with drugs 40 years ago.
4	"Wake up call"	29 January 2014	2.00
Arriving at King's College Hospital this week is 56-year-old Malcolm, who is put on life support after a cardiac arrest. Nightclub host Phil, 36, receives treatment for chronic pain in his back and side, and realises his party lifestyle is taking its toll, while medics discover 61-year-old Bob has had a stroke. Doctors also see to Kamilla, 12, who has been knocked down by a car on a pedestrian crossing.
5	"City of Angels"	5 February 2014	2.16
Tensions run high at King's College Hospital when police suspect a patient is concealing a weapon, while 58-year-old mother-of-four Hillary arrives in resus with a severe head injury after falling from her horse. Icylyn's bloated abdomen baffles the medical team and she has to wait overnight for a diagnosis, and 14-year-old Chloe receives treatment following her involvement in a fight.
6	"The Fall"	12 February 2014	2.28
Sister Jen is on duty in resus looking after 48-year-old Bobby, who has been having seizures at home. Meanwhile, 70-year-old Ronald had to cut short his 46th wedding anniversary celebrations when he experiences breathing difficulties, and Rienelle, seven, receives treatment after falling from the top of a climbing frame at school.
7	"Amongst Friends"	19 February 2014	2.11
Registrar Ling is concerned about 23-year-old David, who has been brought to King's College Hospital after having seizures for 30 minutes and isn't responding to drugs. Ling weighs up the benefits of putting him into an induced coma to stop the attacks. Meanwhile, 49-year-old Suzette is brought in following an accident involving a cyclist, and Selin is accompanied by her best friend Maria to receive treatment for a cut.
8	"Bolt From the Blue"	26 February 2014	2.35
The team treats 78-year-old Kevin, who had a cardiac arrest at the gym and fortunately received life-saving treatment at the scene from an instructor trained to use a portable defibrillator. Meanwhile, 23-year-old paramedic Declan is sent for an emergency CT scan, and Monica, 83, is experiencing numbness in her leg following a fall at home, and her initial X-ray appears to indicate she has a broken neck.

=== Series 6 (2014) ===
No.	Title	Original release date	UK viewers (millions)
1	"Stand by Me"	7 May 2014	2.77
Four-year-old Alfie is rushed in with a broken thighbone after falling off his bike, the medical team suspects 19-year-old rugby player Chris has suffered neck and spinal injuries, while James, 42, arrives with chest pains and breathing difficulties.
2	"Young at Heart"	14 May 2014	1.91
Laura's family faces a big decision when the 72-year-old grandmother is found to have a blood clot on her brain, while father-of-three Nic, the over-40s National BMX Champion, collapses in reception after suffering an accident while training for a stunt. The medics also treat 83-year-old Marjorie, who is complaining of a pain behind her eye following a recent bout of shingles.
3	"Going the Distance"	21 May 2014	2.34
Brian, 74, is brought into King's by ambulance after falling backwards down a flight of stairs and being knocked unconscious at his partner's house. Sylvester arrives in paediatric A&E with his two-year-old son, who has cut his forehead on a visit to church, while 70-year-old builder Leonard has lost sensation down his left side and the medics are worried he may have had a stroke.
4	"Resilience"	28 May 2014	1.80
Ellen, 86, has been brought in by ambulance after her daughters found her collapsed at home. Her body temperature has dropped dangerously low and she's also lost five pints of blood. Meanwhile, appendicitis is suspected when 75-year-old Martin is rushed in with severe abdominal pain, and neurologists perform tests to determine whether 70-year-old mother-of-10 Lula has had a stroke.
5	"Throw of the Dice"	4 June 2014	2.03
Linden, 15, is brought to A&E having badly cut his leg while back-flipping off a shed roof onto a trampoline. Junior doctor Sammy looks after 88-year-old Panayiota, who has been referred to hospital with breathing difficulties. Meanwhile, 55-year-old lorry driver Antony has lost all feeling in his left leg, and an ultrasound scan reveals he needs emergency surgery on a blocked artery to save his limb.
6	"Family Matters"	9 June 2014	1.90
It's a busy Mother's Day at south London's King's College Hospital as 23-year-old builder Jamie is rushed in by paramedics having fallen from the roof of a three-storey building, landing on a brick wall. Four-month-old Weston has been brought to paediatric A&E after having diarrhoea and vomiting for more than 24 hours, while doctors suspect David, 74, has had a stroke. Junior doctor Matt looks after 80-year-old Daphne, who has dislocated her replacement hip.
7	"Boys Don't Cry"	16 June 2014	2.00
Max, 16, is brought to King's College Hospital by air ambulance after falling 14ft onto his face at a skate park, and the results of the CT scan show a life-threatening bleed on his brain, meaning the next 12 hours are critical, as well as being an agonising wait for his parents. Meanwhile, 13-year-old Hector has injured his hip playing football and needs an X-ray to confirm whether his leg is broken.

=== Series 7 (2014) ===
Series 7 started on 30 October 2014 with a new cast and new hospital. The new series was set at St Georges Hospital in Tooting London.

No.	Title	Original release date	UK viewers (millions)
1	"One Fine Day"	30 October 2014	2.49
The trauma team fights to save the life of a young woman, Kerry, involved in a motorbike accident, who has completely severed her right leg below the knee. An 11-year-old boy, Luke, is brought in after a prolonged epileptic seizure, and a 19-year-old arrives with a sewing needle stuck in her foot, but she seems more keen on taking advice from her mum in Lithuania than from the doctor.
2	"Seize the Day"	6 November 2014	2.52
Billy, 19, has been thrown 20ft from his motocross bike during a race, suffering multiple spinal injuries. Teacher Dave, 53, has facial injuries after riding his new bicycle into the back of a stationary car in Richmond Park, while 30-year-old adrenaline junkie and former Royal Marine Richard has badly dislocated his thumb after falling off a bike.
3	"Somebody to Love"	13 November 2014	2.29
Tree surgeon Paul, 38, is rushed into resus after falling 25ft. Meanwhile, 66-year-old Anthony, who has recently been diagnosed with Parkinson's disease and prostate cancer, has taken a tumble down a flight of stairs at home. He's very frail and a scan reveals he has broken some ribs, puncturing a lung.
4	"Stay with Me"	20 November 2014	1.79
Former boxer Paul, 22, has been stabbed in the face and arm with a broken bottle outside a nightclub in Kingston. Angela, 93, is brought to A&E by her daughter Elizabeth after suffering from blood loss and disorientation at her care home, while 70-year-old John arrives with his wife Francesca after falling while out running and dislocating his shoulder. To get John's pain under control quickly the medics give him ketamine, and the hallucinogenic side effects keep everyone entertained.
5	"Bouncing Back"	27 November 2014	1.63
Iain, 60, is rushed in by ambulance after falling 10ft off a ladder on to his head while fixing an air-conditioning unit. Student teacher Lloyd is helped into A&E by his friend Mollie after injuring his foot on an inflatable obstacle course on their last day at university. Lucy has had a trampolining accident in her family's garden and medics fear the 13-year-old may have suffered a neck injury.
6	"Strong Medicine"	4 December 2014	1.80
Eric, 75, collapsed shortly after falling from a ladder while pruning trees in his garden. He is stabilised and put in an induced coma while a CT scan is used to determine any internal injuries. IT consultant Mihhail, 29, is admitted after crashing his motorbike at high speed and again a CT scan is employed to look for hidden wounds. Meanwhile, 22-year-old performing arts student Maria complains of chest pains and 82-year-old Rusty is treated for a broken ankle sustained in a road accident.
7	"Chip Off the Block"	11 December 2014	2.21
Freddie, seven, is brought in after falling several metres from a tree in his garden. Martin, 66, collapsed at home and spent the night on the floor, and he's now experiencing poor eyesight and dizziness. Elsewhere, eight-year-old Jayden has come to St George's with swollen eyes, the result of severe hay fever.
8	"In A Heartbeat"	18 December 2014	2.46
Retired builder Roger has fallen 13ft from his daughter's roof. Folk musician Tad, 29, has come to A&E after developing a dangerously high heart rate, and doctors must use an electric shock to try to get it back to normal. Meanwhile, 69-year-old Richard is brought in after being found unwell at home by his son.

=== Series 8 (2015) ===
No.	Title	Original release date	UK viewers (millions)
1	"Modern Families"	7 January 2015	2.14
Will, 13, arrives by helicopter after a serious collision with someone during a game of baseball, while in the paediatric area, teenage parents Connor and Saffron have arrived with their six-month-old daughter Amira, concerned about the irregular heartbeat their GP spotted. Pizza delivery rider Chris, 20, is brought in to resus following a motorbike accident.
2	"Addicted to Love"	14 January 2015	2.46
A 45-year-old woman is brought in after collapsing at home with chest pains. A 53-year-old psychiatrist is rushed in following a seizure. Doctors suspect Philip might have had a stroke, but when it is revealed he was diagnosed with lung cancer several months earlier, registrar Chris believes it could be related. Finally, doctors treat a 25-year-old woman experiencing severe headaches brought on by the build-up of excess spinal fluid.
3	"Every Minute Counts"	21 January 2015	1.96
Staff at St George's Hospital tackle one of their most dramatic emergencies when 60-year-old rail worker Alan is airlifted to the helipad after being hit by a high-speed train. Meanwhile, 95-year-old Betty is brought in after experiencing breathing difficulties at home, and retired engineer James, 63, has a nasty cut to his head and weakness in his arms following a tumble down the stairs.
4	"Do No Harm"	28 January 2015	2.32
Eleven-month-old Isabel is rushed to St George's after having a fit and losing consciousness, while 22-year-old Felix is brought to A&E with a self-inflicted stab wound to his stomach. Retired engineer Bill, 68, fell 15ft from a ladder while cutting a leylandii hedge. He arrives by air ambulance with breathing difficulties and suspected multiple fractures.
5	"No Place Like Home"	4 February 2015	2.46
Peter, 85, has been brought - unwillingly - to A&E by his stepson Brian. He cut his finger on some wire two weeks earlier and his hand is swollen and won't stop bleeding. Emma, 23, is rushed to St George's after crashing her car on the way to her father's house, while doctors also see to 86-year-old Harry, who fell down a flight of stairs a day earlier but didn't seek treatment. Ciaran, 27, injured his ankle the previous night while out with friends and was given a temporary cast. Emergency nurse practitioner Helen needs to get him X-rayed and replastered, but he faces a return visit for an operation.
6	"Free Spirit"	11 February 2015	2.50
Tree surgeon David, 27, is airlifted to St George's after falling 40ft to the ground. Anne, 74, arrives with a sharp pain in her chest, 51-year-old taxi driver Mark receives treatment for a cut on his finger caused by broken glass, and 92-year-old Betty is brought in by ambulance after her carers found her with slurred speech and a shaking hand.
7	"Emergency Landing"	18 February 2015	2.17
Bob, 51, is airlifted to St George's after falling 20ft from a ladder while repairing his roof. With debris in his wound, doctors are concerned he could develop a life-threatening infection. Retired pharmacologist Anthony, 68, receives help for a chronic gas problem, while 83-year-old Gladys collapsed on the stairs at home and has a dangerously low heart rate.
8	"Free Fall"	25 February 2015	2.16
Keen rugby player Robert has a dangerously high heart rate and may need to have a pacemaker fitted. Mark, 32, has fallen 30ft from scaffolding while doing some DIY, and there's concern he may have damaged his spine. Christine, 74, arrives in A&E after an accident in her garden, and she's suffered injuries to her face.
9	"Force of Nature"	4 March 2015	2.23
Becky, 59, is rushed in after a suspected stroke, and medics are concerned she may have had a bleed on the brain. Georgia, 19, locked herself out of her flat and lost her balance trying to climb through a second-floor window, falling 20ft on to concrete. Meanwhile, 88-year-old Edith is kept under observation after collapsing at home.
10	"Don't Look Back"	11 March 2015	2.39
Nikki, 50, and her mum Angela, 68, have been involved in a serious car crash. While Nikki, who was driving, is sent for a CT scan with suspected internal injuries, Angela is treated for head wounds and a dislocated elbow. Ellen, 53, arrives with a painfully swollen elbow after falling over in a supermarket, and seven-year-old Jack is rushed to A&E with an open fracture on his arm and a blow to his head after an accident at a wedding.
11	"Guardian Angels"	18 March 2015	2.05
Zaki, 63, recently underwent a tonsillectomy following a diagnosis of throat cancer, but he has come to A&E for a serious bleed. Doctors try to save 10-month-old baby Amy, who stopped breathing at home, while 21-year-old expectant father Craig appears to have had a miraculous escape after a motocross accident, but has he learnt his lesson?
12	"Soldier On"	25 March 2015	2.41
Betting shop owner Les, 40, is rushed to St George's after losing control of his car on a country road on his way to work. Cambelle, a 21-year-old plumber, has an infected cyst that may require surgery, while 67-year-old retired doctor Patrick is brought to A&E following a horse-riding accident in which he was dragged 130ft and not found for more than two hours.
13	"Look Forward"	1 April 2015	2.10
Cora, 62, arrives by air ambulance following a high-speed road accident, which left her trapped in the car for more than an hour. Her husband Rae, 65, who was driving, is brought in soon after. Scott, 23, has badly cut his knee after a night out, and while he's being treated, he reflects on his schizophrenia diagnosis as a teenager. Retired carpenter Richard, 68, has fallen and hit his head on the pavement, but medics also want to look into his unusually low blood pressure.

=== Series 9 (2015) ===
No.	Title	Original release date	UK viewers (millions)
1	"Summer of Love"	27 May 2015	2.02
Ashley, 28, is brought in after a car pulled out into his motorbike and doctors are concerned he could have back, pelvis and internal injuries and send him for a CT scan, while 77-year-old ambulance driver Jim arrives after collapsing at the wheel of his vehicle and driving into a lamppost. Staff also treat 14-year-old Fabian, who fell 20ft from a tree and hasn't moved since and is suffering from back and neck pain.
2	"The One"	3 June 2015	2.23
Pub landlord Tony is brought in with burnt legs as a result of his barbecue gas cylinder exploding. Henry, a 93-year-old war veteran, is rushed in with severe breathing difficulties after having a heart attack, and builder Bill was knocked unconscious after falling off his shed. His CT scan reveals he has broken his neck in three places, and he may need surgery to avoid damage to his spinal cord.
3	"Never Too Late"	10 June 2015	2.17
A 68-year-old actor visits St. George's after injuring his shoulder but may be living with a more serious condition. An 88-year-old woman with a swollen leg discusses her marriage to a younger man.
4	"Take Care"	17 June 2015	2.10
The show looks at altruistic acts by patients, visitors and staff. German-born Ursula arrives in A&E having lost a lot of blood from a series of nosebleeds. A 13-year-old cyclist is sent for a CT Scan.
5	"Lean On Me"	24 June 2015	2.17
The stories of patients who have been supported by loved ones during difficult times. 66-year-old Gerald has a serious head wound after a 10ft fall. Beverly was knocked down outside her home.
6	"Keep On Moving"	1 July 2015	2.03
Featuring patients who have faced adversity head on. A 70-year-old part-time DJ has had a high speed bicycle accident while training for a 100 mile charity cycle ride.
7	"Some Like It Hot"	8 July 2015	2.26
A 40-year-old doorman has been stabbed multiple times outside the social club where he works. A student who got into a fight at a party is brought in bleeding from the ear and behaving oddly.
8	"Father's Day"	15 July 2015	2.72
80-year-old Ida has a painful knee but an X-Ray reveals something of concern. A three-year-old boy has accidentally squirted detergent into his eyes. A 60-year-old diabetic has an infected leg wound.

=== Series 10 (2015-16) ===
No.	Title	Original release date	UK viewers (millions)
1	"To Sir, With Love"	20 October 2015	2.33
This episode focuses on love between patients and their family. Sir John Cockburn, who's 89, may have had an abdominal aortic aneurysm. 10-year-old Niall has broken his arm falling from a tree.
2	"One Step at a Time"	27 October 2015	2.23
Motorcyclist Sam, who's 19, is airlifted to St George's after crashing into a bus. Seven-year-old Raheem accidentally cut his wrist while playing at home. He's worried that he might need stitches.
3	"Always on My Mind"	3 November 2015	2.52
Mike has fallen face first onto a pavement. He has a form of epilepsy that doesn't respond well to medication. Daisy, who's 22 months old, has been kicked in the head by a racehorse.
4	"Give Me Strength"	10 November 2015	2.58
This episode is about powerful bonds between patients and their families. Cyril, who's 91, arrives at St George's by air after being in a car crash. Five-year-old Roman has a pencil stuck in his ear.
5	"Handle with Care"	17 November 2015	2.28
Katrina, who's 53, has difficulty breathing and is experiencing chest pains. Angela, who's 63, was attacked by one of her cats as she shouted at a fox in her garden.
6	"Out of Sight"	24 November 2015	1.66
Josh, who's 10, arrives at A&E after an accident at school, unaware that his finger was cut off in the incident. Stonemason Guido dropped a marble slab on his finger and told his wife it's just a cut.
7	"First Impressions"	3 December 2015	1.69
Mechanic Grant has been crushed against a brick wall by his own car while he was working on it. Doug has a rare incurable condition that has caused a growth on his head which is prone to bleeding.
8	"Brave Hearts"	9 December 2015	1.92
Five-year-old Kayla is rushed into St George's struggling to breathe. She has a rare form of juvenile arthritis and has spent months at Great Ormond Street under specialist care.
9	"Independence Days"	16 December 2015	1.99
Twenty-two-year-old motorcyclist Adam has crashed into a car and been thrown 30 metres. Rosa, who's 18, fell off her bike after a night out with friends. Her mum's not impressed.
10	"Fathers and Sons"	23 December 2015	1.95
This episode is about fathers and sons. Rod, 51, has fallen 18 feet from scaffolding. Cyclist Mack, who's 19, has collided with a Porsche. His dad, Jim, reveals how adoption changed their lives.
11	"Extra Time"	30 December 2015	2.03
This episode focuses on patients and families whose positivity help them cope in tough circumstances. Paula has had tough times but has bounced back through her good humour.
12	"Glass Half Full"	6 January 2016	2.33
This episode focuses on children and being a parent. Three-year-old Louie has been run over by a car. Josh, who's 14, has injured his ankle while riding a BMX with his dad on the front.
13	"Altered States"	13 January 2016	2.37
Carole, who's 79, is rushed to A&E with signs of a stroke. She and Ted have been married for 60 years, but Ted talks about how things got off on the wrong foot when they first met as 14-year-olds.
14	"Stronger Together"	20 January 2016	1.94
Retired firefighter John is in an induced coma after being accidentally hit in the face by a golf club, the impact of which was so hard that it snapped.
15	"Stiff Upper Lip"	27 January 2016	2.08
Maura, who's 85, has fallen at home. She can't move her legs. Chef Mimi, who has cut her thumb, takes a shine to the junior doctor who's treating her, to the amusement of her flatmate.
16	"Forever Young"	3 February 2016	2.29
This episode meets patients for whom age is just a number, including 93-year-old Amy, who brought patients to St George's hospital as a volunteer ambulance driver during the Blitz.
17	"Till Death Do Us Part"	10 February 2016	2.24
Luke has cut his finger and is concerned that it could trigger a seizure; he's had epilepsy since crashing his bike then undergoing brain surgery at St George's, three years ago.
18	"Training Day"	17 February 2016	2.10
Self-declared 'independent old bugger' Harry, who's 83, is brought to St George's after collapsing while he was out shopping. And six-year-old Lilly has cut her head after falling off her scooter.
19	"Daddy's Girl"	24 February 2016	2.05
Ten-year-old Ashleigh is rushed to St George's after injuring her leg while playing football. Three-year-old Lola has had a seizure, and 91-year-old Betty has severe chest pain.
20	"Work Hard Play Hard"	2 March 2016	1.94
Robert, who's 37, is taken to St George's after a motorbike collision, and 54-year-old Mary collapses in the street on the way to work.
21	"New Horizons"	9 March 2016	2.04
Five-year-old Isa has been hit by a car, which witnesses had to lift off him. Tom, who's 26, has sliced his leg with a circular saw. Retired actor Donald has pain in his bladder.
22	"Heartbreak"	16 March 2016	2.22
Gerry, who's 75, is rushed to A&E with a dangerously high heart rate of over 250 bpm. Six-year-old Daniel has an infected blister on his foot.
23	"Through Thick and Thin"	23 March 2016	2.46
Tom, who's 13, is rushed to A&E after crashing his bike head first into a parked car while racing a friend. Jason comes to St George's after experiencing blurred vision for two days.
24	"Coming Home"	13 April 2016	1.96
Pat has injured her leg on holiday. Cyclist and dad-of-three John crashed face first into a car. Adrian, who's 89, has chest pains. He reminisces about his career as governor of Pentonville prison.

=== Series 11 (2016) ===
No.	Title	Original release date	UK viewers (millions)
1	"Quality of Life"	16 May 2016	1.56
David fell down the stairs at night; Jane, his wife, is worried but manages to see the funny side. Bob, who's 82, has had a DIY accident. Barrie has breathing difficulties.
2	"Love Thy Neighbour"	23 May 2016	1.67
Angela's heart has been beating dangerously fast for eight hours. Andy has fallen 12 feet from a tree and badly fractured both his ankles. Shane, who's three, has fallen off his grandma's trampoline.
3	"Only Yesterday"	30 May 2016	1.75
George's motorbike collided with a car and he was catapulted into the windscreen. Janine has been kicked by a horse and had to crawl across two fields to get help. Val has had a three-hour nose bleed.
4	"Keep Going On"	6 June 2016	1.78
Lauren, who's 12, has broken her leg playing rugby and needs extensive surgery. Mair, who's 89, has severe chest pain; doctors have to discuss whether she wants to be resuscitated if her heart stops.
5	"Here We Go Again"	13 June 2016	2.13
Stephan, 39, has Sudden Arrhythmic Death Syndrome, 19-year-old Emmanuel Junior has an acute attack of sickle cell disease. And 40-year-old Fernanda has abdominal pain.
6	"Dangerous Pursuits"	20 June 2016	1.95
Motorcyclist Michelle has crashed into a lamp post and broken bones in her neck, arm, ribs and shoulder. Heavily pregnant Eleanor has cut her thumb on a cleaver, a week before she's due to give birth.
7	"Lonely Hearts"	27 June 2016	1.97
Beth has fallen down the stairs and broken her ankle; her foot is hanging off and the bone is sticking out. She's determined to walk again, and faces emergency surgery and intensive physiotherapy.
8	"Love's Sacrifice"	6 July 2016	1.88
91-year-old Peter is keen to get back on his feet after a fall as he is the primary carer for his wife. Doctors are concerned about Athar, 22, who has been knocked off his bike as he wasn't wearing a helmet.
9	"You Only Live Once"	13 July 2016	2.35
Accident-prone 24-year-old Jake has had a head-on collision with another car, while 11-year-old Jack is rushed to A&E after being hit by a motorbike while walking to his first day at high school.
10	"The Handover"	20 July 2016	2.25
10-year-old Lucy has been having seizures for 48 hours. 71-year-old Tony has fallen head first onto a tiled floor while doing DIY in his kitchen and 23-year-old Charlie was attacked on a night out.
11	"One False Move"	27 July 2016	2.35
12-year-old Tulsi is airlifted to St George's after falling off a cliff near Hastings and requires emergency brain surgery. Retired mechanic Ron got his hand trapped between two vehicles while trying to fix a friend's car.

=== Series 12 (2016-17) ===
No.	Title	Original release date	UK viewers (millions)
1	"Someone to Watch Over Me"	16 November 2016	2.04
71-year-old Mel is rushed into A&E after being accidentally knocked down by her husband's car and her blood pressure has dropped critically low. Four-year-old Maddi has injured her neck after falling over on board a train.
2	"Dear Heart"	23 November 2016	2.01
25-year-old Kayley has dislocated her hip after being thrown from her horse. 52-year-old Mark has had cardiac arrest after a road accident. As he battles for survival his wife reminisces about how their friendship turned to romance.
3	"Never Say Die"	30 November 2016	1.89
Ruth's heart is beating at three times the normal rate. 80-year-old Frances has fallen into her empty swimming pool and had a head injury. 20-year-old student Jerry is questioning the wisdom of a night out after crashing her car.
4	"Time Of Our Lives"	7 December 2016	2.13
An 84-year-old is rushed to hospital after losing control of his car and crashing into a road sign, he requires an emergency transfusion after his blood pressure drops dangerously low. Seven-year-old Reggie has broken his arm.
5	"Time's Arrow"	14 December 2016	2.39
A 61-year-old woman is rushed into the CT scanner to ascertain the extent of her injuries after a car mounted the pavement and knocked her down. 91-year-old Sam arrives after having a suspected stroke.
6	"Face Value"	21 December 2016	2.48
The staff at St George's in south-west London tend to 59-year-old Debby, who cut her hand on her lawnmower. 70-year-old George has injured his eye on a piece of driftwood while in his boat on the River Thames.
7	"You've Got A Friend In Me"	28 December 2016	2.10
This edition focuses on the stories of patients whose friendships have seen them through good times and bad. 60-year-old bricklayer Phil fell off a ladder at work. After a fall 93-year-old Violet arrives with her friend Bob.
8	"In Sickness And In Health"	3 January 2017	2.35
Cameras follow couples as they cope with treatment. Corey has been rushed to St George's after having a cardiac arrest during an ice-hockey game and his wife of 7 days Alice who was watching him play when he collapsed.
9	"You Raise Me Up"	10 January 2017	2.53
Cameras follow Derren, 41, who has fractured his ankle while trampolining with his 12-year-old daughter. 54-year-old Michelle is airlifted to St George's after being involved in a car crash alongside her husband Paul.
10	"Made Of Steel"	17 January 2017	2.69
Family bonds come to the fore when 64-year-old Mohammed is brought in with serious injuries after being knocked down by a pizza delivery motorbike. 90-year-old John talks about 65 years of marriage to Iris, who has dementia.
11	"Flying Solo"	24 January 2017	2.45
Aaron, 31 is rushed to St George's after overturning his car onto spiked metal railings after a high-speed collision. One of the spikes has seriously lacerated his face - just missing his eye socket.
12	"The Tree Of Life"	31 January 2017	2.13
84-year-old Neil has fallen down the stairs at home and his wife Jenny has to face the shock that their life may change forever. Orthopaedic registrar Sadia is worried about a young man knocked off his motorbike.
13	"Carpe Diem"	7 February 2017	2.11
Niki, 34, is airlifted to St George's after crashing into another rider during a charity bike ride between London and Brighton. While staff try to contact Niki's wife 300 miles away, Peter, 90, is rushed in with blood poisoning.
14	"Catch Me If I Fall"	14 February 2017	2.11
Consultant Will is worried about potential spinal and head injuries when 63-year-old Valerie is rushed in after falling from a horse. 30-year-old Natasha has had an accident on a trampoline with her son.
15	"Flesh And Blood"	21 February 2017	2.47
This edition focuses on the ups and downs of family life and how people pull together to get through them. Pam, 53, is admitted after a suspected heart attack. Cora, 10, has been thrown by a horse.
16	"Safe From Harm"	28 February 2017	2.42
Staff and patients discuss the importance of family support when dealing with difficult circumstances. Cameras follow five-year-old Beatriz who has a rare kidney condition that affects her immune system.
17	"Sweethearts"	13 March 2017	1.91
After suffering a serious chest injury that may require surgery 40-year-old Adrian has to phone his wife - who is 1,400 miles away in Montenegro. Julia persuades husband Steve to come to hospital as he has an accelerated heart rate.
18	"Against All Odds"	20 March 2017	1.92
Doctors examine damage to the chest and lungs of a 40-year-old woman who fell off her horse, which then trampled on her. Leukaemia patient Hayley, 29, comes to St George's with wife Emma for an infection.
19	"Stand By Your Man"	27 March 2017	2.14
A long-distance lorry driver is sent for an urgent CT Scan after falling onto a concrete floor. Meanwhile, a man who has dislocated his shoulder in a cycling accident awaits treatment.
20	"Boys Will be Boys"	3 April 2017	2.02
30-year-old Chris is admitted after having a life-threatening wound during a dangerous game. 74-year-old Stafford is having problems with the internal cardiac defibrillator that he has had fitted.
21	"Candle in the Wind"	10 April 2017	2.12
Eight-year-old Billy is rushed into hospital after being crushed by falling bricks and six-year-old Luther arrives at A&E with a metal washer firmly stuck on his finger.

=== Series 13 (2017) ===
No.	Title	Original release date	UK viewers (millions)
1	"Just Seventeen"	31 May 2017	N/A
Shea and Bob are both 17. Shea has been stabbed, while Bob has impaled his leg on a fence. James, who's 33, has collapsed shortly after spending four weeks in hospital with a fractured skull.
2	"Love Through The Ages"	7 June 2017	N/A
This episode explores the changing nature of relationships between parents and children. Judith, who's 79, has been in a traffic accident. Mohammad, who's 80, has fallen at home while celebrating Eid.
3	"Growing Pains"	14 June 2017	N/A
Lewis, who's 18, has come off his motorbike and collided with two cars. Sam, who's 27, fainted and cut his lip while smoking a Cuban cigar at a barbecue.
4	"Road To Freedom"	21 June 2017	N/A
This episode explores freedom, and what happens when it's taken away. Motorcyclist Michelle has been in a crash. Frankie's been thrown from her horse. Young Merlin ran into a wall and hurt his wrist.
5	"Game Of Chance"	28 June 2017	N/A
This episode explores notions of luck and chance, when a young man is involved in a high-speed car crash, an 18-year-old breaks his leg while playing football, and a great grandmother falls down the stairs.
6	"Lost And Found"	5 July 2017	N/A
This episode explores how loss and grief can test even the strongest marriages and how finding love for a second time can save you. Kim has been hit by a lorry. Patrick has fallen from a loft ladder.
7	"Special Relationships"	12 July 2017	N/A
Lee has been in a high-speed crash. Jeroen has been knocked off his bike. The accident was caught on his camera on his helmet. Vlogger Chris has dislocated his finger playing basketball.
8	"Broken Heart"	26 July 2017	N/A
Joan has severe pain in her chest, arm and jaw. Roofer Mark has fallen 10 feet off a ladder. And Josie fell and hit her head while performing a Dirty Dancing routine on a hen do.
9	"Forget Me Not"	9 August 2017	N/A
Head teacher Emma needs a CT scan following a cycling collision with a bus, Josh has severe back pain and Pamela is worried she has a blood clot in her leg.
10	"My Guiding Star"	16 August 2017	N/A
This episode explores the importance of family. Mike, who's 79, has collapsed in the street. Chartered surveyor Andrew, 53, has tripped on a paving slab and has a suspected dislocated shoulder.
11	"Supporting Cast"	24 August 2017	N/A
Ron has a dangerously low heart rate of less than 40 beats per minute. John has been thrown from his bicycle. Florian has injured his foot. He explains how his family fled Kosovo when he was a child.
12	"Love Conquers All"	30 August 2017	N/A
This episode explores the power of love when a man is involved in a serious bicycle collision and an elderly lady becomes unwell at home.

=== Series 14 (2018) ===
No.	Title	Original release date	UK viewers (millions)
1	"The Unknown"	2 January 2018	N/A
The St George's staff try to unravel the mystery of an unknown man who has collapsed in the street. Rick has had an accident at the gym, and three-year-old Marigold has signs of a chest infection.
2	"Bringing up Baby"	9 January 2018	N/A
This episode explores the strength of parental love. Eileen, who's 87, is short of breath and has a high heart rate. Marie has collapsed with a headache. Doting dad Andy brings in 10-month-old Erin.
3	"Wrong Place, Wrong Time"	16 January 2018	N/A
This shocking episode follows three middle-aged women who are stabbed in broad daylight in a random attack in a supermarket car park in Surrey and rushed to St George's Hospital.
4	"Unconditional Love"	23 January 2018	N/A
Gary, who's 50, is brought in to A&E after a garage collapsed and fell on his legs. Maggie, who's 83, has suspected sepsis. Toddler George has drunk nail varnish remover.
5	"Shelter from the Storm"	30 January 2018	N/A
This episode shows how families unite in tough times. Richard, who's 70, has a high heart rate. Adam, who's 20, has been in a high-speed motorcycle accident. Pia, who's 10, fell and hurt her knee.
6	"Collision Course"	6 February 2018	N/A
Leon has been in a head-on collision with a car. Graham has injured himself playing rugby and lost feeling in his arms and legs. Elliott, who's four, has got a foreign object stuck up his nose.
7	"Out of the Fire"	13 February 2018	N/A
Sufia, who's five, was dragged under a car while she was on her way to school. Evadney has a badly burnt arm. She was standing near a bonfire when an aerosol exploded in it.
8	"The Courage to Go On"	20 February 2018	N/A
Zach, who's 25, has severed four of his fingers in a building site accident. Daquon, who's 10, was hit by a motorbike on his way to school and has a badly broken arm.
9	"Lost for Words"	27 February 2018	N/A
Richard has symptoms of a suspected stroke, and Peter arrives with a severe head injury.

=== Series 15 (2018) ===
No.	Title	Original release date	UK viewers (millions)
1	"Every Cloud..."	16 May 2018	N/A
Maria, who's 52 and has multiple sclerosis, comes to St George's with suspected sepsis. Six-year-old Grace has tissue stuck in her ear. Eve, who's 83, has fallen down the stairs.
2	"Born To Be Wild"	23 May 2018	N/A
This episode explores the chances that people take in life and whether a gamble ever pays off. Megan, who's 20, has been in a high-speed car crash. James, who's 78, has suspected internal bleeding.
3	"The Underdogs"	30 May 2018	N/A
Tony and his father have been in a motorbike crash. Alison has been kicked by a horse and has a broken leg. Harry, who's 12, has been in a 10-bike pile-up at a velodrome.
4	"Liberation Day"	6 June 2018	N/A
Tim came off his bike and has suspected spinal injuries. Jeanette is struggling to breathe. Mollie, who's 91, is in A&E after her daughter accidentally crashed into a lamp post.
5	"The Good Fight"	13 June 2018	N/A
Hussnain is rushed to A&E after being caught up in an accident involving a police car chasing another vehicle. And wrestler Kieran comes in after injuring his knee in a bout.
6	"Child at Heart"	20 June 2018	N/A
Stephen has shown signs of a stroke. A van ran over Billy's chest when he was in a motorcycle accident. Two-year-old Freddie has jammed his thumb in a door.
7	"Live for Today"	27 June 2018	N/A
Aiden has hurt his feet on the monkey bars at school. Mark has come off his bike. Doctors are concerned that he may have life-changing damage to his spine. Dibs has fallen 10 feet off a balcony.
8	"Safe Haven"	4 July 2018	N/A
Judy is airlifted to St George's after being trampled by cows while walking her dog. Tamzen has broken her leg at trampoline practice. Hermione has cut her hand at work.
9	"My Other Half"	11 July 2018	N/A
Three-year-old Clara has a chickpea stuck up her nose. Danny has fallen 20 feet through a skylight. Tara has severe abdominal pains. Her husband keeps her entertained in A&E.
10	"Someone to Come Home to"	18 July 2018	N/A
Richard has fallen off a ladder while he was fixing his roof. Doreen has a serious infection. Five-year-old Cojo has injured his elbow while he was wrestling with his brother.
11	"A Stubborn Kind of Fellow"	25 July 2018	N/A
Sydney has severe chest pains. Alan has fallen and fractured his elbow. John has been in a cycling accident. He went over his handlebars and was unconscious for 10 minutes.
12	"Heart of the Home"	1 August 2018	N/A
Mum of six Lillian has extremely low blood pressure. Carolyn bruised her neck and face when she slipped on wet decking on a night out. Dennis is having difficulty breathing.
13	"In the Line of Duty"	8 August 2018	N/A
Psychiatric nurse Christie has severe burns after being attacked by a patient. Joe's cousin accidentally stabbed him in the thigh. Freddie, who's two, has a pain in his eye.
14	"Heavens Above"	15 August 2018	N/A
Eddie has been weakened by chemotherapy and has severe sepsis. Ex-paratrooper Martin has sustained life-changing injuries in a paraglider crash. Graham's nose won't stop bleeding.
15	"Moving On Up"	22 August 2018	N/A
Zac has dislocated and fractured his ankle playing football. Doctors work swiftly to restore the blood flow to his foot. Ian has fallen off a lorry tailgate. Jayden has a swollen eye.
16	"A Friend in Need"	29 August 2018	N/A
Glyn's brought in after his leg's run over by a three tonne digger. John, who has severe sepsis, is admitted after a fall at home. And a toddler is brought in with diarrhoea.
17	"Down to Earth"	5 September 2018	N/A
Bridget broke her wrist on a mountain path in Greece. Derek has had a suspected stroke. Stephen has severely damaged his ankle after coming off his bike deep in the woods.
18	"Love's Young Dream"	12 September 2018	N/A
Michael's brought in with chest problems after collapsing on a golf course. Neil's rushed in with lung injuries after coming off his bike. And George grazes his eye on a branch.

=== Series 16 (2018) ===
No.	Title	Original release date	UK viewers (millions)
1	"Value of Life"	12 November 2018	N/A
Justin has a potentially life-threatening bleed on his brain following a football accident. Rich has been in a car crash and can't move his legs. His pregnant girlfriend rushes to be by his side.
2	"Mother's Courage"	19 November 2018	N/A
Jacob, who's 20, has crashed his car into a wall at high speed. Joan, who's 82, has fallen down the stairs. Young Jackson has a suspected infection on his cheek.
3	"Inside Out"	26 November 2018	N/A
Clive, who likes to tell a joke or two, has breathing difficulties. Samuel has crashed his motorbike and been thrown into the road. And two-year-old Florence's parents think she has swallowed a coin.
4	"To Have and To Hold"	3 December 2018	N/A
Nikkita, who's 27, comes to A&E with her father after having a severe epileptic seizure. Plumber Sebastian has sliced the tops of his fingers off at work.
5	"A Job for Life"	10 December 2018	N/A
Kitty, who's eight, has had two epileptic seizures and has a worryingly high temperature. Hitin has been assaulted on a night out, and doctors are worried that he has a bleed on his brain.
6	"I Will Survive"	17 December 2018	N/A
Aleks has fallen from her loft; as her husband arrives at the hospital, doctors are still unsure whether she's had permanent brain damage. Meanwhile, Ky has been knocked off her motorbike.

=== Series 17 (2019) ===
No.	Title	Original release date	UK viewers (millions)
1	"Acts of Love"	8 January 2019	N/A
This episode meets patients who do extraordinary things for the people they love, under complex and difficult circumstances. David has severe leg pain. Annie has been struggling to breathe.
2	"A Change is Gonna Come"	15 January 2019	N/A
This episode features patients whose visions of the world are rocked by life-changing events. Sergio, who's 44, and Alan, who's 71, have both been badly injured in cycling accidents.
3	"The Cards We're Dealt"	22 January 2019	N/A
Four-year-old Milly has fallen on her face. Ten-year-old Ryan has fallen and badly damaged his spleen. Maureen, who has multiple system atrophy, is struggling to breathe through her tracheostomy.
4	"Do the Right Thing"	29 January 2019	N/A
Katrina has injured her knee. Mark, who sustained brain damage in his twenties, is struggling to breathe. Three-year-old Thomas, who was born with a rare blood condition, has a high temperature.
5	"Man Down"	5 February 2019	N/A
Stanlie is airlifted to hospital after being impaled on a metal rod. Max and his two-year-old daughter Darcy have been involved in a bus collision.
6	"Walk On the Wild Side"	12 February 2019	N/A
This episode features people who've faced challenges and transformed their lives. Nicole was born a man and used to be a pop star. She's burnt her foot with caustic soda.
7	"Look Both Ways"	19 February 2019	N/A
Finn has been hit by a car while he was out jogging. Three-year-old Alf has been hit by a car too. Dave has fallen from a ladder.
8	"A Road Less Travelled"	26 February 2019	N/A
Paul has been in a collision with a van. Four-year-old Jeremy is struggling to breathe; he has a series of chronic conditions including microcephaly and epilepsy.

=== Series 18 (2019) ===
No.	Title	Original release date	UK viewers (millions)
1	"From This Day Forward"	7 May 2019	N/A
On royal wedding day, the patients at St George's - including David, who's fallen from a ladder, and John, who's fallen down the stairs - and their relatives reflect on love, devotion and commitment.
2	"Leap of Faith"	14 May 2019	N/A
Emergency consultant Ahmed rushes to save the life of a woman with an abdominal aortic aneurysm, while ensuring that the other patients in busy resus also get the attention they need.
3	"Roll with the Punches"	21 May 2019	N/A
40-year-old Tania is in resus after being knocked over by a car, 77-year-old Edwin is rushed to A&E bleeding from a tumour, and footballer Lilli has damaged her eye socket.
4	"The Extra Mile"	28 May 2019	N/A
Xintong has been flung from a go-kart at speed and doctors are concerned that there may be damage to her spine. Gary has enormous swelling in his finger, which he trapped between shopping trolleys.
5	"Mother's Little Helper"	4 June 2019	N/A
Benoit, who's nine, has abdominal pains. Doctors are concerned that it may be appendicitis. Michelle has suspected sepsis. Charley-Ann has part of an earring stuck in her ear.
6	"I'll Stand By You"	11 June 2019	N/A
Jeremy is airlifted to hospital after a collision while riding his bike, Allen has fallen down a flight of stairs, and student James has cut his arm in a skateboarding accident.
7	"Too Close for Comfort"	18 June 2019	N/A
Brooke, who's 12, has gone into respiratory arrest after having a severe asthma attack. Howard has burns from trying to put out an explosion in his shed. Cyclist Colin has fractured his collarbone.
8	"The Outsiders"	25 June 2019	N/A
This episode meets the St George's specialist stroke team. Meanwhile, Steven has severe stomach cramps, and 16-year-old Aaliyah's fingernail has been badly damaged in a fight.
9	"You Before Me"	2 July 2019	N/A
Junior, who's eight, has been hit by a car and has an open leg fracture and suspected internal bleeding. Anthony has suffered chest pain at the races and has a dangerously high heart rate.
10	"The Kids Are Alright"	9 July 2019	N/A
Cyclist Ollie, who's 16, has been in a traffic accident. Dominic's throat has been bleeding badly after he had his tonsils out. Narayan's six. He has paper stuck deep in his ear.
11	"Fix You"	16 July 2019	N/A
Greg has been knocked off his motorbike and has critical injuries to his arm and leg. Cara, who's 11, has fallen from a human pyramid doing gymnastics and has a badly broken arm.
12	"You're All I Need to Get By"	23 July 2019	N/A
Paul, who's 66, is brought to A&E with a dangerously high heart rate; Nicky has a swelling in her throat; and seven-year-old Kit has injured his chest in a golf buggy.
13	"The Survivors"	30 July 2019	N/A
After a collision with a tree, Ranjan, who's 64, is transferred to St George's. Callum, who's 20, has mysteriously collapsed, and four-year-old Scarlett has hurt her leg.
14	"Call of Duty"	6 August 2019	N/A
Jahan has severe chest pains, which doctors think could be a heart attack. His daughter reveals how he fought in the Iranian Revolution and the effect that it had on his life.
15	"Children of Men"	13 August 2019	N/A
Bridget is in the urgent care centre, with her dad, for painful and swollen tonsils. George, who's 16, is rushed to resus with a life-threatening bleed on the brain.
16	"Saving Grace"	20 August 2019	N/A
Leslie is rushed to A&E after having a stroke; Hannah has pain in her spine after falling from her horse; and Isabella, who's six, hurt her neck falling from monkey bars.

=== Series 19 (2019) ===
No.	Title	Original release date	UK viewers (millions)
1	"Endless Love"	18 November 2019	N/A
The first episode of series 19 follows two people who have come to the UK and made a home, as well as the story of a woman living with the legacy of cancer.
2	"A Pillar of Strength"	25 November 2019	N/A
Mohammad, who's 43 and has Motor Neurone Disease, is rushed to St George's with severe sepsis, while 47-year-old David has had a significant leg injury.
3	"Go Your Own Way"	2 December 2019	N/A
Mark, who's 32, is rushed to St George's, suffering a head injury due to an epileptic seizure. Anastasia, who's 80, struggles to walk due to severe pain in her leg.
4	"In Love and War"	9 December 2019	N/A
Marion, who's 73 and was recently diagnosed with lung cancer, is admitted with a life-threatening infection. Roy, who's 83, has multiple injuries after falling off his roof.
5	"A Life Less Ordinary"	16 December 2019	N/A
Lucy is rushed in after a severe seizure. Simon comes to A&E with severe neck pain. Two-year-old Sophie is in paediatrics after being sprayed in the face with a cleaning product.

=== Series 20 (2020) ===
No.	Title	Original release date	UK viewers (millions)
1	"Pressure Point"	14 January 2020	N/A
On one of the busiest days of the year at St George's, this episode focuses on motherhood, the incredible sacrifices made for our children, and what it means to have a family.
2	"Live and Learn"	21 January 2020	N/A
A motorcyclist is rushed to St George's after hitting a lamp post. A two-year-old has banged his head on concrete, and his mum has a violent tale to tell.
3	"Because the Night..."	28 January 2020	N/A
A woman who has autism is brought in after crushing her finger in a door. And 82-year-old Alec may have developed life-threatening sepsis after a chest infection.
4	"One of the Family"	4 February 2020	N/A
Maria is rushed to the emergency department after driving into a lamp post. Ronald is brought in after a fall at home. Little Ronnie is in Paediatrics after a bout of vomiting.
5	"Count My Blessings"	11 February 2020	N/A
Sylvia, who's 95, is rushed to St George's after falling down a flight of stairs. Cyclist Mark has been hit by a car at high speed and left agitated and confused.
6	"Circle of Life"	18 February 2020	N/A
A nine-year-old is rushed to St George's after falling on his head. A paediatric consultant assesses a child after an accident on a swing.
7	"Forever Changes"	25 February 2020	N/A
A look at three patients who have had potentially life-changing injuries, including a partially severed hand, a long-standing stab wound, and a serious quad-bike accident.
8	"Great Expectations"	3 March 2020	N/A
Natai is rushed to A&E with a lacerated wrist after putting his hand through a glass pane. Pauline is struggling to breathe. And 17-year-old Fahad has crippling stomach pain.
9	"Pride & Prejudice"	9 March 2020	N/A
A cyclist is rushed to hospital with head trauma after he's hit by a car. A 92-year-old falls when out walking near his home. An injured painter decorator talks about being a dad.
10	"Best Laid Plans"	16 March 2020	N/A
Muffy, who may have had a stroke, recalls her years as an air hostess with Pan Am. Steve is rushed in after hitting his head on concrete. Fleur has a pain in her leg.

=== Series 21 (2020) ===
No.	Title	Original release date	UK viewers (millions)
1	"Nothing Can Divide Us"	16 June 2020	N/A
A man is airlifted to St George's with possible significant spinal injuries after a high-speed motorbike crash on the M4. A teen motorcyclist is also brought in following an incident.
2	"Someone to Lean On"	23 June 2020	N/A
Paramedics rush 86-year-old Filippo to St George's with a suspected stroke. Susan, who's 80, has fractured her leg. And teenager Tilly has hurt her ankle during gymnastics.
3	"Never Let Me Go"	30 June 2020	N/A
This episode meets families who've endured life-changing tragedy and explores how grief can shape lives. And nine-year-old chatterbox Rezwan has a rash on his ankle.
4	"In Safe Hands"	7 July 2020	N/A
Sammy has anorexia. The 14-year-old is in paediatrics with dangerously low blood pressure, while 66-year-old carpenter Ray fell onto concrete working on a building site.

=== Series 22 (2020) ===
No.	Title	Original release date	UK viewers (millions)
1	"The Missing"	2 September 2020	N/A
A 22-year-old motorcyclist is rushed in after a crash on a dual carriageway. An 86-year-old man has a suspected ruptured aortic aneurysm - a life-threatening condition.
2	"The Sound of My Voice"	9 September 2020	N/A
Kin, who has motor neurone disease, is rushed to St George's with severe sepsis. Steve has severed three fingers with an electric saw. Teenager Jordan has been seriously injured in a car crash.
3	"Dear Father"	16 September 2020	N/A
John has a suspected aneurysm. Jamie's motorbike has collided with a car on a motorway slip road. And carpenter Noel has partially amputated his thumb using a bandsaw at work.
4	"Skin Deep"	23 September 2020	N/A
A 14-year-old is rushed in after falling head first off her bike. A 56-year-old man can't breathe due to an ear infection. And a plasterer has had a serious accident at work.
5	"Ever Decreasing Circles"	30 September 2020	N/A
James is rushed to St George's after a head-on car crash. Margaret's had a fall, but her daughter has tales to tell of her mother's adventurous life in London in the swinging 60s.
6	"The Show Must Go On"	7 October 2020	N/A
Retired saxophonist Barbara Thompson arrives at St George's with a dangerously high heart rate due to atrial fibrillation. John woke up and couldn't feel his leg. And Suzy has come to A&E after being badly bitten by her dog.

=== Series 23 (2021) ===
No.	Title	Original release date	UK viewers (millions)
1	"Count On Me"	12 January 2021	N/A
It's another hectic day at St George's as a patient is airlifted in after being knocked unconscious. And 78-year-old Ted has fallen down the stairs and seriously hurt his head.
2	"You Can't Buy Love"	19 January 2021	N/A
Harriet is rushed to St George's when the 13-year-old is knocked off her bike. Twelve-year-old Adam has a deep wound in his groin after falling from a tree and impaling his leg.
3	"Pay it Forward"	26 January 2021	N/A
A 63-year-old builder has fallen from a height. While his daughter tells of her dad's many sacrifices down the years, a teenager who's been hit by a car arrives with possible brain injuries.
4	"Enduring Love"	2 February 2021	N/A
Paul has transverse myelitis and may have suffered a stroke. Josh broke his leg playing American football. Eric's come to A&E feeling dizzy. His granddaughter's right by his side.
5	"Field of Dreams"	9 February 2021	N/A
On a busy bank holiday weekend, the St George's medics treat a man who's been hit by a car, a toddler who's had a seizure, and a man who severed four toes while mowing the lawn
6	"Going The Distance"	16 February 2021	N/A
A train driver is rushed to St George's after colliding with a car. And a gold-medal-winning 13-year-old BMX rider has a suspected pelvis injury after crashing at the race track.
7	"Learning Curve"	23 February 2021	N/A
A bartender and dad-to-be is in A&E. An 88-year-old is rushed in after being found collapsed at home. And a young doctor describes how it feels giving bad news to patients and family.
8	"Safety Net"	2 March 2021	N/A
A 21-year-old is in A&E with a suspected stroke. As the doctors run urgent tests, her dad reminisces. And James arrives with a serious leg break after being thrown from his bike.

=== Series 24 (2021) ===
No.	Title	Original release date	UK viewers (millions)
1	"Lead By Example"	31 May 2021	N/A
Mark has collapsed on the tennis court. Harry has hurt his head playing football. Newly qualified consultant Dr Mehrad talks about the pressures and satisfaction of his job.
2	"Sacrifice"	7 June 2021	N/A
Nineteen-year-old Daniel has come off his motorbike. His mum Diana hurries to hospital to be by his side. Builder William has injured his ankle while playing basketball.
3	"Someone To Talk To"	14 June 2021	N/A
A stressed 76-year-old is rushed to St George's with a deep head cut. And a mother remembers learning to love the colour of her skin after suffering racial abuse growing up.
4	"Lasting Legacy"	21 June 2021	N/A
Sir Robert, who's 93, is rushed to St George's with a low heart rate, dizziness and confusion. Brad, who has crushed his finger at work, talks about what masculinity means to him and male role models.
5	"Into The Light"	28 June 2021	N/A
An 11-year-old is brought in after being struck by a car. A woman has tripped over her cat. And a doctor describes the painful decision to live away from home for the pandemic.
6	"Everybody Needs Somebody"	5 July 2021	N/A
A patient with an ankle injury recalls how meeting her husband saved her life. And 84-year-old Ioannis is treated for dizziness as his children speak warmly of a brave, loving father.
7	"Support Bubble"	12 July 2021	N/A
A 74-year-old comes to St George's after an unexplained fall. And a woman with possibly life-changing injuries from playing rugby talks about her issues with mental health.
8	"Blink of an Eye"	19 July 2021	N/A
New parents Danny and Jordan are worried that five-day-old Gracie may have an infected umbilical cord. They talk about life changes and the joy of becoming parents.
9	"Turn Back Time"	26 July 2021	N/A
Leo is in A&E after crashing his car and flipping it onto its roof. Young Kieran's hurt his wrist coming off his skateboard. And 91-year-old Lillian has had a hard fall at home.
10	"With or Without You"	2 August 2021	N/A
Stroke specialist Bryan's having a tough day as two patients arrive at St George's displaying severe symptoms. And is Ronnie's back pain kidney stones or something more serious?

=== Series 25 (2021) ===
No.	Title	Original release date	UK viewers (millions)
1	"Back to Square One"	2 December 2021	N/A
Karan is rushed to St George's with a leg fracture from football. Will has a painful swelling on his head and recalls how his life changed after he was assaulted as a teenager.
2	"In the Wars"	9 December 2021	N/A
Iris, who's 91, comes to St George's with two severe leg fractures. Medics are worried that she may not survive. Elijah has injured a finger on a kebab slicer. Alison has sepsis.
3	"Keep Calm And Carry On"	14 December 2021	N/A
Chris comes to A&E with a suspected broken back after falling off a ladder while doing the gardening. Liam collided with a car while cycling. And Khushbo is bleeding from her throat.

=== Series 26 (2022) ===
No.	Title	Original release date	UK viewers (millions)
1	"Legacy"	18 January 2022	N/A
It's a busy day in resus for emergency care nurse Tim, including 82-year-old Pam, who has Alzheimer's and possibly sepsis. And nurse Maria treats Theo for a football injury.
2	"Lost in Translation"	25 January 2022	N/A
Nasly has a rare life-threatening complication with her diabetes. Charlie has bad chest and back pain and a complex medical history. And nurse Alison has a hectic shift in Injuries.
3	"By Your Side"	1 February 2022	N/A
Katie has multiple broken bones and internal injuries from a horse-riding accident. Amy has a deep laceration to her ankle after a lockdown party with her flatmates ended badly.
4	"A Love Without End"	8 February 2022	N/A
Bipin is rushed to A&E with a stroke. Myra, who's 80, hit her head when she fell off her bike. And emergency nurse practitioner Louise reflects on tough times in her own life.
5	"Sliding Doors"	15 February 2022	N/A
Fifteen-year-old Meldred is rushed into A&E after being stabbed in the thigh by a stranger while walking to school. Sports commentator Andrew has a mysterious rash on his ankle.
6	"I Got You Babe"	22 February 2022	N/A
Dad-to-be Josh, who's 27, has come off his motorbike at speed. Georgie brings in her 10-month-old son Phoenix, who's been sucking on a bleach tablet.
7	"Hope Springs Eternal"	8 March 2022	N/A
Colin's collapsed in his garage. Is it a stroke or linked to his brain tumour diagnosis? Dr Yuki reflects on life in lockdown. And 88-year-old Tony has severe pain in his fingers.
8	"Where there's a will..."	15 March 2022	N/A
It's a busy day in Resus for new consultant Sobi, with 15-year-old Gus going over the handlebars of his bike and Patricia, who's 73, is in extreme pain due to a dislocated shoulder.

=== Series 27 (2022) ===
No.	Title	Original release date	UK viewers (millions)
1	"Lessons in Life"	11 July 2022	N/A
Mery is 17 weeks pregnant and in St George's after falling down the stairs. Jessica has a netball injury. And a junior doctor carries out a chest procedure for the first time.
2	"Something Charged"	18 July 2022	N/A
Seventy-year-old Jim has come to A&E with difficulty breathing. Savita and her five-year-old son have been hit by a car. And Terry has foot and knee pain after surgery.
3	"An Education in Happiness"	25 July 2022	N/A
Nurse Emma has a narrow window of time to help 71-year-old Thomas after a suspected stroke. And 97-year-old Leslie is brought to A&E after experiencing persistent nosebleeds.
4	"A Love Like No Other"	1 August 2022	N/A
A cyclist is in A&E with serious puncture wounds after colliding with a deer. Doctors are concerned 34-year-old Jenny is having a heart attack. And toddler Teddy has a limp.
5	"You Are Not Alone"	8 August 2022	N/A
Kerrie is rushed to A&E with a suspected stroke. Jitendra has severely cut his hand while cooking for his family. And Bayan, who's 24, is experiencing facial numbness.
6	"A Hand To Hold"	15 August 2022	N/A
Eighty-year-old Michael has suspected sepsis. Sayfur has had an epileptic seizure. And diving coach Laura, who's a bit of a daredevil, has broken her ankle while ice skating.

=== Series 28 (2022) ===
No.	Title	Original release date	UK viewers (millions)
1	"Reach Out Your Hand"	5 September 2022	N/A
Fifty-year-old Sara is rushed to A&E after collapsing at work with a thunderclap headache. And Flynn was hit by a car while riding his bike and has hurt his leg.
2	"A Load to Carry"	12 September 2022	N/A
Trina's brought to A&E struggling to breathe. Sammy has chest pains and a history of emphysema. And Ella gets unexpected news when doctors X-ray her knee.
3	"Sons and Daughters"	19 September 2022	N/A
Anthony is in resus with possible internal bleeding after coming off his bike. And Jack is transferred to St George's with suspected nerve damage after falling off his e-scooter.

=== Series 29 (2022) ===
No.	Title	Original release date	UK viewers (millions)
1	"Falling Down"	3 October 2022	N/A
Graham, who's 50, is rushed to hospital after falling off his motorbike at high speed. Meanwhile, 76-year-old Joyce is struggling to breathe after a fall at home.
2	"Time to Care"	10 October 2022	N/A
A 79-year-old has chest injuries after a garden fall. A London Underground worker has had a suspected heart attack. And an ex-sailor has an infected splinter in his arm.
3	"My Happy Place"	17 October 2022	N/A
Lynn is rushed to A&E after collapsing from a brain aneurysm. James is treated for a severely dislocated shoulder. And 30-year-old Lucas has a suspected urinary tract infection.

=== Series 30 (2023) ===
Series 30 started on 3 January 2023 with a new cast and new hospital. The new series was set at Queen's Medical Centre in Nottingham.

No.	Title	Original release date	UK viewers (millions)
1	"Tales Of The Unexpected"	3 January 2023	N/A
In Nottingham, at Queen's Medical Centre, one of the busiest A&Es in Europe, young Hunter's been rushed in after falling from a tree.
2	"Husbands And Wives"	10 January 2023	N/A
Mick is rushed to Queen's with suspected sepsis. Keith arrives with one of the highest heart rates the department has ever seen. And Jillian has had a fall at a charity event.
3	"Keep The Faith"	17 January 2023	N/A
Eighteen-year-old Kye is rushed to Queen's after going into cardiac arrest during a football training session. Student Phoebe has hurt her nose after tripping over in a library.
4	"The Unforeseen"	24 January 2023	N/A
Peta is rushed to A&E after being knocked unconscious coming off her motorbike. Callum has a badly prolapsed stoma. And Libby's been hit in the face playing hockey.
5	"Teenage Dreams"	31 January 2023	N/A
Staff deal with a crime wave of needle-spiking attacks on female university students, including Kate, who collapsed at a nightclub.
6	"People Like Us"	7 February 2023	N/A
A 21-year-old has crashed his motorbike into a telegraph pole and has serious leg and lung injuries. And a patient with the paralysing locked-in syndrome is struggling to breathe.
7	"I'll Be There"	14 February 2023	N/A
A woman is rushed in after a serious car crash. Simon fell off his bike on his way to buy a helmet. And James, who severed his finger climbing, talks of the love he feels for his dad.

=== Series 31 (2023) ===
No.	Title	Original release date	UK viewers (millions)
1	"The Fighter"	10 July 2023	N/A
Staff at Queen's Medical Centre, Nottingham, help Kaeden, a 16-year-old with a serious illness, and a biker who's had a fall, plus a woodworker with a sliced thumb.
2	TBA	17 July 2023	N/A
3	TBA	24 July 2023	N/A
4	"Life's too Short"	31 July 2023	N/A
Keith is rushed to Queen's after a cardiac arrest. Joanna has a spinal fracture after falling off a horse. And 76 year old John has been run over by a car while out shopping.

=== Specials ===
Title	Original release date	UK viewers (millions)
"The Making Of 24 Hours In A&E"	5 June 2013	1.07
This documentary takes a look behind the scenes at how this large-scale production is made through every stage of the process. This programme captures the rig being set up, as 92 remotely operated cameras, 100 microphones and 16 miles of wiring are installed in the department by technicians. The programme shows how the crew of 170 – an unprecedented number for a documentary – is assembled and trained.
"24 Hours In A&E for Stand Up To Cancer"	19 October 2016	N/A
A woman with a weak immune system owing to the radiotherapy she underwent for breast cancer is bitten by her cat, a minor injury that could cause her serious problems. A 71-year-old with terminal cancer is brought in with breathing difficulties and a decision must be made about whether to resuscitate her if her condition worsens. Meanwhile, a 12-year-old translates for his Brazilian grandmother and a five-year-old has her head wound stitched.
"24 Hours in A&E: Heart Special"	17 March 2020	1.66
This one-off will revisit the stories of three people who previously featured on the series treated for cardiac problems at St George's Hospital. Corey, who had cardiac arrest while playing ice hockey, and Angie, whose heart has been beating at more than 150 beats per minute for eight hours, risking a stroke and other complications.
"24 Hours in A&E: Remembrance Day"	14 July 2020	2.28
A return to some of the most memorable stories from south London's St George's hospital, including Sir John and his devoted son, and three-year-old Shane with a suspected broken leg
"24 Hours in A&E: Ready For Anything"	21 July 2020	2.34
A return to memorable stories from King's College and St George's. Jim, who's 79, chats to nurses about lessons he's learnt from life. Van driver Tony has been in a collision.
"24 Hours in A&E: On The Edge"	28 July 2020	2.11
A return to some memorable stories from King's College A&E, including a builder who fell down a hole, and a reformed prisoner who turned his life around due to the love of his wife
"24 Hours in A&E: Survivors"	4 August 2020	N/A
A return to memorable stories about patients and staff who've overcome setbacks and adversity. Four-year-old Maddi, who previously had complex neck surgery, has fallen over on a train.
"24 Hours in A&E: Miracles"	14 October 2020	N/A
A look back at some memorable stories from down the years, including Sam, a motorcyclist who crashed into a bus and was thrown under a car, leaving him bent double with multiple fractures
"24 Hours in A&E: Family Ties"	11 November 2020	N/A
A look back to the stories of two patients with severe injuries. David's airlifted to King's after a 30-foot fall. Jade has been hit by a car and run over by a bus, and is in intensive care.
"24 Hours in A&E: Journey Of Life"	18 November 2020	N/A
More memorable stories from St George's, including a woman with unexplained tremors, and an ex-NHS nurse who reminisces about growing up in Trinidad and her early years working in the UK
"24 Hours in A&E: Guardian Angels"	25 November 2020	N/A
A look back at the remarkable story of an unknown woman who was punched and knocked unconscious by a stranger as she walked home, and the good samaritan who helped to save her life
"24 Hours in A&E: Never Really Alone"	9 March 2021	N/A
A fond look back at some memorable patients filmed at King's in south London, including a 72-year-old with a clot on her brain, and a woman who fell off her chair at bingo
"24 Hours in A&E: Worlds Collide"	30 March 2021	N/A
A look at some memorable stories filmed at St George's, south London, showcasing patients who have come to London from all over the world, including Mohammed, from Somaliland, who's been hit by a bike
"24 Hours in A&E: Labour of Love"	10 August 2021	N/A
Some memorable stories filmed at King's - from the aftermath of a motorway crash to a concerned teen mum and a Yorkshire couple in crisis on a trip down south
"24 Hours in A&E: Turn Back the Clock"	17 August 2021	N/A
A look back at some memorable moments at St George's Hospital in south London, including a father-and-son BMX disaster, a robbery gone wrong, and a man who plunged 15 feet onto concrete
"24 Hours in A&E: Precious Time"	24 August 2021	N/A
In this reprise of memorable stories, Derren comes to St George's after fracturing his ankle while trampolining, and a former lollipop lady has been attacked by one of her cats
"24 Hours in A&E: A Better Life"	31 August 2021	N/A
A five-year-old is rushed to St George's after being hit by a car. And student Florian describes his dramatic life story from Kosovo to London.
"24 Hours in A&E: Just The Way You Are"	7 September 2021	N/A
A collection of memorable stories from St George's Hospital, including a woman with MS who is brought in with suspected sepsis. As doctors work to regulate her temperature, her husband talks about their life together and how they supported each other through her diagnosis. Mel is rushed to St George's after being accidentally knocked down and run over by her husband John. The 71-year-old's blood pressure drops critically low and doctors call a Code Red, putting her on standby for an emergency blood transfusion.
"24 Hours in A&E: One True Love"	1 March 2022	N/A
A look back at some of the most memorable staff and patient stories filmed since 2011. At St George's, 79-year-old Carole is rushed to A&E with signs of a stroke. Neurologist Dr Mahinda decides to give her a "clot-busting" drug, but it only has a one-in-eight chance of success. Meanwhile, 10-year-old Aiden has hurt his foot on the monkey bars at school and part-time wrestler Kieran comes in after injuring his knee in a bout.
"24 Hours in A&E: Into the Light..."	7 March 2022	N/A
11-year-old Ashanti is rushed to St George's after being struck by a car. 26-year-old Reiss has come to the injuries department after hurting his Achilles tendon during a game of football. And 60-year-old Julie tripped over her cat and fell down the stairs.
"24 Hours in A&E: A Life's Work"	21 March 2022	N/A
A look back at some memorable stories. Eight-year-old Billy has been crushed by falling bricks and needs urgent surgery. Luke cut his finger at work and dreads an epilepsy seizure.
"24 Hours in A&E: Someone To Stand By Me"	28 March 2022	N/A
A look back at some memorable patients at St George's. A retired firefighter has been accidentally hit in the face with a golf club. Four-year-old Elliott has an object stuck up his nose.

== Related shows ==
The production company behind the series (The Garden Productions) have also made a four-part observational documentary series about mental health. Two years in the making, Bedlam was filmed within clinical services provided by South London and Maudsley NHS Foundation Trust (SLaM). Both SLaM and King's College Hospital are part of King's Health Partners Academic Health Sciences Centre.

Keeping Britain Alive: The NHS in a Day, also made by The Garden Productions, but for BBC Two, was based on the inverse premise to 24 Hours in A&E: instead of observing different days in a single institution, the eight-part series followed the work of a variety of NHS services on a single day, Thursday 18 October 2012. The series aired from March 2013.

Due to the success of 24 Hours in A&E, Channel 4 commissioned a series with the same format that follows police officers in Luton, called 24 Hours in Police Custody.

== Awards and nominations ==
Year	Awards	Category	Result	Refs
2012	Royal Television Society Awards	Documentary Series	Won	
