= National Psychosis Unit =

Coordinates: 51.38087°N 0.03061°W

- South London and Maudsley NHS Foundation Trust (SLaM NHSFT)
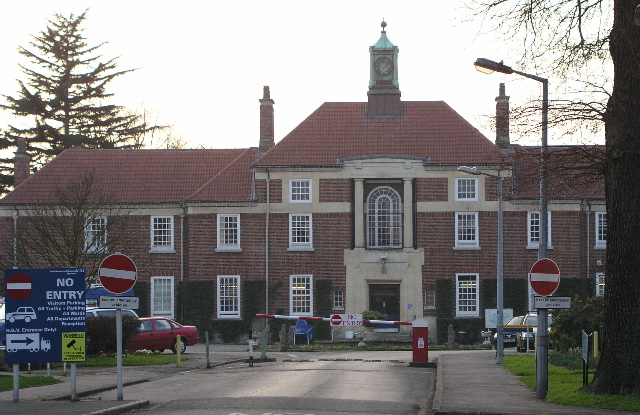

Geography
- Location: Bromley, London, England, United Kingdom

Organisation
- Care system: Public NHS
- Type: Specialist (tertiary care)
- Affiliated university: Institute of Psychiatry, King's College London

Services
- Emergency department: No Accident & Emergency
- Beds: 24

Links
- Website: http://www.national.slam.nhs.uk/services/adult-services/psychosis/
- Lists: Hospitals in England

The National Psychosis Unit is a national treatment centre for patients with schizophrenia and other psychotic disorders, in the United Kingdom. The unit is a tertiary referral centre in the National Health Service. It is located at the Bethlem Royal Hospital, part of the South London and Maudsley NHS Foundation Trust. It is closely affiliated to the Institute of Psychiatry, King's College London, and forms part of the Psychosis Clinical Academic Group of King's Health Partners.

== History ==
The Unit was set up in the early 1990s. It was one of the first units in the UK to offer the antipsychotic drug clozapine, following its reintroduction in the UK in 1990.

== Staff ==
The service has a multidisciplinary team of doctors, nurses, pharmacists and psychologists, many of whom work part of their time as clinical scientists and researchers, investigating the causes of psychotic disorders, and the effectiveness of both existing and new treatments.

- Sir Robin Murray, Professor of Psychiatric Research at the Institute of Psychiatry at King's College London, is a prominent member of staff at National Psychosis Unit.

== Treatment ==
The National Psychosis Unit specialises in evidence-based treatment for people with schizophrenia, bipolar disorder and other similar disorders, particularly where local treatment has been unsuccessful or only partially successful in relieving symptoms. Anyone receiving NHS treatment can access the service free of charge following a referral by the person’s psychiatrist or general practitioner

The service provides second opinions on medication, diagnosis or any other aspect of care. The service has an outpatient clinic and 24-bedded inpatient facility. As well as pharmaceutical treatments, there is a strong focus on psychological treatments, rehabilitation and recovery, and reducing the risk of readmission through exploring what has led to breakdowns in the past and how to avoid this happening in future. The Unit also hosts research into the treatment of psychosis, including clinical trials of new treatments for psychosis. The National Psychosis Carers' Group, which meets monthly, supports the carers and families of people with psychosis and allows them a forum for discussion.

== Links with other organisations ==
The National Psychosis Unit has strong links with the Department of Psychosis Studies at the Institute of Psychiatry, King's College London. The Unit also has longstanding links with mental health charities, including Rethink and SANE.

== Awards ==
The Unit won the Hospital Doctor Psychiatric Team of the Year Award in 1997.

== See also ==
- Mental health in the United Kingdom
