= David Nath =

British producer and director

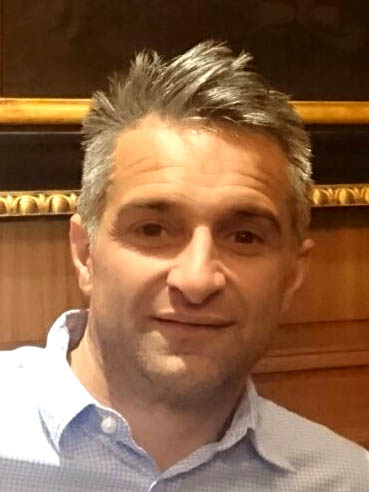
- Nath in London, July 2016
- Occupations: Documentary producer and director
- Awards: British Academy Television Awards 2014, 2016; Grierson British Documentary award 2013

David Nath is a British producer and director, best known for his work on television documentaries.

== Career ==
Nath directed the BBC4 documentary series The Year the Town Hall Shrank (2013), which followed the effects of the economic downturn in Stoke-on-Trent. He was series director of the Channel 4 series Bedlam (2013), which followed patients with mental health problems at South London and Maudsley NHS Foundation Trust. He directed the Channel 4 series The Murder Detectives (2015), about the investigation into the stabbing of Bristol teenager Nicholas Robinson.

Nath runs the production company Story Films with fellow BAFTA-winning filmmaker Peter Beard. Its productions include ITV's The Thief, His Wife and the Canoe and Channel 4's Deceit. He was also an executive producer of the thriller The Night Caller (2024), starring Robert Glenister and Sean Pertwee.

== Awards ==
- Grierson British Documentary awards 2013: Best Documentary Series award for The Year the Town Hall Shrank.
- British Academy Television Awards 2014: Best Factual Series award for Bedlam.
- British Academy Television Awards 2016: Best Factual Director award for The Murder Detectives.
