= Lambeth Hospital =

Psychiatric hospital in Lambeth, London

- South London and Maudsley NHS Foundation Trust
- Main entrance to the hospital in 2026

- Location within Lambeth

Geography
- Location: Stockwell, London, England
- Coordinates: 51.4666°N 0.1231°W

Organisation
- Care system: National Health Service
- Type: Specialist
- Affiliated university: King's College London

Services
- Emergency department: no
- Beds: 79
- Speciality: Psychiatric hospital

Links
- Website: http://www.slam.nhs.uk

Lambeth Hospital is a mental health facility in Landor Road, South London. It was previously known as the "Landor Road hospital" and is now operated by the South London and Maudsley NHS Foundation Trust and is affiliated with King's College London's Institute of Psychiatry. It is also part of the King's Health Partners academic health science centre and the National Institute for Health and Care Research (NIHR) Biomedical Research Centre for Mental Health.

== History ==
There were originally two hospitals on the site: the Stockwell Smallpox Hospital, which opened in 1871, and the Stockwell Fever Hospital, which opened shortly thereafter; these two hospitals combined in 1884 to form the South Western Fever Hospital. It joined the National Health Service in 1948 as the South Western Hospital and contained an out-patient facility, known as the "Landor Road Day Hospital" for psychiatric patients. It closed in the early 1990s and, following demolition in 1996, was replaced by a new mental health facility known as Lambeth Hospital. The new mental health facility was named after a previous Lambeth Hospital, which had opened on the site of Lambeth Workhouse in Renfrew Road, in 1922.

In 2014, the Triage ward of the new hospital was featured in an episode of the Channel 4 documentary series Bedlam.

The NHS South East London Clinical Commissioning Group announced in May 2020 that Lambeth hospital would close with the services moved to a new building on the Maudsley Hospital site. South London and Maudsley NHS Foundation Trust announced a consultation in July 2020 on proposals to sell land so that 570 houses could be built on the site.

== Services ==
Map of the Lambeth Hospital site (2026)

Lambeth Hospital is situated in Stockwell, within walking distance of Clapham High Street railway station and Clapham North tube station. The hospital site includes the following buildings:

- Bridge House: Spring Ward (Female Forensic, Medium Secure Service)
- Oak House: Luther King Ward (Male Acute), Nelson Ward (Female Acute), Rosa Parks Ward (Mixed Acute) and Eden Psychiatric Intensive Care Unit (Male PICU)
- Reay House: Early Intervention in Psychosis Unit and Tony Hillis Unit
- Mckenzie House (Ward in the Community)
- Orchard House (Outpatient Services)
- Landor House

== See also ==
- Healthcare in London
- List of hospitals in England
- King's Health Partners
