= Robin Murray =

British psychiatrist (born 1944)

Sir Robin Murray
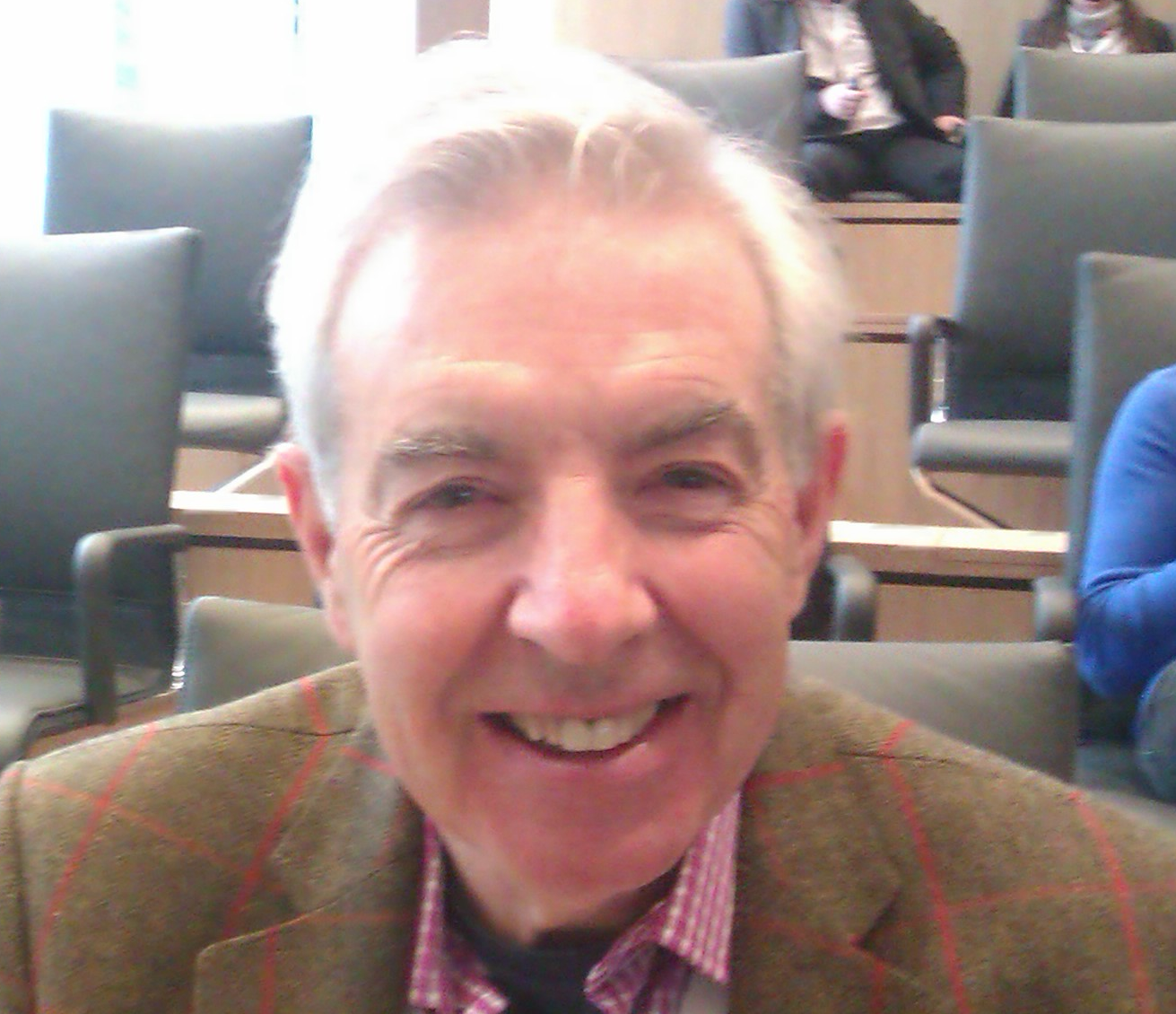
- Born: Robin MacGregor Murray; 31 January 1944 (age 82); Glasgow, Scotland
- Citizenship: British
- Education: University of Glasgow
- Scientific career
- Fields: Psychiatry, Schizophrenia, Bipolar Disorder, Psychosis
- Workplaces: Institute of Psychiatry; King's College London

Sir Robin MacGregor Murray FRS (born 31 January 1944 in Glasgow) is a British psychiatrist, Professor of Psychiatric Research at the Institute of Psychiatry, Psychology and Neuroscience, King's College London. He treats patients with schizophrenia and bipolar illness referred to the National Psychosis Unit of the South London and Maudsley NHS Trust because they fail to respond to treatment, or cannot get appropriate treatment, locally. He sees patients privately if they are unable to obtain an NHS referral. He can be contacted at Kings College.

== Education and career ==
Robin Murray trained in medicine at the University of Glasgow. After qualifying, he researched chronic renal failure induced by the massive abuse of a local headache powder, Askit Powders. Then he started training in psychiatry at the Maudsley Hospital in London and has remained there ever since apart from one year at the National Institute of Mental Health in the USA. He has been Dean of the Institute of Psychiatry, King's College London, and Professor of Psychiatry there, but now focuses on research into and care of people with psychotic illness. In 1987 he and Shon Lewis were among the first to suggest that schizophrenia might in part be a neurodevelopmental disorder.

Professor Murray is part of The Psychosis Research Group at the Institute of Psychiatry, perhaps the largest (by number of papers produced per annum) in the world. It uses a range of methods to improve understanding and treatment of psychotic illnesses, particularly schizophrenia. Murray is ranked as one of the most influential researchers in psychiatry by Thomson Reuters' Science Watch and 3rd in schizophrenia and psychosis research.

In 1994, he was the president of the European Association of Psychiatrists; now the European Psychiatric Association. He is a Fellow of the Royal Society (elected 2010) and also a Fellow of the Royal College of Psychiatrists. Murray is co-editor-in-chief of Psychological Medicine. He was Chairman of the Schizophrenia Commission which, over 2011 and 2012, reviewed in detail the care of people with psychosis in England, and concluded people with this illness were neglected, often poorly treated and subject to discrimination. The Commission made numerous recommendations for improvement.

Robin Murray and colleagues have shown that in addition to genetic vulnerability, a range of environmental factors can contribute to the onset of psychosis. These include obstetric complications and other neurodevelopmental hazards, childhood adversity, being a migrant, drug abuse, and adverse life events. Murray and colleagues were among the first to demonstrate that prolonged heavy abuse of cannabis can contribute to the onset of psychosis, and that starting early before 15 years and using high potency cannabis (e.g. skunk) particularly increase the risk. In 2009 Murray had a public disagreement with David Nutt in the pages of The Guardian about the dangers of cannabis in triggering psychosis; Nutt disputing the causal link. . Murray previously wrote that while the risk increase is "about five-fold [...] for the heaviest users", the issue has become a political football. Murray has commented repeatedly on these issues in BBC articles and programs, including in a Panorama documentary on BBC One.. However, nowadays there is little dispute, and it is generally accepted that cannabis use is the most preventable cause of psychosis. Unfortunately, with increasing use and potency of cannabis, rates of cannabis-induced psychosis are increasing in many countries. Currently, Murray and colleagues are researching why some people are especially vulnerable to this drug while most develop no problems. He and his wife, Professor Marta Di Forti, have developed an NHS clinic especially for those with problems

== Knighthood ==
Murray was knighted in the 2011 New Year Honours for his services to medicine.. He is one of the few psychiatrists to have become a Fellow of the Royals Society (2010).

== See also ==
- Substance abuse
- Effects of cannabis
