= Lambeth Workhouse =

Former workhouse in Lambeth, London, England

Coordinates: 51.4923°N 0.1053°W

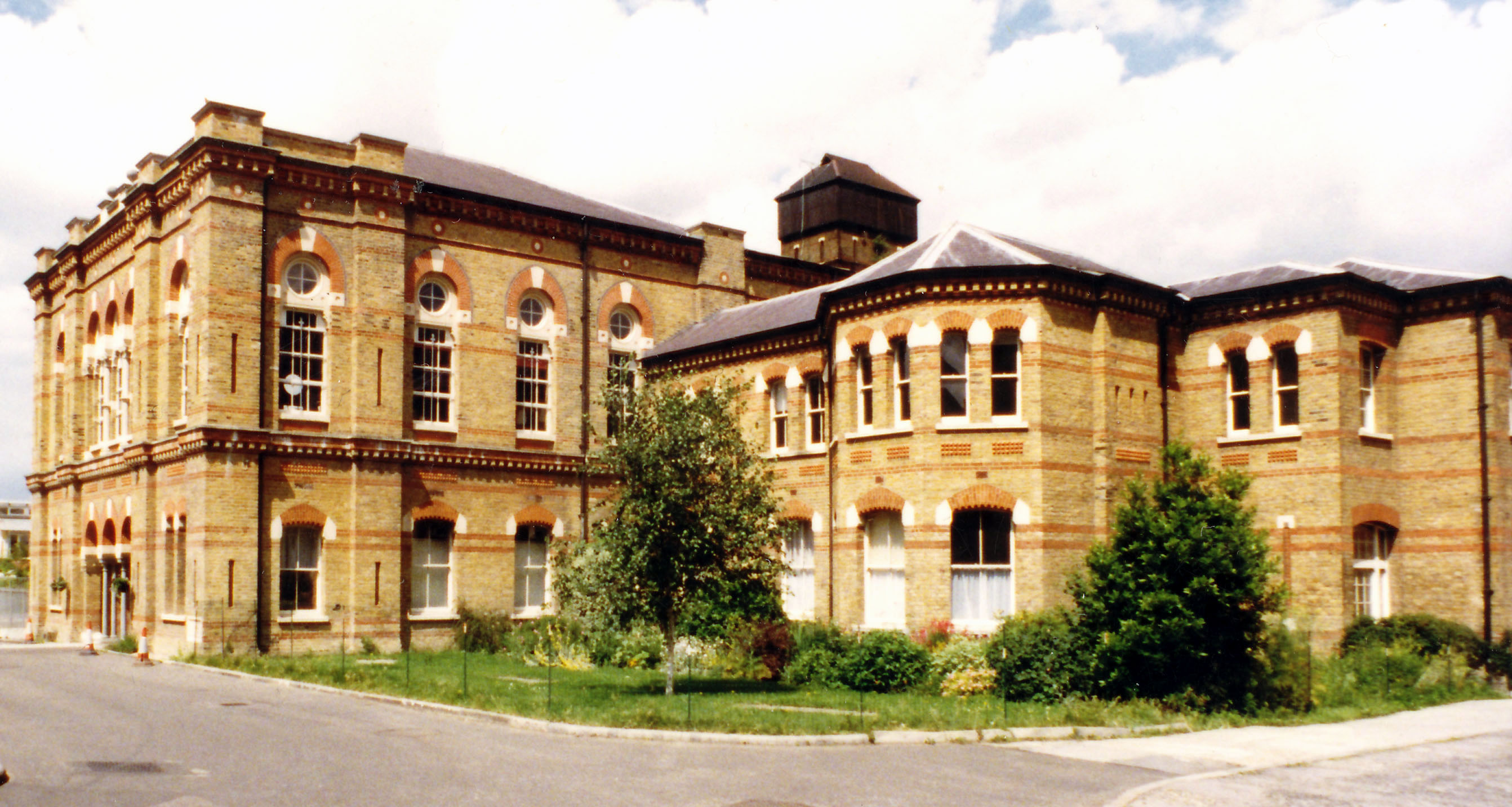
The Cinema Museum, formerly the master's house and chapel of Lambeth Workhouse.

The Lambeth Workhouse was a workhouse in Lambeth, London. The original workhouse opened in 1726 in Princes Road (later, Black Prince Road). From 1871 to 1873, a new building was constructed in Renfrew Road, Lambeth. The building was eventually turned into a hospital. The workhouse's former master's house and chapel are now occupied by the Cinema Museum which is a grade II listed building.

The 19th-century workhouse was built for 820 inmates, divided by sex into two groups. It cost £64,000 to build and replaced the workhouse in Princes Road.

The water tower of the workhouse is Grade II listed. In 2011, it was converted into an unusual residence with a lift and observation gallery made from the large water tank on the eighth floor. The new interior was designed by Sue Timney and the development was featured on the television show Grand Designs.

The hospital was named Lambeth Hospital in 1922, which later gave its name to the psychiatric hospital in Clapham.

== Notable residents ==
- Charlie Chaplin was sent to the Lambeth Workhouse when he was seven years old, as a consequence of the financial difficulties of his family.
- Mary Ann Nichols (Polly), said to be Jack The Ripper's first victim, was an intermittent resident (from 1880 to her death in 1888); she was forced to leave her husband and children from their shared home (due to his affair) and was unable to feed and house herself.
