= Bedlam (2013 TV series) =

British television documentary series

- Genre: Mental health care documentary
- Directed by: David Nath
- Country of origin: United Kingdom
- Original language: English
- No. of series: 1
- No. of episodes: 4

Production
- Executive producer: Amy Flanagan
- Producer: Peter Beard
- Production location: South London and Maudsley NHS Foundation Trust
- Production company: The Garden Productions

Original release
- Network: Channel 4
- Release: 31 October – 21 November 2013

Bedlam is a British mental health documentary that was filmed at South London and Maudsley NHS Foundation Trust (SLaM). The series offers unprecedented access to clinical services, patients and staff at the Trust.

== Overview ==
The first episode of the four-part series was broadcast on Thursday, 31 October 2013 at 9 pm on Channel 4.

The first programme, Anxiety, follow patients through the 18-bed Anxiety Disorders Residential Unit at Bethlem Royal Hospital. This national unit treats the most anxious people in the country—the top one per cent—and claims a success rate of three in four patients. Some are consumed by irrational fears they've caused a road accident in their sleep, harmed strangers or have intrusive thoughts.

One of the four people featured in the documentary says that three of them relapsed within weeks of discharge. He accuses the documentary makers of deliberately misleading viewers by showing two patients apparently doing well, and not mentioning the other two, thus giving viewers the impression that they had all been cured.

The second programme is called Crisis. Cameras are allowed in Lambeth Hospital Triage ward for the first time. This is the Accident and Emergency of mental health—where patients are at their most unwell. This episode features Medical Director Dr Martin Baggaley, who has spoken out about the pressure facing mental health services in England.

The third programme, Psychosis, films a community mental health team. South London and Maudsley NHS Foundation Trust provides support for more than 35,000 people with mental health problems.

The final programme, Breakdown, focuses on older adults, including the inpatient ward for people over 65 with mental health problems at Maudsley Hospital.

== Name ==
The title Bedlam was decided upon both by SLaM, Channel 4 and The Garden Productions. It is based on the fact that SLaM can trace its roots back to 1247 when the Priory of St Mary of Bethlehem was established in the City of London. The priory, which became a refuge for the sick and infirm, was known as "Bedlam" and was the earliest form of what is now Bethlem Royal Hospital. The title has generated concern and criticism from some mental health campaigners because of what is seen as the negative, stigmatising associations with the term "Bedlam". In response, the Trust set out the process and thinking which led to the name being agreed.
