= South London and Maudsley NHS Foundation Trust =

NHS foundation trust based in London, England

- Type: NHS foundation trust
- Established: 1 April 1999
- Headquarters: Monks Orchard Road; Beckenham; BR3 3BX
- Hospitals: Bethlem Royal Hospital; Lambeth Hospital; Maudsley Hospital
- Staff: 5,593 (2018/19)
- Website: slam.nhs.uk

South London and Maudsley NHS Foundation Trust, is an NHS foundation Trust based in London, England, is one of the country’s largest and most complex multi-site providers of mental health services. It comprises four psychiatric hospitals (Bethlem Royal Hospital, Lambeth Hospital and the Maudsley Hospital), the Ladywell Unit based at University Hospital Lewisham, and over 100 community sites and 300 clinical teams. The Trust forms part of the institutions that make up King's Health Partners, an academic health science centre.

In its most recent inspection of the Trust, The Care Quality Centre (CQC) rated the Trust ‘Good’ overall following a full inspection

== Overview ==
Each year the South London and Maudsley NHS Foundation Trust provides about 5,000 people with hospital treatment and about 40,000 people with community services. In partnership with King's College London, the Trust has major research activities. This academic partnership enables the Trust to develop new treatments and to provide specialist services to people from across the UK such as the National Psychosis Unit at Bethlem Royal Hospital. The Trust forms part of the King's Health Partners academic health science centre and together with the Institute of Psychiatry, Psychology and Neuroscience at King's College London and University College London is host to the UK's only specialist National Institute for Health Research Biomedical Research Centre for mental health. In 2009/10, the Trust had a turnover of £370 million.

The Trust's work on promoting mental health and well-being, developed in partnership with the new economics foundation, has featured in the national media.

It was named by the Health Service Journal as one of the top hundred NHS trusts to work for in 2015. At that time it had 4218 full-time equivalent staff and a sickness absence rate of 3.74%. 58% of staff recommend it as a place for treatment and 59% recommended it as a place to work.

As of 2018, the trust employed 6,486 staff.

== Partnerships ==
=== South London Listens ===
The Trust is a lead partner on the South London Listen programme, a collaboration of the three south London mental health trusts, nine local authorities and over 150 community organisations working to prevent a mental health crisis as a result of Covid-19 and support community recovery.

The Trust's work on promoting mental health and well-being, developed in partnership with the new economics foundation, has featured in the national media.

It was named by the Health Service Journal as one of the top hundred NHS trusts to work for in 2015. At that time it had 4218 full-time equivalent staff and a sickness absence rate of 3.74%. 58% of staff recommend it as a place for treatment and 59% recommended it as a place to work.

== Aiming High; Changing Lives ==
The Trust launched their latest strategy, Aiming High; Changing Lives, in the autumn of 2021 with the aim of achieving five strategic ambitions:

- Deliver outstanding mental health care
- Be a partner in prevention
- Be a catalyst for change
- Build a culture of trust together
- Become effective and sustainable

== History ==
The following are some important historical dates:

- 1247. The Priory of St Mary of Bethlehem, Bishopsgate, was founded on land given by Alderman Simon Fitzmary. It later became a place of refuge for the sick and infirm. The names ‘Bethlem’ and ‘Bedlam’, by which it came to be known, are early variants of ‘Bethlehem’. It is first referred to as a hospital for ‘insane’ patients in 1403, after which it has a continuous history of caring for people with mental distress.
- 1867. In 1867, the Southern Districts Hospital (or Stockwell Fever Hospital as it became known) opened on the site which is today known as Lambeth Hospital.
- 1908. Henry Maudsley wrote to the London County Council offering to contribute £30k towards the costs of establishing a "fitly equipped hospital for mental diseases." The Maudsley initially opened as a military hospital in 1915 to treat cases of shell shock and became a psychiatric hospital for the people of London in 1923.
- 1930. Bethlem Royal Hospital moved to a new site at Monks Orchard, where it has been situated to this day.
- 1948. With the introduction of the National Health Service in 1948, the Bethlem Royal Hospital and Maudsley Hospital were merged to form a postgraduate psychiatric teaching hospital. The Maudsley's medical school became the Institute of Psychiatry.
- 1954. Sister Lena Peat and Reginald Bowen became the first community psychiatric nurses, following up patients at home who had been discharged from Warlingham Park Hospital in Croydon.
- 1997. The Ladywell Unit, located at University Hospital Lewisham, was refurbished for use by adult inpatient mental health services. The development brought together inpatient services which had previously been spread across other hospital sites (Hither Green, Guy's and Bexley).
- 1999. South London and Maudsley NHS Trust was formed – providing mental health and substance misuse services across Croydon, Lambeth, Lewisham and Southwark; substance misuse services in Bexley Greenwich and Bromley; and national specialist services for people from across the UK.
- 2006. South London and Maudsley became the 50th NHS Foundation Trust in the UK under the Health and Social Care [Community Health and Standards] Act 2003.
- 2007 The Maudsley Hospital closed its 24-hour emergency mental health clinic, amidst protest from patient groups and politicians who continued campaigning for several years for a promised replacement at nearby KCL Hospital.
- 2009. South London and Maudsley is part of one of the five Academic Health Sciences Centres (AHSCs) in the UK to be accredited by the Department of Health. King's Health Partners AHSC consists of SLaM, King's College London, and Guy's and St Thomas' and King's College Hospital NHS Foundation Trusts.
- 2014. South London and Maudsley is fined by the Parliamentary and Health Service Ombudsman for its failure to properly assess mental capacity.
- 2023. Maudsley Hospital turned 100.

== Governance ==
Ade Odunlade became South London and Maudsley NHS Foundation Trust’s new Interim Chief Executive Officer in November 2025. He brings more than 30 years of experience to the Trust, in clinical leadership, clinical transformation, workforce development learning and development, and senior management roles. He continues to chair the NHS Providers Chief Operating Officers Network.

Jane Bailey was appointed as Chair of South London and Maudsley in 2025.

== Services ==
The Trust provides a wide range of mental health and substance misuse services. The Trust provides care and treatment for a local population of 1.3 million people in south London, as well as specialist services for people from across the country. The Trust provides mental health services for people of all ages from over 100 community sites in south London, three psychiatric hospitals (the Bethlem Royal Hospital, Lambeth Hospital and the Maudsley Hospital) and specialist units based at other hospitals.

In March 2016 it established a joint venture with the Macani Medical Centre in Abu Dhabi to provide child and adolescent services with specialisms in autism, Obsessive Compulsive Disorder and eating disorders. Maudsley International also signed an agreement with the Ministry of Public Health in Qatar for expert advice to help advance Qatar's national mental health strategy.

It established a joint venture limited liability partnership with Northumbria Healthcare Facilities Management, run by Northumbria Healthcare NHS Foundation Trust in 2019. This will run its private and international work, develop its capital assets and employ its facilities staff. It will initially employ 192 existing staff. It plans rapid growth in the United Arab Emirates and China.

== New Facilities ==
New Douglas Bennett House, a modern eight-ward inpatient facility will be the new home to those currently based at Lambeth Hospital, as well as eating disorders and neuropsychiatry units. The new building is named after Dr Douglas Bennett, a consultant psychiatrist at Maudsley Hospital, who pioneered long-term care and rehabilitation services. Co-designed by patients, carers, clinicians, and specialist architects working together, the new building will offer a modern and much-improved environment for patients and staff.

The Pears Maudsley Centre for Children and Young People is a centre for child and adolescent mental health. The centre was developed in partnership with King’s College London’s Institute of Psychiatry, Psychology and Neuroscience and Maudsley Charity, to create a new approach by combining research and care. Child and Adolescent Mental Health Services (CAMHS) moved into the building in May 2026.

== Maudsley Health ==
In 2015, the Trust partnered with Macani Medical Centre and launched Maudsley Health in the United Arabs Emirates which provides adult outpatient clinics and mental health services for children and young people in Abu Dhabi.

In 2018, Maudsley Health was awarded a contract to support the Ministry of Health and Prevention to develop services in Al Amal Psychiatric Hospital in Dubai – a state-of-the-art 276 bed mental hospital that opened in 2016.

It established a joint venture limited liability partnership with Northumbria Healthcare Facilities Management, run by Northumbria Healthcare NHS Foundation Trust in 2019. This will run its private and international work, develop its capital assets and employ its facilities staff. It will initially employ 192 existing staff. It plans rapid growth in the United Arab Emirates and China.

== Performance ==
255 patients were injured in 2016-17 through use of restraints on psychiatric patients in South London and Maudsley NHS Foundation Trust. This was the third largest number in England, There were more injuries in Southern Health NHS Foundation Trust and Mersey Care NHS Foundation Trust. Critics say restraints are potentially traumatic even life-threatening for patients.

== Research and innovation ==
The Trust is a leading figure in mental health research. Research from the Trust has pushed new ideas that help make improvements to understand the treatment of mental health and for the population the Trust serves.

=== Biomedical Research Centre ===
The Trust manages the NIHR Maudsley Biomedical Research Centre, the UK's only Specialist Mental Health Biomedical Research Centre, in partnership with the Institute of Psychiatry at King's College London. The centre, which is based on the Maudsley Hospital campus, is funded by the National Institute for Health and Care Research (NIHR). Its aim is to speed up the pace that latest medical research findings are turned into improved clinical care and services.

The team at the centre are working towards 'personalised medicine' – developing treatments based on individual need. The aim is to diagnose illness more effectively and much earlier, assess which treatments will work best for an individual and then tailor the care they receive accordingly.

The BRC's development of an advanced computer programme to accurately detect the early signs of Alzheimer's disease from a routine clinical brain scan was reported in the media in 2011. The 'Automated MRI' software automatically compares or benchmarks someone's brain scan image against 1200 others, each showing varying stages of Alzheimer's disease. Another study has concerned the reduced life expectancies of people diagnosed with different mental illnesses.

In 2011 the Department of Health announced that the Trust and the Institute of Psychiatry, King's College London would receive a further £48.8m to continue running the Biomedical Research Centre for Mental Health for a further five years from 1 April 2012. An additional £4.5m was awarded to the Trust to launch for a new NIHR Biomedical Research Unit for Dementia.

=== King's Health Partners ===
The Trust is a member of the King's Health Partners academic health sciences centre, together with King's College London, Guy's and St Thomas' NHS Foundation Trust and King's College Hospital NHS Foundation Trust.

=== National Addiction Centre ===
In partnership with the Institute of Psychiatry, Psychology and Neuroscience, King's College London, the Trust runs the National Addiction Centre (NAC), which aims to develop new treatment services for alcohol, smoking and drug problems. This work ranges from trials of new therapies and preventative treatments, to studies seeking to understand the genetic and biological basis of addictive behaviour. An example of research conducted is the Randomised Injecting Opioid Treatment Trial (RIOTT).

== Centre for Mental Health Research and Innovation ==
The Trust, together with the Institute of Psychiatry, Psychology and Neuroscience (IoPPN) at King’s College London, and COMPASS Pathways have created a Centre for Mental Health Research and Innovation to accelerate research of emerging psychedelic therapies, support therapist training and prototype digital technologies to enable personalised, predictive and preventive care models.

== Media ==
The services provided by the Trust feature in a four-part observational television documentary to be broadcast on Channel Four in Autumn 2013. Produced by the makers of 24 Hours in A&E, Bedlam focuses on the work of the Anxiety Disorders Residential Unit at Bethlem Royal Hospital, the Triage ward at Lambeth Hospital, adult community mental health services in Lewisham and services for people over the age of 65.

== See also ==
- Bethlem Gallery
- Healthcare in London
- King's Health Partners
- King's College Hospital
- Guy's Hospital
- St Thomas' Hospital
- List of NHS trusts
