= King's Health Partners =

Geography
- Location: London, United Kingdom

Organisation
- Care system: NHS
- Type: Academic health science centre

History
- Founded: 2009 (London)

Links
- Website: www.kingshealthpartners.org
- Lists: Hospitals in the United Kingdom

King's Health Partners is an academic health science centre located in London, United Kingdom. It comprises King's College London, Guy's and St Thomas' NHS Foundation Trust, King's College Hospital NHS Foundation Trust and South London and Maudsley NHS Foundation Trust.

King's Health Partners' member organisations have a combined annual turnover of around £3.7 billion, treat over 4.8 million patients each year, employ approximately 40,000 staff and teach nearly 30,000 students. It forms one of the largest centres for healthcare education in Europe.

== History ==
The four partners announced their intention to form an academic health science centre in April 2008. On 9 March 2009 the UK Department of Health announced that King's Health Partners would be one of six academic health science centres established in England.

== Research ==
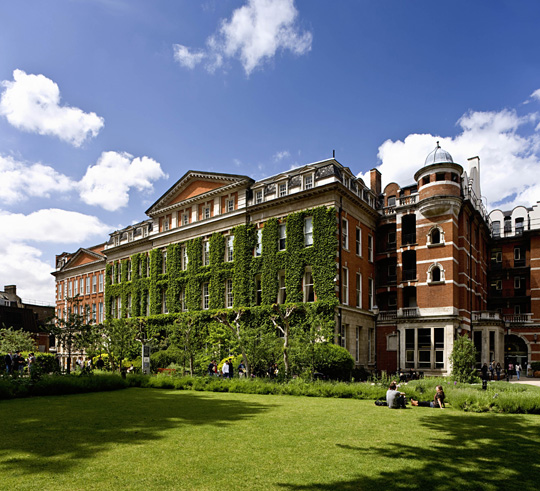
The Guy's campus of King's College London

King's Health Partners incorporates some Medical Research Council centres, including the following:

- MRC-Asthma UK Centre in Allergic Mechanisms of Asthma
- MRC Centre for Developmental Neurobiology
- MRC Centre for Neurodegenerative Research
- MRC Centre for Social Genetic and Developmental Psychiatry
- MRC Centre for Transplantation
- MRC-HPA Centre for Environment and Health (awarded in 2009 in collaboration with Imperial College London)
- MRC National Institute for Medical Research (MRC NIMR) including the MRC Biomedical NMR Centre (planned to move to the new Francis Crick Institute in 2015, a partnership between the MRC, Cancer Research UK, Imperial College London, King's College London, the Wellcome Trust and University College London).

King's Health Partners' research is focused on the following key programme areas:

- Allergy
- Cancer
- Cardiovascular
- Dental
- Dermatology
- Diabetes
- Inflammation and immunity
- Neuroscience and mental health
- Reproductive health
- Stem cell

== Hospitals ==
Hospitals Gallery
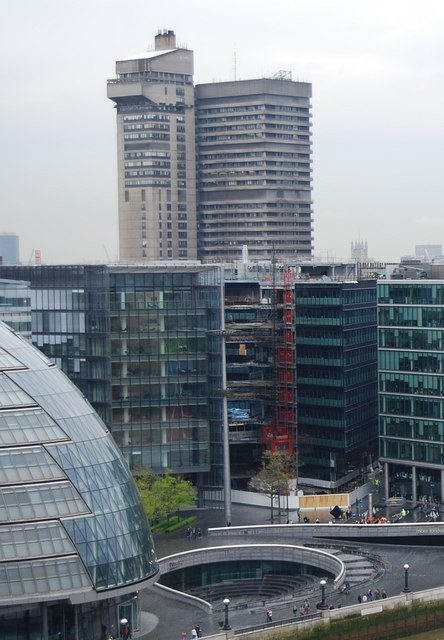
Guy's Hospital

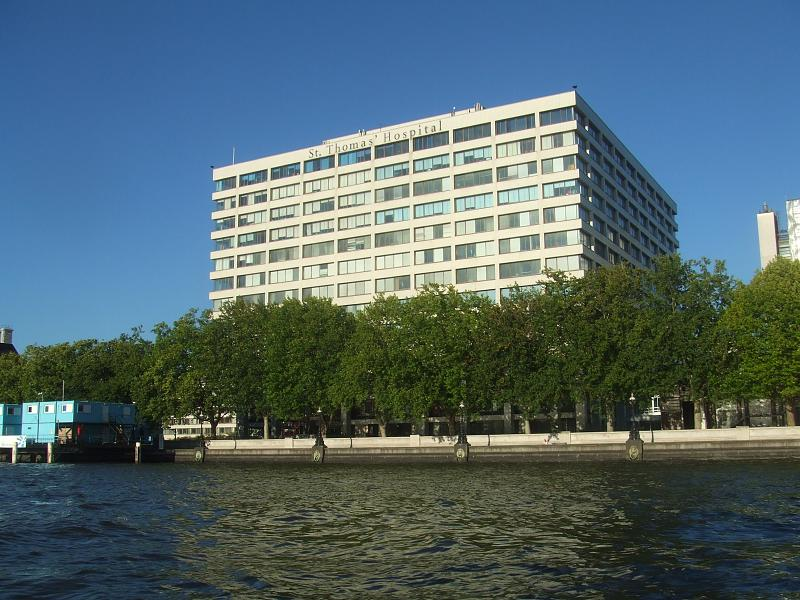
St Thomas' Hospital

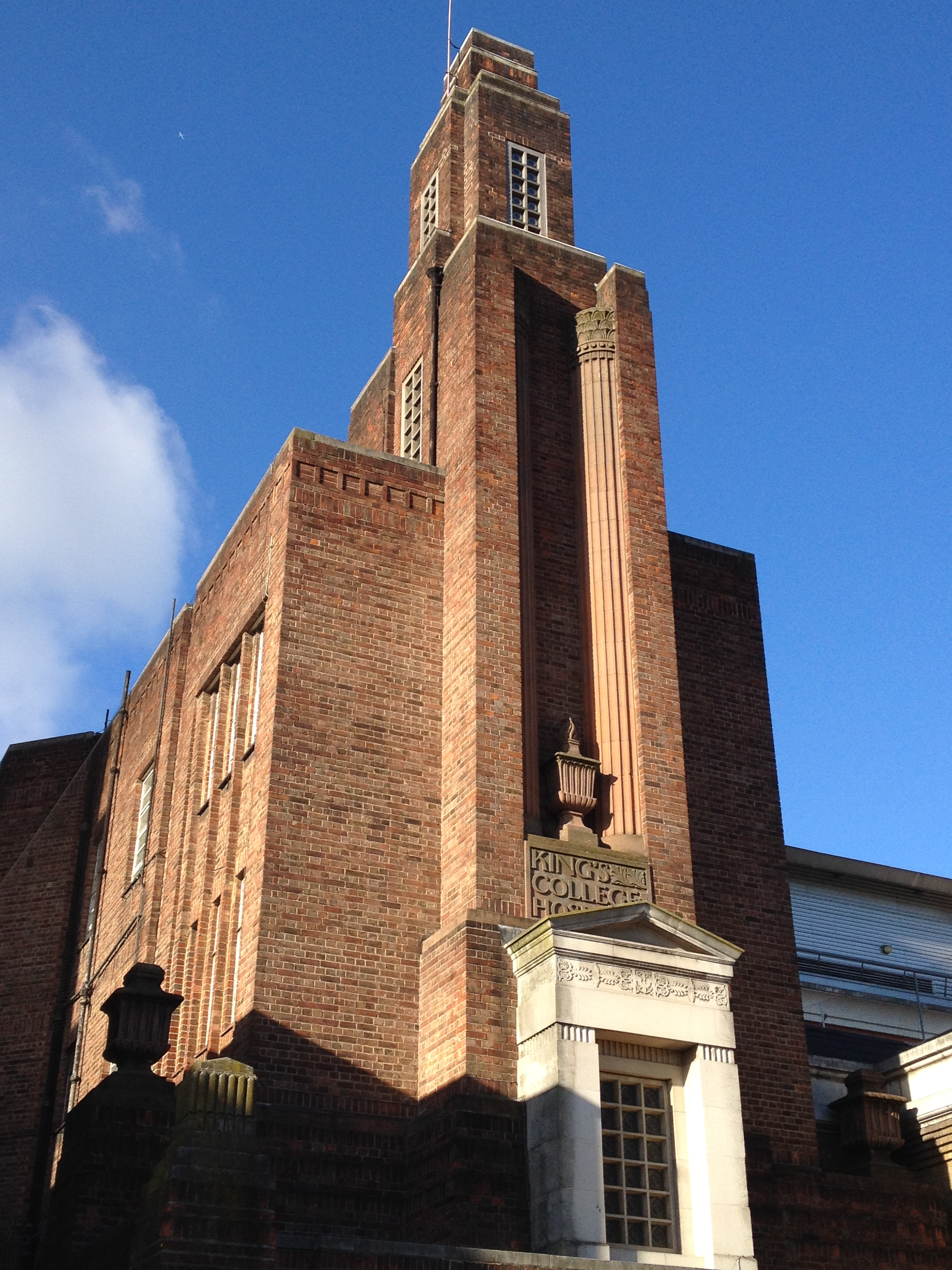
King's College Hospital

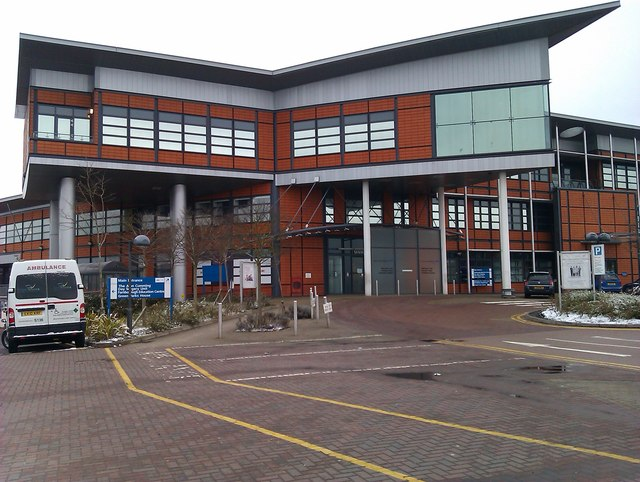
Princess Royal University Hospital

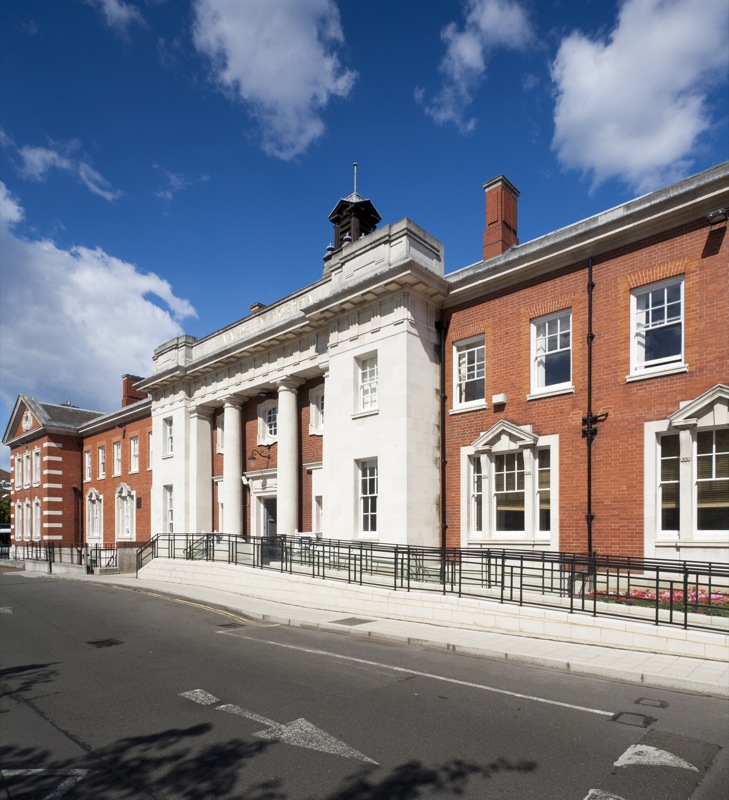
Maudsley Hospital

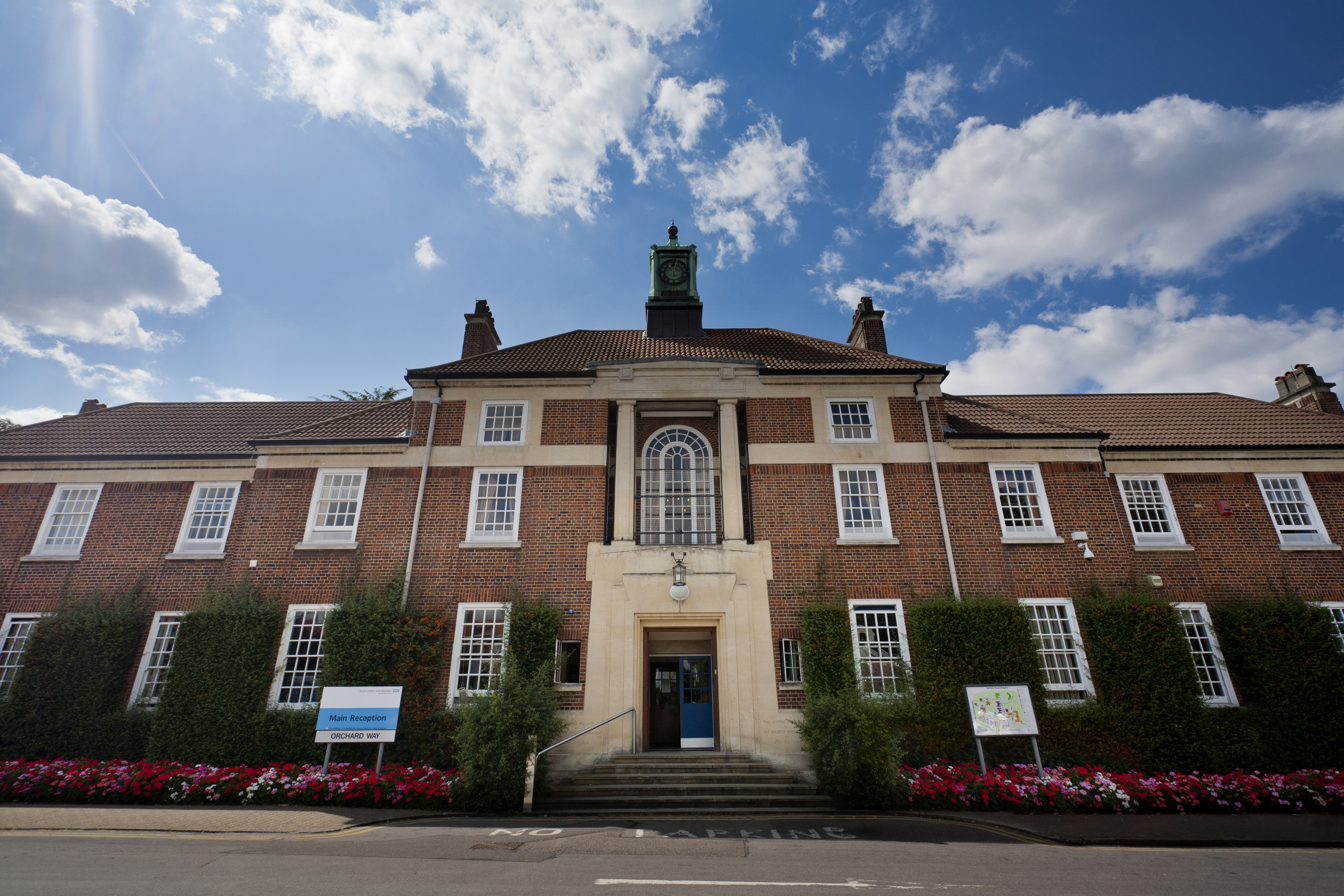
Bethlem Royal Hospital

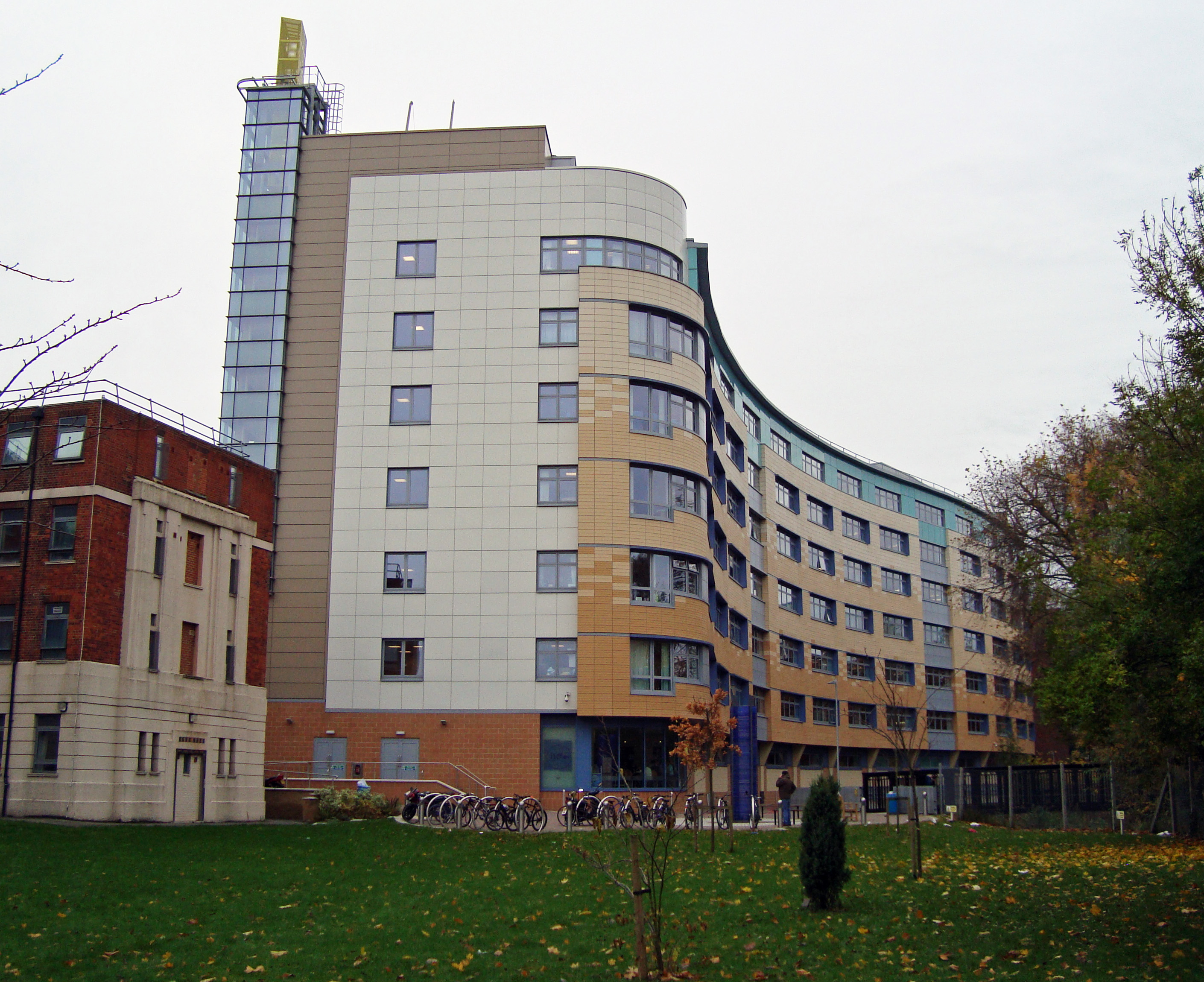
University Hospital Lewisham

== Teaching ==
King's College London GKT School of Medical Education provides core medical education at three King's Health Partners - Guy's Hospital, King's College Hospital and St Thomas' Hospital. King's Health Partners also collaborate with training and provide link education for other allied health professionals from other institutions.
