= Healthcare in London =

Healthcare in London, which consumes about a fifth of the NHS budget in England, is in many respects distinct from that in the rest of the United Kingdom, or England.

== History ==
=== Early history ===
The earliest state hospitals in the UK were set up in London under the management of the Metropolitan Asylums Board which was established by the Metropolitan Poor Act 1867 (30 & 31 Vict. c. 6). They supplemented the pattern of voluntary hospitals which had developed in the case of St Bartholomew's Hospital since 1123. Florence Nightingale campaigned to establish accommodation in infirmaries for the sick separate from that provided by workhouses. She had formulated her schemes for immediate application to London because it was obvious that sweeping reforms could not be absorbed at once throughout the country. In 1860, she proved successful in her campaign and founded, in London, the world's first secular nursing school connected to a fully serving hospital and medical school (St. Thomas' Hospital).

Sanatorium benefit was a particular feature of the National Insurance Act 1911. The Metropolitan Asylums Board had established some 8,500 isolation beds and it was agreed that these beds could be used to meet the obligations of the London County Council. The Board was eventually dissolved in March 1930 as a result of the Local Government Act 1929 and its 24,000 beds transferred to the Council. The Local Government Act permitted, but did not compel, local authorities to take over Poor Law institutions, and to bring some measure of order into an expanded municipal hospital system. This opportunity was exploited by the LCC, which by 1936 had become a stronghold for members of the Socialist Medical Association. Somerville Hastings, President of the SMA, was chairman of the LCC's hospital committee. "The LCC constituted a crucible for experiment, a state within the medical state" which informed the Ministry of Health during the evolution of its thinking on a comprehensive health service. The expansion of health services by the LCC resulted in the maternal death rate per thousand births falling dramatically, from 7.2 in 1932 to 2.49 in 1937 and London under Labour going from well above to below the national average.

=== Patterns of deprivation ===
Attempts to map deprivation in the city date back at least to London Labour and the London Poor in the 1840s, if not to Defoe's A Journal of the Plague Year of 1722. More recently there has been some powerful use of the London Underground as a method of illustration. Life expectancy famously varies, often by several years, between one tube station and the next.

London has the highest rates of childhood obesity of any comparable global city. Healthy eating messages in schools are overwhelmed by the temptations of more than 8,000 fast food outlets – with around 800 more opening every year.

=== Internal market ===
London illustrated the difficulties which would flow from the market model. The 1990 NHS reforms precipitated a crisis in London which necessitated emergency action in the form of the Tomlinson review of London health services. There were severe restrictions on competition. Purchasers were instructed to maintain a "steady state" and the terminology was altered to play down market connotations.

=== Proposals for reorganisation ===
In 1993 the Tomlinson review of London hospitals was published and concluded that there were too many hospitals in central London. It recommended that services should be delivered closer to where people lived and that funds should be made available to raise the standard of GP premises in inner London. Several hospitals were threatened with closure. Although Tomlinson claimed that he had "found an acceptance of the need for change" in fact the proposals were largely rejected.

Frank Dobson commissioned Sir Leslie Turnberg and a panel to undertake a strategic review of health services in the capital in 1997. The report particularly stressed the degree to which primary care in the capital was lagging behind the rest of the country, but the focus of the government continued to be on hospitals.

In December 2006 NHS London asked Lord Darzi to "develop a strategy to meet Londoners' health needs over the next five to ten years". His report Healthcare for London: A Framework for Action was published on 11 July 2007. It recommended the development of academic health science centres and the introduction of more primary services in one place: polyclinics. The plan for moving care from hospitals to GP-led polyclinics was largely thwarted by GP opposition, but his call for trauma, acute stroke and heart attack services to be centralised in specialist units was seen as successful and was widely copied.

In September 2013, Lord Darzi was appointed by the Mayor of London Boris Johnson to lead a review of health and wellbeing and services in London after NHS London was abolished leaving the capital with no strategic direction in health. The Mayor has no formal responsibility for the NHS. The London Health Commission which reported in October 2014 proposed the toughest measures seen in the UK to tackle the "obesity emergency" that leaves one in three 10-year-olds overweight or obese including Ofsted-style ratings highlighting the best and worst schools at promoting healthy eating, and requiring chain restaurants to include "traffic light" calorie warnings on menus. He called for the Mayor to rewrite the London Plan to give borough councils greater protecting in banning takeaways from within 400m of the school gates.

London is submitting proposals for greater local control of the NHS and social care following developments in Manchester.

Capital funding for the Shaping a Healthier Future programme in north west London was turned down by NHS Improvement in November 2017 and in March 2019 Matt Hancock announced that the A&E departments in Charing Cross Hospital and Ealing Hospital would not be downgraded as planned by the Shaping a Healthier Future programme.

== Management structures ==
There have been two main patterns for London's health service planning – the "starfish" with a radial organisation reflecting the transport links and the "doughnut" with the élite hospitals, the cream, in the middle.

— Geoffrey Rivett, National Health Service History

There have been attempts to create authorities across Greater London, but in general the conurbation has been divided into sectors, often extending into the suburbs and rural areas which look to the city for specialist provision. The city was divided into four-quarters in 1946 to establish regional hospital boards and this pattern was repeated with the establishment of regional health authorities in 1974. In each case the regions extended into the home counties. The teaching hospitals, of which a majority were in London, were not integrated into the regional structure until 1974 but reported directly to the minister. To fulfil their teaching responsibilities the 12 undergraduate teaching hospitals needed access to virtually all the beds in inner London.

In 1974 16 area health authorities were established in London, most covering two boroughs. All but two of the primary care trusts in London were co-terminous with the London boroughs. The City of London was combined with Hackney, and Merton and Sutton were combined.

NHS London was established as a strategic health authority in 2006 responsible for the performance of 31 primary care trusts (PCTs), in 6 clusters, 20 acute trusts, three mental health trusts and the London Ambulance Service. A further 16 trusts in London were self-governing foundation trusts. It was abolished in 2013.

In March 2016 five sustainability and transformation plan footprints were established covering the capital:

- North West London led by Dr Mohini Parmar, the Chair of Ealing Clinical Commissioning Group
- North Central London led by David Sloman, the Chief Executive of Royal Free London NHS Foundation Trust
- North East London led by Jane Milligan, the Chief Officer of Tower Hamlets Clinical Commissioning Group. In November 2017 it was announced that she was to be the accountable officer for Waltham Forest, Newham, Tower Hamlets, City and Hackney, Barking and Dagenham, Havering, and Redbridge CCGs.
- South East London led by Amanda Pritchard, the Chief Executive of Guy's and St Thomas' NHS Foundation Trust
- South West London led by Kathryn Magson, the Chief Officer of Richmond Clinical Commissioning Group.

A London Health and Care Devolution Programme Board, chaired by Will Tuckley, chief executive of the London Borough of Tower Hamlets was established in 2017. It includes the 32 clinical commissioning groups across London, 33 local authorities, the Greater London Authority, NHS England London Region and Public Health England London Region. There have been five pilots across London since December 2015 to test how greater collaboration, integration and devolution will work in practice. Plans are to focus on childhood obesity, mental ill-health and health inequalities. The London Health and Care Strategic Partnership Board met in shadow form for the first time in May 2017.

== Commissioning ==
The 32 London clinical commissioning groups agreed to pool 0.15 per cent of their budgets to create a shared fund to make improvements to healthcare across London in April 2015. This is intended to finance 13 programmes:

- develop an urgent and emergency care network across the city;
- address the poorer health outcomes in London for children and young people compared to the rest of the country;
- address the life expectancy gap for people with severe and lasting mental health issues;
- improve early detection of cancer;
- invest in primary care;
- give CCGs greater control over specialised commissioning;
- improve homeless healthcare services.

The CCGs in Westminster, Kensington and Chelsea, Hammersmith and Fulham, Ealing, Harrow, Brent, Hounslow and Hillingdon appointed a common Chief Officer, Mark Easton, in May 2018. This covers the North West London sustainability and transformation partnership area.

The eight CCGs in North West London: Brent; Central London (Westminster); Ealing; Hammersmith and Fulham; Harrow; Hillingdon; Hounslow; and West London, and the six CCGs in south west London: Croydon; Kingston; Merton; Richmond; Sutton; and Wandsworth, are planning to merge into single organisations covering each of their Sustainability and Transformation Partnerships.

== Clinical services ==
=== Primary care ===
The Royal Commission on the National Health Service in 1979 reported on the special difficulties of providing primary care services in London. In 1977 31% of London GPs were single-handed compared with the English average of 16%. 35% of London GP practices had fewer than 2,000 patients compared with the national figure of almost 20%. The Commission considered that teaching hospitals had a responsibility to improve the quality of primary care services in their surrounding areas.

According to Clare Gerada, chair of the London primary care clinical board primary care in London has had "virtually no investment" in over a decade. A third of all GP practices in London are not compliant with the Disability Discrimination Act.

Out-of-hours services are provided by: Grabadoc in Greenwich and Bexley; Partnership of East London Co-operatives (PELC) Limited in Waltham Forest, Barking & Dagenham, Redbridge, and Havering; South East London Doctors' Co-operative (SELDOC) in Sutton, Lambeth, Southwark and Lewisham; Care UK in Kingston, Harrow, Hillingdon, Merton, Islington, Camden and Ealing; KCW Co-operative in Kensington & Chelsea; East Berkshire Primary Care Out Of Hours Services Limited in Richmond; Virgin Care in Croydon; Newham GP Co-operative in Newham; Barts Health NHS Trust in Tower Hamlets; City & Hackney Urgent Healthcare Social Enterprise in the City and Hackney; London Central and West Unscheduled Care Collaborative in Westminster, Ealing, Hounslow, and Hammersmith; Barndoc Healthcare Ltd in Barnet, Enfield, Haringey & Brent; Emdoc and Greenbrook Healthcare in Bromley.

The Londonwide Local Medical Committee which represents GPs in 27 of the 32 London boroughs produced a report for the Health Committee in September 2015 describing a crisis in primary care where "saturation point has been hit even by the most competently working practices in London. General practice in London is beset by blockages in flow, diverting staff from consulting, co-ordinating or planning care, and both reducing access to patients and demotivating professionals".

In August 2018 there were 1,311 GP practices in London.

=== Community services ===
Croydon CCG commissioned a 10-year contract to improve older people's care in Croydon worth £1.8bn in May 2015. It will be delivered by a partnership of Croydon Health Services NHS Trust, South London and Maudsley NHS Foundation Trust, the Croydon GPs Group, which aims to include all the GP practices in the borough, Age UK Croydon, and Croydon Council's adult social care.

=== Secondary care ===
Secondary and Tertiary care in London is provided by a number of local or specialist acute NHS trusts. Below is a list of the main acute trusts in London, and the hospitals which they operate.

Integrated Care System region	NHS Trust	Hospital	Location	Emergency provision	Tertiary specialism	Notes
North Central	Royal Free London NHS Foundation Trust	Royal Free Hospital	Hampstead	24/7 Emergency Dept Heart Attack Centre	Nephrology, Hepatology, Haemotology and Vascular Surgery	
North Central	Royal Free London NHS Foundation Trust	North Middlesex University Hospital	Edmonton	24/7 Emergency Dept	Sickle cell disease	
North Central	Royal Free London NHS Foundation Trust	Barnet Hospital	Barnet	24/7 Emergency Dept		
North Central	Royal Free London NHS Foundation Trust	Chase Farm Hospital	Enfield	Minor Injuries Unit		
North Central	University College London Hospitals NHS Foundation Trust	University College Hospital	Euston	24/7 Emergency Dept Hyperacute Stroke Unit Heart Attack Centre	Neurology and Neurosurgery, Women's Health, Urology	
North Central	Whittington Health NHS Trust	Whittington Hospital	Archway	24/7 Emergency Dept		
North East	Barts Health NHS Trust	Royal London Hospital	Whitechapel	Major Trauma Centre Hyperacute Stroke Unit	Nephrology, Paediatrics, Women's Health, Haemotology, Plastics & Burns	Helipad
North East	Barts Health NHS Trust	Whipps Cross University Hospital	Leytonstone	24/7 Emergency Dept		
North East	Barts Health NHS Trust	Newham University Hospital	Plaistow	24/7 Emergency Dept		
North East	Barts Health NHS Trust	St Bartholemew's Hospital	City of London	Minor Injuries Unit Heart Attack Centre	Cardiology, Oncology, Respiratory	
North East	Barts Health NHS Trust	Mile End Hospital	Mile End			
North East	Barking, Havering and Redbridge University Hospitals NHS Trust	Queen's Hospital	Romford	24/7 Emergency Dept Hyperacute Stroke Unit		Helipad
North East	Barking, Havering and Redbridge University Hospitals NHS Trust	King George Hospital	Ilford	24/7 Emergency Dept		
North East	Homerton Healthcare NHS Foundation Trust	Homerton University Hospital	Homerton	24/7 Emergency Dept	Bariatric surgery	
North West	Imperial College Healthcare NHS Trust	St Mary's Hospital	Paddington	Major Trauma Centre	Cardiology, Orthopaedics	
North West	Imperial College Healthcare NHS Trust	Charing Cross Hospital	Fulham	24/7 Emergency Dept Hyperacute Stroke Unit	Neurosurgery	
North West	Imperial College Healthcare NHS Trust	Hammersmith Hospital	White City	Minor Injuries Unit Heart Attack Centre	Nephrology (transplant), Haemotology, Cardiology	Co-located with Queen Charlotte's and Chelsea Maternity Hospital
North West	London North West University Healthcare NHS Trust	Northwick Park Hospital	Harrow	24/7 Emergency Dept Hyperacute Stroke Unit		
North West	London North West University Healthcare NHS Trust	Ealing Hospital	Southall	24/7 Emergency Dept		
North West	London North West University Healthcare NHS Trust	Central Middlesex Hospital	Park Royal	Minor Injuries Unit	Sickle Cell disease	
North West	Chelsea and Westminster Hospital NHS Foundation Trust	Chelsea and Westminster Hospital	Chelsea	24/7 Emergency Dept	Plastics & Burns, HIV and sexual health	
North West	Chelsea and Westminster Hospital NHS Foundation Trust	West MIddlesex University Hospital	Isleworth	24/7 Emergency Dept		
North West	Hillingdon Hospitals NHS Foundation Trust	Hillingdon Hospital	Hillingdon	24/7 Emergency Dept		Receiving hospital for medical emergencies at Heathrow
North West	Hillingdon Hospitals NHS Foundation Trust	Mount Vernon Hospital	Northwood	Minor Injuries Unit		
South East	King's College Hospital NHS Foundation Trust	King's College Hospital	Denmark Hill	Major Trauma Centre Hyperacute Stroke Unit Heart Attack Centre	Hepatology (liver and pancreatic islet transplant), Neurology, Haemo-oncology, Fetal medicine,	Helipad
South East	King's College Hospital NHS Foundation Trust	Princess Royal University Hospital	Farnborough	24/7 Emergency Dept Hyperacute Stroke Unit		
South East	King's College Hospital NHS Foundation Trust	Orpington Hospital	Orpington			
South East	Guy's and St Thomas' NHS Foundation Trust	St Thomas' Hospital and the Evelina London Children's Hospital	Lambeth	24/7 Emergency Dept Heart Attack Centre	Paediatric oncology, Cardiology	
South East	Guy's and St Thomas' NHS Foundation Trust	Guy's Hospital	Borough	Minor Injuries Unit	Nephrology (transplant), pancreatic transplant, dermatology	
South East	Guy's and St Thomas' NHS Foundation Trust	Harefield Hospital	Harefield	Heart Attack Centre	Cardiothoracic medicine (inc Heart and Lung transplants)	Helipad
South East	Guy's and St Thomas' NHS Foundation Trust	Royal Brompton Hospital	Chelsea		Cardiothoracic medicine	
South East	Lewisham and Greenwich NHS Trust	University Hospital Lewisham	Lewisham	24/7 Emergency Dept		
South East	Lewisham and Greenwich NHS Trust	Queen Elizabeth Hospital	Greenwich	24/7 Emergency Dept		
South West	St George's University Hospitals NHS Foundation Trust	St George's Hospital	Tooting	Major Trauma Centre Hyperacute Stroke Unit Heart Attack Centre	Nephrology (inc transplant), bone marrow transplant, Neurology, Oncology, Cardiology	Helipad
South West	St George's University Hospitals NHS Foundation Trust	Queen Mary's Hospital	Roehampton	Minor Injuries Unit		
South West	Croydon Health Services NHS Trust	Croydon University Hospital	Croydon	24/7 Emergency Dept		
South West	Epsom and St Helier University Hospitals NHS Trust	Epsom Hospital	Epsom	24/7 Emergency Dept		
South West	Epsom and St Helier University Hospitals NHS Trust	St Helier Hospital	Sutton	24/7 Emergency Dept		
South West	Kingston and Richmond NHS Foundation Trust	Kingston Hospital	Kingston	24/7 Emergency Dept	Oncology	
South West	Kingston and Richmond NHS Foundation Trust	Teddington Memorial Hospital	Teddington	Minor Injuries Unit		

GPs have been asked to reduce the number of patients they refer to consultants to cut costs. Patients should be sent to local hospitals with long waiting times rather than to specialist hospitals with expertise treating their conditions. Patients seeing more than one consultant may have the number of consultants they see reduced. Doctors are asked to find alternative ways of treating patients. Andy Slaughter MP said this amounted to rationing, Slaughter added, “GPs are being told not to refer patients to consultants unless absolutely necessary and then only to those at the local hospital trust where waiting times could run to six months or more. The restrictions on consultant-to-consultant referrals will hit those with the most complex and difficult conditions hardest.” Martin Marshall of the Royal College of GPs said, “GPs are keen to work with CCGs but what is paramount is that any initiatives do not lower the standard of care that patients receive … it is important that GPs do not feel under pressure not to refer against their expert judgement on the basis of cost, or because they are concerned they will be penalised in some way.” There is concern this cost saving measure may be extended beyond London.

A tender for a centralised pathology service to serve Guy's and St Thomas' NHS Foundation Trust, King's College Hospital NHS Foundation Trust, South London and Maudsley NHS Foundation Trust, Oxleas NHS Foundation Trust and Royal Brompton and Harefield NHS Foundation Trust for 15 years was won by Synlab Group in January 2020.

There is a 14.8% vacancy rate for nurses in London, the highest in the country. Acute hospitals and mental health care are particularly short of nurses. Austerity is blamed.

Patients in London who suffered stroke were found to be much more likely to get thrombectomy in 2022 than those in other parts of England. 42% of thrombectomy units only operated during office hours and Monday to Friday, largely due to a shortage of interventional neuroradiologists.

=== Mental health services ===
Barnet, Enfield and Haringey Mental Health NHS Trust, Central and North West London NHS Foundation Trust, North East London NHS Foundation Trust, East London NHS Foundation Trust and West London Mental Health NHS Trust established the North London Forensic Consortium in April 2018. It plans to bring back half of the 110 forensic patients currently out of the area and set up a new joint bed management system to stop more patients being sent out of the area when a local bed is not available. It has responsibility for a specialised commissioning budget of £113 million and about 700 forensic mental health beds.

== See also ==
- Category:Health in London
- Healthcare in the United Kingdom
