= Tim Smart (businessman) =

British businessman

- Education: Birmingham University
- Occupations: Businessman, healthcare manager

Tim Smart is a British businessman and, from May to September 2016, was the Chairman of Southern Health NHS Foundation Trust. He was Chief Executive of King's College Hospital NHS Foundation Trust from 2008 to November 2015.

== Education ==
Smart graduated from Birmingham University with a BSocSc degree in Economics in 1979.

== Other work ==
Before joining the NHS, Smart had a thirty-year career in the commercial sector, first with Shell and then with BT. Prior to his appointment at King's, Smart was Managing Director of BT Global Services UK. Smart was responsible for all of BT Global's business with the UK government and large enterprises in the UK, including the NHS. Smart has worked in the Middle East, the Netherlands and the United States. He was a non-executive director of a US-listed financial services company. He has been a Trustee of two national charities. Smart is an elected member of the Foundation Trust Network Board.

== King's College Hospital NHS Foundation Trust ==
Smart was appointed Chief Executive of King's College Hospital NHS Foundation Trust in November 2008. While he was Chief Executive the Trust took over responsibility for the Princess Royal University Hospital and Orpington Hospital, as well as responsibility for running some clinical services at Queen Mary's Hospital, Sidcup, Beckenham Beacon and Sevenoaks Hospital. Smart established KCH Commercial Services as the Trust's commercial arm. Work started on a new helipad at the Trust while Smart was in charge, to help in major trauma cases. The Trust serves a population of over 700,000 and has over 6,000 employees. It is one of London's largest teaching hospitals, providing healthcare to three London boroughs as well a range of specialist services for patients across southeast England. The trust plays a key role in the training and education of medical, nursing and dental students, and is recognised for its work in blood cancers, stroke and major trauma, cardiac services, liver disease and transplantation, foetal medicine, and neurosciences. Smart was the 14th highest paid NHS manager in the UK in 2011, and so was one of the at least 660 NHS managers who earned more than the UK Prime Minister.
