= Synnovis =

British pathology company

Synnovis, formerly GSTS Pathology and Viapath, is a London-based provider of pathology services. It is a partnership between Guy's and St Thomas' NHS Foundation Trust, King's College Hospital NHS Foundation Trust, and SYNLAB UK & Ireland.

== Services ==
Synnovis provides pathology services to the Princess Royal University Hospital, Guy's, St Thomas' and King's College hospitals. The laboratories are accredited with the ISO 15189 medical laboratory standard and are listed by UKAS.

== History ==
Synnovis was established under the name of GSTS Pathology in 2009 as a partnership with Serco. It was founded in response to the recommendations in the "Report of the Review of NHS Pathology Services in England" chaired by Lord Carter of Coles, published in 2006. GSTS Pathology posted a £5.9 million loss in 2011 but a £3.8m net profit for the year ending December 2013, up from £300,000 in 2012. Income increased by 6% from £87.6m in 2012 to £92.5m in 2013. In 2014 the majority-owned NHS joint venture rebranded itself Viapath when it merged with Kingspath.

In January 2014, Viapath began operating as three different entities: Viapath Group, Viapath Analytics and Viapath Services. Viapath Group enables the provision of an end-to-end pathology service including laboratory testing services, laboratory facilities and equipment, logistics, IT and corporate support services.

In February 2016, Dr. David Bennett, former head of NHS Foundation Trust regulator Monitor, was appointed the new chair of Viapath. In July 2016, Prof. Dominic Harrington won the 'Academy for Healthcare Science award for innovation' at the Advancing Healthcare Awards. He was recognised for his achievement in creating Viapath’s Innovation Academy.

In 2016, response to the government's new Apprenticeship Levy scheme, Viapath partnered with 3aaa Apprenticeships to train apprentices under Viapath's new VIAcademy scheme.

In 2018, in conjunction with the Academy of Healthcare Science, the "Viapath Award For Innovation In Healthcare Science" was created, a category that was open to all UK healthcare scientists. The winners were Jonathan Ashmore and Cormac McGrath, clinical scientists from NHS Highlands and Belfast Health and Social Care Trust for their work on developing an MRI virtual reality app.

Following successful trials, in 2018, Viapath agreed to implement diagnostics.ai's technology into Viapath's South London Specialist Virology Centre at King's College Hospital. This technology automates the analysis and reporting of results.

When the company lost its bid for a renewal of the 15-year contract, the Guy's and St. Thomas' and King's College trusts bought out Serco's share.

The Synnovis brand was launched in October 2022.

== Ransomware attack ==
On 3 June 2024 Synnovis succumbed to a computer ransomware attack compromising patient and clinician confidential data and disrupting NHS services. The National Cyber Security Centre released some details in a report on the attack.

== Criticism ==
=== NHS overcharging ===
Internal documents leaked to Corporate Watch in August 2014 indicate that the company overcharged the NHS for diagnostic tests. A 2013 internal audit by Guy's into three of the 15 laboratories run by Viapath found its invoicing and billing systems were "unreliable" and contained "material inaccuracies", amounting to an overcharge of £283,561 over a sample three-month period. A variety of complaints by clinicians were recorded, centring on a policy of employing staff who were less experienced and less expensive. In a review of its first four years, marked "strictly confidential", Chief Executive Richard Jones admitted that it had "achieved much less than hoped" and that "initial attempts at transformation were badly handled and ended up costing money rather than saving it".

=== Inaccurate and delayed results ===
In 2025 there was criticism of the public-private partnership Synnovis for delivering unreliable results in their £2 billion contract to deliver blood-testing services for NHS hospitals and GPs. Inaccurate results, even though sometimes flagged as inaccurate, led to patients being referred to hospital for unnecessary further tests and diagnosis as a precaution. A GP said anonymously to the BBC "It would [previously] never cross our minds that a blood test might not be reliable. This is now an everyday concern. ... The current problems with Synnovis are nothing short of a national scandal". There were also delays that prevented timely tests being carried out. The problems do not stem from the June 2024 cyber-attack—Synnovis apologised for a backlog of 70,000 test results earlier in 2024.
