= Purley War Memorial Hospital =

Community hospital in Purley, England

- Croydon Health Services NHS Trust
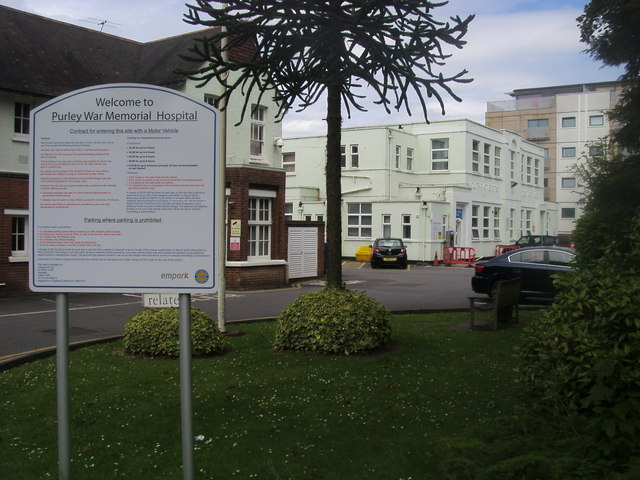
- The hospital as viewed from the entrance road.

- Shown in Greater London

Geography
- Location: 856 Brighton Road, Purley, Croydon, England
- Coordinates: 51.3402°N 0.1145°W

Organisation
- Care system: Public (NHS)
- Type: Community

Services
- Emergency department: No, but Minor Injuries Unit

History
- Former names: Purley & District Cottage Hospital
- Constructed: 1906
- Opened: 1909

Links
- Website: NHS - Purley War Memorial Hospital

Purley War Memorial Hospital is a community hospital in Purley, England. It is managed by Croydon Health Services NHS Trust.

== History ==
The Purley and District Cottage Hospital was constructed on the site between 1906 and 1909, when it was officially opened by Princess Helena. The original hospital building was based on an old private home, and had 8 hospital beds. The British Red Cross opened a building on the site in 1919 as a Curative Post for ex-servicemen from the First World War, which by 1927 would become the hospital's outpatients department. Following the end of the war, the site was upgraded and reopened in 1922 as the Purley and District War Memorial Hospital with a total of 22 hospital beds. Further expansions were curtailed by the outbreak of the Second World War, although a new Outpatients Department was constructed in 1940 so it could act as a First Aid Post for the local Civil Defence group.

Following the war, the hospital joined the National Health Service upon its creation in 1948 and continued to expand, housing 55 beds in 1962 as well as a Physiotherapy Department, and an X-Ray Department, and a Casualty Department which continued to operate until 1989. However, by 1984 the hospital was designated a geriatric hospital and no longer had acute beds. In 1996, the hospital became part of the newly formed Mayday Healthcare NHS Trust (merged in 2010 into the current Croydon Health Services NHS Trust) and closed all its wards in 2004, following the completion of the Jubilee Wing at the larger Mayday Hospital (now Croydon University Hospital) in the north of the borough.

In 2012, Croydon Health Services NHS Trust announced a refurbishment of the hospital, including the long disused wards at the rear of the grounds. The refurbishment cost £11.5 million and the hospital reopened to the public in July 2013.

== Facilities ==
=== Croydon Health Services ===
The refurbished hospital continues to provide various outpatient services, including breast cancer screening, diabetic medicine clinics, and community midwifery services. The new site also contains an expanded imaging service, offering ultrasound, X-ray and DEXA scanning services.

In 2017, the Minor Injuries Unit at the hospital was converted into a "GP Hub", which is able to provide same-day GP appointments to those who cannot get one at their registered practice, as well as continuing to accept walk-ins for minor illnesses and injuries.

In 2022, the Purley Elective Centre opened as a surgical hub for low complexity surgical procedures, such as some hand surgery or gynaecological procedures. Similarly, in 2024, the Purley Community Diagnostic Centre was opened to provide better access to diagnostic testing, such as imaging and blood testing. Both of these were part of larger government schemes designed to help clear the waiting list backlogs for procedures following the COVID-19 pandemic in England.

=== Moorfields Eye Hospital ===
Moorfields Eye Hospital NHS Foundation Trust run a community eye clinic out of the hospital, focusing on diagnosis and outpatient management of retinal disease and glaucoma. More involved care, including eye surgery, is conducted at the Moorfields Eye Centre at Croydon University Hospital.

=== Keston Medical Practice ===
The hospital is one of the sites of the Keston and Moorings Medical Practice, part of the KMP Primary Care Network. The practice moved there in 2014 after vacating their previous surgery on Lansdowne Road.

== See also ==
- Healthcare in London
