= Virtualstock =

British e-commerce company

- Industry: E-commerce
- Founded: 2004; 21 years ago on Fulham Road, London, England
- Founders: Ed Bradley; Tim Ingham
- Key people: Chairman and CEO: Rene Schuster

Virtualstock is a British e-commerce company based in Reading, Berkshire. It was on established on Fulham Road in 2004 by Ed Bradley and Tim Ingham. Their software is used as a supply chain platform by John Lewis & Partners, B&Q and Argos, extending their product ranges online.

Rene Schuster, formerly of Telefónica Germany is the Chairman and CEO. He was appointed Chairman in 2018, when the company raised £3.42 million from the Enterprise Investment Scheme and was appointed CEO the following year.

NHS Shared Business Services uses its Edge4Health e-procurement platform as an extension to the NHS Supply Chain. In May 2020 it was used by 140 of the 240 English NHS trusts. It displays over 7,00,000 products from more than 5,000 suppliers. The COVID-19 pandemic in the United Kingdom saw an increase in use of the platform as it was used to source products from alternative suppliers. The platform was fully integrated across 20 trusts before the pandemic, including several Shelford Group members. Guy's and St Thomas' NHS Foundation Trust has been using it since 2015.

It handled £105 million of healthcare spend with a throughput of 170,000 healthcare products between February and April 2020.

It established a directory called Framespan for NHS purchasing in 2022. It includes all the NHS framework agreements.
