= Lennox Broster =

South African–British surgeon (1889–1965)

Lennox Ross Broster
- Born: 1889; South Africa
- Died: 12 April 1965 (aged 75–76)
- Medical career
- Profession: Surgeon
- Field: Endocrinology; General surgery
- Institutions: Charing Cross Hospital
- Sub-specialties: Congenital adrenal hyperplasia; Intersexuality

Lennox Ross Broster, OBE (1889 – 12 April 1965) was a South African-born surgeon who spent most of his career as a consultant at Charing Cross Hospital, London. He served with the Royal Army Medical Corps during World War I, for which he was made an Officer of the Order of the British Empire.

After the war he specialised in the treatment of endocrine disease and took a particular interest in congenital adrenal hyperplasia, leading him to devise a new technique for surgical removal of the adrenal gland. In the 1930s and 1940s Broster was among the first surgeons to operate routinely on intersex patients, in work that received frequent coverage in the British press and helped to establish Charing Cross Hospital as a centre for intersex and transgender medicine. His patients during this period included the Olympic athlete Mark Weston, who was an intersex trans man.

Broster was a longtime member of the British Medical Association's Council and a chairman of the Commonwealth Medical Advisory Bureau's committee of management. With Raymond Greene, he was instrumental in the establishment of the Section of Endocrinology of the Royal Society of Medicine.

== Early life and war service ==
Broster was born in South Africa in 1889, the son of Charles John Broster. He was educated in Grahamstown, first at St. Andrew's College, then at Rhodes University College. In 1909 Broster received a Rhodes Scholarship and began studying medicine at Trinity College, Oxford. He continued his medical training at Guy's Hospital, graduating as Bachelor of Medicine, Bachelor of Surgery in 1914.

During World War I Broster served in the Royal Army Medical Corps, initially with the 44th Field Ambulance and later as Deputy Assistant Director of Medical Services for the Tank Corps. He was made a lieutenant on 10 February 1915, then promoted to captain on 10 February 1916 and major on 25 February 1918. On two occasions Broster was mentioned in dispatches. Broster relinquished his command on 11 February 1919.

Broster was made an Officer of the Order of the British Empire (OBE) in the 1919 Birthday Honours.

After the war, Broster completed his medical education. He received the degree of Doctor of Medicine in 1919. In 1921 he became a Fellow of the Royal College of Surgeons of England. In 1922 he qualified as Master of Surgery.

== Surgical career ==
=== Positions ===
Broster held junior surgical positions at a number of hospitals, including those of house-surgeon at the Radcliffe Infirmary and surgical officer to out-patients at Guy's Hospital. He also worked at the Queen's Hospital for Children, as an assistant surgeon beginning in 1922 and a full surgeon from 1927 to 1930.

It was also during this period that Broster became associated with the hospital where he would remain for the rest of his career, Charing Cross Hospital in London. His first position at Charing Cross was as a surgical registrar, and he became an assistant surgeon there during the 1920s. (Note: This date is given as 1923 in Broster's obituary in the British Medical Journal but as 1928 by Medvei. Another source states that Broster was still a registrar at Charing Cross Hospital in 1924.) In 1933 became a full surgeon at the hospital, and he remained there as a consultant for the rest of his career. A history of Charing Cross published in 1967 stated that Broster had been "one of the outstanding surgeons" there. Although employed as a General Surgeon, he took a special interest in endocrinology.

Simultaneously with his work at Charing Cross, Broster also served as a consultant to several other hospitals – the Bute Hospital in Luton, Chesham Cottage Hospital, Dunstable Hospital, Beckenham Hospital – and to the Church Army.

=== Adrenal surgery and work with intersex patients ===
In 1927 a colleague at Charing Cross Hospital, the neurologist Gordon Holmes, received a fifteen-year-old female patient experiencing virilisation. Holmes was familiar with a similar case that had been treated by surgical removal of an adrenocortical adenoma (a tumour of the adrenal cortex), and he asked Broster to operate on the new patient. Removal of the larger adrenal gland (an adrenalectomy) revealed the cause of its enlargement was not a tumour but hyperplasia. This case prompted Broster and his colleagues to begin research and treatment of cases of adrenal hyperplasia that affected sexual development. The condition was known at the time as "adreno-genital syndrome", although the term now used is congenital adrenal hyperplasia.

As part of this work, Broster devised a new method for adrenalectomy which he reported in a 1932 paper. At the time, operations of this type often involved resection of a rib so that the surgeon could gain access to the adrenal gland. In Broster's less destructive technique, a long, oblique incision was made over the rib that covered the adrenal gland and the rib was fractured, allowing the incision to be continued through the parietal pleura. The diaphragm was then divided, giving access to the gland.

In the 1930s and 1940s Broster not only continued to work on congenital adrenal hyperplasia, but also provided surgical and hormonal treatment to intersex patients more generally, in collaboration with the psychiatrist Clifford Allen. This attracted considerable press attention to Broster and Charing Cross during the 1930s; a 1938 story in the News of the World described Broster as "the famous surgeon, who has brought new hope and happiness into the baffled lives of many men and women who were desirous of changing their sex". Although journalists often described the treatment as sex changing (as in the preceding quotation), the patients they wrote about would more accurately be described as intersex rather than transsexual, and there is no evidence that Broster operated on transsexuals.

Broster's most famous patient was the athlete Mark Weston, who was originally named Mary Louise Edith Weston and raised as a girl. Weston competed as a woman in the British javelin championship and the Olympic Games, but came to identify himself as a man. In 1936 it was reported that he had received two operations at Charing Cross Hospital from Broster, who stated "that Mark Weston, who has always been brought up as a female, is a male and should continue to live as such".

World War II interrupted the work of Broster's team, but he used the additional time available to write his book Endocrine Man (1944), which he intended to present his research to laypeople in the belief that "looming on the horizon are issues fraught with important consequences that will require the finest weaving in the fabric of our social structure". In the 1950s Broster's work was taken up by John Randell, another surgeon at Charing Cross Hospital, who provided sex reassignment surgery to several hundred transsexuals during his career.

=== Lectures and teaching ===
The Royal College of Surgeons of England elected Broster as a Hunterian Professor for 1934, and he fulfilled this role with a lecture on "Surgery of the Adrenal". He also lectured on the adrenal gland during tours of the United States and Canada in 1936 and 1937. Broster's 1941 lectures on war surgery to the American Surgical Association prompted the Columbia Medical Centre of New York to make a donation of surgical instruments to Charing Cross Hospital, and he became an honorary fellow of the Association in 1942. In 1948 the South African Medical Association invited him to lecture in South Africa, and in 1950 he was a visiting professor of surgery at Cairo University.

Broster was chairman of the court of examiners of the Royal College of Surgeons of England and also acted as an examiner for the Universities of Oxford, Cambridge and Leeds.

=== Contribution to professional organisations ===
Broster represented the South African branches of the British Medical Association (BMA) on the BMA's Council from 1938 until 1945–1946, when the independent Medical Association of South Africa was established. In 1954 the Medical Association of South Africa awarded him its Bronze Medal for his services to the South African medical profession. Broster was also involved with the BMA's Section of Surgery, serving as an honorary secretary in 1929 and a vice-president in 1950.

Broster supported Raymond Greene's efforts in the mid-1940s to establish a Section of Endocrinology of the Royal Society of Medicine and made the case to the Society's Council. Greene and Broster had to contend with opposition to the creation of a new medical specialism and with doubts about the scientific basis of endocrinology. According to the endocrinologist P. M. F. Bishop, it was "almost entirely due to these two enthusiastic pioneers" that the Section was established in January 1946. Broster became one of the Section's two vice-presidents and then president after the death of the post's initial holder, Walter Langdon-Brown.

In 1950 Broster became chairman of the Commonwealth Medical Advisory Bureau's committee of management. In 1952 he became chair of a committee, set up jointly by the Royal Society of Medicine's Section of Endocrinology and the Society for Endocrinology, which had the task of considering how British research in endocrinology could be encouraged. He was elected an honorary fellow of the Royal Society of Medicine in 1958.

== Family ==
Lennox Broster married Edith M. V. Thomas in 1916, and the couple had three daughters. Their eldest daughter Cynthia also became a physician and finished her career as principal medical officer for the Oxfordshire Area Health Authority. She married the neurologist Charles Phillips in 1942. When Charles was called up for military service the same year, Lennox provided a recommendation that led to Charles's appointment to the Royal Army Medical Corps.

== Personal life ==
Friends described Broster as patriotic and a strong supporter of the Commonwealth of Nations. He wrote to The Times in 1956 commending "British contributions to the Commonwealth and Empire, especially in tropical medicine".

Broster won a Rugby Blue at Oxford in 1912 and 1913 and continued to play during his medical career, serving as President of the United Hospitals Rugby Football Club. In addition, he played golf and retained an interest in sports contests between Oxford and other universities.

== Stroke and death ==
Broster suffered a stroke after retiring from Charing Cross Hospital, when about to sit down at Lord's Cricket Ground to watch a match. Although at first he lost the ability to speak or control his right leg, he made a partial recovery. Broster died on 12 April 1965.
