= Phil Bates (disambiguation) =

Phil Bates (born 1953) is an English musician

Phil Bates may also refer to:

- Phil Bates (footballer) (1897–1974), English footballer
- Phil Bates (gridiron football) (born 1989), American football wide receiver
- Phil Bates (jazz musician) (1931–2007), English jazz double bassist
