= Royal Hospital, Wolverhampton =

- Royal Wolverhampton NHS Trust
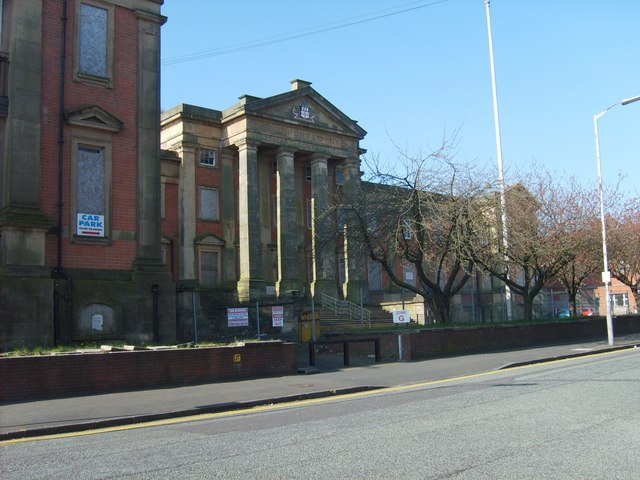
- The Royal Hospital, Wolverhampton

- Location in West Midlands

Geography
- Location: Wolverhampton, West Midlands, England, United Kingdom
- Coordinates: 52.58128°N 2.12053°W

Organisation
- Care system: Public NHS
- Type: Acute general hospital

History
- Founded: 1846
- Closed: 1997

Links
- Lists: Hospitals in England

The Royal Hospital, Wolverhampton was an acute general hospital in the All Saints inner city area of Wolverhampton.

== History ==
The hospital was designed by Edward Banks in the classical style and built between 1846 and 1849 on land acquired from the Henry Vane, 2nd Duke of Cleveland. It was opened as the South Staffordshire Hospital but became the Wolverhampton and Staffordshire General Hospital in the second half of the 19th century. The internal layout rapidly became outdated when the pavilion system, where patients were separated by type of illness, was introduced at new hospitals in 1852. Additions included a new wing for in-patients as well as a new block for out-patients in 1872, a fever ward in 1873, a medical library in 1877, an additional two-storey in-patient wing in 1912 and the vast King Edward VII Memorial Wing in 1923. It was renamed the Royal Hospital, Wolverhampton in December 1928. A further block of in-patient wards was completed in the late 1930s.

The hospital closed in June 1997 with services being transferred to New Cross Hospital; the site was acquired for retail development by Tesco in 2001, but the development stalled in January 2015 and the site was later sold to the Homes and Communities Agency for residential development in March 2016.

== Notable staff ==
- Henrietta Hannath (1864–1939) was matron of the Royal Hospital, Wolverhampton from 1906 to 1923. She trained at King's College Hospital, London, worked at The London Hospital under Eva Luckes as a Home Sister, and also taught Sick Cookery to the nursing staff. During the First World War, Hannath was posted as matron of the 5th Northern General Hospital, Leicester, and returned to Wolverhampton in 1919. She received her RRC in 1917, and was awarded a bar in 1920. Hannath retired as Matron in the Territorial Army Nursing Service in 1923. She was a founder member of the College of Nursing, the forerunner to the Royal College of Nursing.

== Notable patients ==
- Percy Thrower (1913-1988), gardener and broadcaster, died at the hospital.
