= NHS Haringey =

NHS Haringey, formerly Haringey Teaching Primary Care Trust, is the regional authority of the National Health Service (England) responsible for providing and commissioning healthcare services for the population of the London Borough of Haringey.

NHS Haringey provides healthcare to anyone normally resident in the borough with most services free at the point of use for the patient though there are charges associated with eye tests, dental care, prescriptions, and many aspects of personal care. The National Health Service (England) has agreed a formal constitution which sets out the legal rights and responsibilities of the NHS, its staff, and users of the service and makes additional non-binding pledges regarding many key aspects of its operations.

NHS Haringey is largely funded by general taxation (including a proportion from National Insurance payments). The UK government department responsible for the NHS is the Department of Health, headed by the Secretary of State for Health. Most of the expenditure of The Department of Health (£98.7 billion in 2008–9) is spent on the NHS.

NHS Haringey works in partnership with Haringey Council, other public and private organisations, the voluntary and community sector and local people to provide person-centred, high-quality and accessible local health services for everyone in Haringey.

London Borough of Haringey has a diverse population of approximately 224,000 people. Almost a quarter of local people are aged 18 or under and almost half are from black and minority ethnic groups. There are over 190 different languages spoken across Haringey.

NHS Haringey employs over 700 staff and is one of the largest employers in the borough.

In September 2009, the Hornsey Central Neighbourhood Health Centre was officially opened, providing healthcare services to the local population within a £12 million new development.

== See also ==
- Healthcare in London
