= Synlab Group =

German medical diagnostics provider

SYNLAB Group
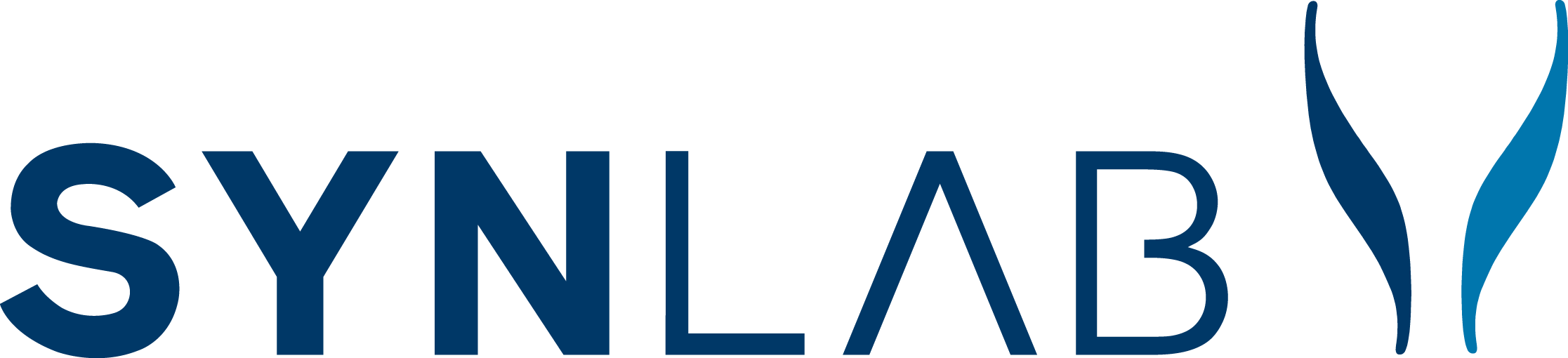
- Company type: Aktiengesellschaft
- Traded as: FWB: SYAB
- ISIN: DE000A2TSL71
- Industry: laboratories
- Founded: 2010 (1998)
- Headquarters: Munich, Germany
- Products: 600 million tests per year
- Services: diagnostics services for human medicine and pharmaceutical industry
- Revenue: 2,635,160,000 euro (2023)
- Operating income: 59,160,000 euro (2023)
- Net income: 92,270,000 euro (2023)
- Total assets: 4,663,270,000 euro (2023)
- Number of employees: 27,000 (2023)
- Website: www.synlab.com

SYNLAB Group is an international medical diagnostics provider headquartered in Munich, Germany. SYNLAB is leading in diagnostic services and specialty testing in Europe.

== History ==
In 1998, together with his partners, Bartl Wimmer founded SYNLAB GmbH in Augsburg, Germany, as an association of freelance laboratory physicians. In 2010, SYNLAB merged with the two laboratory providers, Futurelab and Fleming Labs, which laid the groundwork for several further acquisitions. SYNLAB was acquired by the European private equity investor Cinven in 2015.

In August 2015, the private equity company Cinven acquired French laboratory service provider Labco. Labco SA was founded in 2004 by a group of French biologists as a cooperation of nine French laboratories. In 2007, Labco took over General Lab in Spain and Portugal. In October 2015, Cinven took over the majority of shares of SYNLAB and merged both companies to become SYNLAB Group. Before, the private equity company BC Partners was the majority shareholder of SYNLAB. In December 2016, Novo Holdings A/S acquired 10% of SYNLAB shares, which was increased to about 20% in 2017.

In 2015, SYNLAB entered the African market. From 2016 to 2019, SYNLAB spent an average of 200 million euros annually on acquiring new companies.

In January 2020, it won a tender for a centralised pathology service to serve Guy's and St Thomas' NHS Foundation Trust, King's College Hospital NHS Foundation Trust, South London and Maudsley NHS Foundation Trust, Oxleas NHS Foundation Trust and Royal Brompton and Harefield NHS Foundation Trust for 15 years.

During the COVID-19 pandemic in August 2020, SYNLAB received a contract from UEFA to test players, officials, and referees and has been named the "UEFA Laboratory Diagnostics Provider 2020/2021". For 2021, SYNLAB reported an increase in sales of around 44% due to the high number of PCR tests.

In 2021 SYNLAB sold its Analytics & Services activities to SGS, a company providing inspection, verification, testing and certification services.

Since 2022, SYNLAB has been expanding in the Latin American market. For instance, the company entered the Chilean market in 2022 to expand its presence in fast-growing emerging markets. Other complementary bolt-on acquisitions were made in countries like France, Germany, Mexico and Colombia.

SYNLAB sold its veterinary diagnostics segment to Mars Incorporated in 2023.

In July 2024, Synlab was delisted from German stock exchanges at its own request.

In October 2024, SYNLAB agreed to sell its Spanish business to Eurofins Scientific

== Corporate structure ==
Mathieu Floreani is the CEO of SYNLAB Group, who changed from DHL to SYNLAB in 2018. The former CEO and co-founder of SYNLAB, Bartl Wimmer, retired from this position at the end of March 2018. Also part of the Management Board is Sami Badarani, Group CFO, who joined the company in 2017.

Headquartered in Munich, Germany, the company is present in more than 30 countries on four continents and employs around 28,000 people. The company performed 600 million laboratory tests and achieved sales revenues of approximately 3.25 billion euros in 2022. SYNLAB grows organically and through mergers and acquisitions as an industry consolidator. SYNLAB has been listed in the Prime Standard on the Frankfurt Stock Exchange since April 2021. Between 2015 and 2022, SYNLAB made 152 acquisitions in more than 20 countries, with a total enterprise value of around 1 billion euros.

== Laboratories ==
In total, ca. 500 laboratories belong to the SYNLAB hub and spoke laboratory network. The network comprises, among others, two European reference laboratories situated near Stuttgart and Barcelona, as well as 31 central laboratories that are specialised and also run tests for other laboratories within the network. Regional and emergency laboratories constitute the majority of the network.

SYNLAB runs several competence centres, such as the WHO supranational reference laboratory in Munich-Gauting, a centre specialised in tuberculosis. SYNLAB's Spanish Molecular Genetics Department was the first laboratory in Europe to develop a non-invasive prenatal genetic test. SYNLAB also acquired Sistemas Genómicos, a laboratory specialised in genetics and bioinformatics from Spain, in 2022.

== Services and activities ==
SYNLAB provides medical diagnostic services to practising doctors, hospitals and clinics, governments, and corporates. The company also operates a network of more than 1,800 blood collection points (BCPs) for patients. SYNLAB's multidisciplinary range of services includes, in the field of human medicine, clinical chemistry, haematology, coagulation, microbiology, serology, immunology, genetics, molecular biology, pathology, cytology, endocrinology, and maternity care. The SYNLAB laboratories examine 600 million samples (e.g. urine, blood, tissue) every year on the basis of around 5,000 different test parameters. Approximately 50 new parameters are added each year.

In 2020, for example, Microba and SYNLAB entered an agreement to supply Microba's tests to healthcare providers in Spain and other countries in Europe and Latin America.
