= Tim Smart =

Tim Smart may refer to:

- Tim Smart (cricketer)
- Tim Smart (businessman)
