= Queen Mary's Hospital, Sidcup =

Queen Mary's Hospital
- Oxleas NHS Foundation Trust
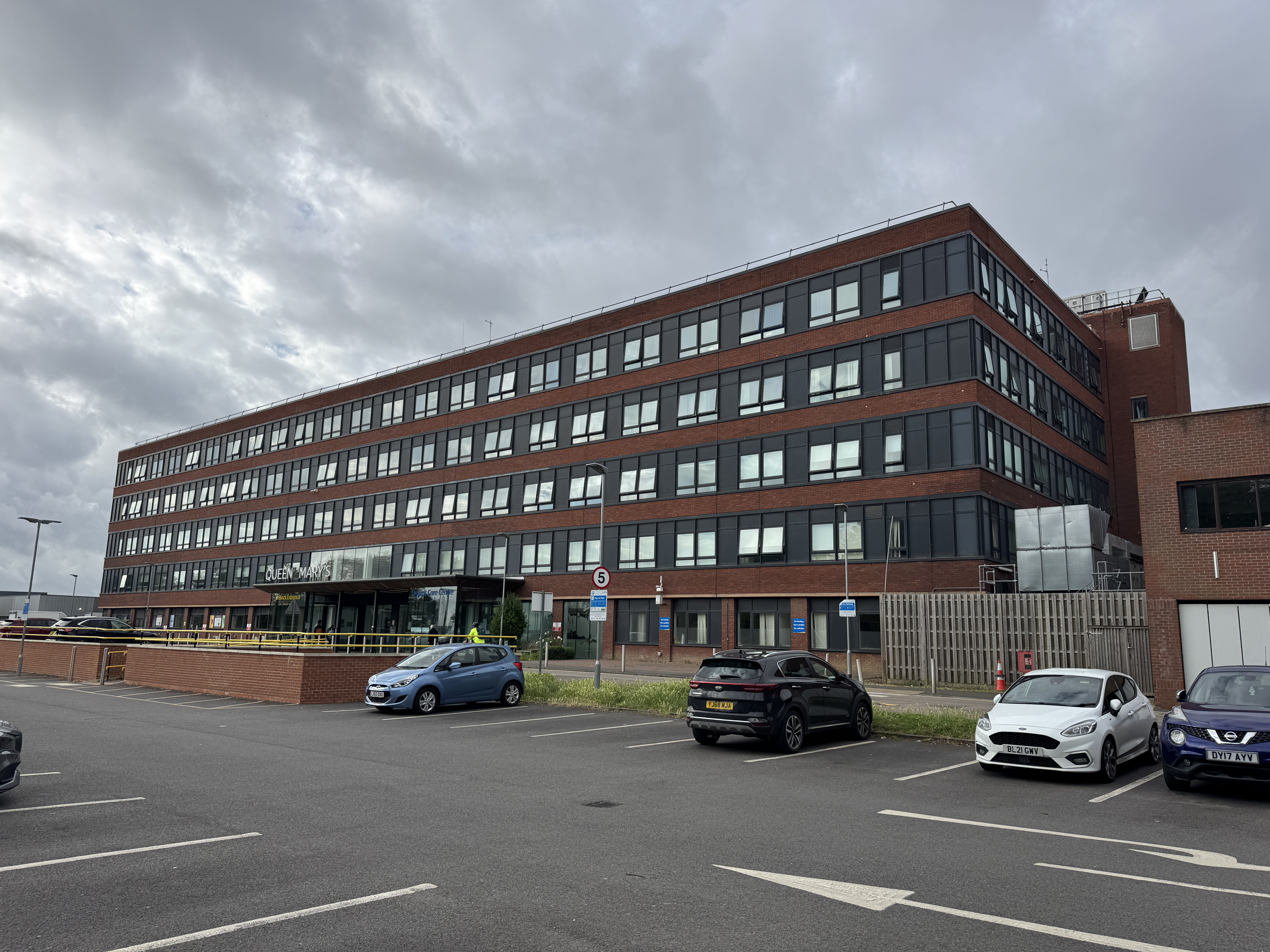
- Queen Mary's Hospital in 2026

Geography
- Location: Sidcup, London, England
- Coordinates: 51.4189°N 0.1014°E

Organisation
- Care system: National Health Service
- Type: Community

Services
- Emergency department: Urgent care centre only
- Beds: 430

History
- Founded: 18 August 1917; 109 years ago

Links
- Website: oxleas.nhs.uk/queen-marys-hospital/

Queen Mary's Hospital is a community hospital in Sidcup in the London Borough of Bexley.

The hospital is managed by Oxleas NHS Foundation Trust, with services also being provided by King's College Hospital NHS Foundation Trust, Lewisham and Greenwich NHS Trust, Dartford and Gravesham NHS Trust and Guy's and St Thomas' NHS Foundation Trust. The Urgent Care Centre has been managed by the Hurley Group since July 2014.

== History ==
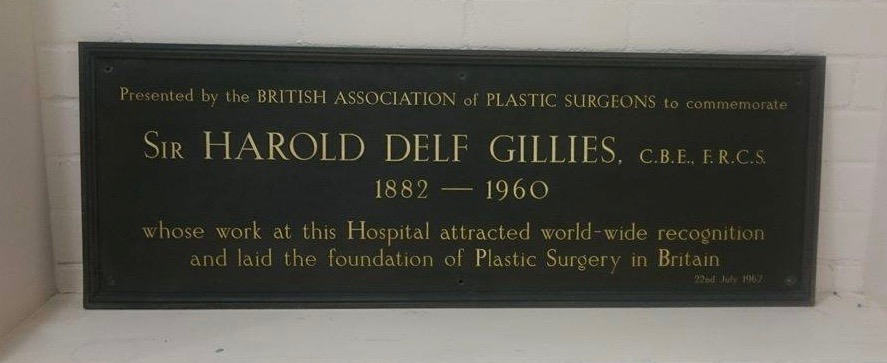
A plaque commemorating Sir Harold Gillies' contribution to Plastic Surgery

The Queen's Hospital was opened in prefabricated buildings in the grounds of Frognal House on 18 August 1917. It provided pioneering plastic surgery under the guidance of Sir Harold Gillies to soldiers sustaining facial injuries during First World War.

It was re-opened as a general hospital known as Queen Mary's Hospital by Queen Mary in 1930. From 1930 to 1948 it was run by London County Council.

Nurses' badge

It was damaged by bombing during World War II and joined the National Health Service in 1948. The prefabricated buildings were replaced by more permanent structures between 1962 and 1974.

In April 2009 three NHS Trusts merged, those of Queen Mary's Sidcup, Queen Elizabeth Hospital and Bromley Hospitals as the multi-site South London Healthcare NHS Trust.

In November 2010 the hospital's A & E Department temporarily closed along with the maternity services in the Kent Women's Wing. Acute services were transferred to the two sister hospitals, the Queen Elizabeth Hospital, London and the Princess Royal University Hospital in Farnborough.

In October 2013, the merged Trust was dissolved, and the hospital split between various other trusts. Oxleas NHS Foundation Trust became the owner of the estate and took responsibility for the running of some clinical services. King's College Hospital NHS Foundation Trust and Lewisham and Greenwich NHS Trust became responsible for running other clinical services at the hospital.

A fire in a derelict maternity ward was quickly brought under control in August 2015.

== Transport ==
The hospital is served by London Buses routes 160, 229, 269, 286, B14, R11 and SL3. The nearest railway station is Sidcup, on the Dartford Loop Line.
