= Bromley Hospital =

- Bromley Hospitals NHS Trust
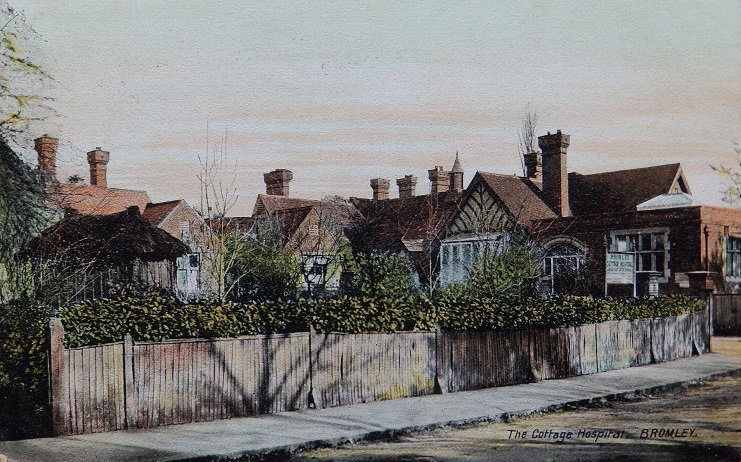
- Bromley Hospital

- Shown in Bromley

Geography
- Location: Bromley, London, England, United Kingdom
- Coordinates: 51.3971°N 0.01927°E

Organisation
- Care system: NHS England
- Type: Cottage Hospital

History
- Founded: 1869

Links
- Lists: Hospitals in England

Bromley Hospital was a health facility on Bromley, London. It was managed by Bromley Hospitals NHS Trust.

== History ==
The hospital had its origins in a cottage hospital established in two small cottages in Cromwell Avenue in May 1869. A new purpose-built hospital, still known as Bromley Cottage Hospital, was built on the site in 1875 and an extension was completed in 1886.

The hospital was again completely rebuilt in the early 20th century and the new facility was opened by Constance, Dowager Countess of Derby in 1911. It became the Bromley (Kent) and District Hospital in 1928 and the Bromley and District Hospital in 1936. It joined the National Health Service in 1948 and became Bromley Hospital in 1990. After services were transferred to the Princess Royal University Hospital, the Bromley Hospital closed in 2003. The site has since been redeveloped by Barratt Developments for residential use.
