= Henrietta Hannath =

Henrietta Hannath RRC and Bar
- Born: 1863; Worksop, Nottingham
- Died: 1939 (aged 75–76)
- Education: King's College Hospital and the London Hospital
- Occupation: Nursing leader

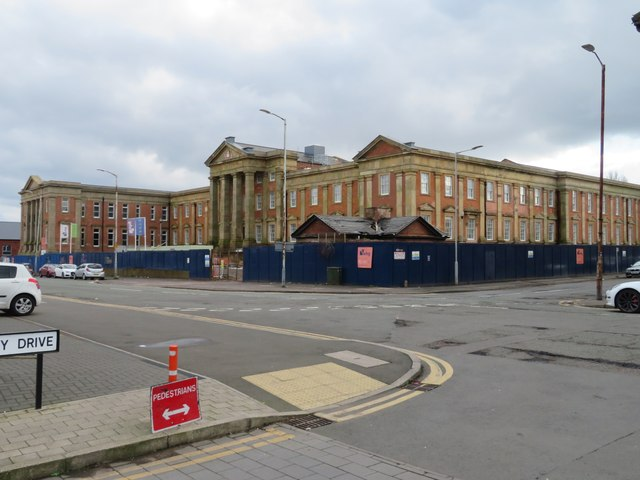
Royal Wolverhampton Hospital

Henrietta Hannath R.R.C. and Bar (1863–1939) was a nurse and war time military nursing leader. She was a founding member of the College of Nursing (later Royal College of Nursing), and matron of the Royal Hospital, Wolverhampton for eighteen years.

== Early life ==
Hannath was born in Worksop, Nottinghamshire to Henry, a wine merchant and malster, and his wife Elizabeth. She was one of at least eight children. After her father died, her mother ran a school.

== Nursing career ==
Hannath trained at King's College Hospital, London. She worked at the London Hospital under matron Eva Luckes from 1893 to 1894 as Home Sister, and was also in charge of teaching sick room cookery. Because of restructuring, in 1895 she moved to Bristol Royal Infirmary as night sister. Hannath became matron of Eastville Workhouse Hospital, Bristol in 1898, and moved to Wolverhampton and Staffordshire General Hospital as night sister, then assistant matron, and was appointed matron in 1906. Hannath resigned from the matronship in 1923.

== War time career ==
Hannath was a member of the Territorial Army Nursing Service. In 1914, she was appointed matron of the 5th Northern General Hospital, Leicester, which opened at Leicestershire & Rutland County Asylum (today the University of Leicester), and eventually expanded into other institutions. She remained at the hospital between 1914-1919.

== Retirement and death ==
Hannath retired in 1923. She died in Plymouth on 21 January 1939, and her funeral was held in Plympton, Devon.

== Honours ==
- Royal Red Cross - 1917
- Bar to Royal Red Cross, 1920.
