= Memorial Hospital, Woolwich =

- Oxleas NHS Foundation Trust
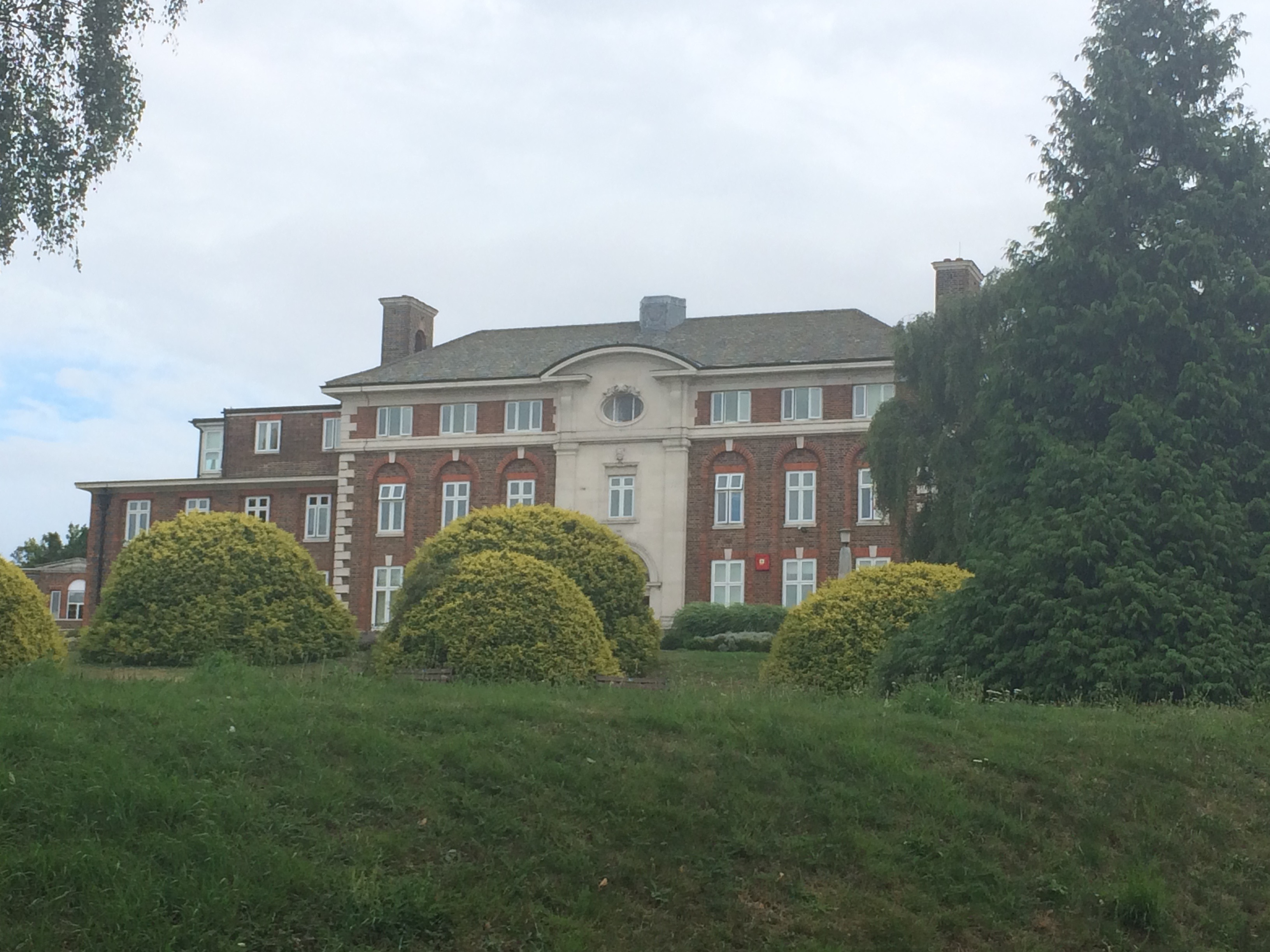
- Memorial Hospital, Woolwich

- Location within Greenwich

Geography
- Location: Shooter's Hill, London
- Coordinates: 51.4689°N 0.0654°E

Organisation
- Care system: NHS England

Services
- Emergency department: No

History
- Founded: 1925

Links
- Website: oxleas.nhs.uk

The Memorial Hospital, Woolwich (sometimes also called the Greenwich Memorial Hospital) is a hospital situated on Shooter's Hill in southeast London in the Royal Borough of Greenwich. Today run by the Oxleas NHS Foundation Trust, it mainly functions as a day centre for the elderly while also offering facilities for psychiatric patients.

== History ==
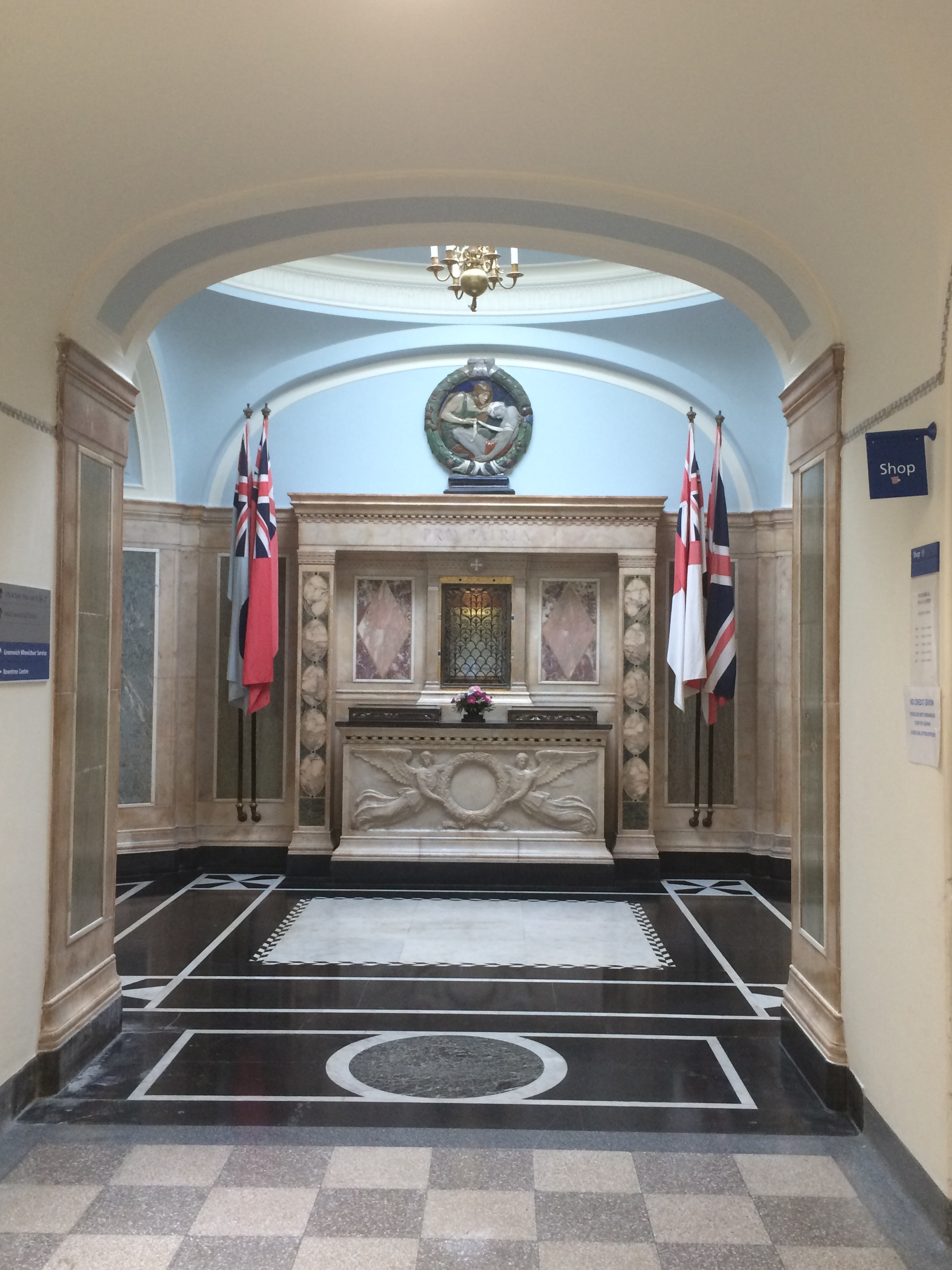
Hall of Remembrance within the hospital

After the First World War, a fund was set up to raise the anticipated £50,000 cost of the new hospital building to be a lasting memorial for the war dead from the local area and to replace the Woolwich and Plumstead Cottage Hospital. The site selected was Telegraph Field (so named as it was once used as a semaphore station).

In 1925 the Duke of Connaught laid the foundation stone and, in 1927, the 112-bed Woolwich and District Hospital Association Cottage Hospital was officially opened by the Duke and Duchess of York (later King George VI and Queen Elizabeth). By 1930 it was known as the Woolwich and District War Memorial Hospital, then (from 1931) the Woolwich and District Hospital Association War Memorial Hospital and (from 1938) the Memorial Hospital.

During the Second World War it became a military hospital (in 1944 it had 137 beds), providing back-up facilities for the nearby Royal Herbert Hospital. In 1948, it joined the National Health Service as a general hospital. For some years in the 1960s it specialised in surgery, before transferring medical beds to the nearby Brook General Hospital and becoming a geriatric hospital in the 1970s.

Since at least 2005, it has been run by the Oxleas NHS Foundation Trust, and mainly functions as a day centre for the elderly while also offering facilities for psychiatric patients.
