= Oxleas NHS Foundation Trust =

NHS foundation trust in South East London and Kent

- Type: NHS foundation trust
- Established: 8 February 1994
- Headquarters: Dartford, Kent, England
- Hospitals: Memorial Hospital; Queen Mary's Hospital
- Staff: 4,983 WTE (2024/25)
- Website: oxleas.nhs.uk

Oxleas NHS Foundation Trust is a National Health Service trust named after the ancient Oxleas Woods between Bexley and Greenwich.

== History ==
The trust was established as the Bexley Community Health NHS Trust on 8 February 1994, and became operation on 1 April 1994. It was renamed Oxleas NHS Trust on 14 May 1995, and became a foundation trust in May 2006.

== Current status ==
Oxleas NHS Foundation Trust is an NHS Foundation Trust providing community health, mental health and learning disability services primarily to the London Boroughs of Bromley, Greenwich and Bexley. The trust provides additional specialist forensic psychiatric services to people from Lewisham as well as its core areas and healthcare services to prisons in Kent.

Oxleas NHS Foundation Trust headquarters are at Dartford and in-patient services are located at the campuses of Queen Mary's Hospital, Sidcup; Princess Royal University Hospital, Farnborough, Kent and Queen Elizabeth Hospital, Woolwich. Forensic in-patient services are concentrated at the Bracton Centre in Dartford. Memorial Hospital is a hospital owned by Oxleas NHS Foundation Trust. Oxleas operates several facilities including inpatient services for elderly people. There is also a large community outreach service network so that people can live at home and be helped both in their own homes, and as outpatients at various locations where Oxleas staff help their patients.

== Queen Mary's Hospital, Sidcup ==
Oxleas took over the running of Queen Mary's Hospital in Sidcup on 1 October 2013 and is investing up to £30million to develop the facilities at the hospital. In 2012, the Special Administrator, Matthew Kershaw of the Department of Health, was requested by the Secretary of State for Health to investigate concerns that South London Healthcare NHS Trust was not a viable concern. After public consultation and much investigation, it was declared on 31 January 2013 that the South London Healthcare NHS Trust would be disbanded. This led to action in the High Court. There was much debate about whether this would improve health care in South London and questions have been asked in Parliament as to the wisdom of reorganising so many health trusts on account of one hospital trust being disbanded. Caroline Taylor has taken over as Special Administrator of South London Healthcare NHS Trust.

== Estates ==
The trust established a partnership with Morgan Sindall and Arcadis in July 2017 to manage its estate. It planned to redevelop land at four key sites in southeast London including 39.5 acres at Queen Mary's Hospital and the re-provision of primary care at a site in Plumstead.

== Council of Governors ==
Oxleas has a governing body, a Council of Governors. They hold quarterly council meetings and publish their agenda and minutes on their website for everyone to read. The latest details of the Governing Board meetings on the Oxleas NHS Foundation website is for September 2012. Richard Diment, elected governor in September 2012, had an official blog for the trust in which he has made comments upon the Mid-Staffordshire Inquiry Report

== Controversies ==
In 2011 a murder was committed by a patient who had left one of the trust's facilities after being taken there by police. The family of the victim have launched legal proceedings. In June 2013 the trust faced a further legal challenge after the death by suicide of a patient at its Green Park House facility.

== Performance ==
It was named by the Health Service Journal as the second best mental health trust to work for in 2015. At that time it had 3071 full time equivalent staff and a sickness absence rate of 4.38%. 74% of staff recommend it as a place for treatment and 74% recommended it as a place to work.

The trust broke from the national pay agreement in August 2015 by giving a 1% pay rise to its senior non-clinical staff – those earning above £57,069 – in line with the award for the rest of the staff.

In March 2016 the Trust was ranked second in the Learning from Mistakes League.

== See also ==
- Healthcare in London
- Healthcare in Kent
