= Phil Bates (footballer) =

English footballer

Personal information
- Full name: Philip William Bates
- Date of birth: 16 November 1897
- Place of birth: Penge, England
- Date of death: 19 January 1974 (aged 76)
- Place of death: Beckenham, England
- Position: Centre half

Senior career*
Years	Team	Apps	(Gls)
- Beckenham Wanderers
1919–1921	Crystal Palace	66	(3)
- Scunthorpe & Lindsey United
- * Club domestic league appearances and goals

Philip William Bates (16 November 1897 – 19 January 1974) was an English professional footballer who played as a centre half in the Football League for Crystal Palace.

== Personal life ==
Prior to the First World War, Bates worked in his family's greengrocer business. After the outbreak of the war in 1914, he attested in the Queen's Own (Royal West Kent Regiment) and gave his age as 19 years and 9 months, three years older than he was in reality. After a period training, Bates' battalion arrived on the Western Front in June 1915. He was wounded in the right arm in March 1916 and evacuated to Wharncliffe War Hospital in Sheffield. The resultant paralysis, caused by arthritis, led to Bates' discharge from the army later in the year. Despite the injury, he was able to return to work as a grocer and to football, though he was only able to play until he was forced into retirement in 1921. After the war, Bates married and established a grocer's in Beckenham. His business was damaged by a V-1 flying bomb during the Second World War. He died of lung cancer at Beckenham Hospital in 1974.

== Career statistics ==
Appearances and goals by club, season and competition
Club	Season	League			FA Cup		Total	
Club	Season	Division	Apps	Goals	Apps	Goals	Apps	Goals
Crystal Palace	1919–20	Southern League First Division	26	1	0	0	26	1
Crystal Palace	1920–21	Third Division	40	2	2	0	42	2
Career total			66	3	2	0	68	3

== Honours ==
Crystal Palace

- Football League Third Division: 1920–21
