= Shelford Group =

Collaboration of hospital trusts in England

The Shelford Group is a collaboration of ten of the largest teaching and research NHS hospital trusts in England. The ten members collectively employ over 170,000 people, account for over £17 billion of the NHS budget and for almost two thirds of the country’s clinical research infrastructure.

The member organisations are:

- Cambridge University Hospitals NHS Foundation Trust
- Guy's and St Thomas' NHS Foundation Trust
- Imperial College Healthcare NHS Trust
- King's College Hospital NHS Foundation Trust
- Manchester University NHS Foundation Trust
- Newcastle upon Tyne Hospitals NHS Foundation Trust
- Oxford University Hospitals NHS Foundation Trust
- Sheffield Teaching Hospitals NHS Foundation Trust
- University College London Hospitals NHS Foundation Trust
- University Hospitals Birmingham NHS Foundation Trust
