= Croydon University Hospital =

Coordinates: 51.390°N 0.110°W

- Croydon Health Services NHS Trust
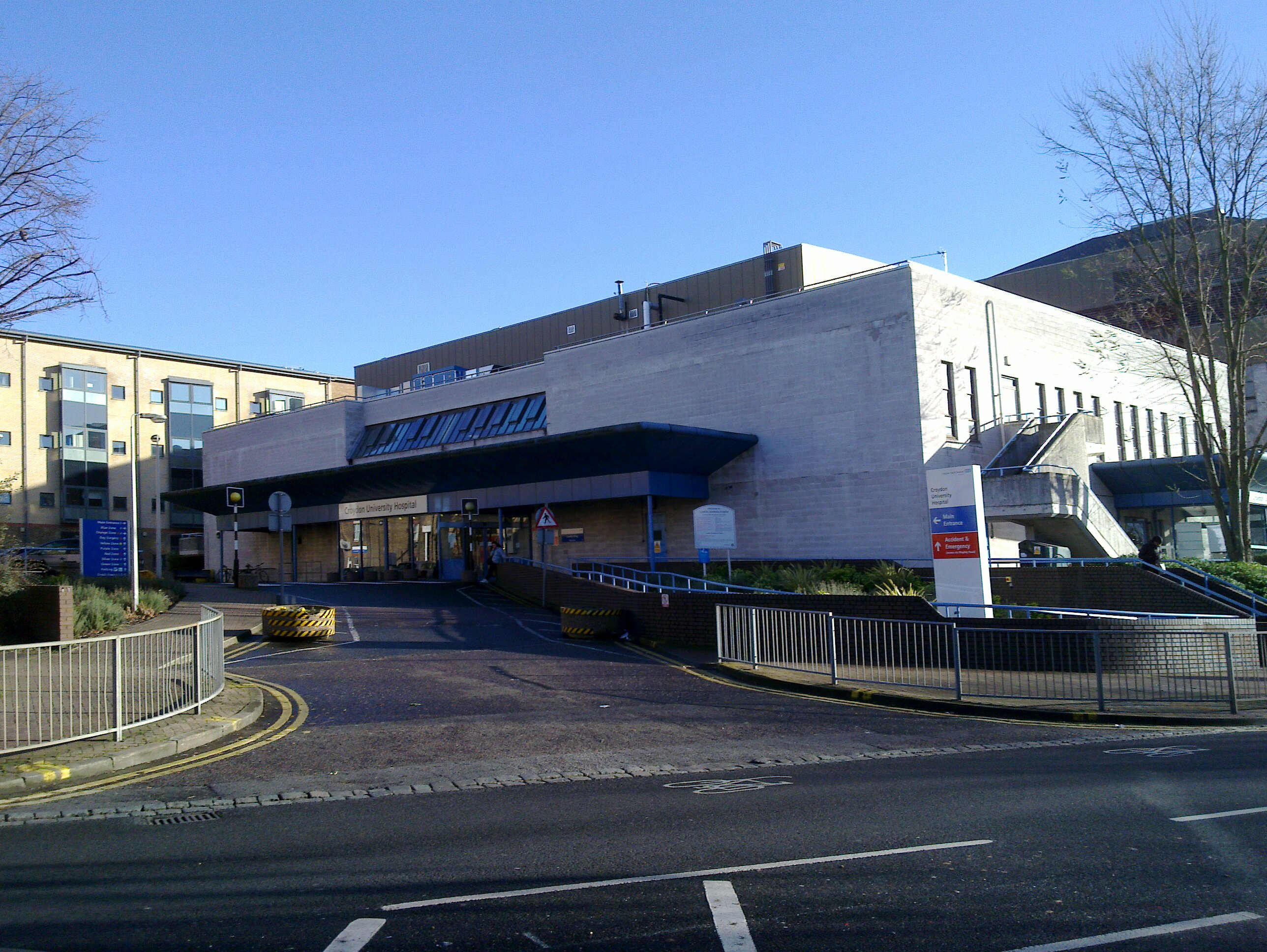

- Location within Croydon

Geography
- Location: 530 London Road, Thornton Heath CR7 7YE, London, England

Organisation
- Care system: NHS England
- Type: District General
- Affiliated university: St George's, University of London; Guy's King's and St. Thomas' School of Medicine and Dentistry

Services
- Emergency department: Yes
- Beds: 670

History
- Founded: May 1885; 141 years ago

Links
- Website: www.croydonhealthservices.nhs.uk
- Lists: Hospitals in England

Croydon University Hospital, known from 1923 to 2002 as Mayday Hospital and from 2002 to 2010 as Croydon Hospital, is a large NHS hospital in Thornton Heath in south London, England run by Croydon Health Services NHS Trust. It is a District General Hospital with a 24-hour Accident and Emergency department. The hospital is based on a 19-acre (7.7 ha) site in Thornton Heath to the north of central Croydon.

== History ==
The hospital's roots are as the infirmary of the Croydon Workhouse opened in Mayday Road by the Rt. Rev. Edward Benson, Archbishop of Canterbury, in May 1885. It replaced the previous infirmary in Duppas Hill. The Croydon Union Infirmary was renamed Mayday Hospital (though usually referred to as Mayday Road Hospital) in June 1923. Under the terms of the Local Government Act 1929, it was taken over by Croydon Corporation in April 1932; and then by the National Health Service in July 1948. The name was changed to Croydon Hospital in 2002 and was changed again to Croydon University Hospital in 2010.

A new out-patients department was opened by the Rt. Rev. Michael Ramsey, Archbishop of Canterbury, in 1966 and a new surgical wing was opened by Bernard Weatherill, Speaker of the House of Commons in May 1985. More recently, a large building project was the Jubilee Wing opened by John Reid, the Secretary of State for Health, in December 2004.

== Facilities ==
Facilities at the hospital include 670 beds, eight operating theatres, a day surgery suite with three theatres, two obstetric theatres and recovery room, and overnight facilities for parents. Croydon Health Services NHS Trust is developing an application for Foundation Trust status. In a survey conducted in 2017 the trust was rated "worse than expected" over care for women giving birth.

The Acute Medical Unit was opened in 2012; it contains 42 beds and provides rapid assessment and treatment for patients admitted from GPs or A&E. Patients may be discharged from AMU after a short stay (normally under 48 hours) or admitted to a specialty ward. The unit is also home to an Acute Care of the Elderly unit, and a Rapid Assessment Medical Unit with 13 beds, where patients can be quickly assessed by acute medicine doctors and either admitted to the AMU or to a specialist ward.

In 2018, the trust opened its new Emergency Department. The new department is 30% larger than the previous department, and cost over £21 million to build. Facilities in the department include:

- 3 triage rooms
- 28 Majors enclosed rooms
- 9 Urgent Treatment Centre rooms (2 for children) and a treatment room
- 8 Resuscitation bays (2 for children)
- 3 mental health rooms (Care is provided by the South London & Maudsley NHS Foundation Trust) and an interview room
- Plaster cast facilities
- Decontamination and major incident facilities

== See also ==
- Healthcare in London
