= Croydon Health Services NHS Trust =

Healthcare trust in England

- Type: NHS trust
- Established: 1 August 2010
- Headquarters: Thornton Heath, London, England
- Hospitals: Croydon University Hospital; Purley War Memorial Hospital
- Chair: Yemisi Gibbons
- Chief executive: Matthew Kershaw
- Staff: 4,629 WTE (2023)
- Website: www.croydonhealthservices.nhs.uk

Croydon Health Services NHS Trust is an NHS trust which runs Croydon University Hospital. It also provides services at Purley War Memorial Hospital in Purley, as well as multiple clinics in the local area.

The Trust was formed in 2010 by a merger of Croydon Community Health Services and Mayday Healthcare NHS Trust.

It opened a new child development centre for children with special educational needs and disabilities in January 2017.

The trust announced plans to appoint a joint chief executive with Croydon Clinical commissioning group in May 2019, the first such appointment in England. The two organisations already share a chief nurse and a chief pharmacist.

== Services ==
The Trust provides all levels of secondary care, including district general care to the Croydon area. The trust provides emergency medical and non-elective surgical care, not including major trauma care, at Croydon University Hospital. There are walk-in and book ahead GUM clinic services in the adjoining Croydon Sexual Health Centre, which serve a wide area due to the closing down of neighbouring sexual health services (such as the Courtyard Clinic, previously at St. George's Hospital in Tooting).

== Performance ==
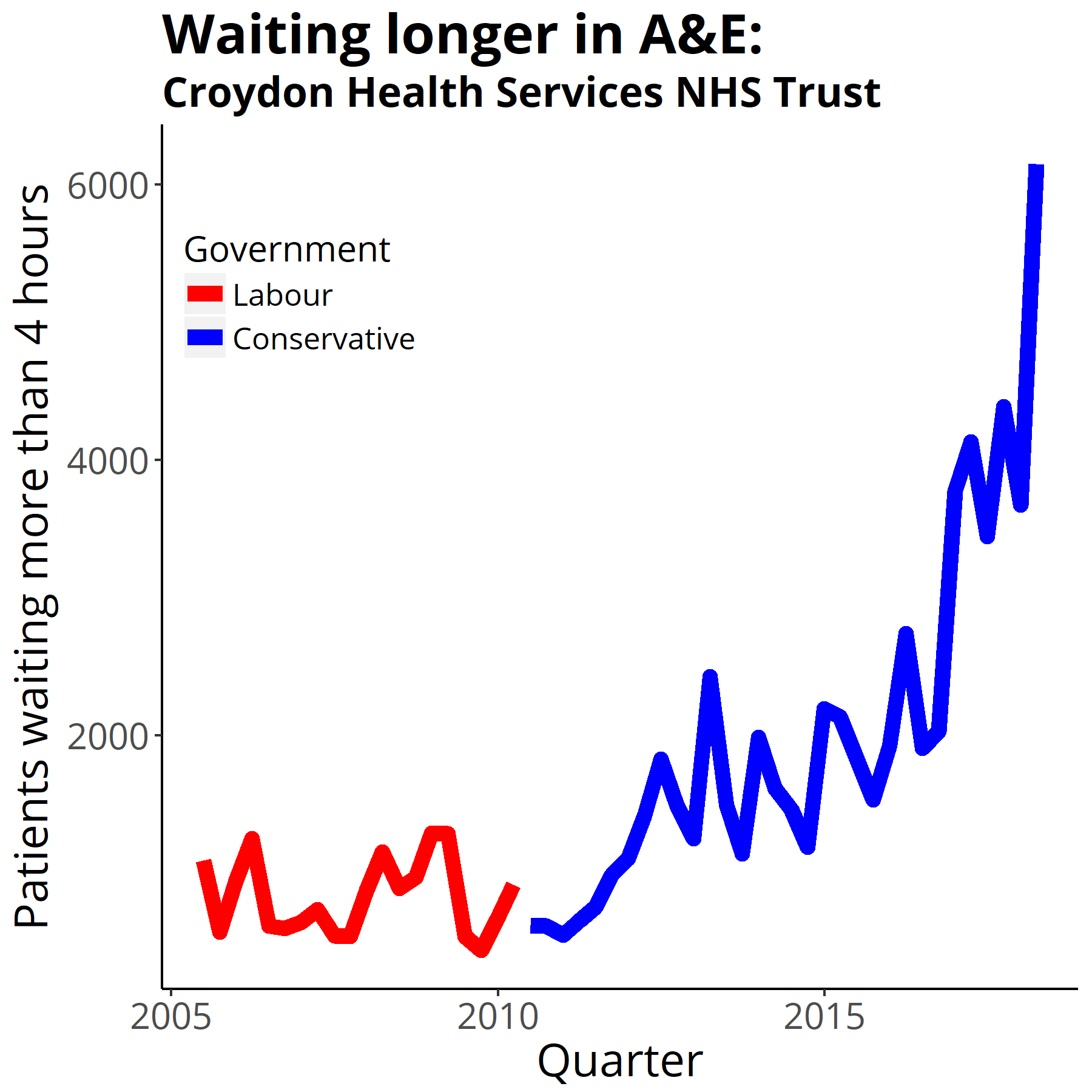
Four-hour target in the emergency department quarterly figures from NHS England Data from https://www.england.nhs.uk/statistics/statistical-work-areas/ae-waiting-times-and-activity/

In October 2013 as a result of the Keogh Review the Trust was put into the highest risk category by the Care Quality Commission The Trust predicts a deficit of £12.2m in 2013-14.

It spent 7.8% of its total turnover on agency staff in 2014/5.

It was put into special measures in July 2016 because of concerns over its financial position, when it had a deficit of £36 million. It was taken out of financial special measures in February 2017, after it reduced its expected deficit to £25 million.

In 2019 it got the lowest score in England from the hospital inpatient survey, largely down to patients' experience of being discharged, despite its supposed integration with mental health services and social care. It also had the second lowest score on whether there were enough nurses.

In December 2019 it was the fifth worst performing trust in England on the 4 hour A&E target, with only 48.2% of patients seen within 4 hours.

== See also ==
- List of NHS trusts
