= Beckenham Hospital =

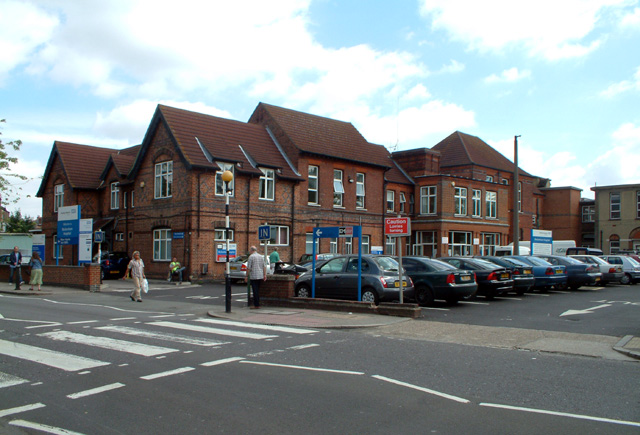
- Beckenham Hospital before the site was redeveloped between 2005 and 2008

- Shown in Bromley

Geography
- Location: Beckenham, London, United Kingdom
- Coordinates: 51.405°N 0.033°W

Organisation
- Care system: Public NHS

History
- Founded: 1872
- Closed: 2005

Links
- Lists: Hospitals in the United Kingdom

Beckenham Hospital was a healthcare facility based in Beckenham, Kent.

== History ==
The hospital was founded by Peter Richard Hoare, the younger (1803-1877) of Kelsey Manor as the Beckenham Cottage Hospital in 1872. Additional facilities were added in 1877 (the Lea Wilson Ward), in 1899 (the Diamond Jubilee Extension) and in 1924 (the Percy Jones Ward). It became the Beckenham General Hospital in 1929 and benefited from further facilities in 1932 (the Ruth Sutton Ward) and in 1939 (the Trapnell Wing).

After it joined the National Health Service in 1948, a new out-patients department was completed in 1959 and the Douglas Lindsay Ward was added in 1969. The hospital closed in 2005 and the site has been developed as a primary healthcare centre known as Beckenham Beacon which opened in 2009.

== Notable staff ==
- Mary Jane Costford (1858-1946), Matron from 1889 until about 1916. Her leaving 'Testimonial' raised over £100. Costford trained at The London Hospital under Eva Luckes between 1883 and 1885.

== See also ==
- List of hospitals in England
