= Beckenham Beacon =

- King's College Hospital NHS Foundation Trust
- Shown in Bromley

Geography
- Location: Beckenham, London, United Kingdom
- Coordinates: 51.405°N 0.033°W

Organisation
- Care system: Public NHS
- Type: Community

History
- Founded: 2009

Links
- Website: pruh.kch.nhs.uk/getting-here/beckenham-beacon/
- Lists: Hospitals in the United Kingdom

Beckenham Beacon is a redeveloped health centre in Beckenham, on the site of the old Beckenham Hospital, in the London Borough of Bromley, England. It is managed by King's College Hospital NHS Foundation Trust. It opened in 2009.

== History ==
The hospital was established on the site of the old Beckenham Hospital in 2009.

== Services ==
The centre provides community health services, a minor injuries unit, Special Care Dental Services and out of hours emergency dental service, x-ray facilities, a pharmacy and blood testing as well as general practitioner services at the Elm House Surgery and the Cator Medical Centre.

== See also ==
- List of hospitals in England
