= King's College Hospital =

Hospital in London, England

Coordinates: 51.468°N 0.0938°W

- King's College Hospital NHS Foundation Trust
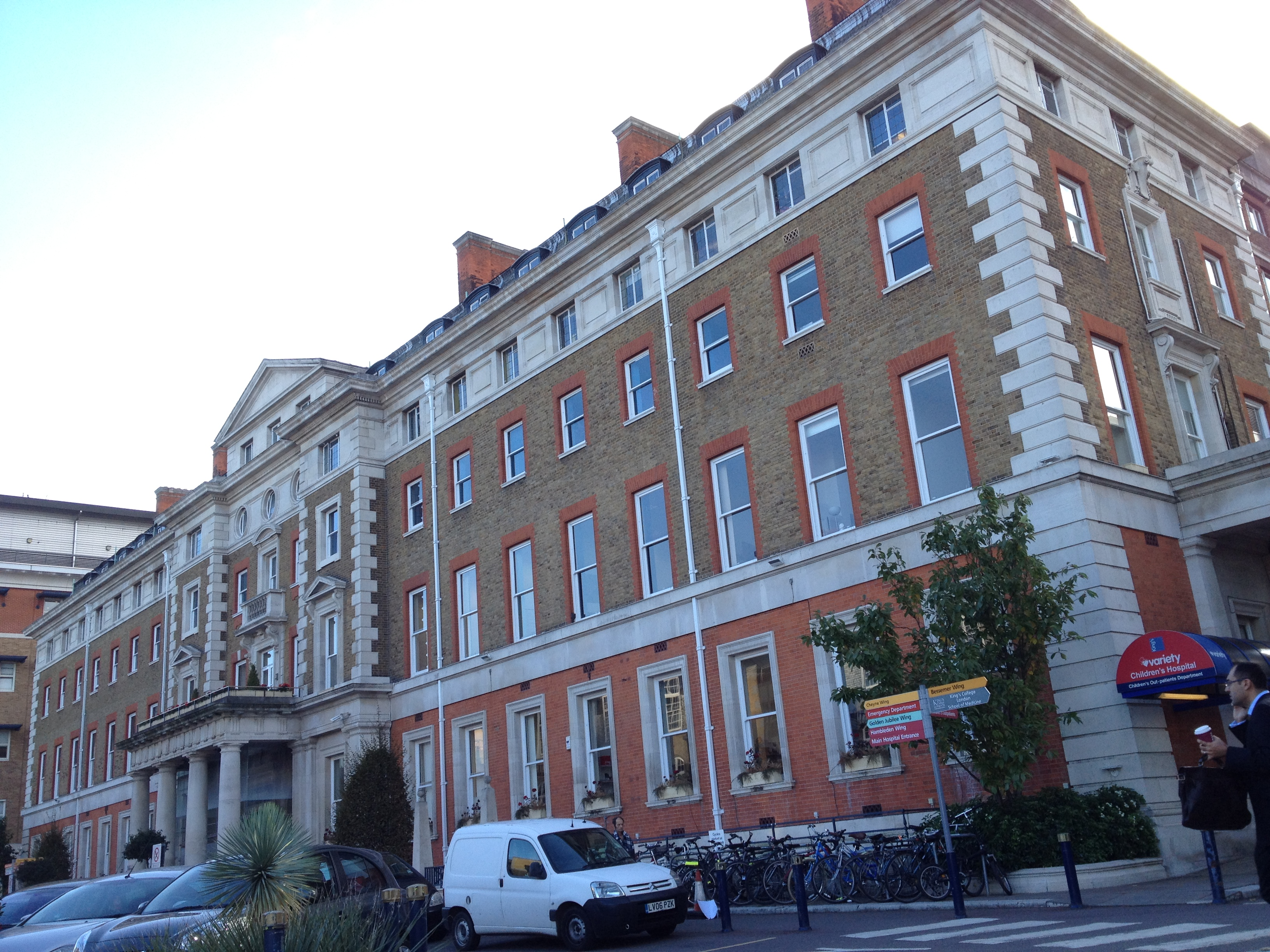
- King's College Hospital main entrance in 2015

- Shown in Lambeth

Geography
- Location: Denmark Hill, Camberwell, London SE5 9RS, England

Organisation
- Care system: National Health Service
- Type: Teaching
- Affiliated university: King's College London

Services
- Emergency department: Major Trauma Centre – (Adult and Children)
- Beds: 950
- Speciality: Liver Disease, Neurology, Neurosurgery, Dentistry, Trauma (medicine)

History
- Founded: 1840; 186 years ago, current site 1909

Links
- Website: www.kch.nhs.uk

King's College Hospital is a major teaching hospital and major trauma centre in Denmark Hill, Camberwell in the London Borough of Lambeth, referred to locally and by staff simply as "King's" or abbreviated internally to "KCH". It is managed by King's College Hospital NHS Foundation Trust. It serves a local population of 700,000 in the London boroughs of Southwark and Lambeth, but also serves as a tertiary referral centre in certain specialties to millions of people in southern England. It is a large teaching hospital and is, with Guy's Hospital and St. Thomas' Hospital, the location of King's College London School of Medicine and one of the institutions that comprise the King's Health Partners, an academic health science centre. It is also the birthplace of Queen Camilla.

== History ==
=== Early history ===
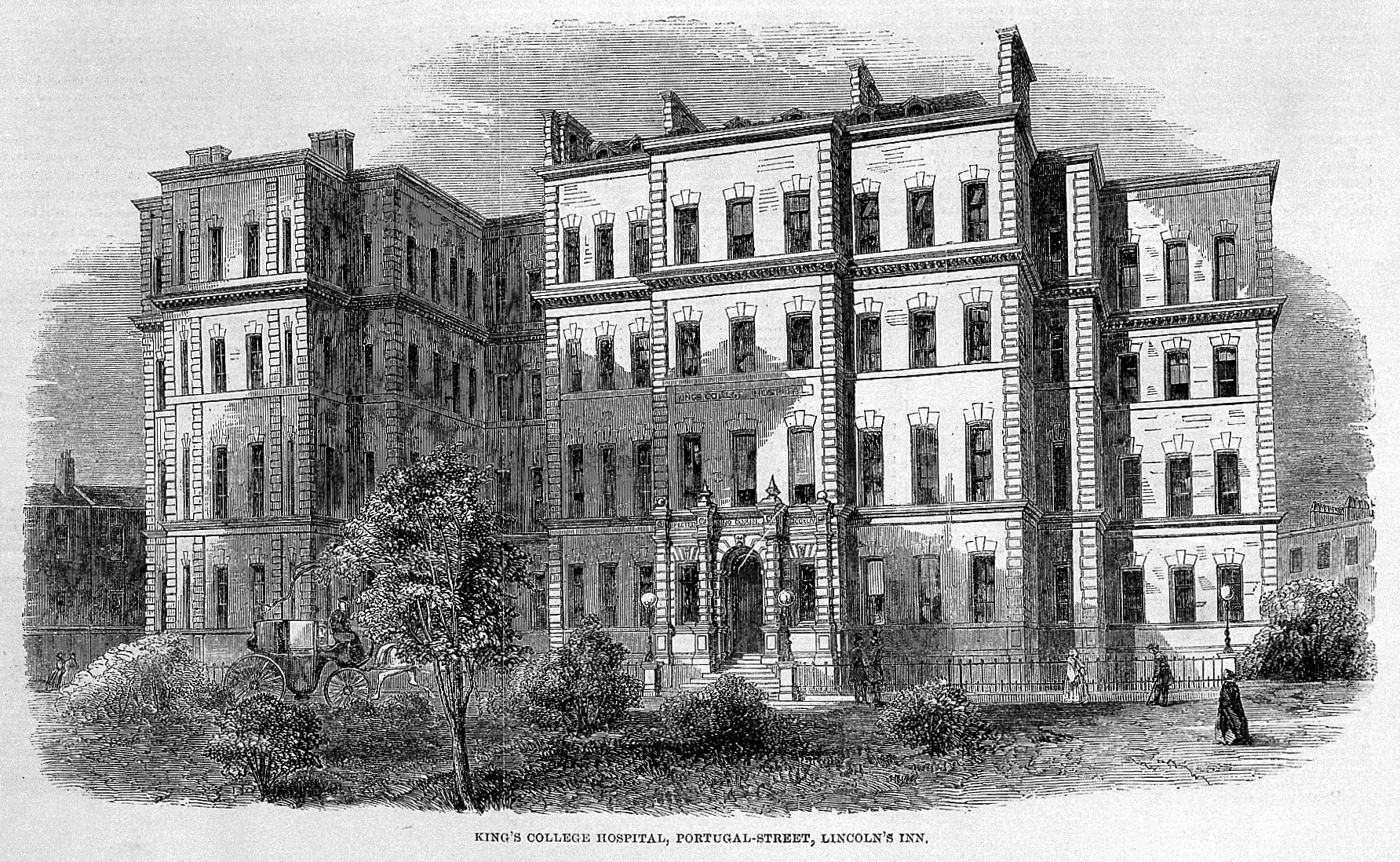
King's College Hospital in Portugal Street, Lincoln Inn Fields c1840s

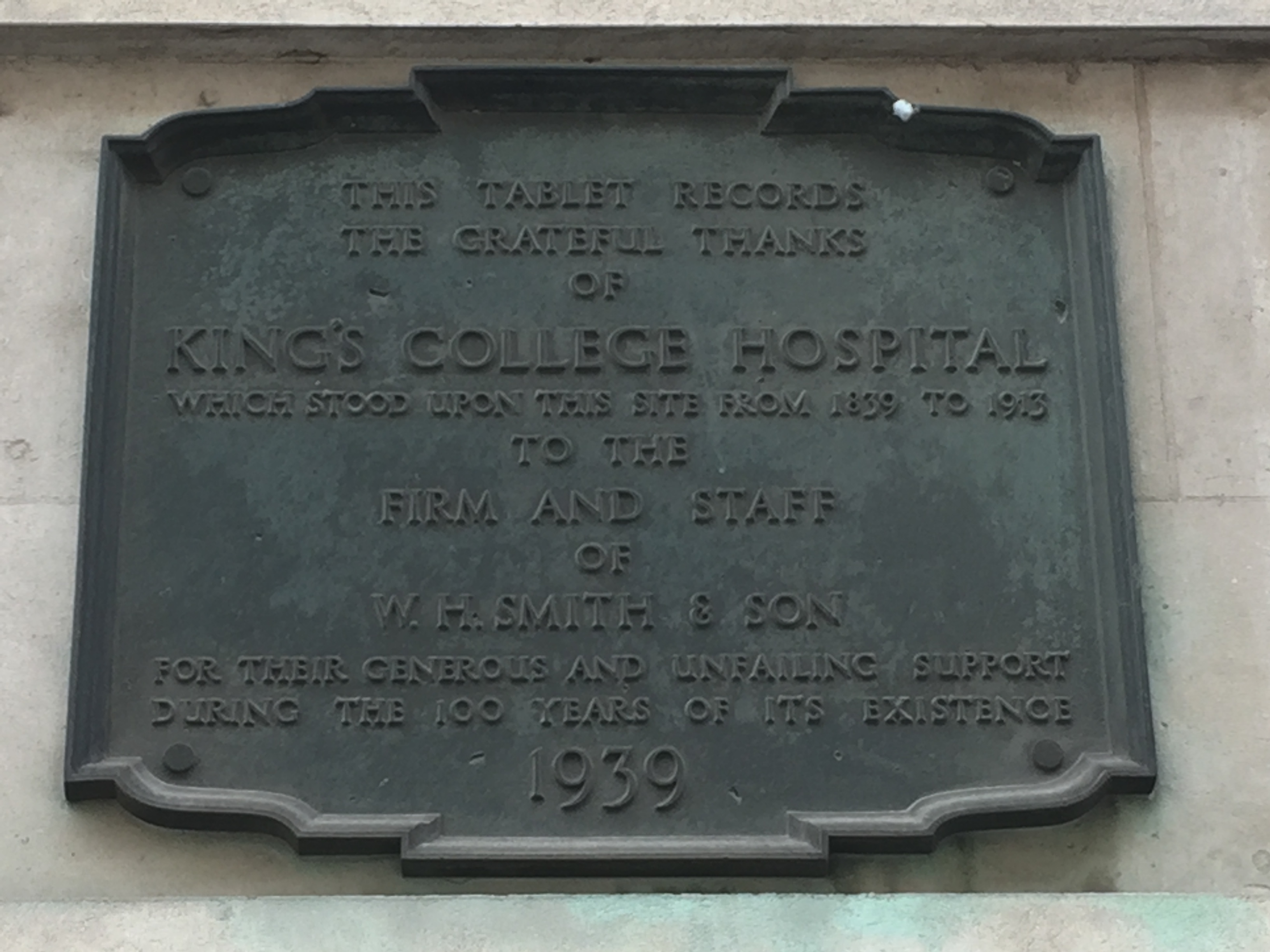
Plaque marking where King's College Hospital once stood, now on LSE grounds

King's College Hospital Act 1851
- Act of Parliament
- Parliament of the United Kingdom
- Long title: An Act for incorporating the Council of King's College, London, and the President, Vice-Presidents, Treasurer, and Governors of King's College Hospital, and for connecting the said Hospital as a Medical School with the said College, and for better enabling the Corporation to carry on their charitable and useful Designs.
- Citation: 14 & 15 Vict. c. cxxxviii

Dates
- Royal assent: 7 August 1851

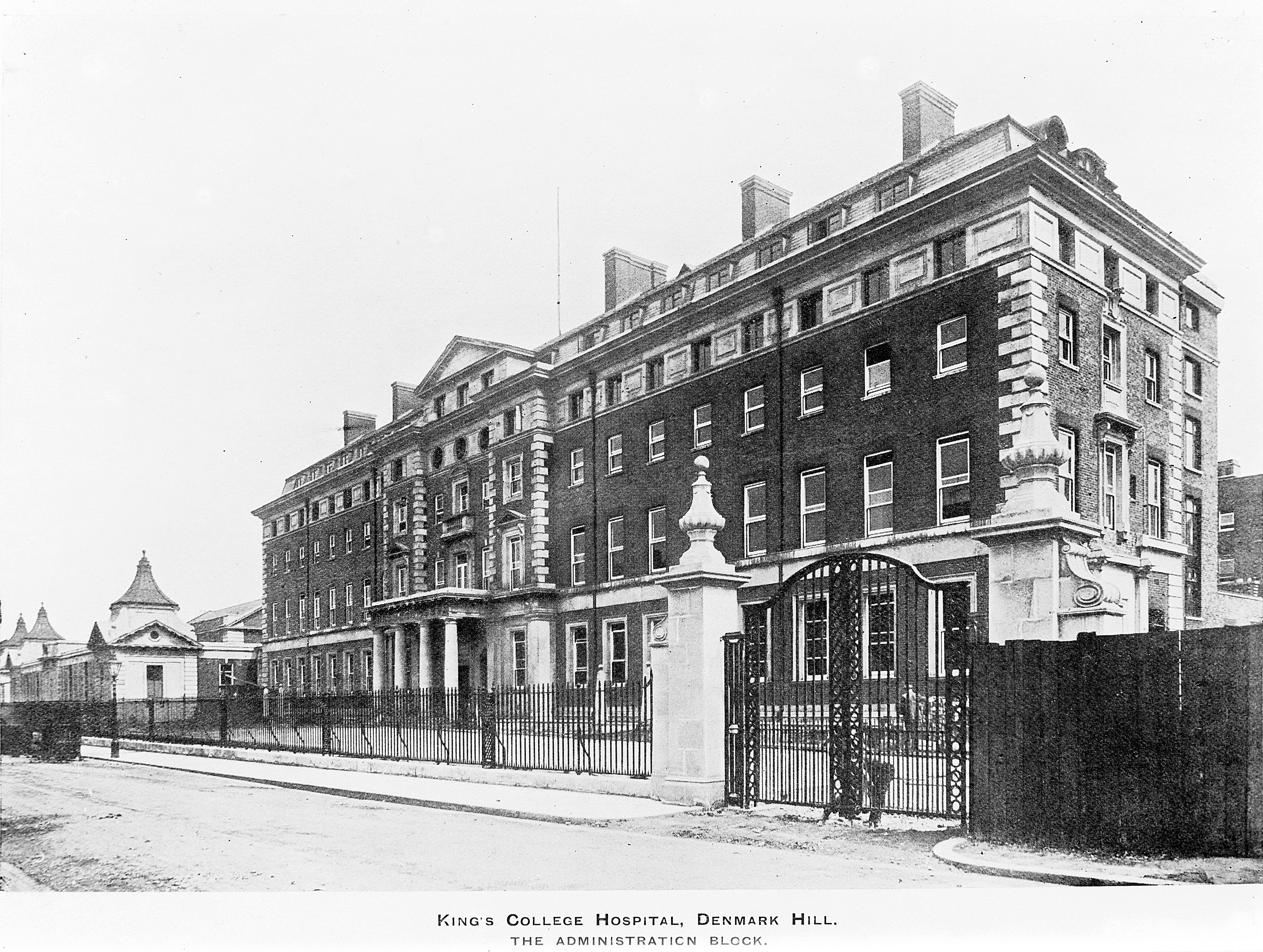
King's College Hospital Administration Building, early 20th century photo

King's was originally opened in 1840 in the disused St Clement Danes workhouse in Portugal Street close to Lincoln's Inn Fields and King's College London itself. It was used as a training facility where medical students of King's College could practice and receive instruction from the college's own professors. The surrounding area there was composed of overcrowded slums characterised by poverty and disease. Within two years of opening, the hospital was treating 1,290 inpatients in 120 beds, with two patients sharing a bed by no means unusual. The main contractor for the new hospital was Lucas Brothers. It was one of the first hospitals to start nurse training, in 1856.

Pioneer of aseptic surgery Joseph Lister performed the first major elective surgery under strict antiseptic conditions in 1877. He helped propel the hospital to have a surgical unit comparable with the best in Europe.

King's College Hospital Act 1904
- Act of Parliament
- Parliament of the United Kingdom
- Long title: An Act to authorise the sale and disposal of the Site of King's College Hospital London and the acquisition of Lands for and Erection of a New Hospital and for other purposes.
- Citation: 4 Edw. 7. c. ccix

Dates
- Royal assent: 15 August 1904

Text of statute as originally enacted

In the first years of the 20th century, demographic changes saw a decrease in the number of patients requiring treatment in the centre of London, and an increase of patients from further afield – notably Camberwell, Peckham and Brixton which were then suburbs on the outskirts of London. Following an act of Parliament, the King's College Hospital Act 1904 (4 Edw. 7. c. ccix), a foundation stone was laid for the new hospital, designed by William Pite, in 1909 at its present site at Denmark Hill, south of the River Thames. The move to Denmark Hill provided the hospital with a greenfield-site nearer to its patients. The new hospital opened in 1913. The building itself incorporated modern design principles to encourage adequate ventilation, used electric clocks throughout, contained only the second internal phone installation in the UK at the time, and generated its own power through the use of diesel engines. The outpatients' department was decorated with nursery rhyme tiles.

Pre-clinical training of medical students remained the responsibility of King's College London, whilst advanced medical training took place at the hospital under the auspices of a newly formed King's College Hospital Medical School.

During the First World War, a large part of the hospital was requisitioned by the War Office to create the 4th London General Hospital, a facility for the Royal Army Medical Corps to treat military casualties. A dental school was established at the same site in 1923. During this time most patients were still poor and highly vulnerable to contagious diseases such as tuberculosis. In 1937 the private Guthrie wing was established with a donation from the Stock Exchange Dramatic and Operatic Society for wealthier patients to enjoy less crowded wards. During the Second World War the hospital was used for treating casualties of air raids, and was fortunate never to sustain a major direct hit. The hospital was the birthplace of Queen Camilla in 1947.

=== Modern history ===
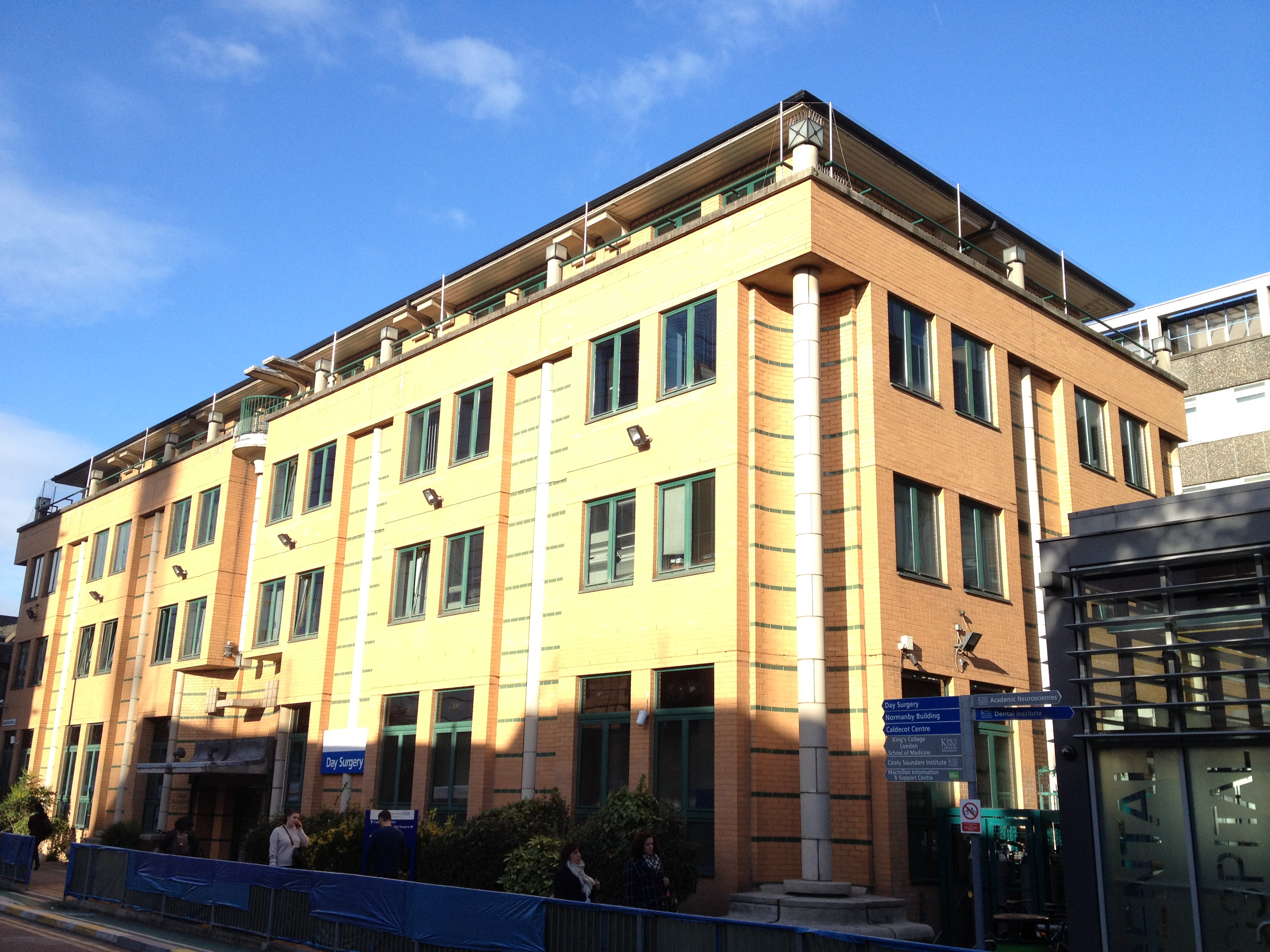
The hospital's Day Surgery building

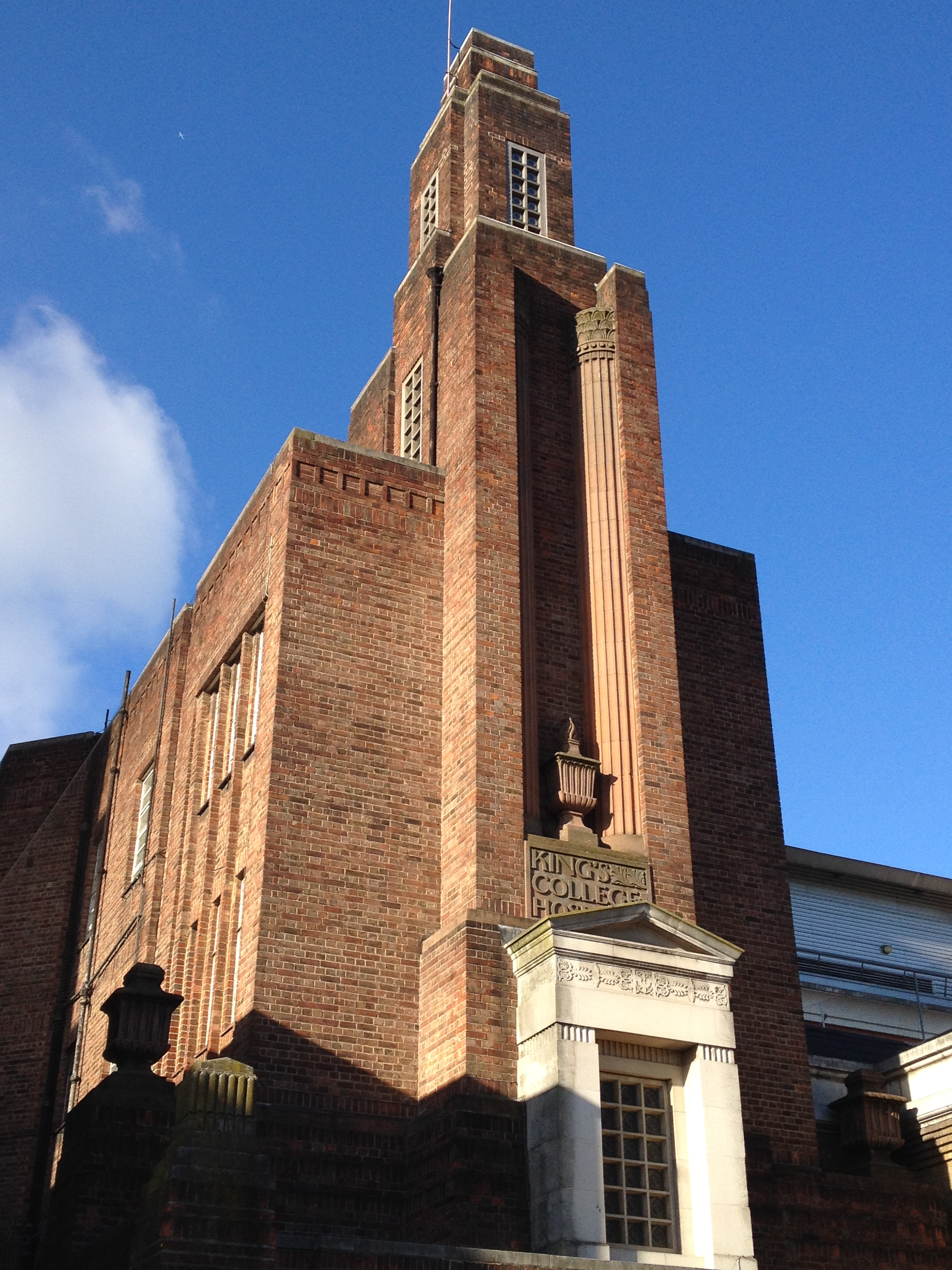
King's College Hospital, entrance to the Guthrie Clinic

Following the creation of the National Health Service in 1948, the hospital was granted Teaching Hospital status. In 1974 the NHS re-organisation saw King's become the centre for all health services management in its catchment area. The hospital's medical school was reunited with King's College in 1983 to form King's College School of Medicine and Dentistry. A purpose-built medical education centre, the Weston Education Centre, was built in 1997 and contains a medical library as well as hosting conferences, symposia, and professional training events as well as containing public access computer rooms for students. In 1998 King's College School of Medicine and Dentistry merged with the United Medical and Dental Schools (UMDS) of Guy's and St Thomas's Hospitals to form Guy's, King's and St Thomas's School of Medicine, commonly abbreviated to "GKT".

The Golden Jubilee wing, intended to host a number of outpatient clinics as well as therapy suites for speech and language, occupational therapy and physiotherapy, was procured under a Private Finance Initiative contract in 2000. The works, which were carried by a joint venture of Costain and Skanska at a cost of £50 million, were completed in 2002.

In December 2013 it was announced that a proposed merger with Guy's and St Thomas' and South London and Maudsley NHS Foundation Trusts had been suspended because of doubts about the reaction of the Competition Commission.

The Trust took over the management of Princess Royal University Hospital in October 2013 after the dissolution of the South London Healthcare NHS Trust. Over Christmas 2013, 8 patients there waited on trolleys for more than 12 hours for admission, the largest number of trolley waits in England.

== Facilities ==
The hospital is situated mainly on Bessemer Road, which is completely contained within the hospital grounds. Although the classically-styled Hambleden Wing Entrance is still the official main entrance, the Golden Jubilee Wing Entrance about 100m to the north-east has become the de facto main entrance, due to it being directly opposite Caldecot Road (where pedestrians arrive from the Coldharbour Lane bus stops) and having the ambulance parking spaces in front of it. There is also the new walk-in A&E Entrance on Bessemer Road (previously located on Denmark Hill), next to the Golden Jubilee Wing and the Denmark Wing entrance and Ambulance Admissions on Denmark Hill (there is no unaccompanied patient access between A&E and the rest of the hospital), whilst on Bessemer Road is the Bessemer Wing Entrance and there is also the Cheyne Wing Entrance on an unnamed service road at the south-west of the main building.

The Trust was one of the first such organisations to introduce a comprehensive public Wi-Fi service, which is free of charge courtesy of the Charitable Trust.

A new outpatient unit with 48 consulting rooms and eight procedure rooms was built in 2022, with Premier Modula using offsite construction methods on a very constrained site.

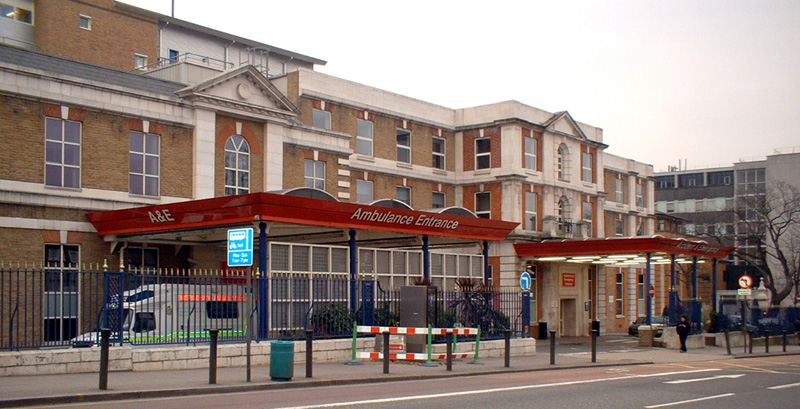
Ambulance entrance

In 2026, the hospital opened its new rooftop intensive care ward, with space for six patients and planting designed by Sarah Price and Nigel Dunnett.

== Location ==
On the opposite side of the A215 (Denmark Hill) is the Maudsley psychiatric hospital, which has close links with King's. The Institute of Psychiatry is nearby and many doctors at King's collaborate with their academic colleagues in carrying out research in conditions such as Parkinson's disease and Motor neurone disease. The Denmark Hill Campus of King's College London is also on Denmark Hill although the main Strand campus is further along the 68 bus route at Aldwych. The nearest railway station is Denmark Hill railway station.

== Media ==
The hospital features in Channel 4's award winning documentary 24 Hours in A&E. The documentary focuses on the hospital's accident and emergency department and is filmed using 70 different cameras strategically placed to capture the workings of the department without interference. It was also the setting for Louis Theroux's 2016 documentary Drinking to Oblivion.

== Notable alumni ==
- James W. Black (1924–2010) – Nobel Prize for Medicine winner 1988 for his contribution to discoveries of important principles for drug treatment
- William Bowman (1816–1892) – Ophthalmic surgeon, helped found Ophthalmological Society of the United Kingdom
- John Leonard Dawson (1932–1999) – Serjeant Surgeon to the Royal Household of the United Kingdom
- William Fergusson (1808–1877) – Surgeon, introduced practice of conservative amputation
- David Ferrier (1843–1928) – Pioneering experimental neurologist
- Henrietta Hannath RRC and Bar (1863–1939) – British Nursing Leader and Military Nurse
- Kate Evelyn Luard, RRC (1872–1962) – British Nurse and author, trained at Kings College Hospital from 1897-1900.
- Robert Daniel Lawrence (1892–1968) – co-founder of Diabetes UK
- Henry Lee (1817–1898) – surgeon, pathologist and syphilologist
- Joseph Lister (1827–1912) – Pioneer of antiseptic surgery
- Victor Negus (1887–1974) – Laryngologist and comparative anatomist
- Robert McCance (1898–1993) – Effects of salt deficiency, iron regulation mechanism, The Chemical Composition of Foods, modern nutrition
- Dhani Ram Prem (1904–1979) – the first Asian councillor of Birmingham and winner of Padma Shri
- Audrey Smith (1915–1981) – cryobiologist
- Robert Bentley Todd (1809–1860) – Todd was the first to apply Michael Faraday’s concepts of the polar forces of electricity and magnetism to the brain, laying the foundations of the modern understanding of the electrical basis of brain activity and developing the first electrical theory of epilepsy.
- Andy Williams (1964–) – Knee and sports surgeon specialising in ligament injuries and known for treating Premier League footballers.

== See also ==
- Healthcare in London
- List of hospitals in England
- King's Health Partners
- List of NHS trusts
- John Cutting (psychiatrist)
- Guy's Hospital
- Maudsley Hospital
- St Thomas' Hospital
- King's College London GKT School of Medical Education
- Francis Crick Institute
