= Guy's and St Thomas' NHS Foundation Trust =

UK public sector healthcare provider in London, England (1993- )

- Type: NHS foundation trust
- Established: 1993
- Hospitals: Evelina London Children's Hospital; Guy's Hospital; Harefield Hospital; Royal Brompton Hospital; St Thomas' Hospital
- Staff: 23,700 (2024/25)
- Website: www.guysandstthomas.nhs.uk

Guy's and St Thomas' NHS Foundation Trust is an NHS foundation trust of the English National Health Service, one of the prestigious Shelford Group. It runs Guy's Hospital in London Bridge, St Thomas' Hospital in Waterloo, Evelina London Children's Hospital, two specialist heart and lung hospitals, Royal Brompton and Harefield and community services in Lambeth, Southwark and Lewisham.

== History ==
Guy's Hospital was first established as an NHS Trust including University Hospital Lewisham but in 1993 Lewisham became independent and Guy's and St Thomas' joined together.

In December 2013 it was announced that a proposed merger with King's College Hospital and South London and Maudsley NHS Foundation Trust foundation trusts had been suspended because of doubts about the reaction of the Competition Commission. In 2019 it was closely involved with Kings, with which it shares its chair, Sir Hugh Taylor, its strategy director and IT director.

In 2022 the outstanding maintenance bill was £463 million, the second largest in the English NHS.

== Facilities ==
The trust has one of the eleven Genomics Medicines Centres associated with Genomics England which opened across England in February 2014.

The trust is a partner in Viapath a London-based provider of pathology services jointly owned with Serco, and King's College Hospital NHS Foundation Trust.

It is one of the biggest provider of specialised services in England, which generated an income of £383.7 million in 2014/5.

In October 2018 it had to impose geographical limits on specialist paediatric referrals for dermatology and urology after a large increase in referrals from North London, Kent and Sussex made the waiting times unmanageable.

It made a contract with Johnson & Johnson in 2017 to open eight new operating theatres by 2020. The first one opened in April 2019. This was part of a plan for an Orthopaedic Centre of Excellence in a deal worth up to £310 million, but the plan was dropped in 2022 because of the 'impact of covid'.

In 2021, the trust launched the UK's first multidisciplinary Klinefelter's syndrome clinic speciality for young people aged 16-21. Based at the Rare Diseases Centre at St Thomas Hospital, the clinic brings medical specialities in a single service.

=== Private patients ===
The Trust offers a range of services privately including assisted conception, services for children and maternity. Other complex care specialities including cardiology, vascular and thoracic surgery, gynaecology, general surgery and medicine are available at the Westminster Unit. Guy's and St Thomas' Specialist Care also specialise in adult and children's renal transplantation and operate one of the largest programmes in Europe.

The Trust built a £100 million integrated cancer centre in conjunction with HCA Healthcare near London Bridge in 2016.

The Trust entered into a contract with Johnson & Johnson in November 2017 for £310 million thought to run for 10 years. It includes a "managed service agreement" for the procurement of prosthetics, surgical instruments and other consumables for orthopaedic surgery and the development of eight new operating theatres on the Guy's hospital site.

== Controversies ==
=== 2022 IT systems failure ===
On Tuesday, 19 July 2022, during the UK and wider European heatwaves of 2022, the IT systems of Guy's and St Thomas failed due to extreme operating temperatures. Two data centres within the hospital trust failed, causing mass IT outages across the hospital's sites including those at Guy's London Bridge hospital and St. Thomas' Waterloo hospital. Mostly resolved after three weeks, the impact of care-critical systems going down, including the ability to digitally send prescriptions, order X-rays, or run cancer clinics, have raised questions whether the current system is fit for purpose. Issues relating to inadequate IT systems were raised in a previous board meeting in November 2021.

== See also ==
- List of NHS trusts
