= Orpington Hospital =

- King's College Hospital NHS Foundation Trust
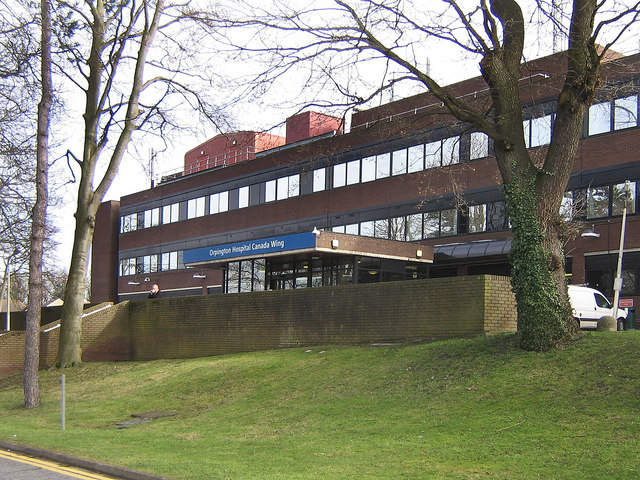
- Orpington Hospital

- Shown in Bromley

Geography
- Location: Orpington, London, England, United Kingdom
- Coordinates: 51.3622°N 0.0950°E

Organisation
- Care system: NHS England
- Type: District General

Services
- Emergency department: No Accident & Emergency

History
- Founded: 1916

Links
- Website: pruh.kch.nhs.uk
- Lists: Hospitals in England

Orpington Hospital is an acute general hospital in Orpington, London. It is managed by the King's College Hospital NHS Foundation Trust.

== History ==
The hospital has its origins in a military hospital built for soldiers originating from the Province of Ontario during the First World War. It opened as the Ontario Military Hospital in February 1916. An extra wing was completed in July 1917 and it was re-designated No 16 Canadian General Hospital in September 1917. After the First World War it became a hospital for disabled servicemen, taking the name 'Ministry of Pensions Orpington Hospital', and it served as an Emergency Medical Service Hospital during the Second World War. It joined the National Health Service as Orpington Hospital in 1948. The Canada Wing was officially opened by the Canadian High Commissioner in 1983. The accident and emergency department closed in 1983 but then a treatment centre opened in 2003.
