= Princess Royal University Hospital =

- King's College Hospital NHS Foundation Trust
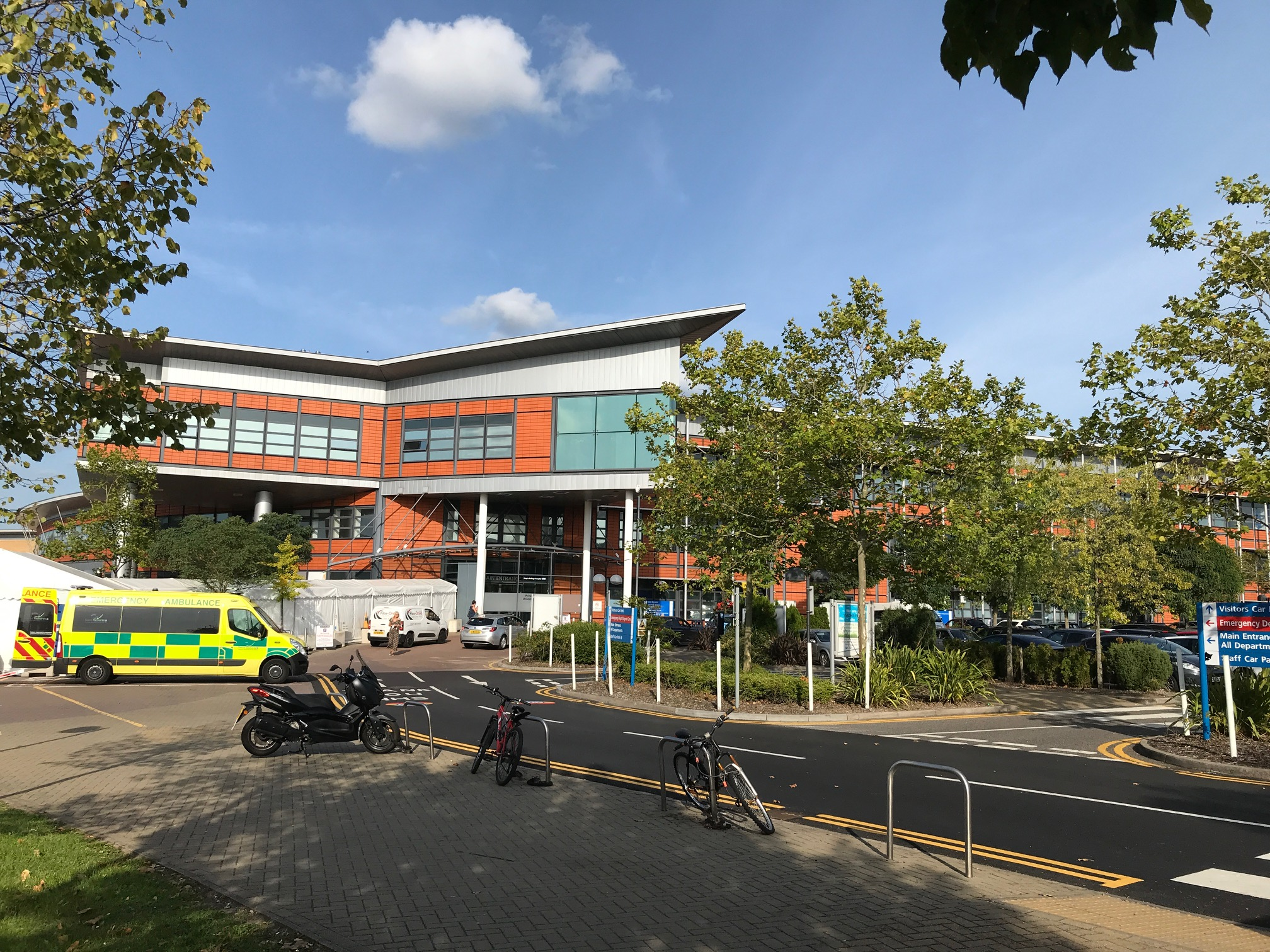
- Main entrance

Geography
- Location: Locksbottom, London, England
- Coordinates: 51°21′55″N 0°3′13″E

Organisation
- Care system: National Health Service

Services
- Emergency department: Yes
- Beds: 525

History
- Founded: 1844

Links
- Website: pruh.kch.nhs.uk

Princess Royal University Hospital (PRUH) is a large district general hospital in Locksbottom, near Farnborough in the London Borough of Bromley. It is managed by King's College Hospital NHS Foundation Trust.

== History ==
The hospital has its origins in the Bromley Union Workhouse Infirmary which was opened on the site in March 1845. A female infirmary block was added in 1898 and two new medical blocks were completed in 1929.

A new wing was added in 1936 at which time the facility became the Farnborough County Hospital. It joined the National Health Service as Farnborough General Hospital in 1948 and new operating theatres on the site were opened by Robin Turton, Minister of Health, in November 1956.

A new hospital was procured under a Private Finance Initiative contract to replace the Bromley Hospital and Farnborough General Hospital in 1998. It was built by Taylor Woodrow at a cost of £118 million and opened in April 2003. The construction cost was funded partly by the sale of the land occupied by Bromley Hospital, and partly by the private finance initiative project. Taxpayers will end up paying £1.2 billion to the PFI owners in a deal which lasts for 60 years.

The new hospital was initially administered by the Bromley Hospitals NHS Trust, until a merger with Queen Elizabeth Hospital NHS Trust and Queen Mary's Sidcup NHS Trust created the South London Healthcare NHS Trust in April 2009, which took over the running of several other hospitals in the local area.

A Hyper Acute Stroke Unit for South East London opened at the hospital in May 2011.

== 2013 Takeover ==
The South London Healthcare NHS Trust was dissolved on 1 October 2013, following a decision by the then Health Secretary Jeremy Hunt, acting on advice from the Trust Special Administrator. The accumulated debt owed on both the Princess Royal and Queen Elizabeth hospitals was written off by the Department for Health. King's College Hospital NHS Foundation Trust then took over responsibility for the Princess Royal University Hospital and Orpington Hospital, as well as responsibility for running some clinical services at Queen Mary's Hospital, Sidcup, Beckenham Beacon and Sevenoaks Hospital.
