= King's College Hospital NHS Foundation Trust =

National health trust in London, England

- Type: NHS foundation trust
- Established: 1 November 1991
- Headquarters: Denmark Hill, London, England
- Hospitals: Beckenham Beacon; King's College Hospital; Orpington Hospital; Princess Royal University Hospital
- Staff: 14,939 WTE (2024/25)
- Website: www.kch.nhs.uk

King's College Hospital NHS Foundation Trust is an NHS trust in London, England. It is closely involved with Guy's and St Thomas' NHS Foundation Trust, with which it shares its chair, Sir Hugh Taylor, its strategy director and IT director. It is assumed that the two organisations will eventually merge.

== History ==
The trust was established as the King's Healthcare NHS Trust on 1 November 1991, and became operational on 1 April 1993. After being awarded foundation trust status, it became the King's College Hospital NHS Foundation Trust in 2006.

== Performance ==
In March 2015 it had a very large backlog of patients waiting more than 18 weeks for treatment. Monitor launched an investigation into the trust because of 'long standing problems' at Princess Royal University Hospital in March 2015. Financial problems are attributed to urgent improvements to the quality of care there, including increasing the nurse-to-patient ratio by recruiting 260 new nurses. In March 2018 it was the eleventh worst performer in A&E in England, with only 61.8% of patients in the main A&E seen within 4 hours. In February 2019 it had 331 patients waiting more than 52 weeks for treatment, mostly in orthopaedics and bariatric surgery, twice as many as any other trust in England. It plans to outsource some of the bariatric work to Princess Grace Hospital, run by HCA Healthcare and some to Chelsea and Westminster Hospital NHS Foundation Trust.

=== Finance ===
The trust expected to finish 2015–16 with a deficit of more than £65 million partly as a result of changes to the NHS tariff. It was said to be the least efficient hospital in England according to Lord Carter's review of NHS efficiency, with potential savings of £154 million a year. In December 2017 it was placed in financial special measures and Lord Bob Kerslake, Chair of the trust, resigned. The organisation's chief operating officer and finance director had resigned in November. The Chief Executive resigned in March 2018 at a point when the annual forecast deficit is expected to worsen to more than £100 million. The trust is carrying underlying debts of more than £600 million.

It forecast a deficit of £156 million for 2018-19 - the largest of any NHS trust. The chief executive, chair, finance director and chief operating officer all resigned in 2017–8. By March 2019 the projected deficit was around £191 million.

== Commercial ventures ==
The trust used its commercial arm, KCH Management, to open a clinic in Abu Dhabi in November 2014. KCH along with its investment management company Ashmore Group opened a 100-bed hospital for inpatients and outpatients in Dubai in 2019. It has an agreement with Indo UK Healthcare Private to create an institute of health in New Chandigarh where a 500-bed hospital, trauma centre and day surgery centre will also be built. The trust will be paid by a fixed fee, profit share arrangements, equity stakes and consultancy work and hopes to generate £40m over 15 years.

The trust is a partner in Viapath a London-based provider of pathology services jointly owned with Serco, and Guy's and St Thomas' NHS Foundation Trust.

In 2011 it was reported that the trust was paid around £1m for the sale of NHS donor livers to overseas private patients. Controversy arose around this practice after a 2009 review by the Organ Donations Taskforce, commissioned by the UK government's Department of Health had already recommended a ban on the practice and stated that 'Financial gain from the transplant of donated organs feels morally wrong'.

In 2016 the trust established a subsidiary company, King's Interventional Facilities Management LLP, jointly owned by the trust and its subsidiary Kings Commercial Services Ltd, to which 99 estates and facilities staff were transferred. The intention was to achieve VAT benefits, as well as pay bill savings, by recruiting new staff on less expensive non-NHS contracts. VAT benefits arise because NHS trusts can only claim VAT back on a small subset of goods and services they buy. The Value Added Tax Act 1994 provides a mechanism through which NHS trusts can qualify for refunds on contracted out services.

The trust expanded its private patient unit from 21 to 46 beds in 2017. About 45% of the revenue comes from overseas, mainly from liver transplants.

It sold its assisted conception unit to the Fetal Medicine Foundation and a company called King's Fertility for a total of £26 million in June 2017. Kypros Nicolaides, a foetal medicine consultant at the trust, is a director of both organisations.

In 2018-19 the trust wrote off overseas patient debts of £4.3 million and British private patient debts of £800,000. Its total private patient income was £20.6 million.

== Tertiary care specialities ==
It is one of the biggest provider of specialised services in England, which generated an income of £308.8 million in 2014–5.

King's Liver Unit is the most comprehensive service of its kind in the world, with a strong interest in paediatric liver cancers. King's also operates the largest liver transplantion programme in Europe.

There is a great deal of expertise within King's Department of Neurology/Neurosciences. There is a large outpatient movement disorder clinic, specialising in multidisciplinary team management of Parkinson's disease, dystonia, progressive supranuclear palsy, and related diseases. It is one of only five centres in the European Union designated a "Centre of Excellence" by the National Parkinson Foundation. In 1995 the hospital established the UK's first specialist Motor Neurone Disease Care & Research Centre, a model of care which has since been reproduced at other centres throughout the United Kingdom.

The hospital is also home to the only dedicated diverticular disease clinic.
