= Mell (name) =

Mell is a given name and a surname. Notable persons with that name include:

== Persons with the given name ==
- Mell Kilpatrick (1902–1962), American photographer
- Mell Lazarus (1927–2016), American cartoonist
- Mell Reasco (born 2002), Ecuadorian tennis player

== Persons with the surname ==
- Davis Mell (1604-1662), English clockmaker and violinist
- Deb Mell (born 1968), American politician, daughter of Richard Mell
- Eila Mell, American fashion journalist
- Gertrud Maria Mell (1947–2016), Swedish musician, composer, and sea captain
- John Mell, 1670s English hospital "keeper"
- Luísa Mell (born 1978), Brazilian actress and businesswoman
- Marisa Mell (1939–1992), Austrian actress
- Max Mell (1882–1971), Austrian writer
- Randle Mell, American actor, ex-husband of Mary McDonnell
- Richard Mell (born 1938), American politician, father of Deb Mell
- Robert Mell (1872–1941), British trade unionist and politician
- Rudolf Mell (1878–1970), German zoologist and entomologist
- Stewart Mell (born 1957), English footballer

== Fictional characters ==
- Mell Rhodes, a character from the visual novel The House in Fata Morgana

== See also ==
- Mell (disambiguation)
