= Mel =

Mel, Mels or MEL may refer to:

== Biology ==
- Mouse erythroleukemia cell line (MEL)
- National Herbarium of Victoria, a herbarium with the Index Herbariorum code MEL

== People ==
- Mel (given name) (including a list of people with the name)
- Mel (surname)
- Manuel Zelaya, former president of Honduras, nicknamed "Mel"
- Mél of Ardagh (died 488), early Irish missionary and founder of the diocese of Ardagh

== Places ==
- Mel, Veneto, an ex-comune in Italy
- Mel Moraine, a moraine in Antarctica
- Melbourne Airport (IATA airport code)
- Mels, a municipality in Switzerland
- Métropole Européenne de Lille (MEL), the intercommunality of Lille in France

== Technology and engineering ==
- Maya Embedded Language, a scripting language used in the 3D graphics program Maya
- Michigan eLibrary, an online service of the Library of Michigan
- Ford MEL engine, a "Mercury-Edsel-Lincoln" engine series
- Minimum equipment list, a categorized list of instruments and equipment on an aircraft
- Miscellaneous electric load, the electricity use of appliances, electronics and other small electric devices in buildings

== Arts and entertainment ==
- Mel (film), a 1998 film with Ernest Borgnine
- Mel (album), a 1979 album by Maria Bethânia
- Portal Stories: Mel, a mod of the video game Portal 2

== Other uses ==
- Mel languages, spoken in western Africa
- Mel scale, a scale for measuring auditory pitches as perceived by the human ear
- Meldreth railway station, a British railway station with station code MEL
- Melling Line (timetable code: MEL), New Zealand
- Melton railway station, Melbourne
- Midland Expressway Ltd, operator of the UK M6 Toll road
- Musical Electronics Library, a lending library of homemade electronic musical devices in New Zealand
- Mullard Equipment Limited, a former British electronics company
- Minimum Equipment List, a regulation for airplanes - see Master minimum equipment list
- MEL, an online men's magazine
- Honey, as often shown in ingredients with its Latin name

== See also ==
- Mel's (disambiguation)
- Melvin Purvis (1903–1960), American law enforcement official nicknamed "Little Mel"
- Mels
- Mell (disambiguation)
