= Bryan Charnley =

British artist (1949-1991)

- Bryan Charnley in his studio, June 1991. James Charnley
- Born: 20 September 1949; Stockton-on-Tees
- Died: July 1991 (aged 41); Bedford
- Education: Central School of Art and Design
- Notable work: See the website bryancharnley.com and the book Bryan Charnley: Art and Adversity
- Website: bryancharnley.com

Bryan Charnley (1949–1991) was a British artist diagnosed with schizophrenia, who explored its effects in his work. He took his life in July 1991 after completing the Self Portrait Series. The seventeen paintings in the series were exhibited at the National Portrait Gallery, July - December 1995. Thirty of his paintings are in the Wellcome Collection in London with others in the Bethlem Museum of the Mind and private collections worldwide.

== Early life and flower paintings ==
During his early career Charnley drew heavily on photo-realism — then enjoying popularity in America — rather than the conceptual art that was fashionable in the London art scene, and he produced many large-scale paintings of flowers. He was also interested in the work of Bridget Riley, in which he discipline' combined with a strong emotional charge.

== Relationship with Pam Jones ==
In 1982 Charnley painted a double portrait of himself and his partner Pam, in what has been called "the high point of [his] photorealistic early period". The composition and treatment demonstrates his interest in the work of David Hockney. Five years later Pam – who also experienced mental illness – attempted suicide by jumping out of a window. Though she survived, her spine was badly damaged. Charnley's trauma is explored in his painting of the same year, Leaving by the Window.

== Stylistic development ==
Writing in 1988, he said he had "found [himself] on an interior journey in which landscape and subject were subsumed to inner vision".

In 1984 four of his paintings were purchased by the Bethlem Royal Hospital for its permanent collection. During this period he studied the work of other artists held in the same collection, notably William Kurelek and Louis Wain, whose work "seemed to me to have a power to move far beyond that expected of the patient as an artist. Here I saw art stripped of all esoteric and conceptual pretensions".

Several of his paintings – including To the Farm, Grey Self-Portrait and Broach Schizophrene – are held in the collections of the Bethlem Museum of the Mind, and others are in the Wellcome Collection.

== Final works and death ==
Charnley decided early in 1991 to paint a series of self-portraits chronicling his experience as he reduced his medication. Marjorie Wallace, a journalist and the chief executive of the charity SANE, encouraged Charnley to keep a diary of his progress. Charnley made the diary an integral part of the portraits using the text to explain the imagery he was using and to describe his existential state. The Self Portrait Series consists of seventeen paintings. The last two paintings have no diary entries. The penultimate portrait is a map of a battlefield and the last self portrait dated 19.7. 91 is entirely abstract

== Exhibitions ==
- Bryan Charnley, Dryden Street Gallery, London, 1989
- Visions, Royal College of Art, London 1990 (group exhibition)
- Crossing the Border, Harris Art Gallery and Museum, Preston 1995
- Bryan Charnley: Self Portrait Face to Face with Schizophrenia, National Portrait Gallery 1995
- Bryan Charnley The Art of Schizophrenia, Bethlem Museum of the Mind, 2015

== Gallery ==
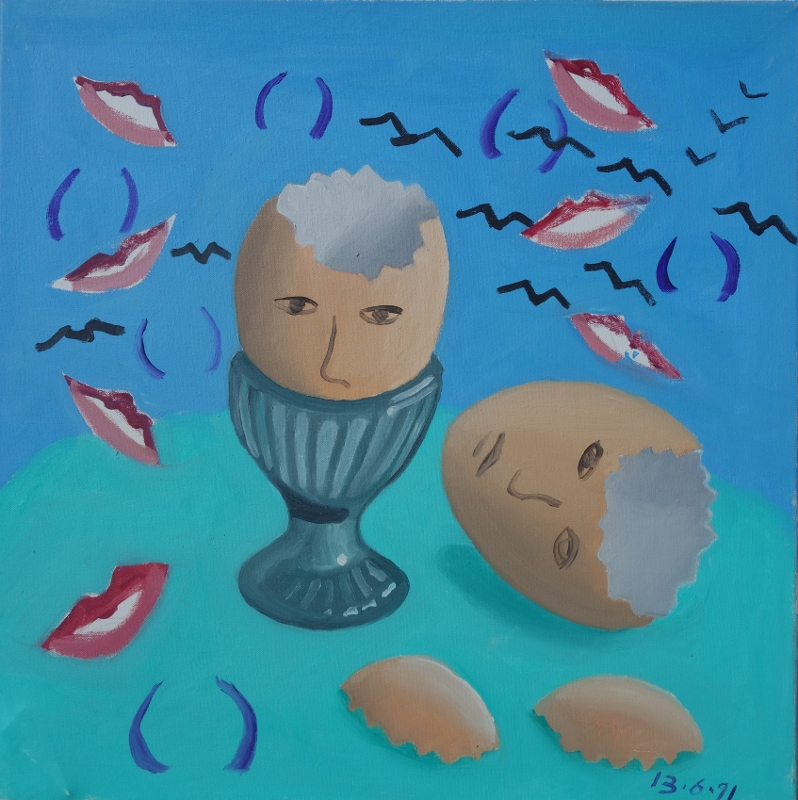
Self Portrait (1991); oil on canvas, 51 x 51 cm

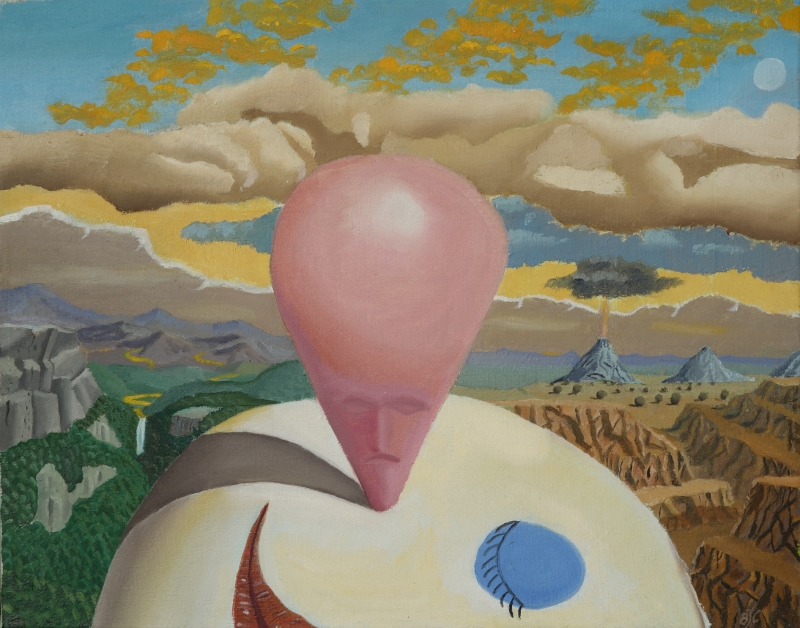
Clown in a Landscape, 1983; oil on canvas, 40 x 50 cm

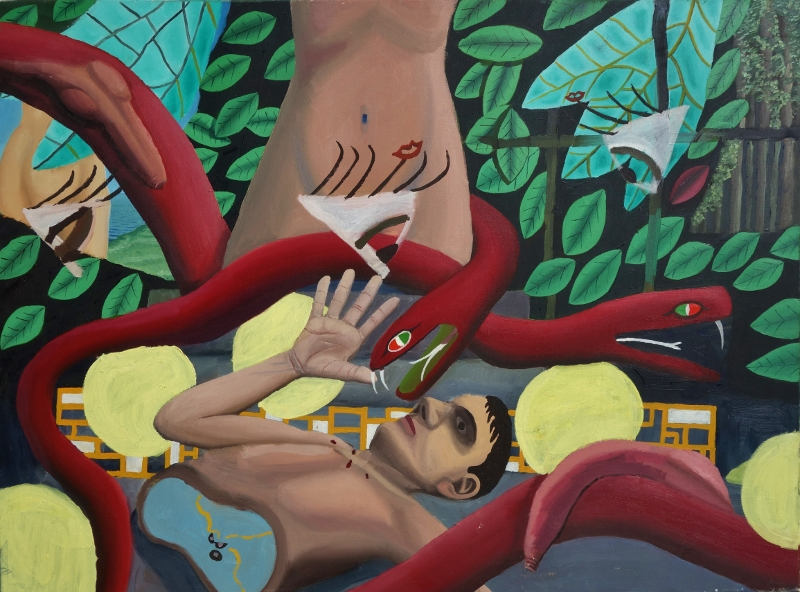
Jealousy; oil on canvas, 76 x 101 cm
