= Bethlem Gallery =

Gallery in Beckenham, Bromley, England

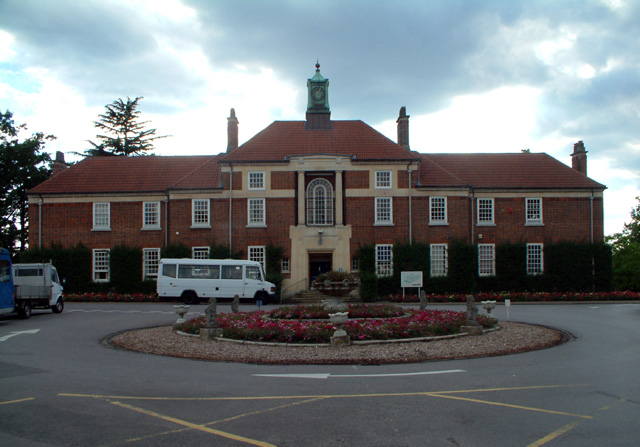
- Main building of Bethlem Royal Hospital, which houses the Bethlem Museum of the Mind and the Bethlem Gallery
- Formation: 1997
- Type: Subsidiary of the Maudsley Charity (UK registered number 1055440-3)
- Location: Monks Orchard Road, Beckenham, London BR3 3BX, United Kingdom
- Coordinates: 51°22′51.3″N 0°1′46.9″W
- Region served: National
- Method: Exhibitions and events are programmed throughout the year; Campaign for access to the arts in healthcare environments
- Key people: Sophie Leighton, Gallery Director
- Website: www.bethlemgallery.com

The Bethlem Gallery is an art gallery in Beckenham, Bromley, England. It was established in 1997 to support and exhibit artists who are current or former patients of the South London and Maudsley NHS Foundation Trust. The gallery is housed in an Art Deco building shared with the Bethlem Museum of the Mind, with exhibits about the history of Bethlem Royal Hospital.

The small gallery team supports and encourages artists who may feel excluded from artistic endeavour otherwise. The gallery provides facilities for collaboration, experimentation, and skills exchange.

== Quotation ==
Pills are ok, counselling is ok and it will get you back on the streets, but what keeps your mind alive is what you learn here. That’s what it’s about – keeping your spirit alive.

– Lee, Bethlem artist.

== Studio ==
For long term patients, the art studio is a place to spend time away from the ward.

Available resources facilitate sculpture, painting, drawing, printmaking and screen printing, among others.

== See also ==
- Bethlem Royal Hospital
