= John Monro (physician) =

English physician (1716–1791)

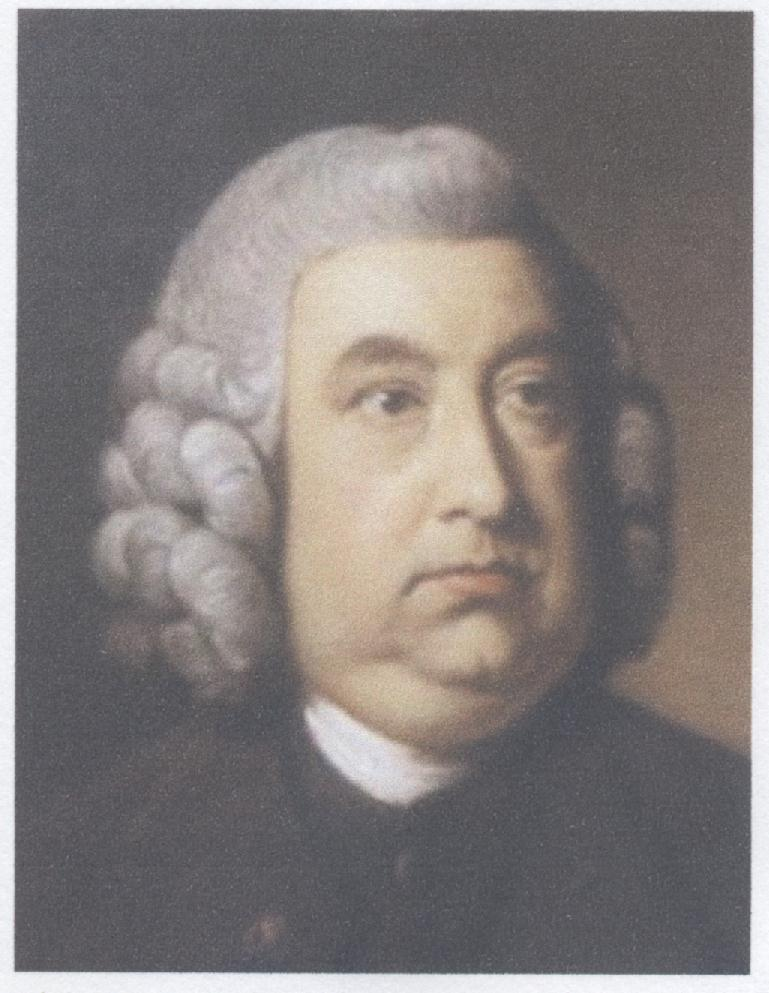

John Monro (16 November 1716 – 27 December 1791) was a physician specializing in the treatment of madness at Bethlem Hospital in London, better known as Bedlam.

== Family ==
John Monro was the eldest son of James Monro, who was the physician of the Bethlem Hospital until his death in 1752, and his wife Elizabeth. James was the first of the Monro family of physicians who formed a dynasty of mad-doctors between 1728 and 1855.

Monro had four sons with his wife, Elizabeth: John, Charles, James, and Thomas and a daughter Charlotte.

== Career ==
John Monro graduated from St John's College, Oxford in 1737 and received a Radcliffe travelling fellowship that enabled him to study in Europe for 10 years, which included Edinburgh, Leiden, Paris and Rome. He was formally appointed as a joint physician at Bethlem and Bridewell in 1751 to aid his ailing father, although he had been a governor since 1748, and as a physician when his father died a year later. He became a fellow of the Royal College of Physicians in 1753.

Bethlem had lost its institutional monopoly for the treatment of insanity by the creation of St Luke's Hospital for Lunatics in 1751, and in 1758, he quickly responded to William Battie, the physician of this hospital, who published a Treatise on Madness in 1758, which appeared to criticise the practices of Bethlem. His Remarks on Dr Battie's Treatise have been characterised as narrow and reactionary but he has recently been defended in the first biography published about him in recent years.

"Notwithstanding we are told in this treatise, that madness rejects all general methods, I will venture to say, that the most adequate and constant cure of it is by evacuation; which can alone be determined by the constitution of the patient and the judgment of the physician. The evacuation by vomiting is infinitely preferable to any other, if repeated experience is to be depended on..."

One criticism of Bedlam at this time was that it allowed paying visitors to observe the lunatics, and despite the banning of this practice at St. Luke's, Monro didn't restrict it until 1770.

== Cultural depictions ==
In Queen Charlotte: A Bridgerton Story, John Monro is portrayed by Guy Henry. Monro is depicted as a doctor to King George III, who attempts to treat the King's mental illness by subjecting him to torture.
