= Bethlem Museum of the Mind =

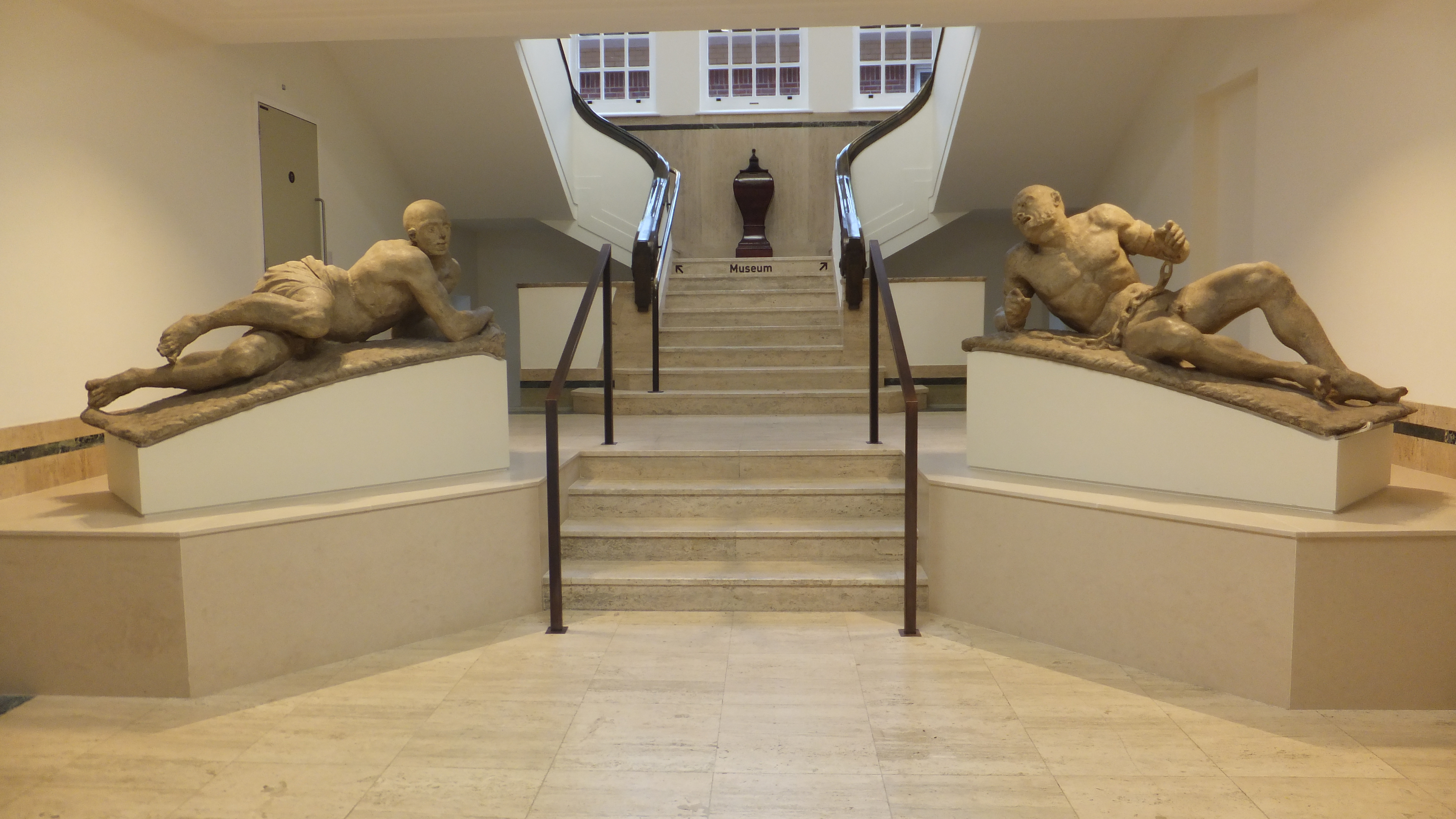
- Melancholy and Raving Madness statues
- Established: 2015
- Location: Bethlem Royal Hospital, Monks Orchard Road, Beckenham, London Borough of Bromley
- Coordinates: 51°22′51.3″N 0°1′46.9″W
- Type: Medical museum, art museum
- Website: museumofthemind.org.uk

Bethlem Museum of the Mind is a museum focusing on the history of Bethlem Royal Hospital, its programme of care, and its patients. Opened in 2015, the museum is housed in an Art Deco building shared with the Bethlem Gallery, which hosts exhibitions of contemporary artists who are current or former patients.

The museum's displays include work by artists who have suffered from mental health problems, such as former patients William Kurelek, Richard Dadd and Louis Wain. Another work is a pair of statues by Caius Gabriel Cibber known as Raving and Melancholy Madness, from the gates of the 17th century Bethlem Hospital. Other displays illustrate the history of mental healthcare.

The museum is a member of the London Museums of Health & Medicine.

== Archives ==
The museum cares for extensive archives from Bethlem Hospital, Maudsley Hospital and Warlingham Park Hospital, and some of the archives of Bridewell Hospital. There are documents dating back to the 16th century. The archives are open for inspection by appointment, subject to the laws of confidentiality governing recent patient records.

== History ==
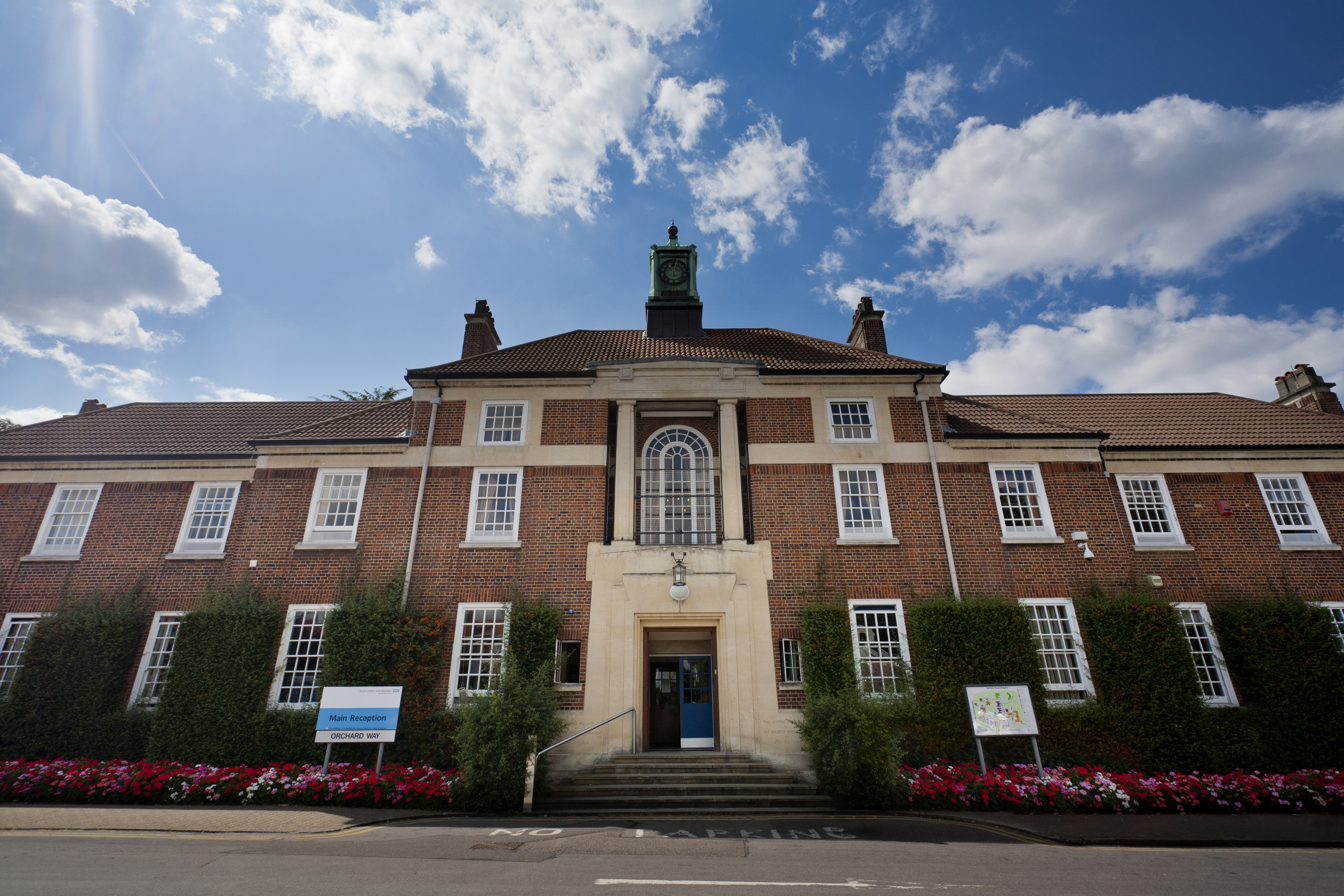
Main building of Bethlem Royal Hospital, which houses the Bethlem Museum of the Mind and the Bethlem Gallery

Since 1970, there had been a small museum at the hospital that mainly displayed items from the hospital's art collection. Due to the restricted size of the former museum, known as the "Bethlem Royal Hospital Archives and Museum", only a small fraction of the collections could be displayed at a time.

The inaugural temporary exhibition was Bryan Charnley: the Art of Schizophrenia, a monographic show on the artist (and former Bethlem patient) Bryan Charnley.

In April 2016 the museum was shortlisted for the Museum of the Year award, alongside the Victoria and Albert Museum (the eventual winner), the Arnolfini, York Art Gallery and Jupiter Artland sculpture park and gallery.
