= Mells =

Mells may refer to:

- Mells, Somerset, England, UK
- Mells, Suffolk, England, UK
- Meols, The Wirral, England, UK (identical pronunciation i.e. /ˈmɛlz/)

== See also ==
- Mell (disambiguation)
- Mel's (disambiguation)
- Mels
