= Mell (disambiguation) =

Mell is a Japanese singer.

Mell may also refer to:

- Melanie Münch (born 1981), German singer
- Mell (name), a given name and surname (including a list of people with the name)
- Mell, Drogheda, a former town in Ireland
- Mell, Kentucky, an unincorporated community in Kentucky, United States

== See also ==
- Mells (disambiguation)
- Mel (disambiguation)
- Arish Mell, small embayment and beach in Dorset, England
- Mag Mell, a realm in Irish mythology
