= Mel's =

Mel's may refer to:

- Mel's Diner, the setting for the 1976–1985 TV series Alice
- Mel's Drive-In, a restaurant chain
- Mel's Hole, an urban legend about a geographic anomaly

== See also ==
- Mel (disambiguation)
- MEL (disambiguation)
- Mells (disambiguation)
- Mels
- St. Mel's
