= James Monro (physician) =

Scottish physician

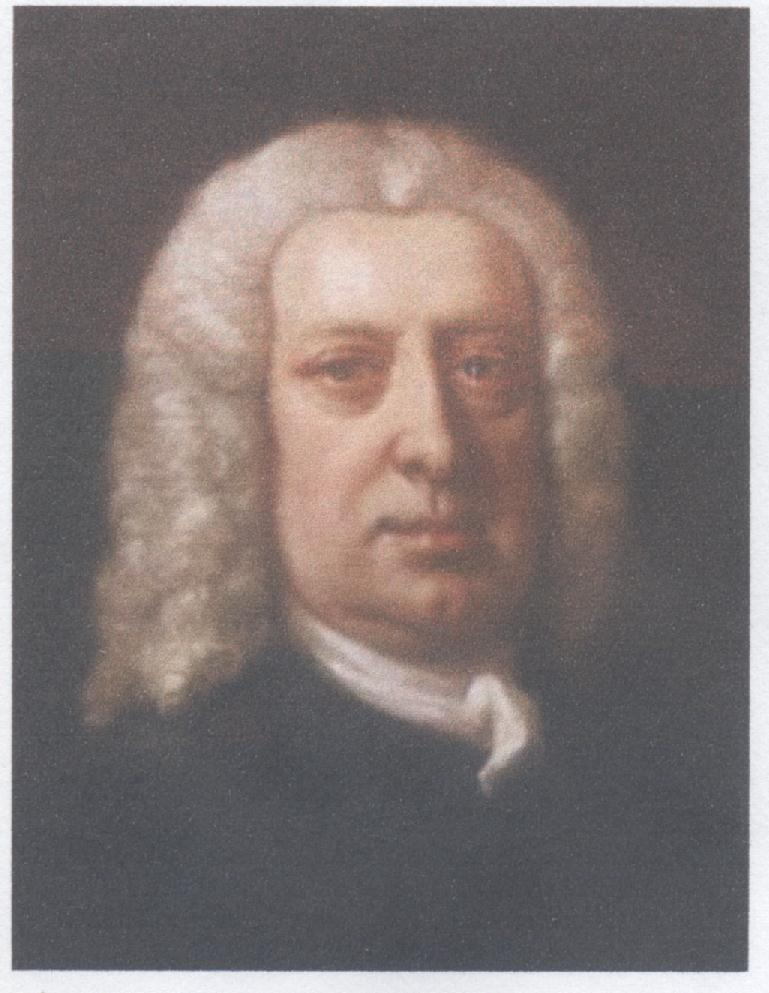
- Born: 2 September 1680; Scotland
- Died: 4 November 1752 (aged 72); Sunninghill, Berkshire
- Occupation: Physician

James Monro (2 September 1680 – 4 November 1752) was a Scottish physician.

== Biography ==
Monro was born in Scotland on 2 September 1680. He was the son of Alexander Monro. He came to London with his father in 1691, and matriculated at Balliol College, Oxford, 8 July 1699, graduating B.A. 15 June 1703, M.A. 3 June 1708, M.B. 25 May 1709. He does not appear to have practised medicine, at least in London, till middle life, since it was not till 9 July 1722 that he took the degree of M.D., and six years later, 23 December 1728, was admitted candidate of the College of Physicians of London, succeeding to the fellowship 22 December 1729. He was elected physician to Bethlehem Hospital for lunatics 9 October 1728, which appointment he held till his death. For the rest of his life he devoted himself to the treatment of insanity. He is said to have been a skilful and honourable physician. His policy in not admitting students or physicians to the practice of his hospital was the subject of hostile criticism in Dr. Battle's treatise on 'Madness' (London, 1758, 4to), and was defended in a pamphlet by his son John Monro, who is separately noticed. James Monro's only literary production was the Harveian oration at the College of Physicians in 1737. He died 4 November 1752, at Sunninghill, Berkshire, and is buried there. A portrait of him is in the College of Physicians.

Monro married on 22 February 1707, Elizabeth (died 20 November 1753) the only child of Thomas Hay (died 1734), Solicitor in Chancery. Their children included Dr. John Monro and Thomas Monro (1716–81).
