= Bethlem Royal Hospital =

Psychiatric hospital in London, England

Coordinates: 51°22′51″N 00°01′46″W

- South London and Maudsley NHS Foundation Trust
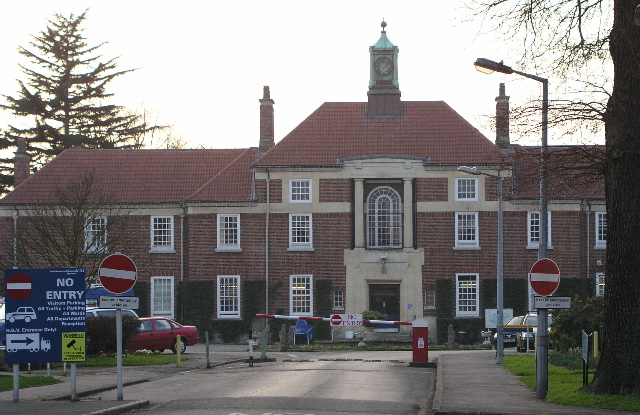

- Shown in Bromley

Geography
- Location: Monks Orchard Road, Beckenham, London, England

Organisation
- Care system: National Health Service
- Type: Specialist

Services
- Emergency department: No
- Beds: Approx 350
- Speciality: Psychiatric hospital

History
- Founded: 1247 as priory 1330 as hospital

Links
- Website: slam.nhs.uk/bethlem-royal-hospital
- Lists: Hospitals in England

Bethlem Royal Hospital, also known as St Mary Bethlehem, Bethlehem Hospital and Bedlam, is a psychiatric hospital in Bromley, London. Its famous history has inspired several horror books, films, and television series, most notably Bedlam, a 1946 film with Boris Karloff.

The hospital is part of the South London and Maudsley NHS Foundation Trust. It is closely associated with King's College London and, in partnership with the Institute of Psychiatry, Psychology and Neuroscience, is a major centre for psychiatric research. It is part of the King's Health Partners academic health science centre and the National Institute for Health and Care Research (NIHR) Biomedical Research Centre for Mental Health.

Founded in 1247, the hospital was originally located just outside the city walls, in the Bishopsgate Without area of the City of London. It moved a short distance to Moorfields in 1676, and then to St George's Fields in Southwark in 1815, before moving to its current location in Monks Orchard in 1930.

The word "bedlam", meaning uproar and confusion, is derived from the hospital's nickname. Although it became a modern psychiatric hospital, historically it was representative of the worst excesses of asylums in the era of lunacy reform.

== 1247–1633 ==
=== Foundation ===
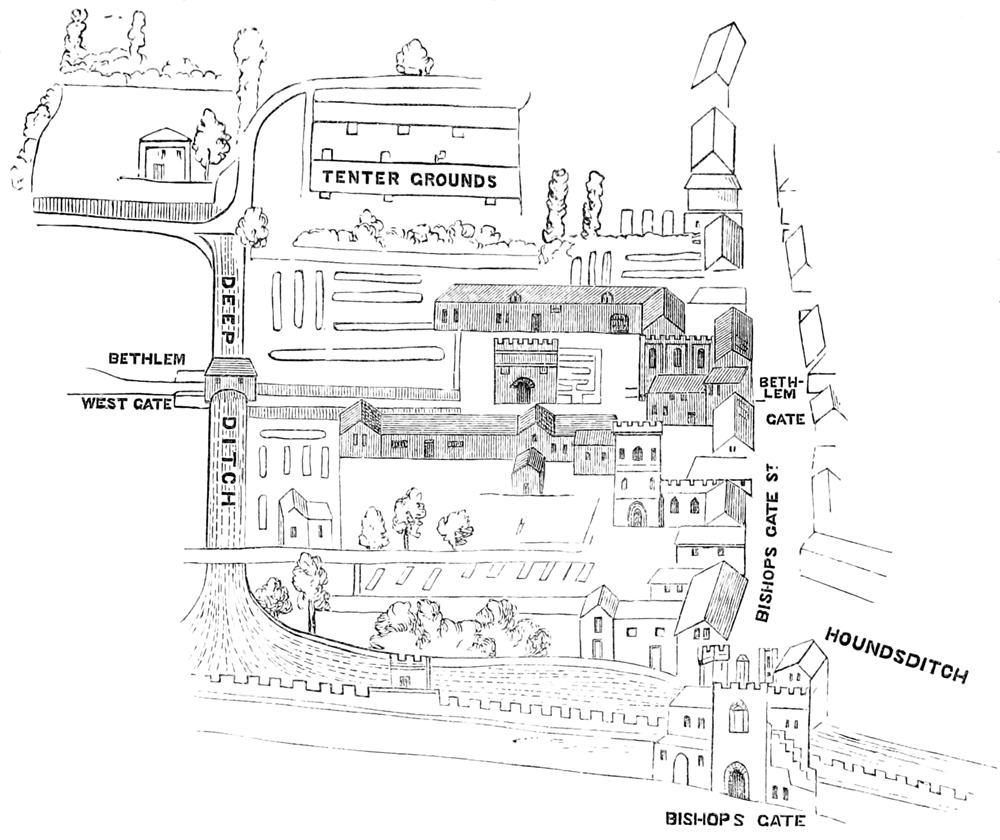
Plan of the first Bethlem

Map of London in c. 1300. St Mary Spital is shown north of the city wall, outside Bishopgate.

The hospital was founded in 1247 as the Priory of the New Order of our Lady of Bethlehem in the city of London during the reign of Henry III.

It was established by the Bishop-elect of Bethlehem, the Italian Goffredo de Prefetti, following a donation of personal property by the London alderman and former sheriff, Simon FitzMary. The original location was just beyond London's wall, in the parish of St Botolph-without-Bishopsgate, which for civil purposes was coterminous with the Bishopsgate Without area. The hospital was located where the south-east corner of Liverpool Street Station now stands. Bethlem was not initially intended as a hospital, in the clinical sense, much less as a specialist institution for the insane, but as a centre for the collection of alms to support the Crusader Church and to link England to the Holy Land.

De Prefetti's need to generate income for the Crusader Church and restore the financial fortunes of his see had been occasioned by two misfortunes: his bishopric had suffered significant losses following the destructive conquest of Bethlehem by the Khwarazmian Turks in 1244, and his immediate predecessor had further impoverished his cathedral chapter through the alienation of a considerable amount of its property. The priory, obedient to the Church of Bethlehem, also housed the poor and, if they visited, provided hospitality to the bishop, canons, and brothers of Bethlehem. Thus, Bethlem became a hospital, in medieval usage, "an institution supported by charity or taxes for the care of the needy". The subordination of the priory's religious order to the bishops of Bethlehem was further underlined in the foundational charter, which stipulated that the prior, canons, and inmates were to wear a star upon their cloaks and capes to symbolise their obedience to the church of Bethlehem.

=== Politics and patronage ===
During the thirteenth and fourteenth centuries, with its activities underwritten by episcopal and papal indulgences, the hospital's role as a centre for alms collection persisted, but its linkage to the Order of Bethlehem increasingly unravelled, putting its purpose and patronage in doubt. In 1346, the master of Bethlem, a position at that time granted to the most senior of London's Bethlemite brethren, applied to the city authorities seeking protection; thereafter metropolitan office-holders claimed power to oversee the appointment of masters and demanded in return an annual payment of 40 shillings. It is doubtful whether the city really provided substantial protection and much less that the mastership fell within their patronage but, dating from the 1346 petition, it played a role in the management of Bethlem's finances. By this time, the Bethlehemite bishops had relocated to Clamecy, France, under the surety of the Avignon papacy. This was significant as, throughout the reign of Edward III (1327–77), the English monarchy had extended its patronage over ecclesiastical positions through the seizure of priories under the control of non-English religious houses. As a dependent house of the Order of Saint Bethlehem in Clamecy, Bethlem was vulnerable to seizure by the crown and this occurred in the 1370s when Edward III took control. The purpose of this appropriation was, in the context of the Hundred Years' War between France and England, to prevent funds raised by the hospital from enriching the French monarchy via the papal court. After this event the masters of the hospital, semi-autonomous figures in charge of its day-to-day management, were normally crown appointees and it became an increasingly secularised institution. The memory of its foundation became muddied and muddled; in 1381, the royal candidate for the post of master claimed that from its beginnings it had been superintended by an order of knights and he confused its founder, Goffredo de Prefetti, with the Frankish crusader, Godfrey de Bouillon. The removal of the last symbolic link to the Bethlehemites was confirmed in 1403 when it was reported that master and inmates no longer wore the star of Bethlehem.

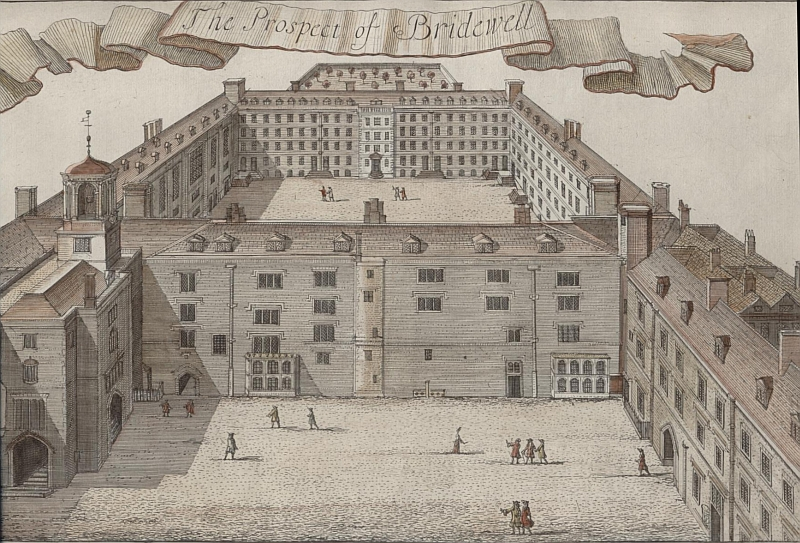
"The Prospect of Bridewell" from John Strype's, An Accurate Edition of Stow's "A Survey of London" (1720). From 1557, Bethlem was administered by the Bridewell Governors.

In 1546, the Lord Mayor of London, Sir John Gresham, petitioned the crown to grant Bethlem to the city. This petition was partially successful and Henry VIII reluctantly ceded to the City of London "the custody, order and governance" of the hospital and of its "occupants and revenues". This charter came into effect in 1547. The crown retained possession of the hospital while its administration fell to the city authorities. Following a brief interval when it was placed under the management of the governors of Christ's Hospital, from 1557 it was administered by the governors of Bridewell, a prototype house of correction at Blackfriars. Having been thus one of the few metropolitan hospitals to have survived the dissolution of the monasteries physically intact, this joint administration continued, not without interference by both the crown and city, until incorporation into the National Health Service in 1948.

=== From Bethlem to Bedlam ===
A Church of Our Lady that is named Bedlam. And in that place be found many men that be fallen out of their wit. And full honestly they be kept in that place; and some be restored onto their wit and health again. And some be abiding therein for ever, for they be fallen so much out of themselves that it is incurable unto man

— William Gregory, Lord Mayor of London, c. 1450

It is unknown when Bethlem, or Bedlam, began to specialise in the care and control of the insane, but it has been frequently asserted that Bethlem was first used for the insane from 1377. This date is derived from the unsubstantiated conjecture of the Reverend Edward Geoffrey O'Donoghue, chaplain to the hospital, who published a monograph on its history in 1914. While it is possible that Bethlem was receiving the insane during the late fourteenth century, the first definitive record of their presence in the hospital is in the details of a visitation of the Charity Commissioners in 1403. This recorded that amongst other patients there were six male inmates who were "mente capti", a Latin term indicating insanity. The report of the visitation also noted the presence of four pairs of manacles, 11 chains, six locks and two pairs of stocks but it is not clear if any or all of these items were for the restraint of the inmates. While mechanical restraint and solitary confinement are likely to have been used for those regarded as dangerous, little else is known of the actual treatment of the insane for much of the medieval period. The presence of a small number of insane patients in 1403 marks Bethlem's gradual transition from a diminutive general hospital into a specialist institution for the confinement of the insane. This process was largely completed by 1460.

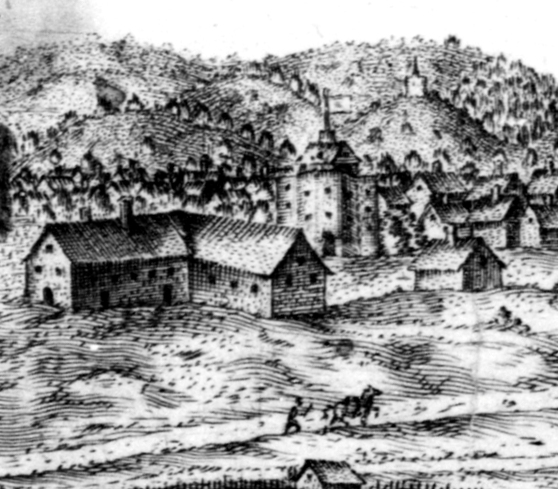
Curtain Theatre circa 1600 (cylindrical building in the background). Some authorities believe this to be a depiction of The Theatre, the other Elizabethan theatre at Shoreditch in west Moorfields. Both playhouses were a stone's throw away from the original Bethlem site at Bishopsgate.

From the fourteenth century, Bethlem had been referred to colloquially as "Bedleheem", "Bedleem" or "Bedlam". Initially "Bedlam" was an informal name but from approximately the Jacobean era the word entered everyday speech to signify a state of madness, chaos, and the irrational nature of the world. This development was partly due to Bedlam's staging in several plays of the Jacobean and Caroline periods, including The Honest Whore, Part I (1604); Northward Ho (1607); The Duchess of Malfi (1612); The Pilgrim (c. 1621); and The Changeling (1622). This dramatic interest in Bedlam is also evident in references to it in early seventeenth-century plays such as Epicœne, or The Silent Woman (1609), Bartholomew Fair (1614), and A New Way to Pay Old Debts (c. 1625). The appropriation of Bedlam as a theatrical locale for the depiction of madness probably owes no little debt to the establishment in 1576 in nearby Moorfields of The Curtain and The Theatre, two of the main London playhouses; it may also have been coincident with that other theatricalisation of madness as charitable object, the commencement of public visiting at Bethlem.

=== Management ===
The position of master was a sinecure largely regarded by its occupants as means of profiting at the expense of the poor in their charge. The appointment of the masters, later known as keepers, had lain within the patronage of the Crown until 1547. Thereafter the city, through the Court of Aldermen, took control and, as with the king's appointees, the office was used to reward loyal servants and friends. Compared to the masters placed by the monarch, those who gained the position through the city were of much more modest status. In 1561, the Lord Mayor succeeded in having his former porter, Richard Munnes, a draper by trade, appointed to the position. The sole qualification of his successor in 1565, a man by the name of Edward Rest, appears to have been his occupation as a grocer. Rest died in 1571, at which point the keepership passed on to John Mell in 1576, known for his abuse of "the governors, those who gave money to the poor, and the poor themselves." The Bridewell Governors largely interpreted the role of keeper as that of a house manager and this is clearly reflected in the occupations of most appointees as they tended to be inn-keepers, victualers, or brewers, and the like. When patients were sent to Bethlem by the Governors of the Bridewell the keeper was paid from hospital funds. For the remainder, keepers were paid either by the families and friends of inmates or by the parish authorities. It is possible that keepers negotiated their fees for these latter categories of patients.

John Mell's death in 1579 left the keepership open for the long-term keeper Roland Sleford, a London cloth-maker, who left his post in 1598, apparently of his own volition, after a 19-year tenure. Two months later, the Bridewell Governors, who had until then shown little interest in the management of Bethlem beyond the appointment of keepers, conducted an inspection of the hospital and a census of its inhabitants for the first time in over 40 years. Their purpose was "to view and p[er]use the defaultes and want of rep[ar]ac[i]ons". They found that during the period of Sleford's keepership the hospital buildings had fallen into a deplorable condition with the roof caving in and the kitchen sink blocked, and reported that "...it is not fitt for anye man to dwell in wch was left by the Keeper for that it is so loathsomly filthely kept not fit for any man to come into the house".

The committee of inspection found 21 inmates with only two having been admitted during the previous 12 months. Of the remainder, at least six had been resident for a minimum of eight years and one inmate had been there for around 25 years. Three were from outside London, six were charitable cases paid for out of the hospital's resources, one was supported by a parochial authority, and the rest were provided for by family, friends, benefactors or, in one instance, out of their own funds. The reason for the Governors' new-found interest in Bethlem is unknown but it may have been connected to the increased scrutiny the hospital was coming under with the passing of poor law legislation in 1598 and to the decision by the Governors to increase hospital revenues by opening it up to general visitors as a spectacle. After this inspection, the Governors initiated some repairs and visited the hospital at more frequent intervals. During one such visit in 1607, they ordered the purchase of clothing and eating vessels for the inmates, presumably indicating the lack of such basic items.

=== Helkiah Crooke ===
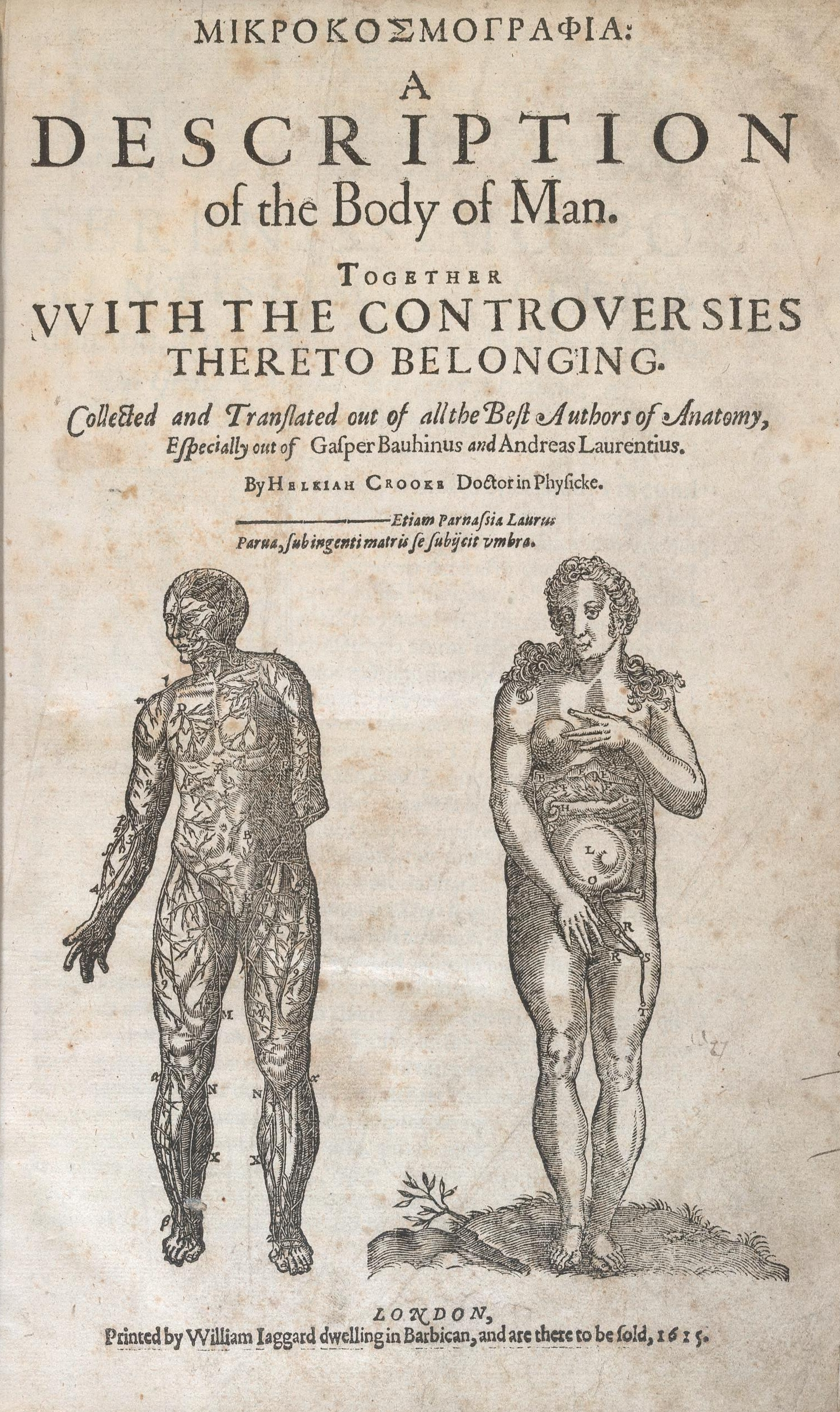
The title page of Helkiah Crooke's Microcosmographia (1615). Crooke was appointed keeper-physician to Bethlem Hospital in 1619.

At the bidding of James VI and I, Helkiah Crooke (1576–1648) was appointed keeper-physician in 1619. As a Cambridge graduate, the author of an enormously successful English language book of anatomy entitled Microcosmographia: a Description of the Body of Man (1615) and a member of the medical department of the royal household, (Note: Although accepted by many historians, including Roy Porter, as Jonathan Andrews points out, Crooke's claim that he was physician to the king, made in the first three editions of his popular medical textbook of human anatomy, Microcosmographia (1615, 1616 and 1618), was baseless.) he was clearly of higher social status than his city-appointed predecessors (his father was a noted preacher, and his elder brother Thomas was created a baronet). Crooke had successfully ousted the previous keeper, the layman Thomas Jenner, after a campaign in which he had castigated his rival for being "unskilful in the practice of medicine". While this may appear to provide evidence of the early recognition by the Governors that the inmates of Bethlem required medical care, the formal conditions of Crooke's appointment did not detail any required medical duties. Indeed, the Board of Governors continued to refer to the inmates as "the poore" or "prisoners" and their first designation as patients appears to have been by the Privy Council in 1630.

From 1619, Crooke unsuccessfully campaigned through petition to the king for Bethlem to become an independent institution from the Bridewell, a move that while likely meant to serve both monarchial and personal interest would bring him into conflict with the Bridewell Governors. Following a pattern of management laid down by early office-holders, his tenure as keeper was distinguished by his irregular attendance at the hospital and the avid appropriation of its funds as his own. Such were the depredations of his regime that an inspection by the Governors in 1631 reported that the patients were "likely to starve". Charges against his conduct were brought before the Governors in 1632. Crooke's royal favour having dissolved with the death of James I, Charles I instigated an investigation against him in the same year. This established his absenteeism and embezzlement of hospital resources and charged him with failing to pursue "any endeavour for the curing of the distracted persons". It also revealed that charitable goods and hospital-purchased foodstuffs intended for patients had been typically misappropriated by the hospital steward, either for his own use or to be sold to the inmates. If patients lacked resources to trade with the steward they often went hungry. These findings resulted in the dismissal in disgrace of Crooke, (Note: Crooke claimed that his keepership of Bethlem had cost him £1,000. Following his dismissal, the additional financial burden imposed by the royal inquiry's lengthy legal process led him to sell his College of Physicians fellowship, attained in 1620, back to that corporate body for £5. In 1642 he was still futilely campaigning for his reinstatement, and he died in relative obscurity in 1648. He was immortalised on stage in the character of the grasping asylum doctor, Alibius, in the Jacobean tragedy, The Changeling (1622).) the last of the old-style keepers, along with his steward on 24 May 1633. (Note: The first evidence for the existence of a steward in Bethlem is during Crooke's tenure as keeper-physician.)

=== Conditions ===
In 1632 it was recorded that the old house of Bethlem had "below stairs a parlour, a kitchen, two larders, a long entry throughout the house, and 21 rooms wherein the poor distracted people lie, and above the stairs eight rooms more for servants and the poor to lie in". It is likely that this arrangement was not significantly different in the sixteenth century. Although inmates, if deemed dangerous or disturbing, were chained or locked up, Bethlem was an otherwise open building with its inhabitants at liberty to roam around its confines and possibly the local neighbourhood. The neighbouring inhabitants would have been quite familiar with the condition of the hospital as in the 1560s, and probably for some considerable time before that, those who lacked a lavatory in their own homes had to walk through "the west end of the long house of Bethlem" to access the rear of the hospital and reach the "common Jacques". Typically the hospital appears to have been a receptacle for the very disturbed and troublesome and this fact lends some credence to accounts such as that provided by Donald Lupton in the 1630s who described the "cryings, screechings, roarings, brawlings, shaking of chaines, swearings, frettings, chaffings" that he observed.

Bethlem had been built over a sewer that served both the hospital and its precinct. This common drain regularly blocked, resulting in overflows of waste at the entrance of the hospital. The 1598 visitation by the Governors had observed that the hospital was "filthely kept", but the Governors rarely made any reference to the need for staff to clean the hospital. The level of hygiene reflected the inadequate water supply, which, until its replacement in 1657, consisted of a single wooden cistern in the back yard from which water had to be laboriously transported by bucket. In the same yard since at least the early seventeenth century there was a "washhouse" to clean patients' clothes and bedclothes and in 1669 a drying room for clothes was added. Patients, if capable, were permitted to use the "house of easement", (Note: A toilet.) of which there were two at most, but more frequently "piss-pots" were used in their cells. Unsurprisingly, inmates left to brood in their cells with their own excreta were, on occasion, liable to throw such "filth & Excrem[en]t" into the hospital yard or onto staff and visitors. Lack of facilities combined with patient incontinence and prevalent conceptions of the mad as animalistic and dirty, fit to be kept on a bed of straw, appear to have promoted an acceptance of hospital squalor. However, this was an age with very different standards of public and personal hygiene when people typically were quite willing to urinate or defecate in the street or even in their own fireplaces.

For much of the seventeenth century the dietary provision for patients appears to have been inadequate. This was especially so during Crooke's regime, when inspection found several patients suffering from starvation. Corrupt staff practices were evidently a significant factor in patient malnourishment and similar abuses were noted in the 1650s and 1670s. The Governors failed to manage the supply of victuals, relying on "gifts in kind" for basic provisions, and the resources available to the steward to purchase foodstuffs was dependent upon the goodwill of the keeper. Patients were fed twice a day on a "lowering diet" (an intentionally reduced and plain diet) consisting of bread, meat, oatmeal, butter, cheese, and generous amounts of beer. It is likely that daily meals alternated between meat and dairy products, almost entirely lacking in fruit or vegetables. That the portions appear to have been inadequate also likely reflected contemporary humoral theory that justified rationing the diet of the mad, the avoidance of rich foods, and a therapeutics of depletion and purgation to restore the body to balance and restrain the spirits.

== 1634–1791 ==
=== Medical regimen ===
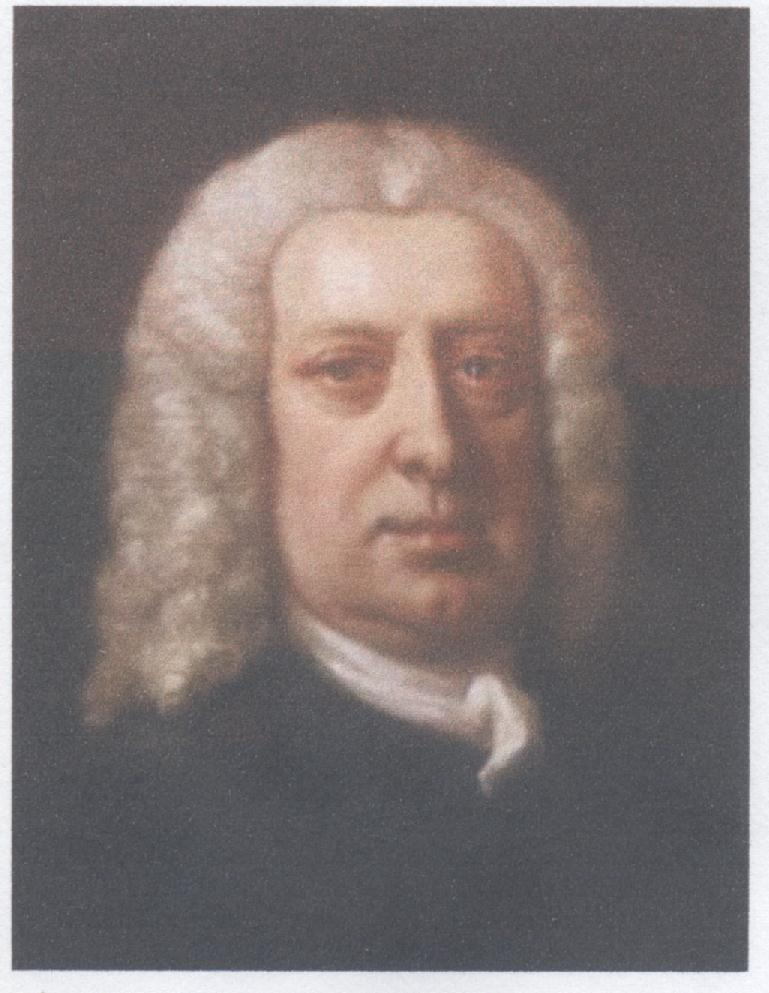
James Monro was elected to the post of Bethlem physician in 1728, a position which he retained until his death in 1752. This marked the beginning of a 125-year Monro family dynasty of Bethlem physicians.

The year 1634 is typically interpreted as denoting the divide between the medieval and early modern administration of Bethlem. It marked the end of the day-to-day management by an old-style keeper-physician and its replacement by a three-tiered medical regime composed of a non-resident physician, a visiting surgeon and an apothecary, a model adopted from the royal hospitals. The medical staff were elected by the Court of Governors and, in a bid to prevent profiteering at the expense of patients that had reached its apogee in Crooke's era, they were all eventually salaried with limited responsibility for the financial affairs of the hospital. Personal connections, interests and occasionally royal favour were pivotal factors in the appointment of physicians, but by the measure of the times appointees were well qualified as almost all were Oxford or Cambridge graduates and a significant number were candidates for or fellows of the Royal College of Physicians. Although the posts were strongly contested, nepotistic appointment practices played a significant role. The election of James Monro as physician in 1728 marked the beginning of a 125-year Monro family dynasty extending through four generations of fathers and sons. Family influence was also significant in the appointment of surgeons but absent in that of apothecaries.

The office of physician was largely an honorary and charitable one with only a nominal salary. As with most hospital posts, attendance was required only intermittently and the greater portion of the income was derived from private practice. Bethlem physicians, maximising their association with the hospital, typically earned their coin in the lucrative "trade in lunacy" with many acting as visiting physicians to, presiding over, or even, as with the Monros and their predecessor Thomas Allen, establishing their own mad-houses. Initially both surgeons and apothecaries were also without salary and their hospital income was solely dependent upon their presentation of bills for attendance to the Court of Governors. This system was frequently abused and the bills presented were often deemed exorbitant by the Board of Governors. The problem of financial exploitation was partly rectified in 1676, when surgeons received a salary, and from the mid-eighteenth century elected apothecaries were likewise salaried and normally resident within the hospital. Dating from this latter change, the vast majority of medical responsibilities within the institution were undertaken by the sole resident medical officer, the apothecary, owing to the relatively irregular attendance of the physician and surgeon.

But is there so great Merit and Dexterity in being a mad Doctor? The common Prescriptions of a Bethlemitical Doctor are a Purge and a Vomit, and a Vomit and a Purge over again, and sometimes a Bleeding, which is no great mystery

— Alexander Cruden, The London Citizen Exceedingly Injured, 1739.

The medical regime, being married to a depletive or antiphlogistic physic until the early nineteenth century, (Note: Medical knowledge, particularly in the field of anatomical pathology, made significant advances throughout the eighteenth century but medical treatment remained largely moribund. Despite a declining intellectual foundation, the humoral-based medical practices of depletion and purgation, later called antiphlogistic (anti-inflammatory) therapy, had undergone little change since the time of Galen in the second century AD. Under this tradition, challenged increasingly from the seventeenth century, physical and mental health was dependent upon the maintenance of a proper balance between the four bodily humours of blood, phlegm, black bile and yellow bile (choler). The humours were replenished through the ingestion of food and discharged naturally when they became noxious. Disease could arise when there was an overabundance or plethora in a given humour and this necessitated its removal from the body through venesection, purging, or a reduction in dietary intake.) had a reputation for conservatism that was neither unearned nor, given the questionable benefit of some therapeutic innovations, (Note: For instance Thomas Allen, Bethlem physician from 1667 until his death in 1684, happily dismissed the expressed wish of his colleagues in the Royal Society that he should try the then experimental treatment for insanity of animal-to-human blood transfusion "upon some mad person in ... Bethlem".) necessarily ill-conceived in every instance. Bathing was introduced in the 1680s at a time when hydrotherapy was enjoying a recrudescence in popularity. "Cold bathing", opined John Monro, Bethlem physician for 40 years from 1751, "has in general an excellent effect"; and remained much in vogue as a treatment throughout the eighteenth century. By the early nineteenth century, bathing was routine for all patients of sufficient hardiness from summer "to the setting-in of the cold weather". Spring signalled recourse to the traditional armamentarium; from then until the end of summer Bethlem's "Mad Physick" reigned supreme as all patients, barring those deemed incurable, could expect to be bled and blistered and then dosed with emetics and purgatives. Indiscriminately applied, these curative measures were administered with the most cursory physical examination, if any, and with sufficient excess to risk not only health but also life. Such was the violence of the standard medical course, "involving voiding of the bowels, vomiting, scarification, sores and bruises," that patients were regularly discharged or refused admission if they were deemed unfit to survive the physical onslaught.

The reigning medical ethos was the subject of public debate in the mid-eighteenth century when the Paper War of 1752–1753 erupted between John Monro and his rival William Battie, physician to the reformist St Luke's Asylum of London, founded in 1751. The Bethlem Governors, who had presided over the only public asylum in Britain until the early eighteenth century, looked upon St Luke's as an upstart institution and Battie, formerly a Governor at Bethlem, as traitorous. In 1758 Battie published his Treatise on Madness which castigated Bethlem as archaic and outmoded, uncaring of its patients and founded upon a despairing medical system whose therapeutic transactions were both injudicious and unnecessarily violent. In contrast, Battie presented St Luke's as a progressive and innovative hospital, oriented towards the possibility of cure and scientific in approach. Monro responded promptly, publishing Remarks on Dr. Battie's Treatise on Madness in the same year.

=== Bethlem rebuilt at Moorfields ===
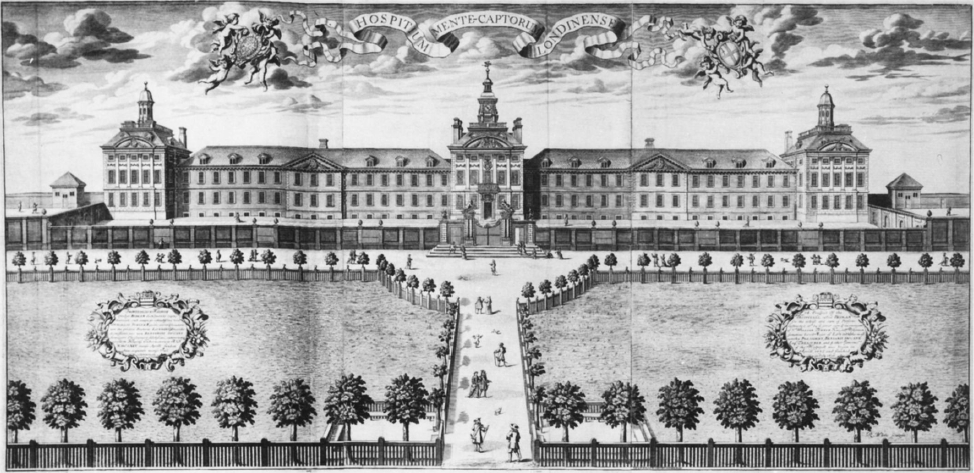
The new Bethlem Hospital, designed by Robert Hooke, 1676, "primarily as a piece of fundraising rhetoric"

Most of Bethlehem Hospital by William Henry Toms for William Maitland's History of London, published 1739

Although Bethlem had been enlarged by 1667 to accommodate 59 patients, the Court of Governors of Bethlem and Bridewell observed at the start of 1674 that "the Hospitall House of Bethlem is very olde, weake & ruinous and to[o] small and streight for keepeing the greater numb[e]r of lunaticks therein att p[re]sent". With the increasing demand for admission and the inadequate and dilapidated state of the building it was decided to rebuild the hospital in Moorfields, just north of the city proper and one of the largest open spaces in London. The architect chosen for the new hospital, which was built rapidly and at great expense between 1675 and 1676, (Note: The total cost of the new Bethlem built at Moorfields came to £17,000. This expense served to underline the philanthropic magnificence of the presiding governors and rendered Bethlem's patients, in Edward Hatton's words: "great Objects of Charity; for this new Structure cost erecting about [£]17000 whereby not only the Stock of the Hospital is expended, but the Governours are out of Pockets several Sums which they were obliged to take up for that purpose ...") was the natural philosopher and City Surveyor Robert Hooke. He constructed an edifice that was monumental in scale at over 500 feet (150 m) wide and some 40 feet (12 m) deep. (Note: Estimates of the scale of the building run from 528 to 540 feet (161 to 165 m) wide and 30 to 40 feet (9.1 to 12.2 m) deep.) The surrounding walls were some 680 feet (210 m) long and 70 feet (21 m) deep while the south face at the rear was effectively screened by a 714-foot (218 m) stretch of London's ancient wall projecting westward from nearby Moorgate. At the rear and containing the courtyards where patients exercised and took the air, the walls rose to 14 feet (4.3 m) high. The front walls were only 8 feet (2.4 m) high but this was deemed sufficient as it was determined that "Lunatikes... are not to [be] permitted to walk in the yard to be situate[d] betweene the said intended new Building and the Wall aforesaid." It was also hoped that by keeping these walls relatively low the splendour of the new building would not be overly obscured. This concern to maximise the building's visibility led to the addition of six gated openings 10 feet (3.0 m) wide which punctuated the front wall at regular intervals, enabling views of the facade. Functioning as both advertisement and warning of what lay within, the stone pillars enclosing the entrance gates were capped by the figures of "Melancholy" and "Raving Madness" carved in Portland stone by the Danish-born sculptor Caius Gabriel Cibber.

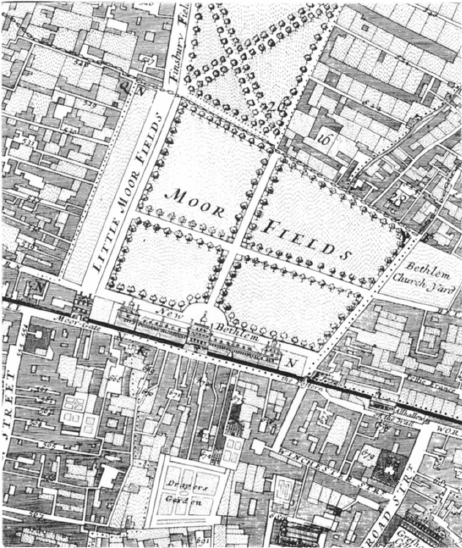
Late seventeenth-century map showing the placement of the new Bethlem Hospital in Moorfields. It shows the large gardens of Moorfields to the north of the front face of the building. The hospital is shown as a very long and thin structure.

At the instigation of the Bridewell Governors and to make a grander architectural statement of "charitable munificence", the hospital was designed as a single- rather than double-pile building, (Note: A double-pile building has two rooms arranged longitudinally along a central corridor. A single-pile has only one.) accommodating initially 120 patients. Having cells and chambers on only one side of the building facilitated the dimensions of the great galleries, essentially long and capacious corridors, 13 feet (4.0 m) high and 16 feet (4.9 m) wide, which ran the length of both floors to a total span of 1,179 feet (359 m). Such was their scale that Roger L'Estrange remarked in a 1676 text eulogising the new Bethlem that their "Vast Length ... wearies the travelling eyes' of Strangers". The galleries were constructed more for public display than for the care of patients as, at least initially, inmates were prohibited from them lest "such persons that come to see the said Lunatickes may goe in Danger of their Lives". (Note: The Governors debated whether to install iron grates at the entrance to the galleries, which would have allowed patients the freedom to walk in them while preventing intercourse between male and female patients. This proposal was resisted, however, by those who thought it would have spoiled the view offered by the galleries. However, iron grates with a door to allow visitors to pass through them were installed in 1689 and presumably it is from this date patients who were not otherwise violent were permitted to walk the galleries. Patients, if deemed well enough, could use the rear yards for exercise both before and after this date. This allowed them to "take the aire in order to [aid] their Recovery".)

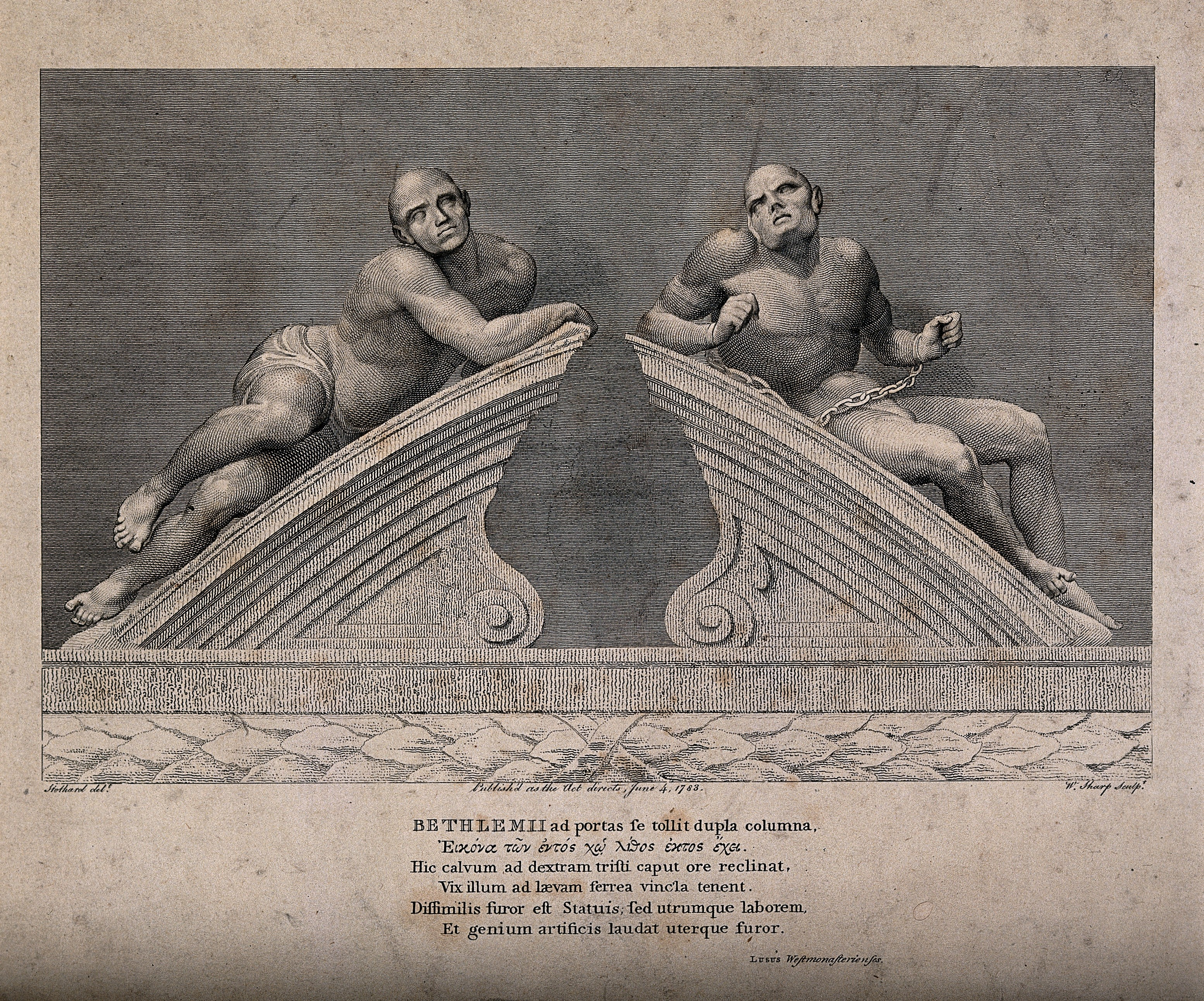
Melancholia and Raving Madness (mania) carved by Caius Gabriel Cibber (1680), and which adorned the entrance portal of the new Bethlem Hospital at Moorfields

The architectural design of the new Bethlem was primarily intended to project an image of the hospital and its governors consonant with contemporary notions of charity and benevolence. In an era prior to the state funding of hospitals and with patient fees covering only a portion of costs, such self-advertisement was necessary to win the donations, subscriptions and patronage essential for the institution's survival. This was particularly the case in raising funds to pay for major projects of expansion such as the rebuilding project at Moorfields or the addition of the Incurables Division in 1725–39 with accommodation for more than 100 patients. These highly visible acts of civic commitment could also serve to advance the claims to social status or political advantage of its Governors and supporters. However, while consideration of patients' needs may have been distinctly secondary, they were not absent. For instance, both the placement of the hospital in the open space of Moorfields and the form of the building with its large cells and well-lit galleries had been chosen to provide "health and Aire" in accordance with the miasmatic theory of disease causation. (Note: In 1676 there were 34 cells on one side of each of the four galleries, or 136 cells in all. The cells, large and well ventilated for the time by any measure, were 12 feet (3.7 m) deep by 8 feet 10 inches (2.69 m) wide and 12 feet 10 inches (3.91 m) high.)

It was London's first major charitable building since the Savoy Hospital (1505–17) and one of only a handful of public buildings then constructed in the aftermath of the Great Fire of London (1666). It would be regarded, during this period at least, as one of the "Prime Ornaments of the City ... and a noble Monument to Charity". Not least due to the increase in visitor numbers that the new building allowed, the hospital's fame and latterly infamy grew and this magnificently expanded Bethlem shaped English and international depictions of madness and its treatment.

=== Public visiting ===
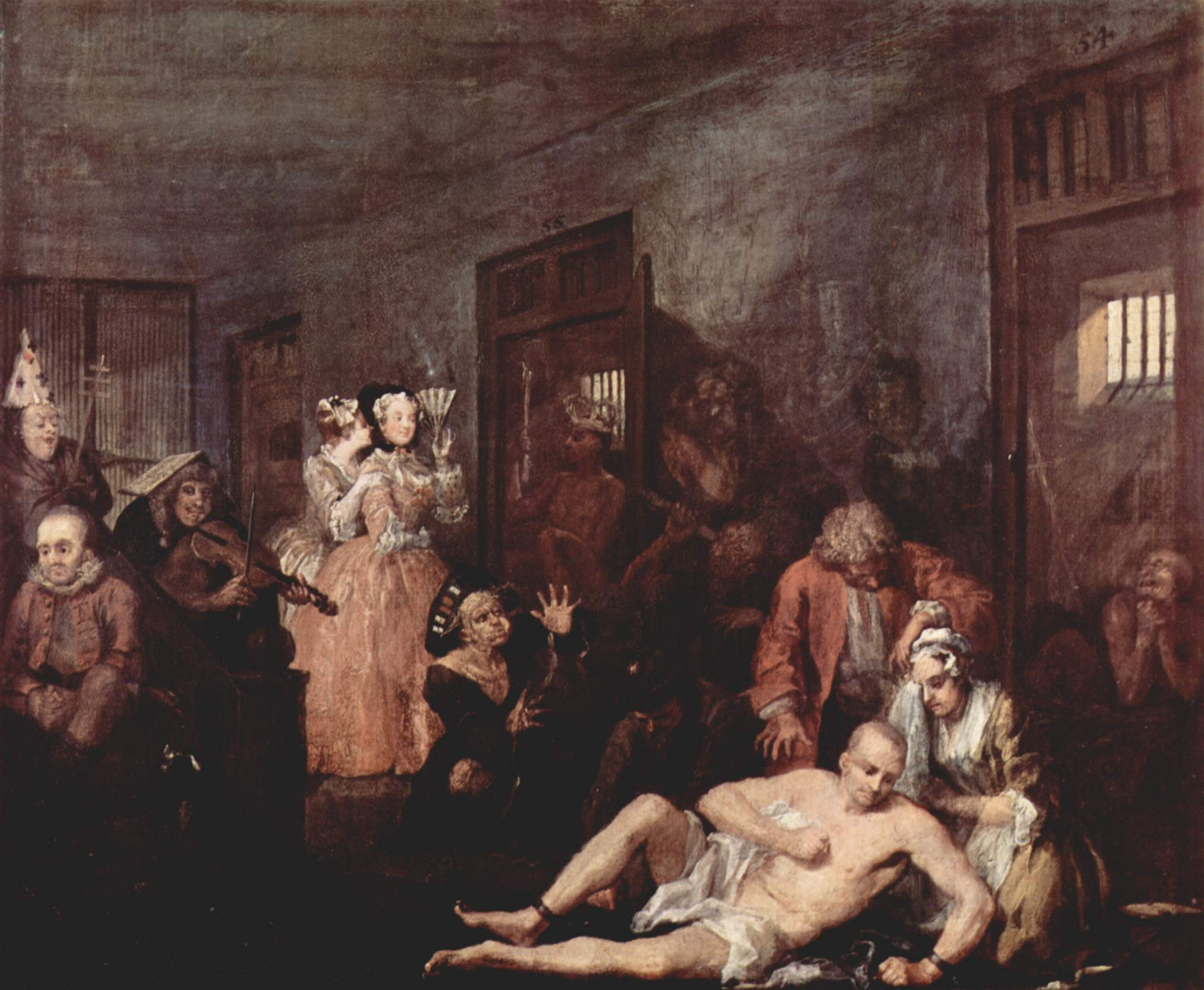
Eighteenth-century Bethlem was most notably portrayed in a scene from William Hogarth's A Rake's Progress (1735), the story of a rich merchant's son, Tom Rakewell, whose immoral living causes him to end up in Bethlem. (Note: The image shows a shaven-head and near-naked Rakewell in one of galleries of Bethlem, reclining in a position reminiscent of one of Cibber's figures. An attendant (barely visible in this painted version) is in the process of manacling his leg. The figure standing over Rakewell wearing a wig and with his head bowed forward is likely a physician and may have just bled the patient. Scull and Andrews opine that this figure "bears more than a passing resemblance to" James Monro, the father of John Monro.)

Visits by friends and relatives were allowed and it was expected that the family and friends of poor inmates would bring food and other essentials for their survival. Bethlem was and is best known for the fact that it also allowed public and casual visitors with no connection to the inmates. This display of madness as public show has often been considered the most scandalous feature of the historical Bedlam.

On the basis of circumstantial evidence, it is speculated that the Bridewell Governors may have decided as early as 1598 to allow public visitors as means of raising hospital income. (Note: This position, argued by Andrews et al., principally relies on a reading of the last line of the report of the 1598 visitation, quoted above, which refers to the fact that Bethlem was then "so loathsomely and filthely, kept not fitt for any man to come into". While conceding that "come into" here may refer to admissions they thought this unlikely given that the Bridewell Governors in the same line had already disparaged the hospital's patient accommodation. Instead, they argue, a more plausible interpretation is that it evinces the concern of the Governors that the hospital conditions might dissuade public visitors which they were anxious to increase as a means of augmenting Bethlem's revenues.) The only other reference to visiting in the sixteenth century is provided in a comment in Thomas More's 1522 treatise The Four Last Things, where he observed that "thou shalt in Bedleem see one laugh at the knocking of his head against a post". As More occupied a variety of official positions that might have occasioned his calling to the hospital and as he lived nearby, his visit provides no compelling evidence that public visitation was widespread during the sixteenth century. The first apparently definitive documentation of public visiting derives from a 1610 record which details Lord Percy's payment of 10 shillings for the privilege of rambling through the hospital to view its deranged denizens. (Note: While in London, the young Percy and his troupe also "saw the lions, the shew of Bethlem, the places where the prince was created and the fireworks at the Artillery Garden". Carol Neely, however, thinks it improbable that an eight-year-old Lord Percy and his equally young cousins, while his father, Henry Percy, was then ensconced in the Tower of London, would have visited Bethlem at this date, particularly in consideration of the ramshackle condition of the hospital in the early seventeenth century. This is to ignore, however, the fact that there are many references to children visiting Bethlem.) It was also at this time, and perhaps not coincidentally, that Bedlam was first used as a stage setting with the publication of The Honest Whore, Part I, in 1604.

Evidence that the number of visitors rose following the move to Moorfields is provided in the observation by the Bridewell Governors in 1681 of "the greate quantity of persons that come daily to see the said Lunatickes". Eight years later the English merchant and author, Thomas Tryon, remarked disapprovingly of the "Swarms of People" that descended upon Bethlem during public holidays. In the mid-eighteenth-century a journalist of a topical periodical noted that at one time during Easter Week "one hundred people at least" were to be found visiting Bethlem's inmates. Evidently Bethlem was a popular attraction, yet there is no credible basis to calculate the annual number of visitors. The claim, still sometimes made, that Bethlem received 96,000 visitors annually is speculative in the extreme. (Note: It is still frequently and erroneously asserted that either during the eighteenth-century or as late as 1814 or 1815, the period depending on the source, there were 96,000 visits in a given year. For example, Michel Foucault in his History of Madness (2006) claimed "As late as 1815, if a report presented to the House of Commons is to be believed, Bethlem Hospital showed its lunatics every Sunday for one penny. The annual revenue from those visits amounted to almost 400 pounds which means that an astonishing 96,000 visitors came to see the mad each year." As Andrews et al. have noted, none of the claims in the above paragraph have any basis in fact. The notional figure of 96,000 visitors, which was first applied to the eighteenth century, derives from the original archival research of O'Donoghue and his 1914 history of the hospital. From this source Robert R. Reed arrived at the above dubious calculation of visitations per annum by dividing the contents of the Bethlem poors' box for a single year by the supposed entrance fee per person. However, there is no credible evidence to suggest that there was an official entrance charge of one penny, there is no way of knowing how much individual visitors donated and the figure of £400 includes the entirety of the contents of the poors' box and hence all the charitable donations that Bethlem received. It is likely that Foucault's source is Reed, and he transposes it to the nineteenth century. The report of the parliamentary inquiry of 1815–16 does not support any of his claims. The impossibility of his account is underlined by the fact that Sunday visits were banned in 1657 and public visitations were curtailed from 1770.) Nevertheless, it has been established that the pattern of visiting was highly seasonal and concentrated around holiday periods. As Sunday visiting was severely curtailed in 1650 and banned seven years later, the peak periods became Christmas, Easter, and Whitsun.

... you find yourself in a long and wide gallery, on either side of which are a large number of little cells where lunatics of every description are shut up, and you can get a sight of these poor creatures, little windows being let into the doors. Many inoffensive madmen walk in the big gallery. On the second floor is a corridor and cells like those on the first floor, and this is the part reserved for dangerous maniacs, most of them being chained and terrible to behold. On holidays numerous persons of both sexes, but belonging generally to the lower classes, visit this hospital and amuse themselves watching these unfortunate wretches, who often give them cause for laughter. On leaving this melancholy abode, you are expected by the porter to give him a penny but if you happen to have no change and give him a silver coin, he will keep the whole sum and return you nothing

— Inveterate letter-writer César de Saussure's account of Bethlem during his 1725 tour of London's sights.

The Governors actively sought out "people of note and quallitie" – the educated, wealthy and well-bred – as visitors. The limited evidence would suggest that the Governors enjoyed some success in attracting such visitors of "quality". In this elite and idealised model of charity and moral benevolence the necessity of spectacle, the showing of the mad so as to excite compassion, was a central component in the elicitation of donations, benefactions, and legacies. Nor was the practice of showing the poor and unfortunate to potential donators exclusive to Bethlem as similar spectacles of misfortune were performed for public visitors to the Foundling Hospital and Magdalen Hospital for Penitent Prostitutes. The donations expected of visitors to Bethlem – there never was an official fee (Note: However, during the seventeenth- and eighteenth-centuries staff at the asylum did try to exact such a fee and by 1742 it was customary for the porter to demand a minimum of one penny from visiting strangers.) – probably grew out of the monastic custom of almsgiving to the poor. While a substantial proportion of such monies undoubtedly found their way into the hands of staff rather than the hospital poors' box, (Note: The servants of Bethlem were allowed their own poors' box from 1662. The diversion of other monies into the pockets of the hospital staff undoubtedly helped to keep wages down.) Bethlem profited considerably from such charity, collecting on average between £300 and £350 annually from the 1720s until the curtailment of visiting in 1770. Thereafter the poors' box monies declined to about £20 or £30 per year.

Aside from its fund-raising function, the spectacle of Bethlem offered moral instruction for visiting strangers. For the "educated" observer Bedlam's theatre of the disturbed might operate as a cautionary tale providing a deterrent example of the dangers of immorality and vice. The mad on display functioned as a moral exemplum of what might happen if the passions and appetites were allowed to dethrone reason. As one mid-eighteenth-century correspondent commented: "[there is no] better lesson [to] be taught us in any part of the globe than in this school of misery. Here we may see the mighty reasoners of the earth, below even the insects that crawl upon it; and from so humbling a sight we may learn to moderate our pride, and to keep those passions within bounds, which if too much indulged, would drive reason from her seat, and level us with the wretches of this unhappy mansion".

Whether "persons of quality" or not, the primary allure for visiting strangers was neither moral edification nor the duty of charity but its entertainment value. In Roy Porter's memorable phrase, what drew them "was the frisson of the freakshow", where Bethlem was "a rare Diversion" to cheer and amuse. It became one of a series of destinations on the London tourist trail which included such sights as the Tower, the Zoo, Bartholomew Fair, London Bridge and Whitehall. Curiosity about Bethlem's attractions, its "remarkable characters", including figures such as Nathaniel Lee, the dramatist, and Oliver Cromwell's porter, Daniel, (Note: Daniel was purportedly 7 feet 6 inches (2.29 m) tall and the model for Cibber's figure of "Raving madness".) was, at least until the end of the eighteenth-century, quite a respectable motive for visiting.

From 1770 free public access ended with the introduction of a system whereby visitors required a ticket signed by a Governor. Visiting subjected Bethlem's patients to many abuses, including being poked with sticks by visitors or otherwise taunted, given drinks, and physically assaulted or sexually harassed, but its curtailment removed an important element of public oversight. In the period thereafter, with staff practices less open to public scrutiny, the worst patient abuses occurred.

== 1791–1900 ==
Despite its palatial pretensions, by the end of the eighteenth century Bethlem was physically deteriorating with uneven floors, buckling walls, and a leaking roof. It resembled "a crazy carcass with no wall still vertical – a veritable Hogarthian auto-satire". The financial cost of maintaining the Moorfields building was onerous and the capacity of the Governors to meet these demands was stymied by shortfalls in Bethlem's income in the 1780s occasioned by the bankruptcy of its treasurer; further monetary strains were imposed in the following decade by inflationary wage and provision costs in the context of the Revolutionary wars with France. In 1791, Bethlem's Surveyor, Henry Holland, presented a report to the Governors detailing an extensive list of the building's deficiencies including structural defects and uncleanliness and estimated that repairs would take five years to complete at a cost of £8,660: only a fraction of this sum was allocated and by the end of the decade it was clear that the problem had been largely unaddressed. Holland's successor to the post of Surveyor, James Lewis, was charged in 1799 with compiling a new report on the building's condition. Presenting his findings to the Governors the following year, Lewis declared the building "incurable" and opined that further investment in anything other than essential repairs would be financially imprudent. He was, however, careful to insulate the Governors from any criticism concerning Bethlem's physical dilapidation as, rather than decrying either Hooke's design or the structural impact of additions, he castigated the slipshod nature of its rapid construction. Lewis observed that it had been partly built on land called "the Town Ditch", a receptacle for rubbish, and this provided little support for a building whose span extended to over 500 feet (150 m). He also noted that the brickwork was not on any foundation but laid "on the surface of the soil, a few inches below the present floor", while the walls, overburdened by the weight of the roofs, were "neither sound, upright nor level".

=== Bethlem rebuilt at St George's Fields ===
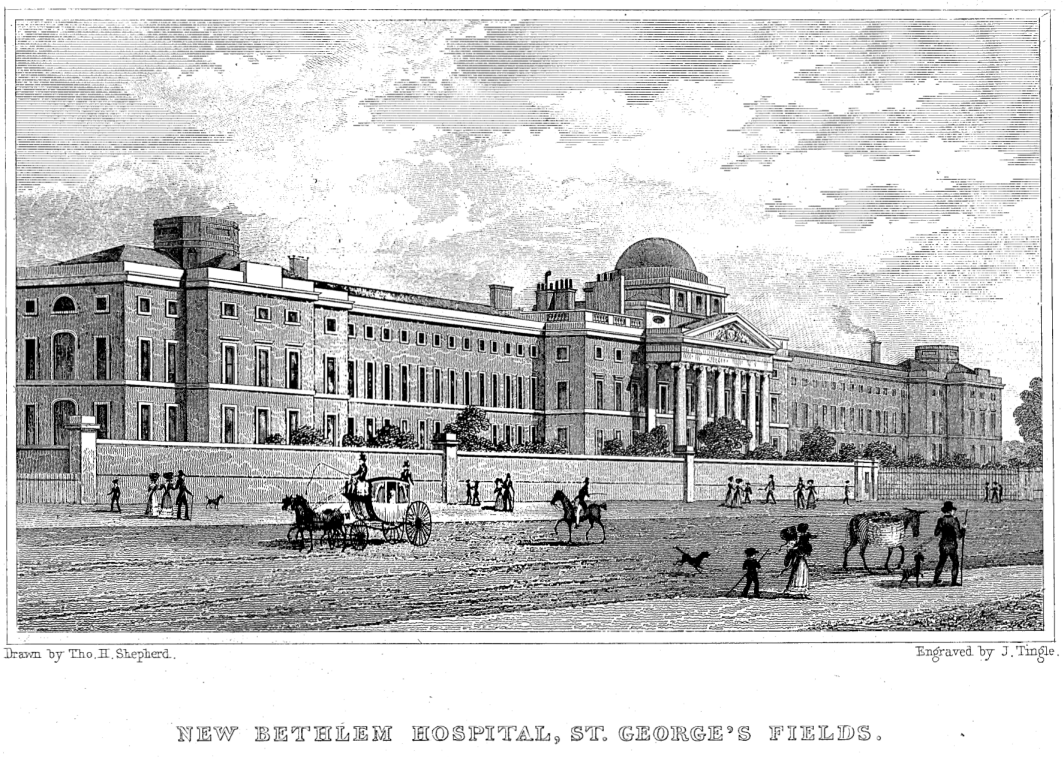
Bethlem Hospital at St George's Fields, 1828

Bethlem Hospital Act 1810
- Act of Parliament
- Parliament of the United Kingdom
- Long title: An Act for vesting the Lease of the Governors of Bethlem Hospital in the Scite of the Hospital, in the Mayor and Commonalty and Citizens of the City of London by whom it was granted; and for authorizing the said Mayor and Commonalty and Citizens to grant certain Lands in Saint George's Fields, in lieu thereof, to Trustees for the Governors of the said Hospital for the like Term, for the Purpose of erecting a new Hospital thereon on an enlarged Scale.
- Citation: 50 Geo. 3. c. cxcviii
- Territorial extent: United Kingdom

Dates
- Royal assent: 15 June 1810
- Commencement: 15 June 1810 (Note: The Acts of Parliament (Commencement) Act 1793.)
- Repealed: 31 January 2013
Other legislation
Repealed by	Statute Law (Repeals) Act 2013

Status: Repealed

Text of statute as originally enacted

Bethlem Hospital Act 1839
- Act of Parliament
- Parliament of the United Kingdom
- Long title: An Act to enable the Mayor and Commonalty and Citizens of the City of London to let and sell Parcels of Ground in Saint George's Fields near Bethlem Hospital to the Governors of the said Hospital.
- Citation: 2 & 3 Vict. c. 20 Pr.
- Territorial extent: United Kingdom

Dates
- Royal assent: 1 July 1839
- Commencement: 1 July 1839
- Repealed: 31 January 2013
Other legislation
Repealed by	Statute Law (Repeals) Act 2013

Status: Repealed

Text of statute as originally enacted

While the logic of Lewis's report was clear, the Court of Governors, facing continuing financial difficulties, only resolved in 1803 behind the project of rebuilding on a new site, and a fund-raising drive was initiated in 1804. In the interim, attempts were made to rehouse patients at local hospitals, and admissions to Bethlem, sections of which were deemed uninhabitable, were significantly curtailed such that the patient population fell from 266 in 1800 to 119 in 1814. Financial obstacles to the proposed move remained significant. A national press campaign to solicit donations from the public was launched in 1805. Parliament was successfully lobbied to provide £10,000 for the fund under an agreement whereby the Bethlem Governors would provide permanent accommodation for any lunatic soldiers or sailors of the French Wars. Early interest in relocating the hospital to a site at Gossey Fields had to be abandoned due to financial constraints and stipulations in the lease for Moorfields that precluded its resale. Instead, the governors engaged in protracted negotiations with the city to swap the Moorfields site for another municipally owned location at St George's Fields in Southwark, south of the Thames. The swap was concluded in 1810 and provided the Governors with a 12 acres (4.9 ha; 0.019 sq mi) site in a swamp-like, impoverished, highly populated, and industrialised area where the Dog and Duck tavern and St George's Spa had been.

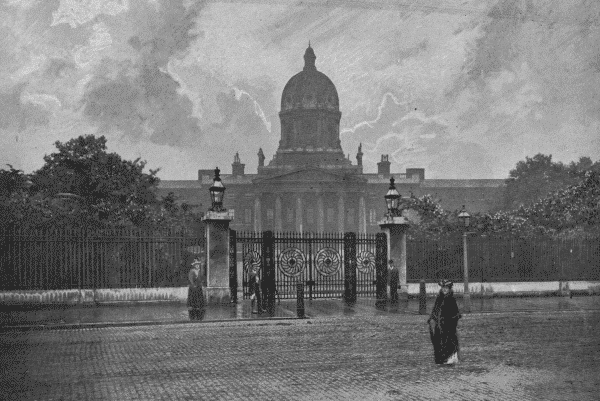
A view of Bethlem Hospital, published in 1896

A competition was held to design the new hospital at Southwark in which the noted Bethlem patient James Tilly Matthews was an unsuccessful entrant. The governors elected to give James Lewis the task. Incorporating the best elements from the three winning competition designs, he produced a building in the neoclassical style that, while drawing heavily on Hooke's original plan, eschewed the ornament of its predecessor. Completed after three years in 1815, it was constructed during the first wave of county asylum building in England under the County Asylums Act 1808 (48 Geo. 3. c. 96). Extending to 580 feet (180 m) in length, the new hospital, which ran alongside the Lambeth Road, consisted of a central block with two wings of three storeys on either side. Female patients occupied the west wing and males the east; as at Moorfields, the cells were located off galleries that traversed each wing. Each gallery contained only one toilet, a sink and cold baths. Incontinent patients were kept on beds of straw in cells in the basement gallery; this space also contained rooms with fireplaces for attendants. A wing for the criminally insane – a legal category newly minted in the wake of the trial of a delusional James Hadfield for attempted regicide – was completed in 1816. This addition, which housed 45 men and 15 women, was wholly financed by the state.

The first 122 patients arrived in August 1815 having been transported to their new residence by a convoy of Hackney coaches. Problems with the building were soon noted as the steam heating did not function properly, the basement galleries were damp and the windows of the upper storeys were unglazed "so that the sleeping cells were either exposed to the full blast of cold air or were completely darkened". Although glass was placed in the windows in 1816, the Governors initially supported their decision to leave them unglazed on the basis that it provided ventilation and so prevented the build-up of "the disagreable effluvias peculiar to all madhouses". Faced with increased admissions and overcrowding, new buildings, designed by the architect Sydney Smirke, were added from the 1830s. The wing for criminal lunatics was increased to accommodate a further 30 men while additions to the east and west wings, extending the building's façade, provided space for an additional 166 inmates and a dome was added to the hospital chapel. At the end of this period of expansion Bethlem had a capacity for 364 patients.

=== 1815–16 parliamentary inquiry ===
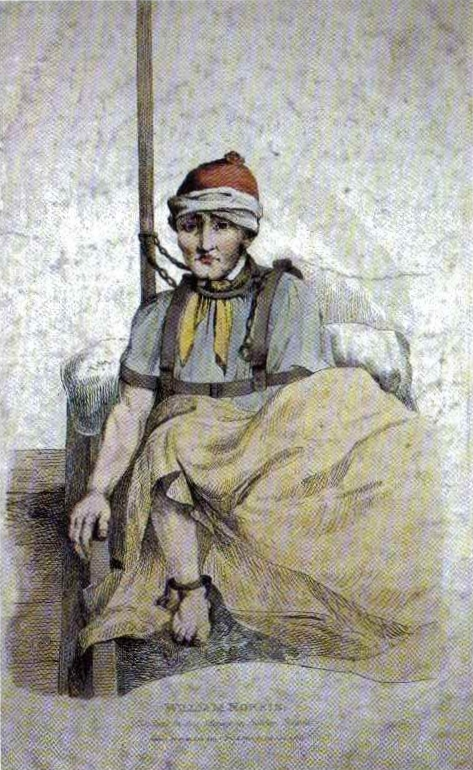
James (William) Norris, Bethlem patient, 1815

The late eighteenth and early nineteenth centuries are typically seen as decisive in the emergence of new attitudes towards the management and treatment of the insane. Increasingly, the emphasis shifted from the external control of the mad through physical restraint and coercion to their moral management whereby self-discipline would be inculcated through a system of reward and punishment. For proponents of lunacy reform, the Quaker-run York Retreat, founded in 1796, functioned as an exemplar of this new approach that would seek to re-socialise and re-educate the mad. Bethlem, embroiled in scandal from 1814 over its inmate conditions, would come to symbolise its antithesis.

Through newspaper reports initially and then evidence given to the 1815 Parliamentary Committee on Madhouses, the state of inmate care in Bethlem was chiefly publicised by Edward Wakefield, a Quaker land agent and leading advocate of lunacy reform. (Note: In 1812, Wakefield had determined to establish a new London asylum to be modelled on the Retreat and formed a committee to this end. As part of the planning process for this scheme, the committee first resolved to survey the metropolitan institutions for the care of the insane: St Luke's, Guy's Hospital and Bethlem.) He visited Bethlem several times during the late spring and early summer of 1814. (Note: The initial attempts by Wakefield to gain access to Bethlem were rebuffed by the hospital authorities who were particularly keen to protect Bethlem's image at a time when they were applying to parliament for funds to finance the move to Southwark. Wakefield, mindful of the difficulties reformers had had in accessing other institutions, persisted and, having secured an invitation to visit from one of Bethlem's Governors, began the first of his many visits to the hospital on 25 April 1814. This visit was cut short by the hospital steward, but Wakefield returned on 2 May accompanied by Charles Western, a Member of Parliament. Wakefield returned for a final unauthorized visit on 7 June 1814.) His inspections were of the old hospital at the Moorfields site, which was then in a state of disrepair; much of it was uninhabitable and the patient population had been significantly reduced. Contrary to the tenets of moral treatment, Wakefield found that the patients in the galleries were not classified in any logical manner as both highly disturbed and quiescent patients were mixed together indiscriminately. Later, when reporting on the chained and naked state of many patients, Wakefield sought to describe their conditions in such a way as to maximise the horror of the scene while decrying the apparently bestial treatment of inmates (Note: One of the side rooms contained about ten [female] patients, each chained by one arm to the wall; the chain allowing them merely to stand up by the bench or form fixed to the wall, or sit down on it. The nakedness of each patient was covered by a blanket only ... Many other unfortunate women were locked up in their cells, naked and chained on straw ... In the men's wing, in the side room, six patients were chained close to the wall by the right arm as well as by the right leg ... Their nakedness and their mode of confinement gave the room the complete appearance of a dog kennel. — Edward Wakefield, 1814) and the thuggish nature of the asylum keepers. (Note: Whilst [we were] looking at some of the bed-lying patients, a man arose naked from his bed, and had deliberately and quietly walked a few paces from his cell door along the gallery; he was instantly seized by the keepers, thrown in his bed, and leg-locked, without enquiry or observation: chains were universally substituted for the straitwaistcoat — Edward Wakefield 1815) Wakefield's account focused on one patient in particular, James Norris, an American marine reported to be 55 years of age who had been detained in Bethlem since 1 February 1800. Housed in the incurable wing of the hospital, Norris had been continuously restrained for about a decade in a harness apparatus which severely restricted his movement. (Note: On a subsequent visit on 7 June of that year, Wakefield brought an artist who made a drawing of the confined Norris. This image, which was engraved and widely distributed, became an important propaganda tool in the cause of lunacy reform.) Wakefield stated that:

... a stout iron ring was riveted about his neck, from which a short chain passed to a ring made to slide upwards and downwards on an upright massive iron bar, more than six feet high, inserted into the wall. Round his body a strong iron bar about two inches wide was riveted; on each side of the bar was a circular projection, which being fashioned to and enclosing each of his arms, pinioned them close to his sides. This waist bar was secured by two similar iron bars which, passing over his shoulders, were riveted to the waist both before and behind. The iron ring about his neck was connected to the bars on his shoulders by a double link. From each of these bars another short chain passed to the ring on the upright bar ... He had remained thus encaged and chained more than twelve years.

Wakefield's revelations, combined with earlier reports about patient maltreatment at the York Asylum, (Note: Not to be confused with the York Retreat.) helped to prompt a renewed campaign for national lunacy reform and the establishment of an 1815 House of Commons Select Committee on Madhouses, which examined the conditions under which the insane were confined in county asylums, private madhouses, charitable asylums and in the lunatic wards of Poor-Law workhouses.

In June 1816 Thomas Monro, principal physician, resigned as a result of scandal when he was accused of 'wanting in humanity' towards his patients. The Superintendent from 1852 to 1862 was William Charles Hood, who did much to reform and improve conditions for patients at the hospital.

Dr T. B. Hyslop came to the hospital in 1888 and rose to be physician in charge, bringing the hospital into the twentieth century and retiring in 1911.

== 1930–present ==
Bethlem Hospital Act 1926
- Act of Parliament
- Parliament of the United Kingdom
- Long title: An Act to provide for the removal of the Bethlem Hospital to the Monks Orchard Estate at Addington in Surrey and Beckenham and West Wickham in Kent and for the disposal of the existing hospital premises and convalescent home and the vesting of the said hospital premises or part thereof in the London County Council as an open space and for other purposes.
- Citation: 16 & 17 Geo. 5. c. xlviii

Dates
- Royal assent: 15 July 1926

Text of statute as originally enacted

In 1930, the hospital moved to the suburbs of Croydon, on the site of Monks Orchard House between Eden Park, Beckenham, West Wickham and Shirley. The old hospital and its grounds were bought by Lord Rothermere and presented to the London County Council for use as a park; the central part of the building was retained and became home to the Imperial War Museum in 1936. The hospital was absorbed into the National Health Service in 1948.

=== 750th anniversary and "Reclaim Bedlam" campaign ===
In 1997 the hospital started planning celebrations of its 750th anniversary. The service users' perspective was not to be included, however, and members of the psychiatric survivors movement saw nothing to celebrate in either the original Bedlam or in the current practices of mental health professionals towards those in need of care. A campaign called "Reclaim Bedlam" was launched by Pete Shaughnessy, supported by hundreds of patients and ex-patients and widely reported in the media. A sit-in was held outside the earlier Bedlam site at the Imperial War Museum. The historian Roy Porter called the Bethlem Hospital "a symbol for man's inhumanity to man, for callousness and cruelty."

=== Recent developments ===
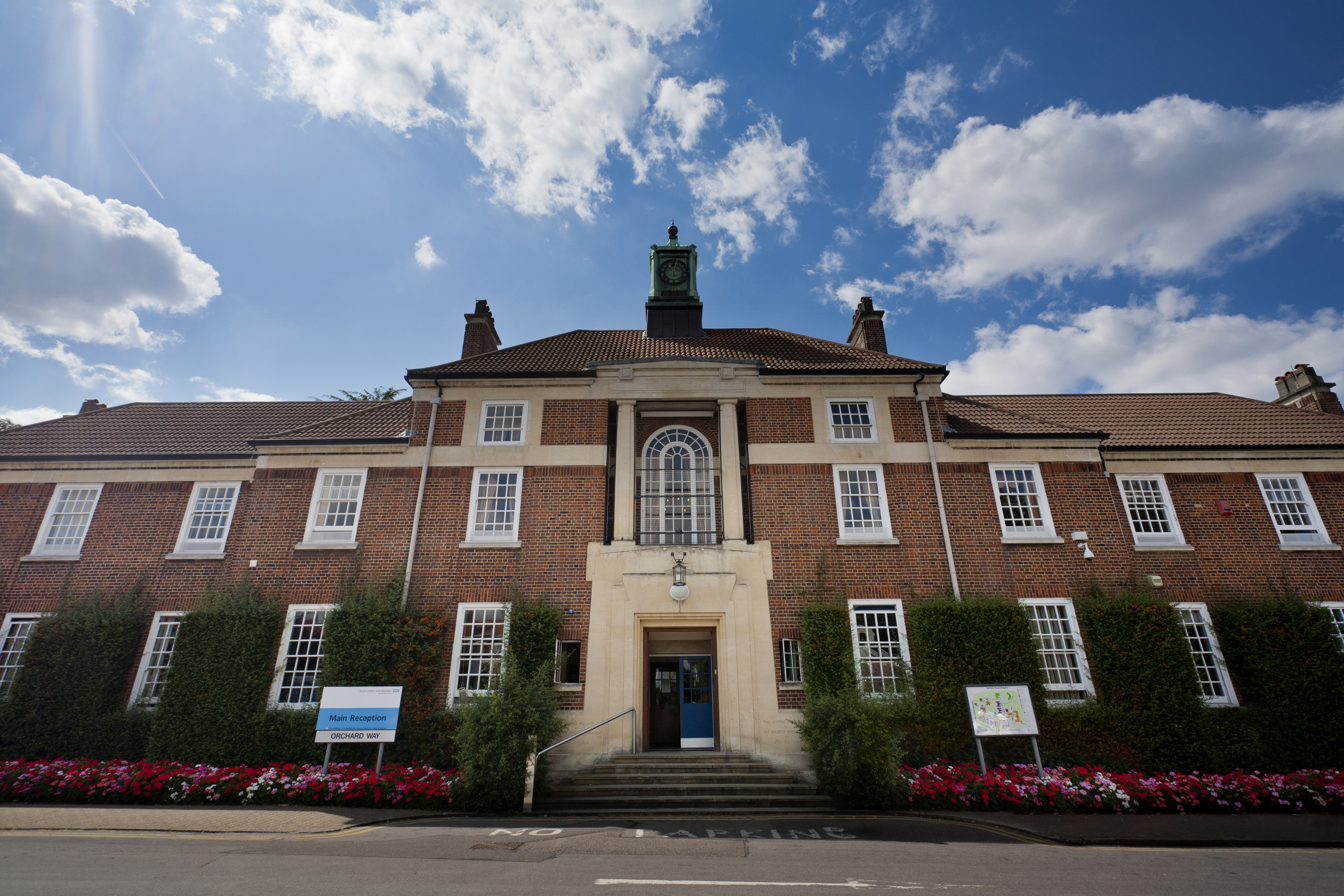
Bethlem Royal Hospital in 2011

In 1997, the Bethlem Gallery was established to showcase the work of artists that have experienced mental distress.

In 1999, Bethlem Royal Hospital became part of the South London and Maudsley NHS Foundation Trust ("SLaM"), along with the Maudsley Hospital in Camberwell, and the merger of mental health services in Lambeth and Lewisham took place.

In 2001, SLaM sought planning permission for an expanded Medium Secure Unit and extensive works to improve security, much of which would be on Metropolitan Open Land. Local residents' groups organised mass meetings to oppose the application, with accusations that it was unfair that most patients could be from inner London areas and were, therefore, not locals and that drug use was rife in and around the hospital. Bromley Council refused the application, with Croydon Council also objecting. However the Office of the Deputy Prime Minister overturned the decision in 2003 and development started. The 89-bed, £33.5m unit (River House) opened in February 2008. It is the most significant development on the site since the hospital opened in 1930.

=== Fatal restraints ===
Olaseni Lewis (known as Seni; aged 23) died in 2010 at Bethlem Royal Hospital after police subjected him to prolonged restraint of a type known to be dangerous. Neither police nor medical staff intervened when Lewis became unresponsive. At coroner's inquest, the jury found many failures by both police and medical staff which played a part in Lewis's death. They said "The excessive force, pain compliance techniques and multiple mechanical restraints were disproportionate and unreasonable. On the balance of probability, this contributed to the cause of death." Ajibola Lewis, Olaseni Lewis's mother, claimed a nurse at Maudsley Hospital where Lewis had been earlier warned against allowing his transfer to Bethlem. "She said to me, 'Look, don't let him go to the Bethlem, don't let him go there'," his mother said. A doctor later persuaded her to take her son to Bethlem hospital. She was concerned about the conditions there. "It was a mess", she told the court. "It was very confused, a lot of activity, a lot of shouting. I was not happy; I was confused."

Police were trained to view Lewis's behaviour as a medical emergency, but the jury found police failed to act on this. The jury found that "the police failed to follow their training, which requires them to place an unresponsive person into the recovery position and if necessary administer life support. On the balance of probability this also contributed to the cause of death." A doctor did not act when Lewis became unresponsive while his heart rate dramatically slowed.

The Independent Police Complaints Commission first cleared officers over the death, but following pressure from the family, they scrapped the conclusions and started a new inquiry. The IPCC was planning disciplinary action against some of the police officers involved. Deborah Coles of the charity Inquest, who has supported the Lewis family throughout their campaign, said the jury had reached the most damning possible conclusions on the actions of police and medics. "This was a most horrific death. Eleven police officers were involved in holding down a terrified young man until his complete collapse, legs and hands bound in limb restraints, while mental health staff stood by. Officers knew the dangers of this restraint but chose to go against clear, unequivocal training. Evidence heard at this inquest begs the question of how racial stereotyping informed Seni's brutal treatment."

A disciplinary hearing conducted by the Metropolitan Police found the officers had not committed misconduct. The hearing was criticised by the family because it was held behind closed doors with neither press nor public scrutiny.

In 2014, Chris Brennan (aged 15) died of asphyxiation while at Bethlem hospital after repeated self-harming. The coroner found lack of proper risk assessment and lack of a care plan contributed to his death. The hospital claimed staffing problems and low morale were factors. Lessons were learned and the adolescent unit where Brennan died was assessed as good in 2016.

In November 2017, a bill was debated in the House of Commons that would require psychiatric hospitals to give more detailed information about how and when restraints are used. This bill is referred to as "Seni's law". In November 2018, the bill received Royal Assent as the Mental Health Units (Use of Force) Act 2018.

== Facilities ==
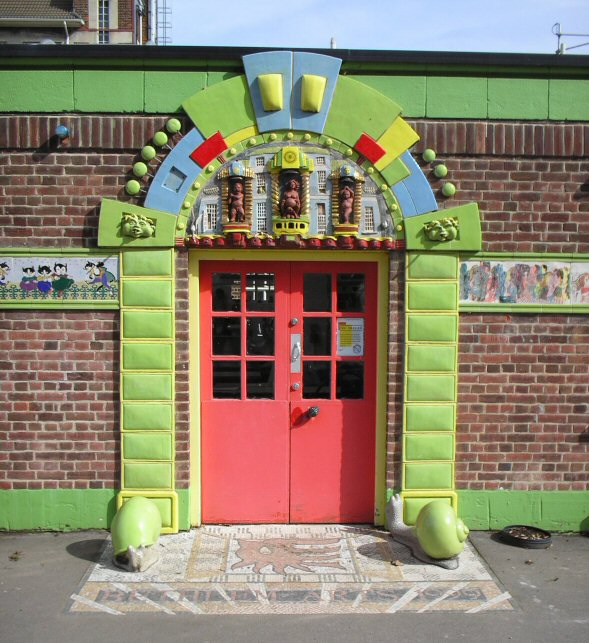
Entrance to the Occupational therapy Department

The hospital includes specialist services such as the National Psychosis Unit.

Other services include the Bethlem Adolescent Unit, which provides care and treatment for young people aged 12–18 from across the UK.

The hospital has an occupational therapy department, which has its own art gallery, the Bethlem Gallery, displaying work of current and former patients.

The Bethlem Museum of the Mind features exhibits about the history of Bethlem Royal Hospital and the history of mental healthcare and treatment. It features a permanent collection of art created by some of its patients, as well as changing exhibitions.

Every Saturday morning, a parkrun is held in the grounds of Bethlem Royal Hospital.

== Media ==
In 2013, the South London and Maudsley NHS Foundation Trust (SLaM) took part in a Channel 4 observational documentary, Bedlam. Staff and patients spent two years working with television company The Garden Productions. The four-part series started on 31 October.

The first programme, Anxiety, followed patients through the 18-bed Anxiety Disorders Residential Unit. This national unit treats the most anxious people in the country—the top one per cent—and claims a success rate of three in four patients.

The next programme was called Crisis; cameras were allowed in Lambeth Hospital's Triage ward for the first time. In a postcode with the highest rates of psychosis in Europe, this is the Accident and Emergency of mental health, where patients are at their most unwell.

The third programme, Psychosis, films a community mental health team. South London and Maudsley NHS Foundation Trust provides support for more than 35,000 people with mental health problems.

The final programme, Breakdown, focuses on older adults, including the inpatient ward for people over 65 with mental health problems at Maudsley Hospital.

== Notable patients ==
- Richard Dadd – artist
- John Frith – attempted assailant of King George III
- Mary Frith – also known as "Moll Cutpurse" or "The Roaring Girl", released from Bedlam in 1644 according to Bridewell records
- Daniel M'Naghten – catalyst for the creation of the M'Naghten Rules (criteria for the defence of insanity in the British legal system) after the shooting of Edward Drummond
- Jonathan Martin – arsonist of York Minster
- James Hadfield – attempted assassin of King George III
- Margaret Nicholson – attempted assassin of King George III
- Edward Oxford – tried for high treason after the attempted assassination of Queen Victoria and Prince Albert
- Augustus Welby Northmore Pugin (1812–1852) – English architect, best known for his work on the Houses of Parliament as well as many churches; in the last year of his life he had a breakdown, possibly due to hyperthyroidism, and was for a short period confined in Bethlem
- Hannah Snell (1723–1792) – a woman cross-dressing as a male soldier; spent the last six months of her life in Bethlem
- Bannister Truelock – attempted assassin of King George III
- Louis Wain – artist

== See also ==
- Abraham-men
- History of psychiatric institutions
- John Cutting (psychiatrist)
- Lists of hospitals
- Tom o' Bedlam, an anonymous poem c. 1600, about a Bedlamite.
- List of hospitals in England
- King's Health Partners
- Bethlem Museum of the Mind

== Bibliography ==
Primary sources

- Committee on Madhouses (1815). First Report: Minutes of Evidence Taken Before the Select Committee Appointed to Consider of Provision Being Made for the Better Regulation of Madhouses in England. London: House of Commons.
- More, Thomas (1903). D. O'Connor (ed.). The Four Last Things (1522). London: Art and Book Co.
- Saussure, César de (1902). A Foreign View of England in the Reigns of George I & II: the Letters of Monsieur César de Saussure to his Family. Edited and translated by Madame Van Muyden. London: John Murray.
- Wakefield, Edward (1812). "Plan of an Asylum for Lunatics, & c". The Philanthropist. 2: 226–29.

Secondary sources

Books

- Andrews, Jonathan; Briggs, Asa; Porter, Roy; Tucker, Penny; Waddington, Keir (1997). The History of Bethlem. London & New York: Routledge. ISBN 0415017734.
- Andrews, Jonathan; Scull, Andrew (2001). Undertaker of the Mind: John Monro and Mad-Doctoring in Eighteenth-Century England. California: California University Press. ISBN 9780520231511.
- Andrews, Jonathan; Scull, Andrew (2003). Customers and Patrons of the Mad-Trade:The Management of Lunacy in Eighteenth-Century London: With the Complete Text of John Monro's 1766 Case Book. Berkeley & Los Angeles CA: University of California Press. ISBN 9780520226609.
- Covey, Herbert C. (1998). Social Perceptions of People with Disability in History. Charles C. Thomas. ISBN 9780398068370.
- Darlington, Ida, ed. (1955). "Chapter 9: Bethlem Hospital, Now the Imperial War Museum, in Lambeth Road". Survey of London: Volume 25. St. George's Fields (The Parishes of St. George The Martyr, Southwark and St. Mary, Newington). London: London County Council.
- Dowling, William C. (2006). Oliver Wendell Holmes in Paris: Medicine, Theology and the Autocrat at the Breakfast Table. Lebanon NH: University of New Hampshire Press. ISBN 9781584655800.
- Foucault, Michel (2006). History of Madness. Edited by Jean Khalfa. Translated by Jonathan Murphy & Jean Khalfa. London & New York: Routledge. ISBN 9780415277013.
- Gilman, Sander L. (1996). Seeing the Insane. Lincoln NE: University of Nebraska Press. ISBN 9780803270640.
- Harrison, John Fletcher Clews (1979). The Second Coming: Popular Millenarianism, 1780–1850. London: Taylor and Francis. ISBN 9780710001917.
- Hill, Rosemary (2007). God's Architect: Pugin and the Building of Romantic Britain. London: Allen Lane. ISBN 978-0-7139-9499-5.
- Jackson, Kenneth S. (2005). Separate Theaters: Bethlem ("Bedlam") Hospital and the Shakespearian Stage. Newark: University of Delaware. ISBN 9780874138900.
- Jones, Kathleen (1955). Lunacy, Law and Conscience, 1744–1845. The Sociology of Mental Health. New York & London: Routledge. ISBN 9780415178020.
- Kathol, Roger G.; Gatteau, Suzanne (2007). Healing Body and Mind: A Critical Issue for Health Care Reform. Westport CT: Praeger. ISBN 9780275992019.
- Kent, Deborah (2003). Snake Pits, Talking Cures and Magic Bullets. Brookfield CT: Twenty-First Century Books. ISBN 9780761327042.
- MacDonald, Michael (1981). Mystical Bedlam: Madness, Anxiety and Healing in Seventeenth-Century England. Cambridge: Cambridge University Press. ISBN 9780521273824.
- Neely, Carol Thomas (2004). Distracted Subjects: Madness and Gender in Shakespeare and Early Modern Culture. New York: Cornell University Press. ISBN 9780801489242.
- Noll, Richard (2007). The Encyclopedia of Schizophrenia and Other Psychotic Disorders (3rd ed.). New York: Facts on File. ISBN 9780816075089.
- Oberhelman, David D. (1995). Dickens in Bedlam: Madness and Restraint in his Fiction. York Press. ISBN 9780919966963.
- O'Donoghue, Edward Geoffrey (1914). The Story of Bethlem from its Foundation in 1247. London: T.F. Unwin.
- Parry-Jones, William Llywelyn (1971). The Trade in Lunacy: A Study of Private Madhouses in England in the Eighteenth and Nineteenth Centuries. London: Routledge & Kegan Paul. ISBN 9780802001559.
- Phillips, Bob (2007). Overcoming Anxiety and Depression. Eugene OR: Harvest House Publishers. ISBN 9780736919968.
- Poole, Steve (2000). The Politics of Regicide in England, 1760–1850: Troublesome Subjects. Manchester: Manchester University Press. ISBN 9780719050350.
- Porter, Roy (2002). Madness: A Brief History. Oxford: Oxford University Press. ISBN 9780192802675.
- Porter, Roy (2006). Madmen: A Social History of Madhouses, Mad-Doctors & Lunatics (revised ed.). Stroud: Tempus. ISBN 0752437305.
- Reed, Robert R. (1952). Bedlam on the Jacobean Stage. Cambridge, Mass.: Harvard University Press.
- Scull, Andrew (1993). The Most Solitary of Afflictions: Madness and Society in Britain, 1700–1900. New Haven & London: Yale University Press. ISBN 0300107544.
- Scull, Andrew; MacKenzie, Charlotte; Hervey, Nicholas (1996). Masters of Bedlam: The Transformation of the Mad-Doctoring Trade. Princeton NJ: Princeton University Press. ISBN 0691034117.
- Skultans, Vieda (1979). English Madness: Ideas on Insanity, 1580–1890. London: Routledge. ISBN 9780710003294.
- Smith, Leonard D. (1999). Cure, Comfort and Safe Custody: Public Lunatic Asylums in Early Nineteenth-Century England. London & New York: Leicester University Press. ISBN 9780718500948.
- Tuke, Daniel Hack (1882). Chapters in the History of the Insane in the British Isles. London: Keegan Paul, Trench & Co.
- Walford, Edward (1878). "Chapter XXVI, St. George's Fields". Old and New London: Volume 6. Cassell Petter & Galpin.

Journals articles and book chapters

- Allderidge, Patricia (1979a). "Management and Mismanagement at Bedlam, 1547–1633". In Webster, Charles (ed.). Health, Medicine and Mortality in the Sixteenth Century. Cambridge: Cambridge University Press. pp. 141–164. ISBN 9780521226431.
- Allderidge, Patricia (1979b). "Hospitals, Madhouses and Asylums: Cycles in the Care of the Insane". British Journal of Psychiatry. 134 (4): 321–34. doi:10.1192/bjp.134.4.321. PMID 376023.
- Allderidge, Patricia (1985). "Bedlam: Fact or Fantasy?". In Bynum, W.F.; Porter, Roy; Shepherd, Michael (ed.). The Anatomy of Madness: Essays in the History of Psychiatry. Vol. 2. London & New York: Tavistock. ISBN 9780415008594.
- Andrews, Jonathan (1994). "'Hardly a Hospital, but a Charity for Pauper Lunatics'? Therapeutics at Bethlem in the Seventeenth and Eighteenth Centuries". In Barry, Jonathan; Jones, Colin (ed.). Medicine and Charity before the Welfare State. London: Routledge. pp. 63–81. ISBN 9780415111362.
- Andrews, Jonathan (1995). "The Politics of Committal to Early Modern Bethlem". In Porter, Roy (ed.). Medicine in the Enlightenment. Amsterdam & Atlanta GA: Rodopi. pp. 6–53. ISBN 9789051835625.
- Andrews, Jonathan. Monro, Thomas (1759–1833) (January 2010). "Oxford Dictionary of National Biography". Oxford Dictionary of National Biography (Online ed.). Oxford: Oxford University Press. doi:10.1093/ref:odnb/18981. (Subscription, Wikipedia Library access or UK public library membership required.) (subscription required)
- Birken, William. Crooke, Helkiah (1576–1648) (2004). "Oxford Dictionary of National Biography". Oxford Dictionary of National Biography (Online ed.). Oxford: Oxford University Press. doi:10.1093/ref:odnb/6775. (Subscription, Wikipedia Library access or UK public library membership required.) (subscription required)
- Gibson, Katharine. Cibber, Caius Gabriel (1630–1700) (2008). "Oxford Dictionary of National Biography". Oxford Dictionary of National Biography (Online ed.). Oxford: Oxford University Press. doi:10.1093/ref:odnb/5415. (Subscription, Wikipedia Library access or UK public library membership required.) (subscription required)
- Griffiths, Paul. Frith, Mary (1584x9–1659) (2008). "Oxford Dictionary of National Biography". Oxford Dictionary of National Biography (Online ed.). Oxford: Oxford University Press. doi:10.1093/ref:odnb/10189. (Subscription, Wikipedia Library access or UK public library membership required.) (subscription required)
- Hattori, Natsu (1995). "'The Pleasure of your Bedlam': The Theatre of Madness in the Renaissance". History of Psychiatry. 6 (23): 283–308. doi:10.1177/0957154X9500602302. PMID 11639849.
- Jackson, Kenneth S. (2000). "'I know not / Where I did lodge last night?': King Lear and the Search for Bethlem (Bedlam) Hospital". English Literary Renaissance. 30 (2): 213–40. doi:10.1111/j.1475-6757.2000.tb01170.x.
- Moran, Richard (1985). "The Modern Foundation for the Insanity Defense: the Case of James Hadfield (1800) and Daniel McNaughtan (1843)". Annals of the American Academy of Political and Social Science. 447: 31–42. doi:10.1177/0002716285477001004.
- Moss, David J.. Wakefield, Edward (1774–1854) (2008). "Oxford Dictionary of National Biography". Oxford Dictionary of National Biography (Online ed.). Oxford: Oxford University Press. doi:10.1093/ref:odnb/28414. (Subscription, Wikipedia Library access or UK public library membership required.) (subscription required)
- Phillpotts, Christopher (2012). "Richard II and the Monasteries of London". In Ormrod, W. Mark (ed.). 14th Century England. Vol. 7. Woodbridge: Boydell Press. pp. 197–224. ISBN 9781843837213.
- Porter, Roy (1997). "Bethlem/Bedlam: Methods of Madness?". History Today. 47 (10): 41–8.
- Scull, Andrew (1999). "Bethlem Demystified?". Medical History. 43 (2): 248–55. doi:10.1017/s0025727300065133. PMC 1044737. PMID 16562315.
- Scull, Andrew (21 March 2007). "The Fictions of Foucault's Scholarship". Times Literary Supplement.
- Stevenson, Christine (1996). "Robert Hooke's Bethlem". Journal of the Society of Architectural Historians. 55 (3): 254–275. doi:10.2307/991148. JSTOR 991148.
- Stevenson, Christine. The Architecture of Bethlem at Moorfields (1997). History of Bethlem. Jonathan Andrews, Asa Briggs, Roy Porter, Penny Tucker & Keir Waddington. London & New York: Routledge. pp. 230–59. ISBN 0415017734.
- Vincent, Nicholas (1998). "Goffredo de Prefetti and the Church of Bethlehem in England". Journal of Ecclesiastical History. 49 (2): 213–35. doi:10.1017/S0022046998006319.
- Wheelwright, Julie. Snell, Hannah (1723–1792) (2008). "Oxford Dictionary of National Biography". Oxford Dictionary of National Biography (Online ed.). Oxford: Oxford University Press. doi:10.1093/ref:odnb/25975. (Subscription, Wikipedia Library access or UK public library membership required.) (subscription required)
- Whittaker, Duncan (1947). "The 700th Anniversary of Bethlem". Journal of Mental Science. 93 (393): 740–47. doi:10.1192/bjp.93.393.740.

Theses

- Andrews, Jonathan (1991). Bedlam Revisited: A History of Bethlem Hospital c. 1634 – c. 1770 (PhD thesis). London: Queen Mary and Westfield College, London University.

Newspapers and news agencies

- Olden, Mark (23 January 2003). "Obituary: Peter Shaughnessy. Campaigner who took the stigma out of insanity". Guardian. p. 22.
- Cooke, Matthew (30 October 2008). "£33m goes to 760-year-old hospital". BBC London.
- Today Programme (8 August 2008). "Lunatic London". BBC, Radio 4.

Webpages

- Archives and Museum (30 October 2012a). "About the Museum". Archives and Museum, Bethlem Royal Hospital.
- Archives and Museum (30 October 2012b). "Art". Archives and Museum, Bethlem Royal Hospital.
- Bethlem Gallery (23 October 2012). "About Us". Bethlem Gallery.
- Gale, Colin S. (19 March 2012). "The Bethlem Hospital". London: "The Lost Hospitals of London" Monday at One Series, Gresham College. Archived from the original on 29 May 2012.
- SLaM (30 October 2012a). "Psychosis Service". National Services: A Resource for Mental Health Workers. South London and Maudsley NHS Foundation Trust.
- SLaM (30 October 2012b). "Interactive Tour of Bethlehem Adolescent Unit". National Services: A Resource for Mental Health Workers. South London and Maudsley NHS Foundation Trust.
