= Orangewood Album =

Earliest known photo album of Disneyland

The Orangewood Album is the earliest known photograph album of Disneyland, a theme park in Anaheim, California, believed to have been assembled from 1954-1955 by a high level Disney executive. The album contains more than 600 original photos of Disneyland construction through opening day. It includes never-before-seen photos of Walt Disney, Roy Disney, Joe Fowler, C.V. Wood, sponsors and celebrities, earliest construction images of the lands, and the earliest known images of children inside of Disneyland. All the photographs were taken by Mell Kilpatrick, copyrighted by Carlene Thie / Ape Pen Publishing.

== History ==
The team that discovered the Orangewood Album met with Disney Archives on December 4, 2015. All photos and notes in the album were reviewed. Of particular interest during this meeting was a series of photos of the earliest known documented children inside Disneyland. These photos alone rewrite an important piece of Disneyland history.

The images of these children date back to January 1955 based upon the condition of the park. They predate, by 5 months, the previous “First Kids to Visit Disneyland” photos, as officially stated by the Disney Company. Until the Orangewood Album was found, it was believed that Sybil Stanton and Bill Krauch were the first kids to visit Disneyland in June 1955. These Children are known to be Carlene Thie’s cousins.

In these photos, the Sleeping Beauty Castle is still under extensive construction as well as other buildings and lands. The children are seen holding hands as they walk through Main Street, Fantasyland, Frontierland, backstage, and other areas. The most prominent photos in this series are of the two children holding hands on the bridge of the Sleeping Beauty Castle. One photo shows the boy pointing up to the half built Castle. The other is a close-up and shows the children gazing through the walkway of the Castle that is partially covered with construction materials.

These photographs are also the only known images of these first kids inside Disneyland.

== Content ==
The Orangewood Album consists of more than 600 original photos of Disneyland construction through opening day. The photos start from the first days of construction in July 1954 and go through to July 1955. The album presents the photographs in a mostly chronological order starting with the first arrival of construction crews to the development site. These are followed by photos showing the first construction of buildings and famous landmarks like Sleeping Beauty Castle, the Main Street Train Station, and the Jungle Cruise, to name a few.

Several aerial shots are presented throughout the entire album, documenting the complete construction process. These include very early 1954 views of construction and through to opening day, showing the first crowds entering the park.

A few of the photos include never before seen photos of Walt Disney (especially a photo of Walt and Joe Fowler walking down Main Street, in front of a trolley full of guests on opening day), earliest known photo of Sleeping Beauty Castle being built, earliest known photo of Main Street Train Station being built, only known photo of Walt Disney’s Carolwood Pacific Railroad "Lilly Belle" train being worked in the shop at the Disney Studios, earliest known photo of the Mark Twain Riverboat being tested, the earliest known photo of track being laid for the Train, the earliest known photos of the C.K. Holiday and E.P. Ripley locomotives, an image of Elias Disney’s window when only his name had been painted on, only known photo of water being pumped into the Castle moat, only known photo of the Firehouse Five Plus Two band playing in the Disneyland bandstand (and on opening day), first known photo of the tram running on opening day, only known photo of the Disneyland Trolley arriving to the park, several photos of celebrities and sponsors, several photos from opening day, and “Castle in the Sand” (as has been named by historians, as it’s the only known photo showing the full front of the Castle with only sky above and dirt below, since construction had not completed yet on surrounding buildings, paved road, etc.).

== Origin theories ==
=== Created by Mell Kilpatrick ===
The Orangewood Album has been examined by Disneyland historians and determined it was assembled from 1954-1955 based on the album manufacturer, style, materials, photograph type and content, internal notes, and other factors. Because of limited access to original developed photographs of Disneyland construction through opening day during any time, it known that this was a personal album of Mell Kilpatrick, who was the creator of the album.Mell was also known to have limited access to Disneyland. He was the Chief Photographer of the Santa Ana Register. This is also supported by Mells granddaughter Carlene Thie. There were also the hand written notes in the album regarding original sponsors of Disneyland including, but not limited to, Maxwell House, Richfield, and Goodyear. This photos will all eventually be available at the Getty. https://www.gettyimages.com/search/2/image?family=editorial&phrase=Mell%20Kilpatrick%20

=== Created by Mell Kilpatrick/ C.V. Wood ===
The first employee of Disneyland and General Manager of the park was C.V. Wood. Though his historical role in the creation of Disneyland has been removed from Disney publication, he was responsible for overseeing the construction of the park, reporting directly to Walt Disney and Roy Disney.

It is theorized by some historians that C.V. created the Orangewood Album as there are more than 30 photos of C.V. in the album, yet this isn't the case. Mell Kilpatrick, was the photographer who created this album and copyrights are the sole property of Carlene Thie. In the Orangewood Album, there is entire pages dedicated to him posing with sponsors. Because C.V. was heavily involved with bringing in the original 33 sponsors of Disneyland. The timeline of the album also aligns with the time that C.V. was working on Disneyland, prior to his termination by Roy Disney. The first page showing any person in the album is also of C.V. Wood, as well as the last.

== Status ==
The Orangewood Album is currently offered for sale in its entirety by The Collector's Shelf, a vintage photography store. This does not include any copyrights to any of the images. These rights are the sole property of Carlene Thie / Ape Pen Publishing. All individual photos have been put onto the Getty, for licensing. https://www.gettyimages.com/search/2/image?family=editorial&phrase=Mell%20Kilpatrick%20
