= John Mell =

John Mell (d. 1579) was one possessor of the keepership of the Bethlem Royal Hospital, or "Bedlam", who began his role as keeper in 1576, following Richard Munnes (a draper) and then Edward Rest (a grocer).

Mell's occupation is unknown, but he was appointed directly by "the lord mayor and court of aldermen," and was responsible to report to the "three surveyors of Bedlem." Mell was in part responsible for the poor state of the hospital, as he dishonestly refused to give account of any legacies the hospital received, and even "discouraged the benevolent from giving at all," and was "grossly insult[ing]" towards the surveyors. In July 1579, Mell was reported to have been dismissed, due to his abuse towards the surveyors and by committing "other disorders jointly with his wife." Defiant at the dismissal, Mell resisted until his death in December of that same year, at which point the post was freed and given to Roland Slethord (a clothworker).
