= English Literary Renaissance =

- Discipline: English literature
- Language: English
- Edited by: Joseph Black, Mary Thomas Crane, Jane Hwang Degenhardt, Adam Zucker

Publication details
- History: 1971–present
- Publisher: University of Chicago Press for the Arthur F. Kinney Center for Interdisciplinary Renaissance Studies, University of Massachusetts Amherst (United States)
- Frequency: Triannual

Standard abbreviations
- ISO 4: Engl. Lit. Renaiss.

Indexing
- ISSN: 0013-8312 (print); 1475-6757 (web)
- LCCN: 72613136
- JSTOR: 00138312
- OCLC no.: 905635332

Links
- Journal homepage; Online access; Online archive; Ingenta archive

English Literary Renaissance is a peer-reviewed academic journal dedicated to the study of English literature from 1485 to 1665. Besides scholarly articles, it publishes rare texts and manuscripts from the period. It was established in 1971 and is edited by Joseph Black, Mary Thomas Crane, Jane Hwang Degenhardt, and Adam Zucker. The journal is published by the University of Chicago Press and covers Shakespeare, Donne, Edmund Spenser, and John Milton, among other Tudor and early Stuart authors.
