= Mell Kilpatrick =

Mell Kilpatrick (1902–1962) was an American photographer, recognized mostly for his work for the Santa Ana Register, known today as the Orange County Register. While working as the chief photographer for the Santa Ana Register, Kilpatrick took thousands of photographs of car crash scenes and police work around the Orange County area in California. He was also one of the few photographers allowed into Disneyland during its construction in 1954–55. In 1958 Mell was the only photographer taking photos for Walt Disney for about a year and a half..

Since Walt Disney and mell had a good working relationship, Walt asked Mell to use his darkroom to develop the first images of Disneyland. This opened the door for Mell to be the only outside photographer to have unlimited access to Disneyland. The first images of Disneyland were developed in Kilpatrick's tiny Santa Ana darkroom in 1954 and 1961. He continued taking photographs of Disneyland through the early 1960s, until close to his death in 1962.

== Biography ==
Kilpatrick originally moved to Southern California to work as a musician. His first job was at the Dianna Ballroom where he played the cornet. His music career was cut short in 1947 when he developed periodontal disease. Turning to work as a projectionist, Kilpatrick found a strong interest in the field of photography. He initially took photos of car crashes for insurance companies. His work eventually caught the eye of the Santa Ana Register.

== Santa Ana Register ==
Kilpatrick began work as a photographer for the Santa Ana Register in 1948, documenting grand openings, parades, and many other official photo opportunities. However, he is best known for his photos taken for insurance evidence including documenting car crashes for the California Highway Patrol. To help capture photographs early on scene he developed the first dashboard mounted camera. Kilpatrick's unique perspective on death with his photography innovation caught the attention of Walt Disney.

== Disneyland ==
Prior to Disneyland opening on July 17, 1955, Kilpatrick was sought by Walt Disney to photograph its construction. Being so far from Burbank, Disney had few personnel and structural resources, including a dark room. Kilpatrick offered both his dark room and services to Disney. Taking full opportunity of his press pass to the construction site, Kilpatrick photographed every phase of construction from the first leveling of dirt up through opening day, and beyond. Other photographers had documented the construction but only during short visits just prior to opening day. Delmar Watson visited the park a couple months prior to opening to take photos of the Sleeping Beauty Castle and other landmarks of the park. Mell's, son-inlaw Blaine Sissel, and his wife Katherine Kilpatrick also worked at the Disneyland Park. Renie Bardeau also took a few selected photos of Walt Disney inside the park. The far majority of existing photos of construction of the park are from Kilpatrick's work.

Such work by Kilpatrick had been unseen for decades after his death until his granddaughter Carlene Thie, of Ape Pen Publishing, found surviving photos and negatives of his work, including early car crash scenes of Anaheim and Disneyland construction through opening day, and up until close to his death. Carlene Thie, is one of only seven who retain the rights to Disneyland images for the 1950s. Thie has published five books that present Kilpatrick's lost work titled, A Photographer's Life with Disneyland Under Construction, Disney Early Years Through the Eye of a Photographer, Disney Years Seen Through a Photographer's Lens, Disneyland the Beginning, and Homecoming Destination Disneyland, which was handed out to the press on the 50th anniversary of the park.

Ten years after Thie's last book publication featuring Kilpatrick's photos of Disneyland, the Orangewood Album was found. The Orangewood Album is a collection of more than 600 original Kilpatrick photos of Disneyland construction. The photos were developed and stamped with his mark in 1954 and 1955. They appear to be selected photos of Disneyland construction, opening day, celebrities, and more. An interesting find of the Orangewood Album is the discovery of two children, a young boy and girl, visiting the park months before Sybil Stanton and Bill Krauch. Stanton and Krauch visited the park in June 1955, about a month before the park opened, and are celebrated every year by Disney for being the first kids inside the park. These images are copyrighted by Carlene Thie, just like the other images Mell Kilpatrick took, which can all be lease on Getty
