= F4N =

The mouse-derived erythroleukemia cell line F4N (MEL) is an aneuploid cell line, comes from mouse inbred strain DBA/2. It was established in 1977. Eight percent of the total number of cells in culture undergo spontaneous apoptosis.
