= Southern Illinois University =

Public university system in Illinois

- Type: System of public universities
- Established: 1869; 157 years ago
- Endowment: $548.1 million (2020)
- President: Daniel F. Mahony
- Location: Carbondale, Edwardsville, Springfield, Illinois, United States
- Website: siusystem.edu

Southern Illinois University Locations.

Southern Illinois University is a system of public universities in the southern region of the U.S. state of Illinois. Its headquarters is in Carbondale, Illinois.

== Board of trustees ==
The university is governed by the nine member SIU Board of Trustees. Seven members are appointed by the governor and confirmed by the state senate. Two members are elected by the student bodies of the Carbondale and Edwardsville campuses.

== Southern Illinois University Carbondale ==
Founded in Carbondale in 1869 as Southern Illinois Normal College, Southern Illinois University Carbondale (SIUC, usually referred to as SIU) is the flagship campus of the Southern Illinois University system and is the third oldest of Illinois's twelve state universities.

SIUC includes eight colleges: the College of Agriculture, The College of Science, the College of Arts and Media, the College of Business and Analytics, the College of Engineering, the College of Health and Human Sciences, the College of Social Sciences, and the College of Humanities. It also includes four schools: the Graduate School, the School of Education, the School of Law in Carbondale, and the School of Medicine in Carbondale and Springfield (see below).

The university offers 120 undergraduate majors, 80 master's degrees, 40 doctoral degrees, and professional degrees in law and medicine. Morris Library serves as the research hub on campus. It contains five million volumes and 63,000 periodical subscriptions, numbers which place it in the top 50 of U.S research libraries.

In the fall of 2021, SIUC enrolled 18,667 students – 12,647 undergraduates, 5,568 graduate students, and 551 professional doctoral students. It has over 250,000 alumni.

Their athletic program is part of Missouri Valley Conference of NCAA Division I.

== Southern Illinois University Edwardsville ==
Southern Illinois University Edwardsville (SIUE) is the St. Louis Metro East campus of the SIU system. The main campus in Edwardsville is situated on 2,660 acres (1,080 ha) of scenic woodland and lakes with bicycle and walking paths throughout. SIUE also operates the School of Dental Medicine campus in Alton, the East St. Louis Center, the School of Nursing's satellite campus in Springfield, and the School of Nursing's program on the SIU Carbondale campus. Begun as residential centers of SIUC in 1957, SIUE celebrated its 50th anniversary in 2007. Once known as a "commuter school", SIUE has in recent years transformed itself into a residential university.

SIUE includes the College of Arts and Sciences and seven schools, including the Graduate School and the School of Pharmacy on the Edwardsville campus and the School of Dental Medicine in Alton.

The SIUE center in East St. Louis provides clinical and practicum experiences for SIUE students and a broad range of assistance to the community in the arts, education, health, and social services.

Considered to be a "Doctoral/Professional University", SIUE offers Baccalaureate, Post-Baccalaureate, Masters, and Doctoral degrees in 48 undergraduate programs and 65 graduate and professional practice programs. In addition, students may enroll in 62 undergraduate minors.

In the fall of 2021, SIUE had 13,010 students – 9,967 undergraduates and 3,043 graduate students including 312 professional doctoral students, and 118,029 alumni.

Their athletic program is part of Ohio Valley Conference of NCAA Division I.

== Satellite schools and facilities ==
=== Southern Illinois University School of Medicine ===
The Southern Illinois University School of Medicine (SIU-SOM) is a part of SIUC that operates its first-year program in Carbondale and the final three years in Springfield.

==== Simmons Cancer Institute ====
The Simmons Cancer Institute is a medical education, biomedical research, patient care, and community service facility in Springfield operated by the SIU-SOM.

==== SIU Healthcare Clinics ====
The SIU-SOM operates five satellite family medicine clinics for residential training of family physicians in Carbondale, Decatur, Quincy, and Springfield.

=== Southern Illinois University School of Dental Medicine ===
The Southern Illinois University School of Dental Medicine (SIU-SDM or SDM) is a part of SIUE and is located in Alton on the campus of the former Shurtleff College. The school opened in 1972 and enrolls about 200 dental students. The school also operates the East St. Louis Dental Clinic at SIUE's East St. Louis Center.

=== Southern Illinois University Edwardsville School of Nursing ===
Southern Illinois University Edwardsville School of Nursing not only has academic programs on the Edwardsville campus, but it operates a cooperative program with SIUC in Carbondale, and it has a small campus in Springfield which offers graduate level courses nearby the SIU School of Medicine. The school also operates the Community Nursing Services office at SIUE's East St. Louis Center.

=== Southern Illinois University School of Aviation ===
SIU Carbondale operates aviation programs at the Transportation Education Center, located at the Southern Illinois Airport, about 15 minutes from the main campus. They have a flight school, and an aviation mechanic school. Students learn to fly, read instruments, and fix aircraft. There are several donated planes that they use to work on, but do not fly. Private citizens, airlines, and the navy have donated planes to SIU Carbondale.

=== East St. Louis Center ===
The SIUE East St. Louis Center offers services and training to more than 6,000 people annually. Programs include the SIUE East St. Louis Charter High School, a Head Start program, a Latchkey Program providing families with after-school care for children ages 6 to 12, the SIUE East St. Louis Center Performing Arts Program, the Community Nursing Services office of the SIUE School of Nursing, the East St. Louis Dental Clinic of the SIUE School of Dental Medicine, an eye care clinic, and the adjacent East St. Louis Higher Education Campus which houses the East St. Louis Community College Center.

=== University Center of Lake County ===
SIUC and SIUE are among the twenty colleges and universities offering classes for degree completion and continuing education through the University Center of Lake County in Grayslake and Waukegan.

=== Center for Workforce Development ===
The SIUC Center for Workforce Development in Springfield is operated by the Organizational Learning, Innovation and Development Department (former Workforce Education and Development) of the School of Education at Southern Illinois University Carbondale. Programs include Illinois workNet, providing adults and youth with disabilities the resources to help them reach educational and employment goals; the Website Development Project, working with the Illinois Department of Employment Security to redesign the agency's website to provide improved access to the department's services by individuals, businesses, and the departmental staff; Illinois Pathways, a STEM education improvement program supported by six other State of Illinois agencies; and the SIUC Workforce Education and Development program's Off Campus Undergraduate Program on the campus of Lincoln Land Community College, which provides a one-year degree completion program for students who have already received an Associate Arts or Associate of Science degrees from Illinois community colleges.

== Presidents and chancellors of SIU ==
=== Presidents of Southern Illinois University system ===
The following persons have served as president of SIU system:

No.	President SIU System	Term start	Term end	Ref.
1	Delyte Morris	1948	1970	
2	Kenneth Shaw	September 15, 1979	1986	
3	Lawrence Pettit	1986	1991	
4	James Brown	1992	1995	
5	Ted Sanders	1995	January 31, 2000	
interim	Frank E. Horton	February 1, 2000	September 30, 2000	
6	James E Walker	October 1, 2000	December 31, 2005	
7	Glenn Poshard	January 1, 2006	April 30, 2014 (Note: Although Poshard original announced that we would retire on June 30, Poshard agreed to serve in an advisory role to Dunn when Dunn was told to leave his previous job earlier than expected and the SIU trustees allowed Dunn to start a month early.)	
8	Randy Dunn	May 1, 2014	July 30, 2018	
interim	J. Kevin Dorsey	July 17, 2018	February 28, 2019	
9	Daniel F. Mahony	March 1, 2020	present	

Table notes:

=== Chancellors of Southern Illinois University Carbondale ===
The following persons have served as chancellor of the Carbondale campus:

No.	SIUC Chancellors	Term start	Term end	Ref.
Presidents of Southern Illinois Normal University (1869–1947)
1	Robert Allyn	July 1, 1874	1892	
2	John Hull	1892	1893 (Note: Resigned to lead the State Normal School in River Falls, Wisconsin.)	
3	Harvey W. Everest	1893	1897	
4	Daniel B. Parkinson	1897	1913	
5	Henry W. Shryock	1913	April 13, 1935 (Note: Died in office)	
6	Roscoe Pullium	1935	March 27, 1944	
7	Chester F. Lay	1945	1948	
Presidents of Southern Illinois University (1947–1995)
8	Delyte W. Morris	1948	1970	
9	Robert G. Layer	1971	1972	
10	David R. Derge	1972	1974	
interim	Hiram H. Lesar	1974	1974	
11	Warren W. Brandt	December 1974	1979 (Note: Resigned for job with the University of Maryland system.)	
interim	Hiram H. Lesar	1979	1980	
12	Albert Somit	August 15, 1980	1987	
interim	John C. Guyon	1987	1987	
13	John C. Guyon	1987	August 15, 1996	
Chancellors of Southern Illinois University Carbondale (1995–present)
14	Don Beggs	August 16, 1996	June 30, 1998	
15	Jo Ann E. Argersinger	July 1, 1998	June 5, 1999 (Note: Fired by Board of Trustees.)	
interim	John S. Jackson	June 5, 1999	June 30, 2001	
16	Walter V. Wendler	July 1, 2001	November 14, 2006	
interim	John M. Dunn	November 15, 2006	June 30, 2007	
17	Fernando Treviño	July 1, 2007	March 18, 2008 (Note: Placed on administrative leave.)	
acting	Don Rice	March 18, 2008	April 11, 2008	
interim	Samuel Goldman	April 11, 2008	May 31, 2010	
19	Rita Cheng	June 1, 2010	July 7, 2014 (Note: Resigned to lead Northern Arizona University.)	
acting	Paul D. Sarvela	July 8, 2014	July 24, 2014	
interim	Paul D. Sarvela	July 24, 2014	November 9, 2014	
interim	William Bradley Colwell	October 1, 2015	June 30, 2017	
20	Carlo Montemagno	August 15, 2017	October 11, 2018	
acting	J. Kevin Dorsey	October 11, 2018	December 31, 2018	
interim	John M. Dunn	January 1, 2019	June 30, 2020	
21	Austin A. Lane	July 1, 2020	present	

Table notes:

=== Chancellors of Southern Illinois University Edwardsville ===
The following persons have served as chancellor of the Edwardsville campus:

No.	SIUE Chancellors	Term start	Term end	Ref.
Vice President for the Southwest Illinois Campus (1955–1960)
–	Harold W. See	September 1, 1955	November 29, 1960	
Vice President for Operations (1961–1964)
1	Clarence W. Stephens	August 11, 1961	1964	
Presidents of Southern Illinois University Edwardsville (1971–1995)
2	John S. Rendleman	July 1, 1968	March 4, 1976 (Note: Died in office)	
acting	Andrew J. Kochman	March 11, 1976	October 14, 1976	
acting	Ralph W. Ruffner	October 14, 1976	January 16, 1977	
3	Kenneth Shaw	January 17, 1977	September 14, 1979 (Note: Resigned to become SIU system president.)	
interim	Earl Lazerson	September 15, 1979	July 10, 1980	
4	Earl Lazerson	July 10, 1980	January 10, 1994	
Chancellors of Southern Illinois University Edwardsville (1995–present)
5	Nancy Belck	January 11, 1994	August 31, 1997 (Note: Resigned to lead the University of Nebraska Omaha.)	
6	David Werner	September 1, 1997	June 30, 2004	
7	Vaughn Vandegrift	July 1, 2004	June 30, 2012	
8	Julie A. Furst-Bowe	July 1, 2012	August 14, 2015 (Note: Resigned for a position at Chippewa Valley Technical College.)	
interim	Stephen Hansen	August 15, 2015	July 31, 2016	
9	Randy Pembrook	August 1, 2016	February 28, 2022	
10	James T. Minor	March 1, 2022	present	

Table notes:
