= Don Jones (arts) =

American artist

Don Jones (March 15, 1923 – January 28, 2015) was an American artist and art therapist, fourth American Art Therapy Association (AATA) President, Honorary Life Member of AATA, and one of five founders of the American Art Therapy Association.

== Life and work ==
Don Jones is recognized as one of the pioneers of art therapy. Jones’ contributions to the field of art therapy include serving in professional and community positions. In addition, as one of the five founding members of American Art Therapy Association (AATA), he was influential in the formation of the AATA. Jones also served as president, training influential art therapists and creating permanent pieces of artwork.

Don Jones almost drowned at the age of four, but was rescued and resuscitated by his older brother. Jones first started drawing after his near-drowning. He credits art with helping him overcome the traumatic experience. For 16 years, he repeatedly drew and painted boats and different forms of water. He mastered visual representation of water surfaces by that time, which helped him to process the drowning incident by re-enacting it through his art. As a teenager, Jones taught himself to paint, starting with oils. He realized during the art process that it was different from the art curriculum he learned in school. Don felt release.

At the age of 18, Jones registered for World War II draft as a "conscientious objector." He also enrolled at Marietta College to study theology and medicine, but quit after the first year. At 19, recognised as a conscientious objector, he became a member of the Civilian Public Service Corps, and volunteered to work in the Marlboro Psychiatric Hospital for the following three years. Jones worked alone in the wards with the chronically mentally ill, eight hours a day, six days a week. In Bruce Moon’s film, Art is Life is Art, Jones said the Marlboro State Hospital was where he recognized how art positively affected patients. He called the state hospital his "university of psychiatry".

Jones had a theme for art therapists to remember: “openness creates openness.” His drowning experience as a child taught him that phrase, and the time at the state hospital reinforced it. The thought behind this expression is—if a person opens himself emotionally to others, the safer those people will feel with him.

Jones found work as a commercial artist after World War II and settled into Rossville, Kansas with his wife, Eleanor (nee Illston), and children; David, Amy, Evan, Anne, Matthew and Peter. In this community, he served as a pastor, artist, mentor and friend to many people. Always an artist before any other role, Don did not leave a blank wall unpainted in Rossville. He formed a group to help paint murals at the high school and community center, continued his own series of paintings, and taught a night class. Some of his students had connections to the Menninger Clinic in Topeka, Kansas, and Don soon received a call from Karl Menninger. Dr. Menninger wanted to show his paintings. Jones said to exhibit his paintings, Menninger had to hire him on staff.

Don had his way, and was hired in 1951 to join the adjunctive staff at the world-famous psychiatric facility. It was at the Menninger clinic where Don Jones developed a drawing assessment that used mental imagery. Called the "Don Jones Assessment", it combined guided imagery and drawing while patients remained in a relaxed state. Subjects imagined a journey, and stopped at four important points. At each point, they were asked how they would proceed, and drew a picture of the imagery. Each invented situation was cautiously designed to embody a different kind of universally stressful problem. Structured questions followed the exercises. The "Don Jones Assessment" was found to be useful in both assessing and treating individuals.

Menninger hired Margaret Naumburg by Jones' suggestion, and helped to establish a new concept of "process vs. content" at the hospital. Jones’ view was to pay attention each patient's art process, while Naumburg's position was to psychoanalyze the content or result of every art piece.

In his 16 years at Menninger, Jones also trained Robert "Bob" Ault, which led to Ault's hiring at the foundation in 1960. Jones and Ault started to consider the art process as a diagnostic tool. Together, they pioneered to develop some of the first clinical internship training programs in the United States, and acted on the Steering Committee that established the American Art Therapy Association.

It was not until 1969 when the American Art Therapy Association became nationally known; this formation recognized art therapy as a professional field. By this time, Jones worked as the director of the adjunctive therapies department in Harding Hospital for two years. Located in Worthington, Ohio, the hospital developed and acted upon the idea that every possible experience could be therapeutic. In 1974, Bruce Moon was hired onto the staff after a one-year clinical apprenticeship. Don Jones became his mentor, and continues to be today. To Moon, Jones is a father, a legend and a friend.

As an art therapist, Jones relied on the arts and the self. In order to be of help to another, it is important to know oneself. He stressed that in order to be an art therapist, one needs to be an artist. Being away from studio for too long caused burnout of an art therapist, Jones described. Unlike other mental health professionals, Jones was insistent that the patients' or clients' work is theirs to keep. They are the artists.

Even in retirement, Don Jones was still an active painter in his art studio. He continued to assist the Worthington Area Art League that started in his basement 35 years ago, supervised students and consulted with various treatment programs. Jones died in January 2015.
