= The Gardens at SIUE =

Botanical garden in Edwardsville, Illinois

Coordinates: 38°48′32″N 89°59′34″W

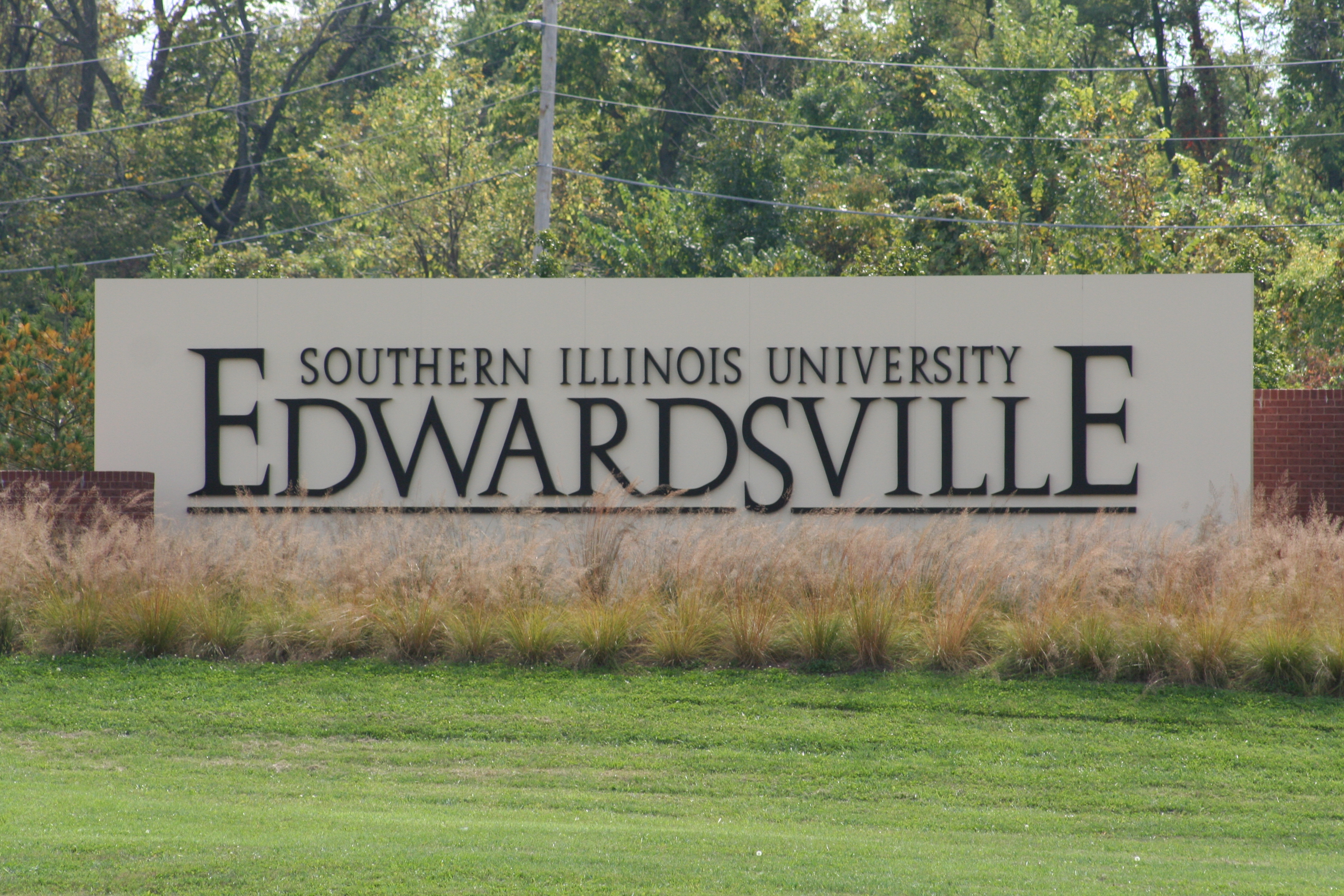
- Entry sign at Southern Illinois University Edwardsville
- Type: Public University Botanical Garden
- Location: Edwardsville, Illinois, United States
- Website: Official website

The Gardens at SIUE is a botanical garden on the campus of Southern Illinois University Edwardsville (SIUE). It originated as an arboretum and occupies a 35 acres (14 ha) tract of the university's 2,660 acres (1,080 ha) campus at Edwardsville, Illinois. It serves as a twofold function as a living laboratory dedicated in support of the educational and research missions of the university and as a place of beauty for the university community to share with the general public. In light of this duality, the gardens' master plan calls for the creation of a "public garden featuring spectacular horticulture, event spaces, areas for social gatherings and contemplative gardens" to be continuously enhanced over the coming years. The Gardens at SIUE was recognized by the Missouri Botanical Gardens as a "Signature Garden" until the MOBOT program was discontinued.

== History ==
In April 1990, Donal Myer, dean of the former SIUE School of Sciences, announced that planning had begun for the creation of a campus arboretum, to be sited north of the parking area for the Tower Lake (now Cougar Lake) recreation area. The arboretum had been a part of the plans for the university from its beginnings but nothing had been done until Frank Kulfinski, professor of Environmental Sciences, suggested that it was time to start. Following Myer's death that August, the SIU Board of Trustees named the arboretum in his honor, and Kulfinski became its first director.

In the ensuing years, the tree collection was broadened and diversified, and the arboretum saw much use as both an educational tool and as a recreational destination for the SIUE community.

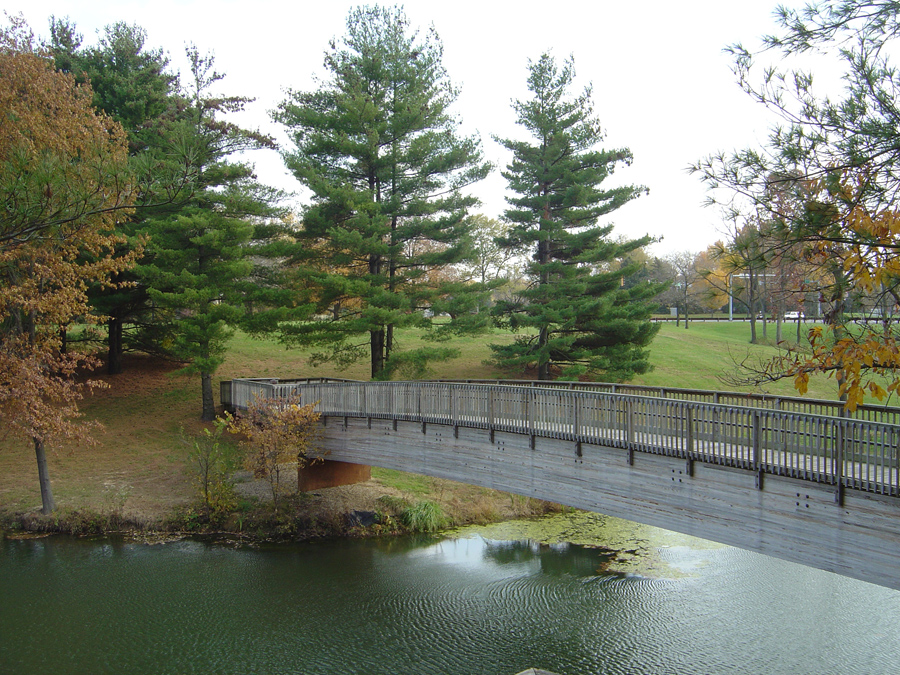
The bridge over Turtle Pond in The Gardens at SIUE. Fall 2005.

In the late 1990s, funds were raised to further develop the site. Among the improvements, a permanent sign was erected and a bridge was built across Turtle Pond. In 1998, the Donal G. Myer Arboretum was rededicated.

In 2003, the Missouri Botanical Gardens' president Dr. Peter Raven created the Metro-east Outreach Advisory Committee, chaired by SIUE alumnus Ralph Korte and directed with discovering ways to amplify the Missouri Botanical Gardens' image in the Metro East region. This committee created the concept of "Signature Gardens", and the Donal Myer Arboretum was chosen as one of three Signature Gardens in the Metro East.

In 2004, Terra Design Studios of Pittsburgh was hired to assist a planning team, consisting of SIUE Foundation staff; SIUE faculty, staff, and administration; and Metro East community members in developing a master plan for the arboretum. This process established a plan for the site which more resembled a public botanical garden than a conventional arboretum, resulting in the conclusion that the Myer Arboretum would become a part of a larger entity—The Gardens at SIUE.

In 2005, SIUE hired Doug Conley as the first full-time director of The Gardens. Doug served as Director until July 2011 when he became Director of the Edsel Ford House Gardens and later Garden Coordinator for the University of Michigan Matthaei Gardens.

In April 2006 the 1st Annual Arbor Day event hosted 30 volunteers. In May of the same year, Rita Hardy donated a set of wind sculptures to The Gardens, and in September, The Hardy Family Wind Forest was dedicated at a "Garden Party" attended by more than 200 guests and featuring comments by Raven and SIUE Chancellor Vaughn Vandergrift.

With the completion of The Gardens Master Plan, The Friends of The Gardens at SIUE was formed in 2007. The 2nd Annual Arbor Day event was attended by 59 volunteers and 30 visitors; the event was a combination work and educational event, as volunteers removed weeds and planted trees, while visitors were instructed on the value of trees.

With support from Doug Conley, the University, the Friends of The Gardens, and other donors, development of The Gardens at SIUE has continued.

In January 2012, Jane Drake was appointed as The Gardens second director and served in that post until March 2014.

On September 1, 2014, the directorship of The Gardens was added to the duties of James Pennekamp, special assistant to the chancellor for Regional Economic Development and executive director of University Park at SIUE.

In 2016, the Illinois state budget crisis brought about severely reduced funding for The Gardens. Because of The Gardens' increasing popularity, the mayor of Edwardsville proposed that the city take over the site's care and a survey was done of the Edwardsville citizens. An initial City Council vote regarding leasing of The Gardens appeared to be approved but was later reversed. The university never leased The Gardens to the City. Instead, with major hands-on help from a group of community Master Gardeners and Master Naturalists led by Marian Smithson and Bill Hanke, the university has continued to manage The Gardens.

== Features ==
Among the features of The Gardens at SIUE are:

- The Butterfly Garden--- A gift from Julie Ruth as a remembrance to her daughter Maria who died while attending SIUE initiated the first area of the Butterfly Garden in 2014. Further development, including an iron sculpture of a butterfly has occurred during 2017-2019. The area is designed with plants that attract local butterfly species.
- The Garden Path wanders for half a mile through The Gardens, leading visitors to its many features.
- The Donal Myer Arboretum--- Established in 1990 and named in honor of the late Donal G. Myer, a biologist and dean of the former SIUE School of Sciences, the Arboretum is a collection of labeled trees and shrubs native to the region in a natural setting.
- The Donal Myer Arboretum Plaza --- A plaza surrounded with bench seating at the south entrance to The Gardens.
- The Prairie Portal --- A 1 acre (0.40 ha) garden created by the Edwardsville Rotary Club in 2012 that will function as a portal from the Garden Path to a not yet constructed path, the Prairie Loop.
- The Hardy Family Wind Forest--- A set of kinetic sculptures by Lyman Whitaker are set in motion by the wind, creating ever-changing images. The set includes The Double Spinner, The Fleur-de-Lis, the Double Helix, The Desert Flame, and the Double Dancer. The sculptures were donated by Rita Hardy of Highland.

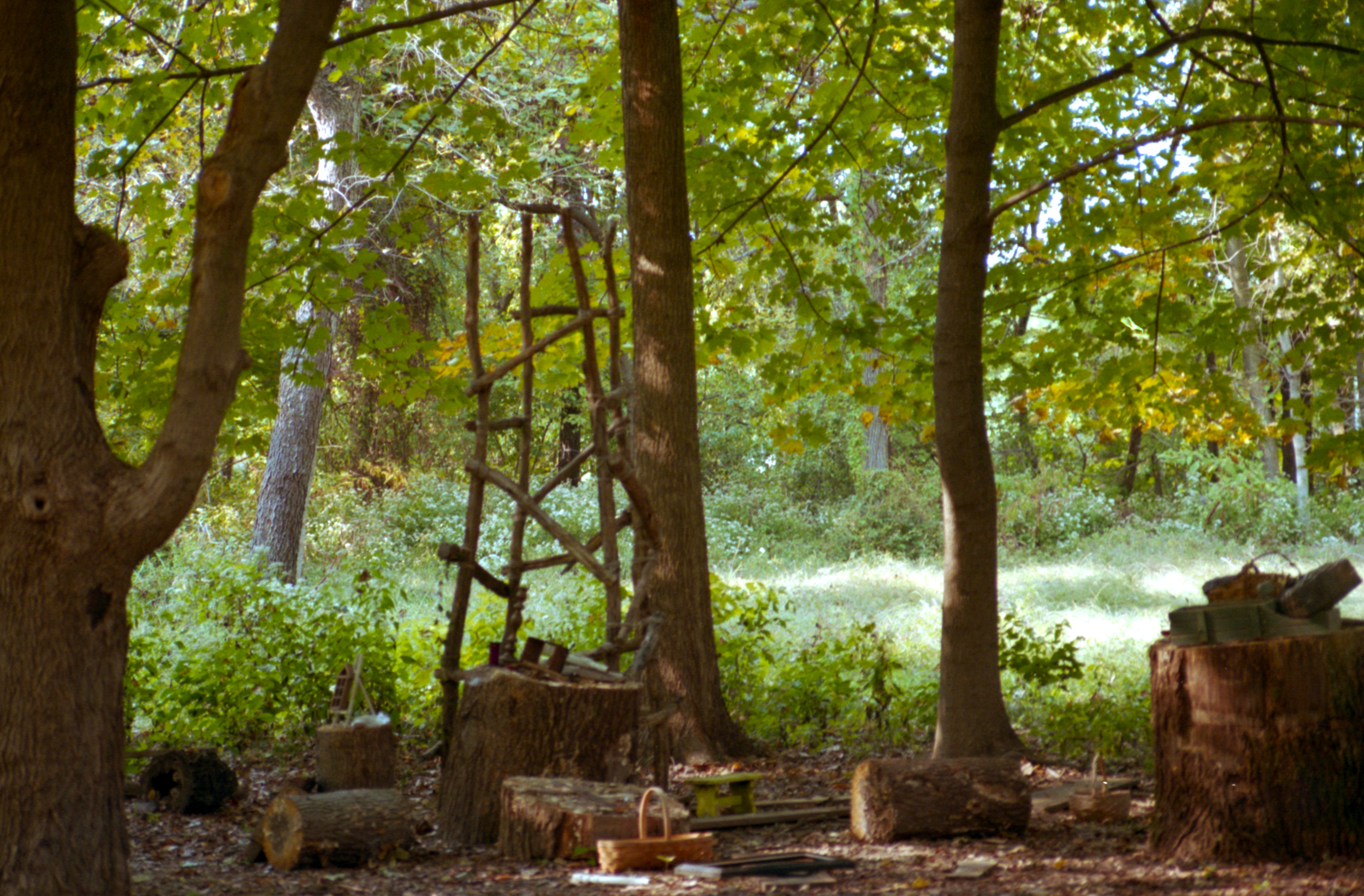
An example of some of the Art For The Earth at The Gardens at SIUE

- The Lantern--- A path over the bridge and through the pines leads to a plaza where a small amphitheater faces the oriental influenced pergola sited on the edge of Turtle Pond. A place for small gatherings or quiet contemplation, the Lantern was conceived by students in SIUE's nationally recognized Senior Capstone project of the School of Engineering and designed by Jamie Henderson of Henderson Associates Architects. Constructed of stone and cedar, the Lantern looks out upon the fountain in Turtle Pond and has a set of LEDs that light it at night, providing the image that gives it its name.
- Art For The Earth--- Artworks installed in honor of Earth Day and using "green" approaches to art. Some works are installed for a specified period, others are biodegradable and return to the earth over time. New works are installed each April.
- The Prairie House--- (Originally scheduled 2012-13 but on hold as of 2020.) will serve as a permanent venue for special events and classes, featuring indoor and outdoor classroom and meeting spaces, restrooms, a green room for event preparation, an outdoor kitchen, and patio and lawn areas.
- The Presidents' Way --- A series of benches along a section of the Garden Path which commemorates former presidents of the SIUE Foundation.
- Oak Savannah --- A restored piece of natural Illinois prairie planted in 2000 by the SIUE Department of Biological Sciences. More than 40 native plants were included in the initial planting.
- The Council Ring --- Based upon Native American council circles, this is a stone landscaped meeting area constructed in 2011 with a donation from the Inman Family.
- Frog Marsh --- A marshy arm of Cougar (Tower) Lake preserved as natural habitat for indigenous amphibians and reptiles.

Additional References

== Location ==
The Gardens at SIUe are located on Arboretum Lane, going south off Cougar Lake Road on the SIUE campus. They are also accessible by the Delyte Morris Bike Trail, which connects with the Madison County Transit Nature Trail.

== See also ==
- List of botanical gardens in the United States
