= Robert Ault =

American art therapist

Robert Ault (1936–2008) was an American art therapist who was the co-founder of American Art Therapy Association, the founder of the Master's of Science in Art Therapy program at Emporia State University, and the founder of the Kansas Art Therapy Association. He was a recipient of 10th Honorary Life Member of the American Art Therapy Association and the Kansas Outstanding Educator award.

== Life and work ==
=== Childhood ===
Bob Ault was born in 1936 in Corpus Christi, Texas. In the fifth grade, his teacher, Miss Love, noticed his talent for art and recommended art lessons. Ault was voted into the South Texas Art League at the age of 14. He was the youngest member ever allowed in.

=== Education ===
Ault went to University of Texas at Austin to receive his Bachelor of Fine Arts in painting. He then chose to attend Wichita State University for his Master of Fine Arts, never planning to stay in Kansas once he completed it. Ault found that his graduate fellowship did not call for him to teach at the University, but at the Institute of Logopedics. This institution specialized in communication disorders and was interested in setting up an art program. Having a graduate student do the work solved the problem. Ault was not immediately interested, but decided to persevere for the next two years while he completed his MFA.

As it turned out, his experiences there helped shape the rest of his career. Many of the children at the institute had cerebral palsy or other kinds of brain damage. Ault was sent to a classroom with another woman to help students make art and quickly found the work was enjoyable. He said that the art room was a place where he could use his creativity to generate meaningful interactions.

One boy in particular influenced Ault greatly. "Tom" was 14 and had suffered whooping cough at a young age that had left him with severe expressive-receptive aphasia; it left him without the ability to understand or speak language. At first, Ault was unsure of how to handle the situation, so they just played and drew pictures of each other. Tom seemed to enjoy this, so Ault drew a cartoon of Tom getting up from the table, going out the door, and then coming back inside. Upon seeing this, Tom got up and did the actions shown in the picture. Ault pointed out this moment as one that changed both of their lives forever; Ault became an art therapist and Tom was finally able to communicate. They worked out a language of symbols to communicate by and distributed it to those who Tom knew. Soon, Tom was running errands for people throughout the institute. Years later, Ault found out that Tom’s family had moved him back to Nebraska, where Tom gave everyone in town a set of his symbols. Ault believed experiences like this were what the art therapy profession was all about.

=== Art therapy at the Menninger Institute ===
In 1961, Ault returned from duty and applied for a position at the Menninger Foundation in the activity department. He was hired and found a new friend in his colleague Don Jones. Although he commonly used art to work with patients, Jones did not call himself an art therapist. Ault and Jones knew of people on the East Coast who practiced art analysis, but they saw themselves separate from this group. They even discussed the potential of a national organization that focused on the curative powers of art. Jones eventually left Menninger’s and went to take a director position at Harding Hospital in Ohio, while Ault became the director of Menninger’s Creative Arts Clinic.

=== The American Art Therapy Association ===
Soon after Jones left, Ault received word from psychologist and art therapist, Myra Levick that there was to be a meeting in Philadelphia concerning the beginnings of a national art therapy association. Levick organized the meeting despite major resistance. Ault was eventually elected to the committee to write the American Art Therapy Association’s (AATA) constitution and bylaws. In 1971, Ault became the second president of AATA.

=== Education programs ===
The University of Kansas (KU) Lawrence approached Ault in 1970 to form an art therapy master’s program. Although this may have come as good news, Ault was never allowed to teach a class in Lawrence and so he resigned in 1973. According to Ault, the KU psychology department saw those in the arts as a “bunch of hippies who shouldn’t be on campus”. Meanwhile, Ault taught classes at Menninger’s in Topeka until he decided that KU was not interested in starting an art therapy program, but preventing him from starting one at another university.

The same week that Ault resigned from KU, a group of students at Emporia State University (ESU) asked to speak with Ault about art therapy. The next day, Ault received a call from ESU, and in a month’s time they had set up a Master of Science in Psychology with a specialty in Art Therapy. Ault led the program and taught halftime there until he retired in 1995. Ault was still employed at Menninger’s but had mixed feelings about his work there. He loved the patients and colleagues, but was often frustrated by the lack of respect for art therapy. He was never allowed to even have a business card until a secretary forged an order for a set. They had been judged not professional enough to deserve cards, although Ault carried a full case load and charged full fees for services . This frustration caused Ault to look for ways to cut ties with Menninger’s. In 1978, Ault established Ault’s Academy of Art in Topeka. This was a small school and private practice in art therapy that intended to put people at ease and suit his clients. Ault also found time to work on his own art there. In fact, in 1993, he retired from Menninger’s and in 1995, resigned from ESU in order to pursue work at his studio. Ault felt that it was time for him to become more selfish with his time and focus on his own practice in order to live a less stressful life.

=== Other accomplishments ===
Ault faced occasional health problems but continued to work at his studio full-time until he was hospitalized in October 2007 for respiratory difficulties. He died on February 5, 2008. Ault was 71 years old and left behind his wife, two children, and four grandchildren.

Ault also worked to found the Kansas Art Therapy Association (KATA) and worked toward getting state licensure for art therapists. He was honored with many awards, including the Kansas Outstanding Educator and the tenth Honorary Life Member of AATA.

== Personal life ==
Ault met a young speech therapist, Marilynn Miller, and fell in love. Ault returned to Texas after graduation, but was miserable without her, so he followed her to Topeka and they got married.

Marilynn was hired by the Institute of Logopedics to run a field center in Topeka, while Ault faced the possibility of being drafted by the army. Ault decided to join the army reserve in order to avoid the draft and served six months of active duty. He had been married for two weeks before he had to report to Fort Leonard Wood in Missouri, but Marilynn brought him crayons and paper that he kept hidden so he could practice art in secret.
