= Southern Illinois University School of Dental Medicine =

Dental school in Alton, Illinois, US

Coordinates: 38°54′13″N 90°08′36″W

SIUE School of Dental Medicine
- Type: Public university
- Established: 1972
- Dean: Bruce E. Rotter
- Faculty: 49
- Doctoral students: 221
- Location: Alton, Illinois, U.S.
- Website: www.siue.edu/dentalmedicine

Southern Illinois University School of Dental Medicine is an academic unit of Southern Illinois University Edwardsville (SIUE) located in Alton, Illinois, United States, in the Greater St. Louis area. The school is one of three dental schools in the state of Illinois and is mandated with the mission "to improve the oral health of the people of Southern Illinois and the region through education, patient care, scholarship and service".

A part of the Southern Illinois University system, the school has nearly 200 students (about 50 in each entering class) and provides a fully accredited and nationally recognized dental education.

== History ==
The SIU School of Dental Medicine was established in 1972 to provide a source of dentists in the southern half of Illinois.

Its campus was one of two residential centers of SIUE from 1957 until the opening of the Edwardsville campus in 1965 and saw only limited use from 1965 to 1972.

The school graduated its first class of dental practitioners in 1975, and, with the Commencement of the Class of 2016, the School has trained more than 1,800 dentists.

== Facilities ==
The SIU School of Dental Medicine occupies the 26 acres (11 ha) former Shurtleff College campus in the Upper Alton neighborhood of Alton for its primary teaching facilities and clinics.

The Main Clinic (built 1984, renovated 2005) is the site of most student practical experience and provides patient dental care at 72 patient-care stations. Its Advanced Practice Wing (built 2006) allows pre- and post-doctoral students to gain experience in diagnosis, treatment planning, surgery, and prosthodontic treatment for implant dentistry in its classroom (Roller Hall) and at an additional 24 patient-care stations.

The Multidisciplinary Laboratory building, the former clinic building (renovated 1995) contains Hoag Hall (a classroom), a pre-clinical technique laboratory equipped with computers at every work station, a University Food Service kiosk, a student lounge, and the campus fitness center.

The Administration Building, the school's Science Building, the Biomedical Library branch of Lovejoy Library, the campus Information Technology offices, the Shurtleff College gymnasium, and several small buildings housing the school's Departments and their facilities are also on the Alton campus.

The community-based East St. Louis Dental Clinic is located at the SIUE East St.Louis Center and allows students to provide dental care to an economically disadvantaged area.

Students at the School of Dental Medicine campus in Alton have access to the facilities of the entire main SIUE campus at Edwardsville via public bus transportation connecting the two.

== Academics ==
For the continuing education of dental professionals, the School of Dental Medicine conducts a series of lectures, clinics, and workshops throughout the year, often co-sponsored by other agencies, such as the Illinois State Dental Society.

== Departments ==
The SIU School of Dental Medicine includes the following departments:

- Department of Applied Dental Medicine
- Department of Growth, Development & Structure
- Department of Restorative Dentistry
- Department of Graduate Education

== Accreditation ==
The SIU School of Dental Medicine is fully accredited by the Commission on Dental Accreditation of the American Dental Association (ADA).

The Endodontic Residency and Periodontics Residency programs offered in cooperation with St.Louis University are also accredited by the Commission on Dental Accreditation of the ADA.
