= WSIE =

Radio station at Southern Illinois University Edwardsville

- Edwardsville, Illinois; United States
- Broadcast area: Greater St. Louis
- Frequency: 88.7 MHz

Programming
- Format: Jazz, Blues, R&B

Ownership
- Owner: Southern Illinois University Edwardsville; (Board of Trustees, Southern Illinois University)

History
- First air date: September 4, 1970
- Call sign meaning: Southern Illinois Edwardsville

Technical information
- Licensing authority: FCC
- Class: B
- ERP: 50,000 watts
- HAAT: 152 meters (499 ft)
- Transmitter coordinates: 38.793405°N 89.998927°W

Links
- Public license information: Public file; LMS
- Website: siue.edu/wsie/index.shtml

WSIE is a public radio station in Edwardsville, Illinois. Owned by Southern Illinois University Edwardsville, it is the primary jazz station for the Greater St. Louis area. Rebranding as "The Sound" in August 2016, WSIE broadcasts jazz, smooth jazz, blues, and R&B, and is the anchor station for SIUE Sports' Cougar Network.

Licensed by the Federal Communications Commission in January 1969, WSIE operates with 50,000 watts of effective radiated power (ERP) at 88.7 megahertz in the FM band.

A long time member of National Public Radio, they do not broadcast NPR anymore. WSIE's music programming is locally produced. The station's studios are in Dunham Hall, and the transmitter and 420 feet (130 m) tower are located near the Supporting Services Building on the SIUE campus.

WSIE is used as a training ground for students of the SIUE Mass Communications Department. Among broadcasters who received training at WSIE are Frank O Pinion (John Craddock); Megan Lynch, Ralph Graczak and Tom Calhoun of KMOX; Dewayne Staats (currently the play-by-play commentator with MLB's Tampa Bay Rays on Sun Sports); Paul Schankmann; Elizabeth Erwin; Steve Jankowski (previous General Manager); Sara Wojcicki; Frank Akers; Tom Dehner; and Tom Casey. The current General Manager is Jason Church.

WSIE also streams its programming on the internet. A separately programmed web-radio operation was previously run by WSIE, but it is now operated independently, although it remains a university activity.

In 2016, WSIE faced the potential loss of its state appropriation due to the Illinois state budget crisis. The SIUE administration ordered WSIE to become self-sustaining by 2017, necessitating fundraising. The station receives tax-deductible donations on its website. Its budget is made up of underwriting (similar to advertising) and donations. Today, the station receives no state funding.

== See also ==
- List of jazz radio stations in the United States
