= Dewayne Staats =

American sportscaster (born 1952)

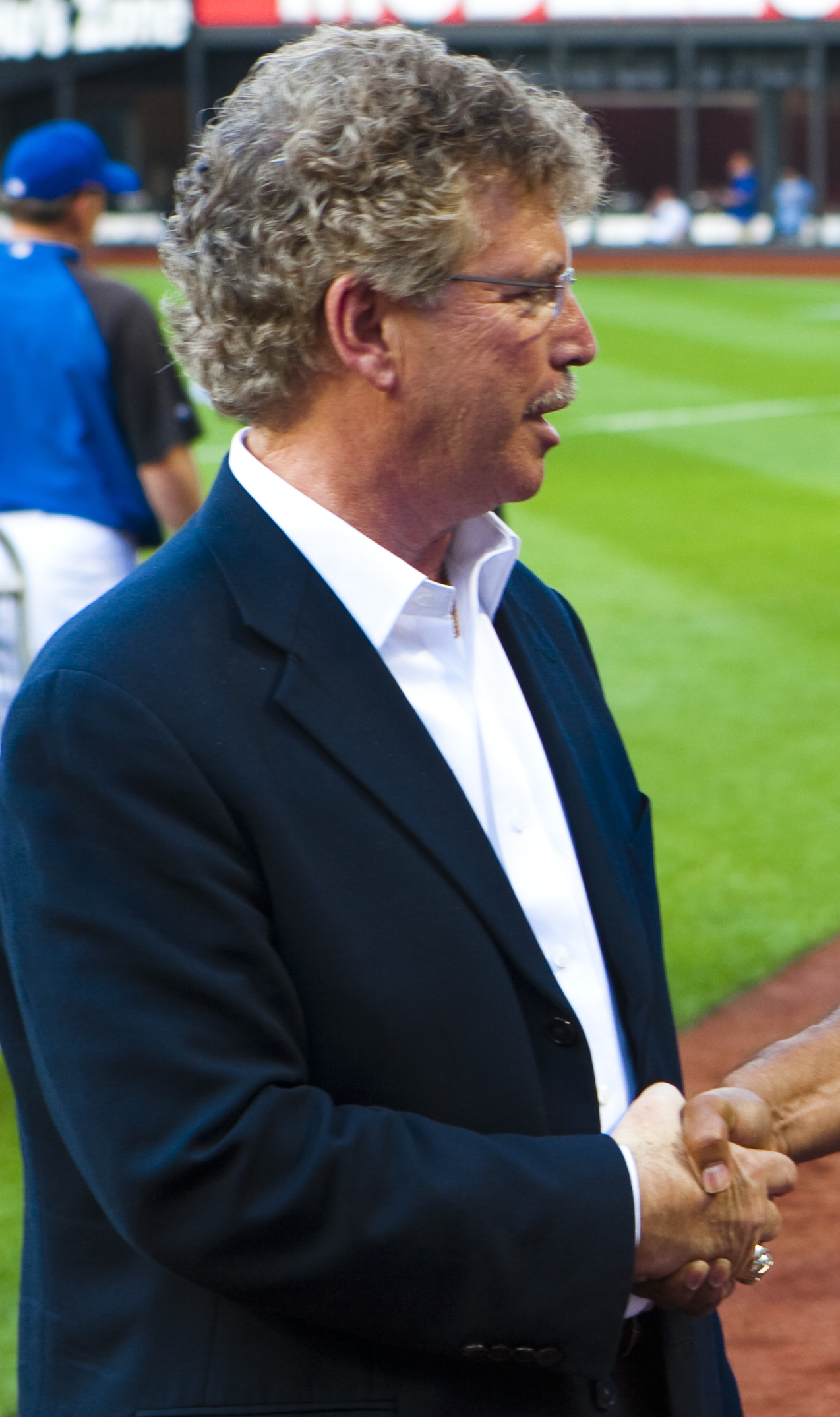
- Staats in 2009
- Born: August 8, 1952 (age 74); Advance, Missouri, U.S.
- Sports commentary career
- Teams: Houston Astros (1977–1984); Chicago Cubs (1985–1989); New York Yankees (1990–1994); Tampa Bay Rays (1998–present)
- Genre: Play-by-play
- Sport: Major League Baseball

Dewayne Staats (born August 8, 1952) is an American sports broadcaster who has been the television play-by-play announcer for the Tampa Bay Rays since their inception in 1998. He is currently teamed with color commentator Brian Anderson.

Staats has been a broadcaster for several teams over his 40+ year career.

== Biography ==
Staats regularly listened to the St. Louis Cardinals baseball broadcasts, featuring Harry Caray and Jack Buck. He graduated from Southern Illinois University Edwardsville (SIUE) in 1975 with a degree in Mass Communications. He began his broadcasting career reporting sports on WSIE, the SIUE radio station; as an announcer for high school sports on several of the nearby small town radio stations such as WOKZ in Alton, Illinois; and as an intern at KMOX in St. Louis.

Staats began announcing professional baseball with the Oklahoma City 89ers (1973–1974) while still a student at SIUE. After graduation, he was sports director at KPLR-TV in St. Louis (1975–1976), then he worked for the Houston Astros (1977–1984), Chicago Cubs (1985–1989), New York Yankees (1990–1994), and ESPN (1995–1997) before joining the Rays in their 1998 inaugural season.

Staats' first wife, Dee, died in 2005 after a long battle with cancer. He has since remarried to the former Carla Berry. He has two daughters, Stephanie (b. 1978) and Alexandra (b. 1984), from his first marriage. Stephanie is married to former MLB relief pitcher Dan Wheeler, who played with five major league teams, including the Devil Rays / Rays - the name change happened after the 2007 season - (the team for which Staats announces) from 1999–2001 and from 2007–2010. As of 2014, Staats has three grandchildren, Gabriel, Zachary, and Evie.

== Highlights and honors ==
With the Cubs, Staats called the first MLB night game in Wrigley Field history with Steve Stone on August 8, 1988, although the game was canceled due to rain.

Staats celebrated his 30th season as a Major League Baseball announcer in 2006, and on June 22, 2010, he called his 5000th major league game.

Among the several no-hitters Staats has announced were Nolan Ryan's fifth on September 26, 1981 for the Houston Astros, Jim Abbott's on September 4, 1993 for the New York Yankees, and Matt Garza on July 26, 2010 for the Tampa Bay Rays.

Staats announced college football and college basketball games during his tenure at ESPN.

As a promotion in 2006, dual talking bobblehead dolls of Staats and Joe Magrane were given away at a home game against the Seattle Mariners.

The Dewayne Staats Award for Broadcast Journalism was established in 2008 by the Mass Communications Department at SIUE. This award "recognizes a student who exhibits Staats’s passion for sports, and who demonstrates the writing, announcing and analytical skills needed to excel in the field of Sports Journalism." He was named recipient of the SIUE Distinguished Alumnus of the Year Award in 1987. He became a member of the SIUE Alumni Hall of Fame in 2006 and of the SIUE Athletics Hall of Fame in 2012.

Staats has been repeatedly nominated for the Ford C. Frick Award, the broadcasters' path to the Baseball Hall of Fame, since 2008.

Staats and his broadcast team have won multiple local Emmy awards from the Suncoast Chapter of the National Academy of Television Arts and Sciences.
