= Frances F. Kaplan =

Art therapist (1937–2018)

Frances Fisher Kaplan (1937–2018) was known for her work in the field of art therapy. She was the editor of Art Therapy: Journal of the American Art Therapy Association from 2001 until 2005.

== Education ==
Kaplan obtained a chemistry degree from Florida State University in 1960 and then earned an M.P.S. from the Pratt Institute. She finished her doctorate in art therapy from New York University in 1985. She worked as an art therapist in New Jersey, starting at Morristown Memorial Hospital in 1976, and then worked at the Carrier Foundation Psychiatric Hospital until 1986. She then moved to Hofstra University from 1989 until 1996, Portland State University (1998 until 2003), and then started at Marylhurst University where she was named associate professor in 2008.

== Career ==
Kaplan is known for her work in the field of art therapy where she promoted science-based research on the impact of art therapy practices. Starting in New Jersey, she worked on developing the process of using art therapy to help people. Kaplan was the editor of Art Therapy: Journal of the American Art Therapy Association from 2001 until 2005.

Kaplan died on March 17, 2018.

== Selected publications ==
- Kaplan, Frances Fisher (1991-01-01). "Drawing assessment and artistic skill". The Arts in Psychotherapy. 18 (4): 347–352. doi:10.1016/0197-4556(91)90074-K. ISSN 0197-4556.
- Kaplan, Frances F. (1994-01-01). "The Art of Anger". Canadian Art Therapy Association Journal. 8 (1): 18–29. doi:10.1080/08322473.1994.11432200. ISSN 0832-2473.
- Kaplan, Frances (2000). Art, science, and art therapy : repainting the picture. London: Jessica Kingsley Publishers. ISBN 1-4175-5384-7. OCLC 56930316.
- Kaplan, Frances F. (2007). Art Therapy and Social Action. Jessica Kingsley Publishers. ISBN 978-1-84310-798-9.

== Honors and awards ==
In 2003, the American Art Therapy Association honored Kaplan with their distinguished service award.
