= SIUE Graduate School =

Coordinates: 38°47′36″N 89°59′52″W

- Type: Public
- Dean: Jerry Weinberg
- Location: Edwardsville, Illinois, U.S.
- Website: www.siue.edu/graduate

Southern Illinois University Edwardsville Graduate School is a post-graduate academic unit of Southern Illinois University Edwardsville (SIUE) located in Edwardsville, Illinois, United States. It offers 48 master's degree programs, 2 specialist degrees, 17 post-baccalaureate and post-masters certificates, doctoral programs in Education Administration and Nursing Practice, and three cooperative Doctor of Philosophy programs with SIU Carbondale.

== Graduate aid programs ==
Graduate students who have been accepted into a graduate program as degree-seeking students are eligible to apply for graduate assistantships to work as research or teaching assistants. SIUE also has number of fellowship, grant, and award programs available to its graduate students.

== University research ==
SIUE's Graduate Studies and Research ranks within the top 10 percent of its peer institutions in the U.S. receiving federal funding for research and development. In FY 2011 the SIUE faculty and staff were awarded over $34 million from external federal and private agencies.

The Office of Research and Projects supports the SIUE research community by providing information and assistance regarding research opportunities, proposal development, project administration, technology transfer, and other services to the University's researchers and scholars. SIUE's research includes cutting-edge projects carried out by the Illinois Education Research Council; the Institute for Urban Research; the National Corn-to-Ethanol Research Center; and the Center for STEM Research, Education, and Outreach. SIUE researchers are also responsible for developing innovative community outreach initiatives through and for the East St. Louis Center.
