= SIUE School of Education, Health and Human Behavior =

Coordinates: 38°47′42″N 89°59′46″W

- Type: Public
- Dean: Paul Rose (Interim)
- Location: Edwardsville, Illinois, U.S.
- Website: www.siue.edu/education

Southern Illinois University Edwardsville's School of Education, Health and Human Behavior is an academic unit of Southern Illinois University Edwardsville located in Edwardsville, Illinois, in the St. Louis metropolitan area of the United States of America.

== History ==
Prior to the development of the Edwardsville campus. the school was established as one of six "Divisions of Academic Programs" for the Residential Centers in Alton and East St. Louis.

When the move was made to the new campus in 1965, these "Divisions" became the Schools of Business, Education, Fine Arts, Humanities, Science and Technology, and Social Sciences.

The name of the school was changed to the School of Education, Health and Human Behavior on July 1, 2014 to reflect its wider range of academics and research.

== Overview ==
The SIUE School of Education, Health and Human Behavior consists of the Departments of Applied Health, Educational Leadership, Psychology, and Teaching and Learning.

The school supports a number of community outreach activities, including the Attention and Behavior Clinic, the Teaching and Learning Curriculum Center, the SIUE East St. Louis Charter High School, the Southern Illinois Professional Development Center, and the Speech-Language-Hearing Center.

The school is also involved in a variety of other projects, often jointly with other institutions.

== Academics ==
The School of Education, Health and Human Behavior offers 9 baccalaureate degrees, and more than 15 graduate degrees. Among its graduate programs, it offers an Ed.D. in educational leadership.

== Faculty ==
In the Fall of 2018, the SIUE School of Education, Health and Human Behavior had 74 tenure-line faculty members, 15 non-tenure-track, full-time instructors, and several part-time lecturers.

== Facilities ==
The offices of the school and its departments are in Alumni Hall, Founders Hall, and the Vadalabene Center.

The SIUE School of Education, Health and Human Behavior partners with school districts and healthcare agencies throughout the St. Louis metropolitan area.

== Accreditation ==
SIUE School of Education, Health and Human Behavior programs are accredited by the National Council for the Accreditation of Teacher Education, the Commission on Accreditation of Allied Health Education Programs, the National Association of School Psychologists, the Council on Academic Accreditation in Audiology and Speech-Language Pathology, and the Council on Education for Public Health, as applicable. Its educator-preparation programs are also approved by the Illinois State Board of Education.
