= SIUE School of Engineering =

Unit of Southern Illinois University Edwardsville

Coordinates: 38°47′31″N 90°00′04″W

- Type: Public
- Dean: Liang Cheng
- Location: Edwardsville, Illinois, U.S.
- Website: www.siue.edu/engineering

Southern Illinois University Edwardsville School of Engineering is an academic unit of Southern Illinois University Edwardsville located in Edwardsville, Illinois, United States. The school enrolls more than 1,450 undergraduates and over 250 graduate students.

== History ==
Prior to the development of the SIU Edwardsville campus, six "Divisions of Academic Programs" were established for the Residential Centers in Alton and East St. Louis. When the move was made to the new campus in 1965, these "Divisions" became the Schools of Business, Education, Fine Arts, Humanities, Science and Technology, and Social Sciences.

The current School of Engineering originated as the Engineering Department of the School of Science and Technology. The department was elevated to School status in 1982.

== Overview ==
The SIUE School of Engineering consists of the Departments of Civil Engineering, Computer Science, Construction, Electrical and Computer Engineering, Industrial and Manufacturing Engineering, and Mechanical Engineering.

The School of Engineering also administers the Environmental Resources Training Center (ERTC) on campus and Southwest Illinois Advanced Manufacturing Center (SIAM) in Edwardsville. The National Corn to Ethanol Research Center (NCERC) is housed in the campus' University Park business and research complex.

== Academics ==
The SIUE School of Engineering offers 11 baccalaureate degrees (10 BS, 1 BA) and 5 master's degrees.

The school also offers a cooperative Ph.D. in Engineering Science and a cooperative Ph.D. in Computer Science with SIU Carbondale.

For continuing education, the Construction Leadership Institute was jointly developed by the SIUE School of Engineering's Department of Construction and the SIUE School of Business as a continuously updated program that allows participants the opportunity to become a part of a network of contractors, subcontractors, business owners, and industry experts in order to develop competencies for leadership, planning, and management.

== Faculty ==
The SIUE School of Engineering has more than fifty faculty members, most of whom hold professorial rank.

== Facilities ==
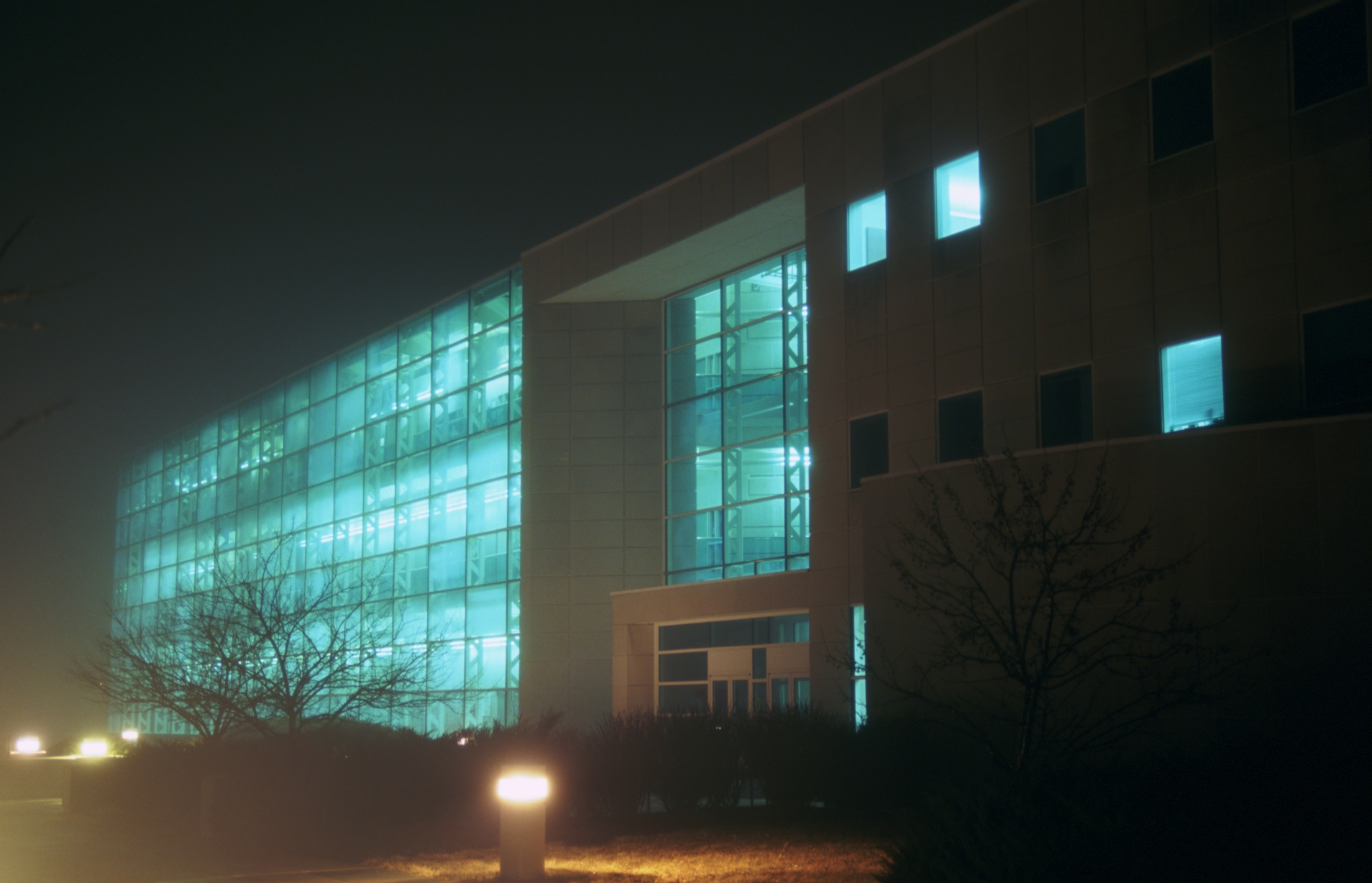
The Engineering Building as seen at night.

=== School of Engineering Building ===
The 129,000-square-foot (12,000 m^{2}) School of Engineering Building opened in the Fall of 2000. The building houses classrooms, instructional and research laboratories, an auditorium, and the offices of the school and its departments. It features a three-story atrium with crossing walkways and exposed structural and utility elements that serve as an open laboratory for design and construction students. Facilities such as the computer integrated manufacturing lab, the dynamic strength testing lab, and the aerodynamic testing lab help to expand the school's research capabilities. The rooftop green roof project is a part of the University’s Green Roof Environmental Evaluation Network (GREEN).

Between the Spring of 2012 and the Summer of 2013, a new building with more than 32,000 square feet (3,000 m^{2}) of offices, classrooms, and research space was built and connected to the existing building by an enclosed bridge. Upon conclusion of the addition, some facilities were moved from their previous spaces, which were then renovated. Work was scheduled to be accomplished at a total cost of $14.2 million.

=== Environmental Resources Training Center ===
Since 1977, the Environmental Resources Training Center (ERTC) has been designated by the Illinois Environmental Protection Agency (IEPA) as the State of Illinois' center for the continuing education of personnel involved in the operation, maintenance and management of drinking water and wastewater treatment systems. It is also the state's site for training Illinois licensed plumbers and certified water operators to become IEPA certified Cross-Connection Control Device Inspectors. The ERTC contains offices, classrooms, and laboratories as well as the 20,000 U.S. gallons (76,000 L) per day training scale clean water and waste water treatment facilities. The ERTC recently installed 144 solar panels and a 120 feet (37 m) wind turbine generator for demonstrating the use of environmentally friendly alternative energy sources in the water treatment industry.

=== National Corn to Ethanol Research Center ===
Located in the SIUE campus' University Park, the National Corn-to-Ethanol Research Center (NCERC) is the world's only facility dedicated to researching the ways and means of converting corn (maize) to ethanol. Using emerging technologies, the NCERC contains an analytical lab, a fermentation lab, and a pilot-scale production plant for performing research and training future workers.

== Accreditation ==
The Civil Engineering, Computer Engineering, Electrical Engineering, Industrial Engineering, Mechanical Engineering and Mechatronics and Robotics Engineering programs are accredited by the Engineering Accrediting Commission of the American Board for Engineering and Technology (ABET). The Computer Science Program is accredited by the Computing Accreditation Commission of ABET. The Construction Management program is accredited by the American Council for Construction Education (ACCE).
