= James T. Minor =

American sociologist and academic administrator

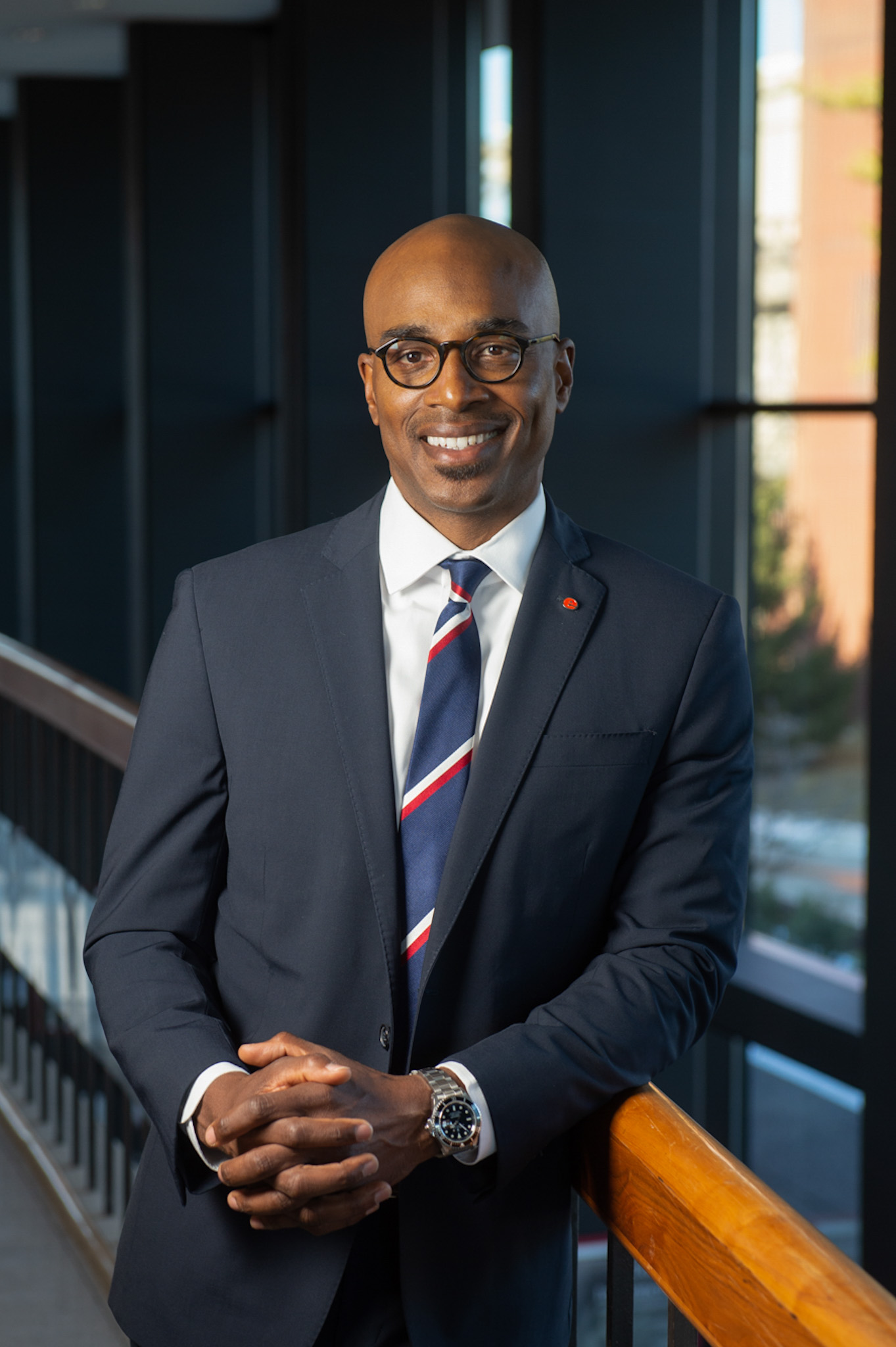
- Minor in 2022

10th Chancellor of Southern Illinois University Edwardsville
- Incumbent
- Assumed office March 1, 2022
- Preceded by: Randall Pembrook

Deputy Assistant Secretary in the Office of Postsecondary Education in the U.S. Department of Education
- In office 2014–2016
- President: Barack Obama

Personal details
- Born: Detroit, Michigan
- Occupations: Sociologist; Academic Administrator
- Years active: 2004–present

Academic background
- Education: Jackson State University (BA); University of Nebraska–Lincoln (MA); University of Wisconsin-Madison (PhD)
- Thesis: Making sense of success: Leadership attributes and practices of successful university presidents (2001)
- Doctoral advisor: Clifton F. Conrad

Academic work
- Discipline: Education and Sociology
- Institutions: Michigan State University; Southern Education Foundation; United States Department of Education; California State University; Southern Illinois University Edwardsville

James T. Minor is an American academic administrator and sociologist who has served as the Chancellor of Southern Illinois University Edwardsville since March 1, 2022.

== Academic background ==
Minor's academic background is in sociology with an emphasis in educational leadership and policy analysis. Minor was born in Detroit, Michigan and graduated from Edwin Denby High School. He began his college career at Jackson State University in Jackson, Mississippi, where he received his BA in sociology in 1996. He earned his MA in sociology from the University of Nebraska–Lincoln. In 2001, and earned his PhD in Educational Leadership and Policy Analysis with a concentration in Higher Education at University of Wisconsin-Madison. After earning his PhD, Minor completed a post-doctoral appointment at the Pullias Center for the Higher Education at the University of Southern California conducting research on academic governance and post-secondary performance.

== Career ==
Minor served as an assistant professor and a tenured associate professor at Michigan State University from 2004 to 2010. He then served as the Director of Higher Education Programs at the Southern Education Foundation from 2010 to 2014.

In 2014, Minor was appointed by the Obama Administration as the Deputy Assistant Secretary in the Office of Postsecondary Education in the U.S. Department of Education, initially under Secretary Arne Duncan, then under Secretary John King Jr until 2016.

In 2016, Minor became Assistant Vice Chancellor and Senior Strategist of the 23-campus California State University (CSU) system, the largest four-year public university system in the United States. Minor was appointed to provide leadership for the system's signature initiative Graduation Initiative 2025, aimed at improving degree completion rates for underrepresented students, facilitating faculty innovation and implementing major system-wide policy reform. In 2018, the CSU reported that graduation rates reached all-time high and the lowest rate of equity gaps among minority and underrepresented students.

In 2021, Minor was chosen as the 10th Chancellor of Southern Illinois University Edwardsville, and he assumed that role in 2022.
