= Bruce Moon =

American art therapist (born c. 1951)

Bruce L. Moon (born c. 1951) is an American singer-songwriter, art therapist, educator, artist, and author. He has recorded 39 albums. He is an Honorary Life Member (HLM) of the American Art Therapy Association (AATA), the most prestigious honor given by the AATA.

== Education ==
Bruce Moon attended high school in Sidney, Ohio. In June 1973, he received a Bachelor of Science degree in art education from Wright State University in Dayton, Ohio, where he first learned about the field of art therapy. He then worked at Harding Hospital in Worthington, Ohio, where he earned an AATA-approved Certificate of Clinical Internship in their Art Therapy Master's Equivalency program in March 1975. He attended Methodist Theological School in Delaware, Ohio, where he received a Master of Arts in Education in June 1976, and a Master of Divinity in June 1982. His formal education culminated in November 1997 with a PhD in creative arts with a specialization in art therapy from the Union Institute in Cincinnati, Ohio.

== Work ==
Prior to his current work as a singer-songwriter, Bruce Moon was the chair of the art therapy department and director of the graduate art therapy program at Mount Mary University in Milwaukee, Wisconsin from 2001 to 2017. He is now professor emeritus of art therapy there. Before that position, he was assistant professor and the director of the graduate art therapy program at Marywood University in Scranton, Pennsylvania from 1996 to 2001. He was also co-director of the graduate clinical art therapy program at Harding Hospital in Worthington, Ohio from 1988 until 1996, which was an affiliate of Lesley University in Cambridge, Massachusetts, where he was also an adjunct faculty member and affiliation coordinator.

Bruce Moon was a licensed professional counselor in Illinois, and a registered and board certified art therapist (ATR-BC). He performed art therapy services pro bono at the Alternative Behavioral Treatment Center in Mundelein, Illinois from 2005 to 2013. During that time Moon worked primarily with clients that were particularly resistant to engage in therapy. Moon also led a group for adolescent males who had committed a sexual offense. He ran a private practice in Worthington, Ohio from 1989 until 1996, providing individual art therapy services for children, adolescents, and adults. From 1986 until 1992, he was the Chief of Adjunctive Therapy of Harding Hospital's Child and Adolescent Division. He also worked as an arts specialist from 1973 to 1975 at the Worthington Community Counseling Service.

== Works ==
Moon has written a number of books and articles, and given over 200 presentations in the US, Canada, Hong Kong and Taiwan. He continues to do research, write music and perform, and make artwork.

In his book Art-Based Group Therapy and Practice, Moon (2010) describes the therapeutic qualities that are presented in art-based group therapy, and suggests that there are 12 essentials. Of these, some very important and striking benefits of art-based group therapy include: “Making art in the presence of others reduces isolation and creates a sense of community”, and “making art in a group setting promotes positive regard for the other members of the group” (p. 4).

In an article written by Moon titled The Tears Make Me Paint: The Role of Responsive Art-making in Adolescent Art Therapy (1999), Moon argues the importance of not only art-making in the adolescents, but response work made by the therapist is an exceptionally helpful tool as well. He listed three ways in which responses to adolescent artwork could be beneficial: (1) as a way to form empathic relationships with the clients; (2) as a release of emotions the therapist may be feeling or struggling with while working with the adolescent population that could possibly counter transfer within a session; and (3) as a catalyst for conversation with the adolescent client (Moon, 1999, p. 79). One of Moon's primary contributions to the profession is his writings related to responsive art making.

=== Artwork ===
Bruce Moon believes art making is a spiritual and sacred act; art is soul, and creating art allows one to participate in sou-makingl. He regards creative expression as the best form of communication between the internal and external worlds. According to Moon, making art serves an existential purpose and can help people overcome feelings of emptiness and hopelessness. In art therapy sessions Moon focuses more on the processes involved and responding to the artwork, more than the product itself. He responds to artwork with conversation, bodily gestures, sound, spontaneous performance, and painting. Moon is very open about his philosophy concerning art therapy and how it offers a unique view into the worldview of an individual’s soul, and thus offering an alternative channel of expression when words do not seem to be enough.

Bruce Moon's medium of choice is painting. He pursues other modes of creative expression including performance art and poetry. He is a singer/songwriter, has recorded several albums, and regularly performs at small concert venues. "Bobby Wouldn't Speak" is a song Moon has recorded, and posted to YouTube, describing an adolescent boy with whom he worked who was the victim of abuse. Some other songs are "Love Called Him Like a River," "Roads Desire," "She'd like to be a Ballerina," and "Antoine's Got a Razor in his Heart." These are all songs about clients with whom Moon has worked and his way of conveying their stories. He is the co-editor of the book Word Pictures: The Poetry and Art of Art Therapists (2004), which is a unique collection of artwork, poems, and essays by art therapists and art therapy students.

He has been playing guitar and writing music since the mid 1960s. In the early 70s he supported himself through college by playing as half of a duo, B.T. Noah at coffeehouses and small concerts in Ohio and Indiana. In the 80s he was part of another duo, Laughter and Hard Times that played in bars, restaurants and festivals in and around Columbus, Ohio. For the last 20 years he has performed solo in a number of settings, including WVIA public radio in Scranton, PA, a street festival in Savannah, Georgia, a coffeehouse in Seattle, and a hall on the Riverwalk in San Antonio. Since his reimagining in 2017, he has been dedicated to writing, performing solo and with his bands, The Others, and The Amplifiers, and building community through music. He has recorded 39 albums that are widely available on streaming services.

Moon has also displayed his artwork in exhibits across the country.

=== Presentations ===
In the fall of 2012, Moon presented with his wife, Catherine Moon, as keynote speakers at the Canadian Art Therapy Association national conference. Their presentation was called Collaboration and Connection: A Call to Art and held a workshop as well, called Art Therapy Couture: Presenting Our Best Professional Selves. During the summer of 2012, he spent time in Hong Kong and Taiwan where he was the keynote speaker at conferences at Hong Kong University and the Taipei Municipal Educators College in Taiwan.

=== Books ===
- Artist, Therapist, Teacher: Selected Writings (2014)
- Art-Based Group Therapy and Practice (2010)
- Existential Art Therapy: The Canvas Mirror (3rd ed., 2008)
- Introduction to Art Therapy: Faith in the Product (2nd ed., 2008)
- The Role of Metaphor in Art Therapy: Theory, Method, and Experience (2007)
- Ethical Issues in Art Therapy (3rd ed., 2015)
- Art and Soul: Reflections on an Artistic Psychology (2nd ed., 2004)
- Word Pictures: The Poetry and Art of Art Therapists (co-editor, 2004)
- Essentials of Art Therapy Education and Practice (2nd ed., 2003)
- Working with Images: The Art of Art Therapists (2002)
- Moon, B. L, A.-B. (1999). The Tears Make Me Paint: The role of Responsive Artmaking in Adolescent Art Therapy. Art Therapy: Journal of the American Art Therapy Association, 16:2, 78–82
- The Dynamics of Art as Therapy with Adolescents (1998)

Albums

Shine On Me (2022), I'll Give You That (2022), No Turning Back (2022), Long Road (2022), Laughter and Hard Times (2022), Seeing Double (2022), Howl At the Moon (2023), Four Lives: Welcome to the Studio (2023), Voices From Nowhere (2023), Truths (2023), With Any Luck (2023), The River Road (2023), It'll Be Alright (2023), Don't Come Back (2023), The Brave and the Bold (2023), Yes Again (2023), Some Deep Empty (2023), Rearview Mirror (2023), Live at Bishop Hill (2023), Underground Cult Hero Plays Dive Bar in Pensacola (2023), Was (2023), Live From Bishop Hill (2024), Lost and Found (2024), Hometown Stories and Songs (2024), Further, Farther, Above and Beyond (2024), Roadside Cafe (2024), Bodies, Ghosts and Memories (2024), Return to Bishop Hill (2024), Live As I Need to Be (2025), Dissidents (2025), Unforetold (2025), Invisible Strings (2025), Enough (2026), Are You Good Enough (2026), Crack in the Wall (2026), Malcontents and Mutineers (2027), Old Friends: Featuring John S. Reece (2026). Ricochet (2026).
