= J. Kevin Dorsey =

American academic administrator and physician

Interim President of Southern Illinois University
- In office August 1, 2018 – 2019
- Preceded by: Randy Dunn
- Succeeded by: Daniel F. Mahony

Dean of the Southern Illinois University School of Medicine
- In office August 16, 2002 – July 16, 2018
- Preceded by: Carl J. Getto
- Succeeded by: Jerry E. Kruse

Personal details
- Born: February 7, 1943 (age 83) New York, New York
- Education: Fairfield University (BS); University of Wisconsin–Madison (PhD); Southern Illinois University (MD)
- Profession: Rheumatologist

J. Kevin Dorsey is an American academic administrator and physician who served as interim president of the Southern Illinois University from 2018 to 2019. He previously served as dean and provost of the Southern Illinois University School of Medicine from 2001 to 2015 and later became dean and provost emeritus. Dorsey is also a professor of internal medicine and medical education and has held multiple leadership and teaching roles at the institution since joining the faculty in 1973.

== Education ==
Dorsey earned his bachelor's degree at Fairfield University in 1964, and his doctoral degree in physiological chemistry at University of Wisconsin–Madison in 1968. He was a postdoctoral fellow in biology at Johns Hopkins University from 1970 to 1973. After earning his medical degree at Southern Illinois University in 1978, he completed his internal medicine residency and a two-year fellowship in rheumatology at the University of Iowa in Iowa City in 1981 and 1983.

== Career ==
Dorsey joined the Southern Illinois University at Carbondale faculty as assistant professor of chemistry and biochemistry in 1973 and then returned to earn his medical degree at Southern Illinois University in 1978. After additional training, he rejoined the faculty in 1983 when he was named an assistant professor and coordinated clinical teaching activities for first-year medical students. In 1998, Dorsey was named as associate provost for the southern region in Carbondale. For 15 years, he also was a rheumatologist with The Carbondale Clinic. The board of trustees at Southern Illinois University appointed Dorsey dean and provost of the School of Medicine on August 16, 2002. He was appointed interim president of the Southern Illinois University system on July 16, 2018.

== Awards ==
In 1993, Dorsey was the first Southern Illinois University School of Medicine graduate to be named a Distinguished Alumnus. Dorsey was awarded a John Templeton Spirituality in Medicine Curricular Award in 2000.
