= Southern Illinois University Edwardsville =

Public university in Edwardsville, Illinois, US

Coordinates: 38°47′36″N 90°00′00″W

- Type: Public university
- Established: 1957; 69 years ago
- Accreditation: HLC
- Endowment: $45.1 million (2025)
- Chancellor: James T. Minor
- President: Daniel F. Mahony
- Students: 12,813 (fall 2025)
- Undergraduates: 9,925 (fall 2025)
- Postgraduates: 2,098 (fall 2025)
- Doctoral students: 790 (fall 2025)
- Location: Edwardsville, Illinois, United States
- Campus: Suburban, 2,660 acres (1,076.5 ha)
- Colors: Red and white
- Nickname: Cougars
- Sporting affiliations: NCAA Division I – Ohio Valley Conference
- Mascot: Eddie the Cougar #57
- Website: siue.edu

Southern Illinois University Edwardsville (SIUE) is a public university in Edwardsville, Illinois, United States. Located within the Metro East of Greater St. Louis, SIUE was established in 1957 as an extension of Southern Illinois University Carbondale. It is the younger of the two major institutions of the Southern Illinois University system. SIUE has eight constituent undergraduate and graduate colleges, including those in arts and sciences, business, dentistry, education, engineering, graduate study, nursing, and pharmacy. In addition to its main campus it also hosts the East St. Louis Center.

While most of SIUE's students are from Illinois, out-of-state and international students account for 19% of enrollment. SIUE offers in-state tuition for undergraduate students from all 50 states. The university offers numerous extracurricular activities to its students, including athletics, honor societies, student clubs and organizations, as well as fraternities and sororities. The university has more than 115,000 alumni.

Fielding athletic teams known as the SIU Edwardsville Cougars, the university participates in the National Collegiate Athletic Association (NCAA) at the Division I level as a member of the Ohio Valley Conference (OVC).

== History ==
During the post–World War II economic expansion, a lack of public higher education was noticeable in the growing Metro-East area. Organizations from across the area took it upon themselves to relieve this lack. Southern Illinois University (SIU), over 100 miles (160 km) to the region's south, opened a residence center in Belleville in 1949. In 1955, the Edwardsville Chamber of Commerce founded the Southwestern Illinois Council for Higher Education (SWICHE), tasked with creating a more permanent solution to the problem. SWICHE and SIU's board of trustees met and stated their agreement in goals in 1956, and, that same year, an executive committee from the Board of Education in Alton invited Alonzo Myers, Chairman of the Department of Higher Education for Higher Education at New York University, to perform a study of the need for higher education in the Metro-East.

Myers's 1957 report, The Extent and the Nature of Needs for Higher Education in Madison and St. Clair Counties, outlined the precise need: the 1950 census showed that students in the region in question were only half as likely as those in other regions of the country to finish a four-year college degree program (owing specifically to the lack of a nearby university and the financial difficulties of going to school away from home at other state universities). Businesses in the area were in need of college-trained employees, but were forced to hire outside of the area, especially in the fields of business administration, nursing, education, and industrial technology. Myers concluded that, rather than more residence centers, private schools, or junior colleges, a branch of a four-year public university would best serve the needs of the area. He recommended SIU, the closest large public university, as the best candidate.

Acting on the report, in 1957, SIU purchased both a former building of East St. Louis High School and the campus of Shurtleff College in Alton as temporary facilities. Even with all of the research and planning that had gone before, the true need had been underestimated. When the new campuses opened, officials planned on having about 800 students; 1776 enrolled, and enrollment doubled within two years.

The dual campus solution was temporary, mostly because both facilities were in urban areas with little room for expansion even at the time of purchase. Land for the permanent campus was purchased in 1960—2,660-acre (1,076.5 ha) of farmland. Money for the purchase came from A) contributions from individuals, businesses, industries, labor unions, civic organizations, and PTAs; B) loans from 14 Metro-East banks; and C) state funding. The location, west of Edwardsville, was chosen due to its accessibility via highways, its usability as an educational campus, and its proximity to the major urban areas of the Metro-East.

In 1960, a bond issue was voted upon by the residents of Illinois; the measure passed by more than 100,000 votes, providing funds for the construction of the campuses of SIUE and the school now known as the University of Illinois Chicago. A conference entitled Environmental Planning-Edwardsville Campus (EPEC) took place in 1961, highlighting the architectural and spatial design of the future campus. The campus was designed by architects Hellmuth, Obata and Kassabaum. Ground was broken in 1963 and, with the first two buildings (Peck Hall and Lovejoy Library) completed, classes were first held on the Edwardsville campus in fall 1965. A series of dedication ceremonies from 1966 to 1969 highlighted the ongoing growth of the campus.

Prior to the development of the Edwardsville campus, six "Divisions of Academic Programs" were established for the SIU Residential Centers in Alton and East St. Louis on March 4, 1960. When the move was made to the new campus in 1965, the "Divisions" became the Schools of Business, Education, Fine Arts, Humanities, Science and Technology, and Social Sciences. The nursing program, which was to become the School of Nursing when the new campus opened, was established on March 29, 1964. On April 18, 1969, the board of trustees voted to establish the School of Dental Medicine, which opened in 1972. The School of Engineering originated as the Engineering Department of the School of Science and Technology and was elevated to School status in 1982. Between September 9, 1993, and July 1, 1995, the Schools of Fine Arts, Humanities, Sciences, and Social Sciences and the University College merged to become the College of Arts and Sciences. The newest of SIUE's schools, the School of Pharmacy, began classes in 2005. In 2014, the School of Education was renamed to School of Education, Health and Human Behavior to better represent the diversity and growth of its academic programs.

During its early days of rapid growth, the school became increasingly independent of its parent school in Carbondale. In 1971, SIU's board of trustees made official the campus's name of Southern Illinois University at Edwardsville.

=== Mississippi River Festival ===
From 1969 to 1980, the SIUE campus hosted the Mississippi River Festival (MRF), a summer outdoor concert series that featured performances by the St. Louis Symphony Orchestra (which was in-residence on campus during the MRF's early years) and high-profile classical, jazz, folk, pop, and rock artists including the Chicago Symphony Orchestra, Van Cliburn, Aaron Copland, Bob Hope, The Who, Yes, Chicago, Joan Baez, The Eagles, the Modern Jazz Quartet, and The Grateful Dead. The MRF stage was situated beneath a large tent, which also covered the reserved seating section, with lawn seating available outside on the grass of the expansive natural amphitheater. The MRF attracted crowds of up to 30,000.

== Campus ==
=== Main campus ===
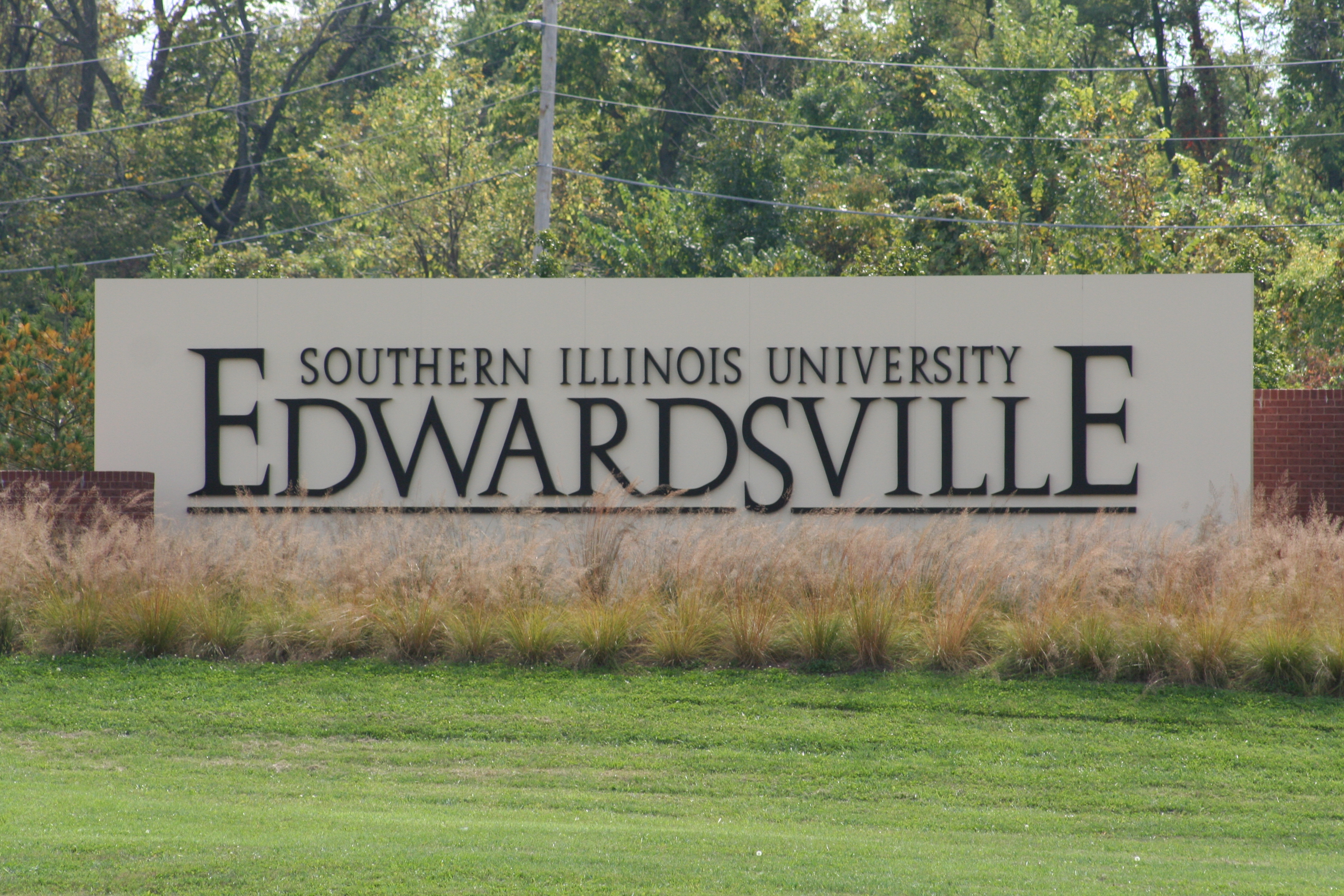
SIUE sign at the entrance to the main campus

Southern Illinois University Edwardsville is located on 2,660 acres (1,076.5 ha) of trees and lakes, making SIUE one of the largest college campuses in the US by land area. The campus is home to a wide variety of university programs and facilities—classroom and labs, arts and theatre spaces, research centers, student housing, and athletic and recreational venues.

The majority of SIUE's academic buildings are located in the Core Campus, inside Circle Drive on the south side of the 77 acres (31.2 ha) Cougar Lake. Many of the academic buildings were constructed during the 1960s, shortly after the land for the campus was purchased, with major additions during the 1970s. Another building boom has occurred since the turn of the 21st century, as the university experienced enrollment growth and expanded programs.

The center of the Core Campus is the Stratton Quadrangle, named after William Stratton, who served as the governor of Illinois from 1953 to 1961 and was the university's first commencement speaker in June 1960. The quadrangle is designed with no direct pathway between two buildings, this provides students with exposure to nature during the commute between buildings. The quadrangle also contains The Rock, which is constantly changing color because student organizations, such as fraternities and sororities, compete to see who can keep it painted their colors the longest. The original Rock, a rose quartz boulder, was donated by the supplier of stone for the original Core Campus buildings. It was stolen during the night of October 7–8, 2003, and was found in pieces nine days later. A replacement Rock of limestone was donated by the Unimin Corporation in 2003, installed on March 14, and dedicated on April 7. The remnants of the original Rock were put on display in the Morris University Center.

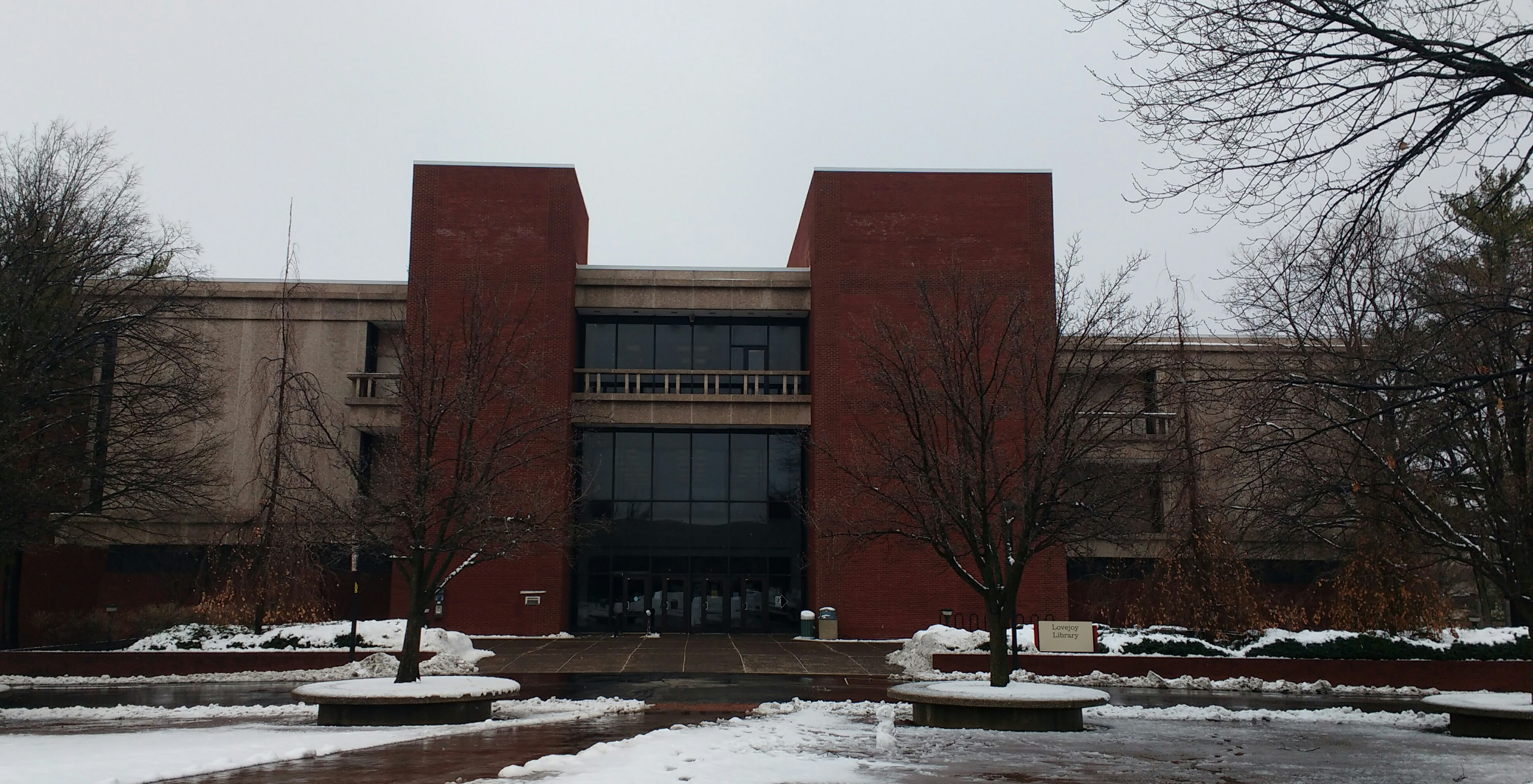
Lovejoy Library

The Lovejoy Library is named after Elijah Parish Lovejoy and sits on the north side of the Stratton Quadrangle. It opened in 1965 and now holds over 800,000 volumes of almost 600,000 titles in book form plus over 1.67 million titles on microfilm across its four floors. Three of the university's major academic buildings lie to the east of Lovejoy Library and northeast of the quadrangle. Peck Hall is named after John Mason Peck and opened in 1965. It houses the College of Arts & Sciences and the Departments of Anthropology, History, Sociology, Social Work, English, Foreign Languages, Political Science, and Philosophy. Alumni Hall opened in 1976 and was originally known as Classroom Building III. It houses classrooms and the offices of the School of Nursing and of the departments of Speech Communication, Art Education, Art Therapy, Geography, and Public Administration and Policy Analysis. Founders Hall was originally known as Classroom Building II and opened the same year as Alumni Hall. Founders contains various classroom spaces and is home to the schools of Business and Education and the Army ROTC program.

The Science Building Complex is located to the west of Lovejoy Library. The Science Lab Building East (originally the Science Building) opened in 1966. Construction of the new Science Lab Building West began in late 2009, as part of a $72 million project to build it and completely renovate the existing building. The new building opened for use in the Fall of 2013, with the renovation of the old building originally slated for completion in the Fall of 2016. Renovation work on Science Building East was halted in 2015 due to the Illinois budget crisis, but SIUE "forward funded" the work on the two large lecture halls, which were already back in use when work resumed. Science Lab Building East was rededicated in September 2018, the completion late but well under budget.

Dunham Hall opened in 1966 and underwent an expansion in 1995. The building is named after Katherine Dunham and houses the Departments of Music, Mass Communications, Theater and Dance, and the Information Technology Services. In addition to departmental offices, the building houses music studios, theater studios and workshops, the student television studio, a multimedia computer lab, video editing lab, photojournalism dark room, and WSIE-FM and web-radio radio stations. There is also a theater seating approximately 400, with a proscenium stage, orchestra pit, theatrical lighting, and special effect trap doors. The building is located south of the Science building and directly west of the quadrangle.

The Morris University Center is named for former SIU president Delyte W. Morris and opened in 1967. The MUC is the heart of student activity and lies on the southern edge of the Stratton Quadrangle. The facility contains dining halls, restaurants, a ballroom, conference rooms, the university bookstore, a bowling center and game room, a Starbucks coffeeshop, the University Bookstore, and other student services, as well as offices for various student organizations and volunteer activities. The Student Success Center is one of the newest facilities on the SIUE campus. It opened in 2009 and is connected to the MUC. Available to students 24 hours a day, the Success Center houses academic and personal support services all in one convenient location, a study lounge and coffee bar, meeting rooms, and a Mac computer lab. The building also contains the offices of student government, disability support services, academic advancement, health services, a career development center, and international programs. The building was constructed using Green building techniques that includes the use of sustainable and recycled construction materials.

Rendleman Hall is located to the east of the University Center and is named after former SIUE president John S. Rendleman. It opened in 1969 and serves as the main administrative building, housing the admission review and processing office, the bursar's office, and the housing office. Rendleman Hall, since 1970, has also been the location of the branch U.S. Post Office for ZIP code 62026, which serves SIUE's campuses in Edwardsville, Alton, and East St. Louis.

Other academic, arts and athletic buildings are located to the west of the campus center. The Theater Department also uses the Metcalf Experimental Theater, a separate building named after James F. Metcalf (father of actress Laurie Metcalf) that opened in 1984 as a replacement for an old Quonset hut that was used for productions. The Engineering Building, opened in 2000 and expanded in 2013–14, houses the SIUE School of Engineering. It includes classrooms, laboratories, and offices for the school and its departments. The Art and Design Building, opened in 1994 and expanded in 2012–13, contains the offices of the Department of Art and Design and its classrooms and studios. The Center for Spirituality & Sustainability, formerly known as the Religious Center was completed in 1971 and is located near the Art and Design Building. It is topped by a plexiglass Geodesic dome which resembles a globe with Edwardsville oriented at the top. The center was designed by R. Buckminster Fuller and internationally known architect, Shoji Sadao, and dedicated by Fuller, who was a visiting professor at SIUE at the time. The 90th Meridian runs through the building.

In celebration of the 2018 Illinois Bicentennial, the Southern Illinois University Edwardsville campus was selected as one of the Illinois 200 Great Places by the American Institute of Architects Illinois component (AIA Illinois).

==== Athletic facilities ====
The Vadalabene Center (also known as the "VC"), named after state senator Sam M. Vadalabene, opened in 1983 and is the focal point for SIUE athletics, containing many of the university's sports facilities. The Vadalabene Center's arena was renamed to First Community Arena at the Vadalabene Center by First Community Credit Union in 2021. The company will pay $2.3 million over the next 10 years for the new name. The center was expanded in 1993 with the addition of the Student Fitness Center, which was improved in 2009. It was further expanded in 2008 as SIUE's athletics began the transition from NCAA Division II to Division I. Among the changes were an increase in the arena seating from 2,400 to over 4,000. All of the athletics department offices are housed in the Lukas Athletics Annex to the VC, which was opened in 2012. The VC is home to not only Intercollegiate Athletics, but also to Campus Recreation and to the Departments of Kinesiology and Health Education of the School of Education. Korte Stadium and its Bob Guelker Field opened in 1994 and serves the men's and women's soccer and track and field teams. Cougar Field, home of the softball team, and its Fulginiti Indoor practice facility (opened 2012) sits just to the northwest of Korte Stadium. The Simmons Baseball Complex is home to the Cougar baseball team and is located on New Poag Road, west of Stadium Drive, in the northwest corner of the campus. The Cougar Tennis Courts are just west of the Vadalabene Center and the SIUE Cross Country Course is on the north edge of the campus at the intersection of North University Drive and New Poag Road.

==== Student housing ====
Housing consists of several residence halls and Cougar Village, which are the university's on-campus apartments. All campus student accommodations are suite-style and furnished. Each contains social lounges and multiple service units such as computer labs and Learning Resource Centers. Student housing surrounds the academic buildings in the central portion of the SIUE campus.

Woodland and Prairie Hall are located on the southern side of campus between Circle Drive and South University Drive. The two serve as freshmen dorms, providing housing for a combined 1,000 students. Woodland Hall opened in 1994 and is the oldest residence hall. It houses 500 freshmen students. The hall is multifunctional and contains conference and meeting rooms. Woodland Hall has a small student café, Woodland Cart, which provides students with food during the week. Freshmen Focused Interest Communities (groups based on common interest or academic majors) are spread out among the three freshmen residence halls. Prairie Hall opened in 1998. It houses 500 freshmen students. Prairie Hall contains meeting rooms and a computer lab, and Freshmen Focused Interest Communities.

Bluff and Evergreen Halls lie to the west of Circle Drive and are the two newest residence halls on the SIUE campus. Bluff Hall opened in 2001 and houses 500 freshmen students. Bluff Hall recently added an Esports Arena into the building. Evergreen Hall is the newest residence hall, opened in 2007, and houses about 500 students. Evergreen is designed for upper-class residents, it features apartment and suite-style living. Students are able to choose from multiple floor plans. The hall also has multiple service facilities, such as fitness center and meeting rooms.

In addition to the traditional, dorm-style residence halls, Cougar Village is a student apartment development that opened in 1970. The complex is located along the eastern shore of Cougar Lake and is composed of around 500 two and three-bedroom apartments in 62 buildings that house approximately 1,500 undergraduate students, graduate students, and family residents. The village was originally called Tower Lake Apartments, after the man-made lake on the north side of campus located behind the water tower and the heating and refrigeration plant. Tower Lake is now called Cougar Lake. Apartments provide multiple floor plans and are a short walk or shuttle ride from the core campus. Cougar Village also includes the Cougar Village Commons Building, located in the middle complex. The Commons contains an information desk, laundry facilities, a lounge, a computer lab, and the Common's Grill and Convenience Store. In 2010, a project was developed and approved to remodel eight of the buildings in Cougar Village into a Greek Village, providing on-campus fraternity and sorority houses, but the project was later dropped.

==== University Park ====
University Park is a 330-acre (133.5 ha) mixed-use technology park located on the eastern side of the SIUE Campus.

The School of Pharmacy Lab houses the SIUE School of Pharmacy and began offering courses to students admitted to the SIUE doctor of Pharmacy program in August 2005. The building is located in SIUE's University Park. The School of Pharmacy also has space in the adjacent 200 University Park Building and in the nearby Technology and Management Center and the Biotechnology Laboratory Incubator, which also contains Biology and Chemistry labs, as well as the Geographic Information Systems offices.

The National Corn-to-Ethanol Research Center (NCERC) is the world's only facility dedicated to researching the ways and means of converting corn (maize) to ethanol.

==== Additional facilities ====
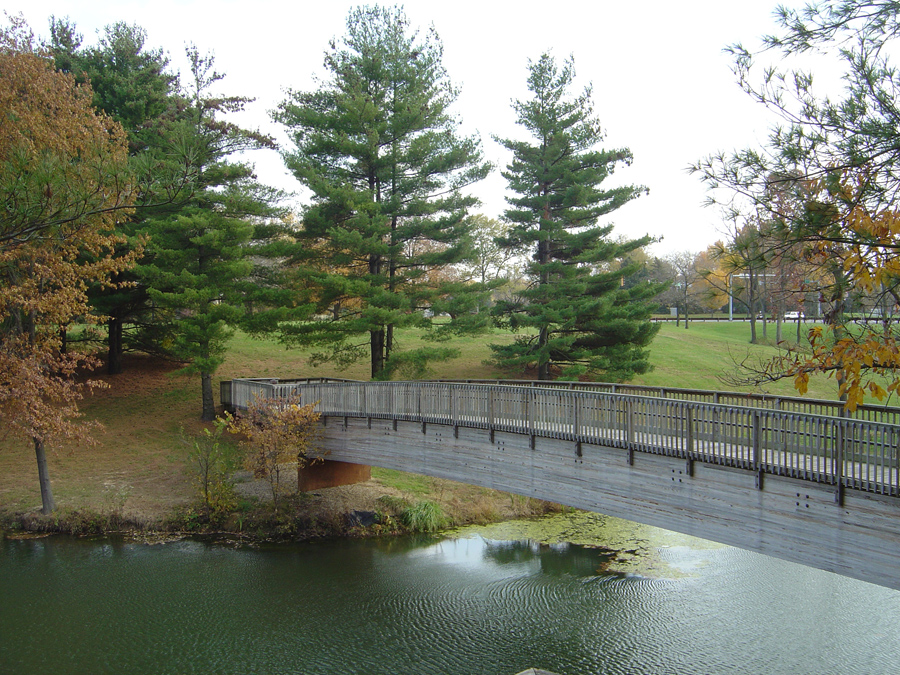
Bridge over Turtle Pond in the Gardens at SIUE, fall 2005

The Environmental Resource Training Center (ERTC) is designated by the Illinois Environmental Protection Agency (IEPA) as the State of Illinois' center for continuing education of personnel involved in the operation, maintenance and management of drinking water and wastewater treatment systems. The ERTC is located on the north side of the campus along New Poag Road and features lab and classroom space, as well as a 30,000 gallon-per-day wastewater treatment and drinking water treatment plant.

The university developed a 35-acre (14.2 ha) botanical garden, known as The Gardens at SIUE, that is also a living laboratory in support of the educational and research missions of the university. The Gardens are located off Cougar Lake Road, near the Cougar Lake Recreation Area and the Cougar Village apartments.

The Southwest Illinois Advanced Manufacturing Center (SIAM) was launched in 2005, performing applied and basic research for product/process development and improvement. The center was funded by the U. S. Department of Commerce Economic Development Administration. The Hoffman Center on the N.O. Nelson Campus of Lewis and Clark Community College in Edwardsville provided over 35,000 sq ft (3,300 m^{2}) of space for SIAM. The center was closed in 2012.

=== Alton Campus ===
SIUE's campus in Alton, Illinois, 17 miles (27 km) from the main campus, the site of SIU's Alton residential center from 1957 to 1965, now houses the School of Dental Medicine and its offices, classrooms, labs, clinics, and ancillary services.

The Alton campus is also home to the Alton Museum of History and Art, located inside Loomis Hall.

=== East St. Louis Center ===
SIUE's East St. Louis Center, located in East St. Louis, Illinois, 22 miles (35 km) from the main campus, traces its beginnings when Southern Illinois University Board of Trustees in response to local people's demands for more education in the Metro East established residence centers in East St. Louis in 1957. The current location is the center's fifth in the city since 1957, but it is the first site specifically designed and built for this purpose. The center provides educational programs, community outreach health services, and cultural events to an economically deprived area of the Metro East. It also provides clinical and practicum experiences relating to urban community needs for various university baccalaureate, professional, and master's programs and for urban studies research.

The ESLC operates in conjunction with the SIUE East St. Louis Charter High School to prepare students for career and college programs. The ESLC includes a Head Start Program providing services to children up to age five, pregnant women, and families; a Latchkey Program to provide local families with after-school care for children ages six to 12; and the SIUE East St. Louis Center Performing Arts Program, established in 1967 (formerly known as the Katherine Dunham Center for the Performing Arts and originally as the Performing Arts Training Center) to provide cultural and performing arts classes and workshops. The center also houses the Community Nursing Services office of the SIUE School of Nursing, the East St. Louis Dental Clinic of the SIUE School of Dental Medicine, an eye care clinic, and the East St. Louis Community College Center.

=== Springfield Campus ===
SIUE also maintains an off-site location in Springfield, Illinois, for graduate nursing students as part of the SIUE School of Nursing. Classes at the Springfield Campus are delivered via live televideo conferencing as well as traditional lectures. The location is near the SIU School of Medicine and works with the School of Medicine to help students engage in interdisciplinary activities.

== Academics ==
The university is classified among "D/PU: Doctoral/Professional Universities". Total enrollment in fall 2015 was 14,265, the largest overall enrollment in the university's history. The new freshman class of 2015 of 2,096, representing the second largest group of new freshmen in SIUE's history. The average ACT Score for SIUE's fall 2015 freshman class was 23.2; the national average freshman ACT score is 20.9. There are more than 91,000 living alumni. The student body in the fall of 2013 came from all 102 Illinois counties, 38 states, and 43 foreign nations. The international student population exceeds 300. The top five countries represented on campus are India, Turkey, Iran, China, and Nigeria.

SIUE offers 65 baccalaureate degrees, eight post-baccalaureate certificate, 49 master's degrees, 12 post-master's or specialist certificates, and doctoral degrees in Dental Medicine, Pharmacy, Educational Leadership, and Nursing Practice. The university also offer three cooperative Doctor of Philosophy degrees in education, engineering, and history in conjunction with SIUC. Additionally, the Office of Educational Outreach provides and coordinates continuing education programs offered by several academic departments.

SIUE confers degrees from eight colleges and schools, while Lovejoy Library also has status as a school that does not grant degrees:

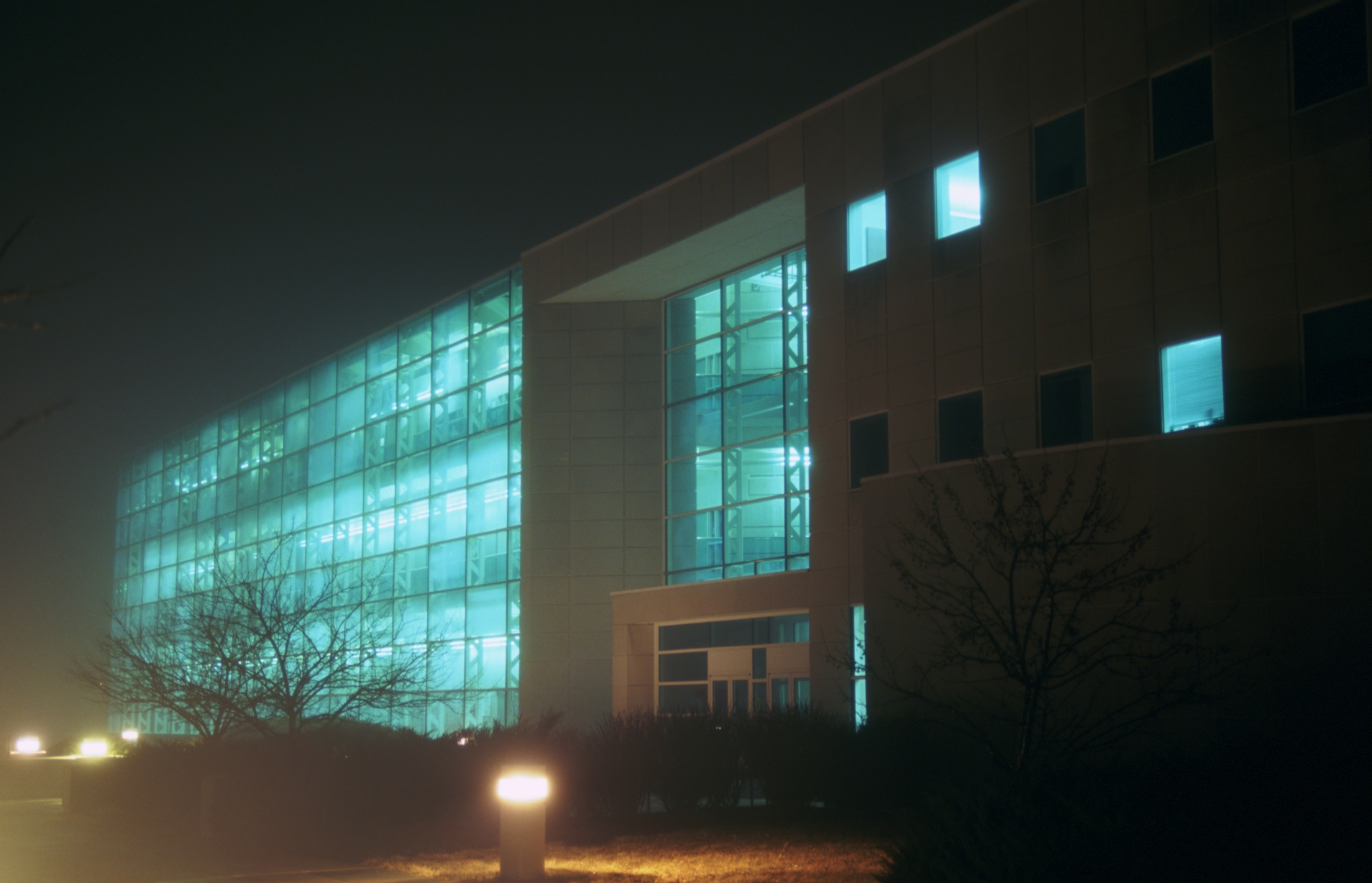
The Engineering Building as seen at night

- College of Arts and Sciences
- School of Business
- School of Dental Medicine
- School of Education, Health and Human Behavior
- School of Engineering
- Lovejoy Library
- School of Nursing
- School of Pharmacy
- Graduate School

In fiscal year 2016, SIUE faculty and staff received 162 grants and contracts for research, teaching, and service initiatives worth more than $24 million—which ranked second among more than 680 comparable public and private universities in the country. The grants awarded were from agencies that included the National Science Foundation, the National Institutes of Health, the National Endowment for the Humanities, the National Endowment for the Arts, the Environmental Protection Agency, the U.S. Departments of Education and Health and Human Services, and the National Aeronautics and Space Administration.

=== Accreditation ===
SIUE has had full accreditation from the Higher Learning Commission (HLC) of the North Central Association of Colleges and Schools since 1969.

The SIUE School of Business and its Department of Accounting are accredited by the Association to Advance Collegiate Schools of Business (AACSB). All of the SIUE School of Education programs are fully accredited by the National Council for the Accreditation of Teacher Education as well as by the Illinois State Board of Education, and its Early Childhood Education Program is accredited by the National Academy of Early Childhood Programs. In the SIUE School of Engineering, the Civil Engineering, Computer Engineering, Electrical Engineering, Industrial Engineering, Manufacturing Engineering, and Mechanical Engineering programs are accredited by the Engineering Accrediting Commission of the American Board for Engineering and Technology (ABET); the Computer Science Program is accredited by the Computing Accreditation Commission of ABET; and the Construction Management program is accredited by the American Council for Construction Education (ACCE). The SIUE School of Nursing is fully accredited by the Commission on Collegiate Nursing Education (CCNE) for a period of ten years; additionally, the Certified Nurse Anesthesia Program is fully accredited for a ten-year period by the Council on Accreditation of Nurse Anesthesia Programs. The SIU School of Dental Medicine is fully accredited by the Commission on Dental Accreditation of the American Dental Association (ADA), and the Endodontic Residency and Periodontics Residency programs offered in cooperation with St. Louis University are also accredited by the Commission on Dental Accreditation of the ADA. In the spring of 2009, the SIUE School of Pharmacy, the university's newest school, received full accreditation status from the Accreditation Council for Pharmacy Education (ACPE).

Departments within the SIUE College of Arts Sciences university are accredited or certified by: the Accrediting Council on Education in Journalism and Mass Communications, the American Speech-Language-Hearing Association, the Council on Social Work Education, the National Association of Schools of Music, the National Association of Schools of Public Affairs and Administration, and the National Association of Schools of Theatre, as appropriate. In addition, the American Art Therapy Association and the American Chemical Society have formally reviewed and approved SIUE's programs as meeting their standards.

=== Rankings ===
Academic rankings

Master's
- Washington Monthly: 99 (USA)

Regional
- U.S. News & World Report: 72 (in the Midwest)

National
- Forbes: 554

U.S. News & World Report Best Colleges 2019 edition dropped SIUE 25 places from 2014 so that SIUE became tied for number 72 in the "Best Regional Universities-Midwest" category. Back in the 2014 edition, U.S. News & World Report Best Colleges had placed SIUE at number 47, and at that time placed it among the top 10 public universities, both in the "Best Regional Universities-Midwest" category. Plus, back then in 2014, SIUE was tied with Butler University at No. 3 of the "Up-and-Coming Schools (Midwest)".

Washington Monthly, a national political magazine, in its "2018 College Guide and Rankings" ranked SIUE at number 99 among private and public colleges and universities in the nation that are classified as "Masters Universities" with the rankings based on contributions to the public good. Previously, in 2014, Washington Monthly had ranked SIUE 40th in its "Masters Universities" category, the 2018 ranking dropping SIUE 59 places.

The National Council for Home Safety and Security's 2018 listing of the Safest College Campuses in the U.S. placed SIUE 11th among schools with an enrollment over 10,000; this placed the school No. 1 in Illinois and ranked ahead of all institutions in Missouri. The online news magazine The Daily Beast ranks SIUE 21st in the nation among its 2010 Top 50 Safest Colleges: University Primetime News ranked it as the ninth safest. These ratings led to feature stories on SIUE's safety. SIUE police officers are academy trained and engaged in a community policing program.

SIUE students' commitment to community service through volunteer efforts earned them a spot on the 2009 and 2010 President's Higher Education Community Service Honor Roll of the Corporation for National and Community Service, an honor given to only six US colleges and universities each year.

SIUE's School of Business was ranked as a "Best 310 Business School" in the 2010 edition of the Princeton Review. In The Princeton Review's 2012 rankings, SIUE's business school was ranked in the top 294. In 2006, SIUE's Department of Psychology won a national award from the Council for Higher Education Accreditation. In 2014, the same department won a departmental service award from the American Psychological Association.

== Athletics ==
SIUE Athletics wordmark

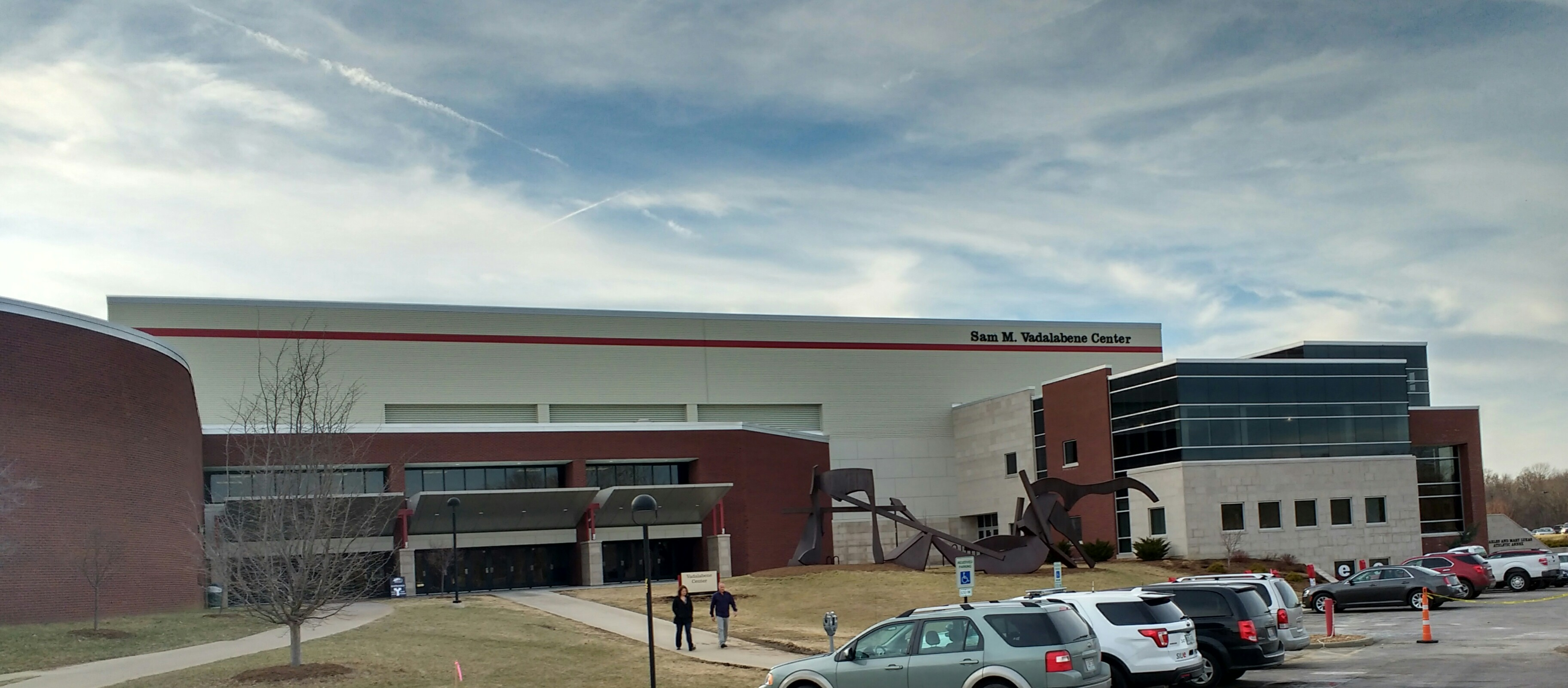
Vadalebene Center

Cougar mascots
SIUE once housed two live cougar mascots. From 1968 to 1985, the female cougar, Chimega (an Apache word for cougar), was the official mascot. On March 18, 1985, Chimaga died of old age. In July 1982, Kyna became the second official mascot of SIUE. After only five years at SIUE, Kyna was sent to a wildlife preserve in Southern Illinois near Metropolis. SIUE no longer houses live mascots.

The SIUE athletic teams are nicknamed the Cougars. SIUE is a member of the NCAA at the Division I level. The university is a member in the Ohio Valley Conference (OVC) and most teams compete in the OVC. However, the university also fields certain sports that the OVC does not sponsor competition in; SIUE is an associate member of the Mid-American Conference for wrestling. Previously, they were an associate member of the Missouri Valley Conference for men's soccer and an associate member of the Southern Conference for wrestling from 2007 to 2017. Until 2008, SIUE competed in the NCAA's Division II as a member of the Great Lakes Valley Conference (GLVC). The university has won 17 NCAA National Championships, 16 of which occurred while the university was a member of Division II.

The school mascot was Cory the Cougar until 2010, when the school decided to get a new mascot, "Eddie the Cougar"—the new name being a direct reference to Edwardsville. The number 57 on Eddie's jersey is in honor of the university's founding in 1957.

== Student life ==
=== Student clubs and activities ===
Numerous extracurricular activities are available to students, including nearly 150 registered student organizations, Greek organizations, and sports clubs.

Many of the student activities are overseen by the staff of the Kimmel Belonging and Engagement Hub which also offers students the opportunities to engage in community volunteer programs. Among these programs, students can take part in the Student Leadership Development Program, which consists of 60 hours of volunteer service and attending a structured reflection session. Half of the volunteer hours must be completed in the community. Participants can receive credit toward a leadership transcript by documenting service hours and by providing an account of skills obtained and duties performed.

The Department of Campus Recreation sponsors a wide variety of intramural sports, club sports, and recreation activities such as group fitness classes, aquatic programs, gym and fitness programs, special events, and outdoor recreation activities and trips.

=== Greek organizations ===
The Greek community at SIUE has roughly twenty fraternities and sororities.

=== Student media and publications ===
The school newspaper, The Alestle, is named for the school's three campuses: Alton (the location of the dental school), East St. Louis and Edwardsville. The Alestle is a member of the Illinois College Press Association and the Associated Collegiate Press. The Alestle is published exclusively online on Tuesdays and in print on Thursdays during fall and spring semesters and on Wednesdays during summer semesters. It was established in 1960.

WSIE-FM 88.7 is the university-owned radio station that specializes in modern jazz, blues, R&B, news, SIUE sports, and student programming. The station serves the Greater St. Louis Area and Southwestern Illinois and is also available online. The station offers hands-on training for SIUE students to gain knowledge of radio station production.

SIUE Web Radio is a sister organization to WSIE. The station began in 2003 as a branch of the traditional station but eventually broke off and is now a separate organization that partners with the Mass Communications Department and The Alestle.

=== Student Government ===
The Student Government (SG), SIUE's student government, serves the primary function to serve as an advocate on student issues and voice students' concerns about campus issues. The organization has a combined undergraduate and graduate student senate. The student government at SIUE is composed of two branches. The legislative branch consists of twelve senators elected by the student body on a yearly basis. The Executive Board consists of the Student Body President, Student Body Vice President, and Student Trustee who are also elected by the student body. The Financial Officer, Head Justice, Organization Relations Officer, External Affairs Officer, Equity and Wellness Officer, and Communications officer are all considered part of the executive board and are appointed by the Student Body President then confirmed by the Senate.

=== Freedom of speech settlement ===
In late July 2023, SIUE paid a student $80,000 to settle a legal complaint against it for faculty misconduct against a student. The student had expressed conservative views online. Other students complained the views were harmful, and gag and no contact orders were issued against her. Under the settlement, three SIUE professors must undergo compulsory First Amendment training.

== Notable alumni ==
In the Fall of 2019, SIUE had 106,627 living alumni. The SIUE Alumni Association has offices in the B. Barnard Birger Hall.

== See also ==
- Southern Illinois University
