= Performing Arts Training Center =

Defunct dance training center in East St. Louis, IL, USA

- East St. Louis, St. Clair County, Illinois; United States

Information
- Other name: Katherine Dunham Center for the Performing Arts
- Established: 1967; 59 years ago
- Founder: Katherine Dunham
- Affiliation: Southern Illinois University Edwardsville

The Performing Arts Training Center (PATC) was opened in 1967 in East St. Louis, Illinois by African American dancer Katherine Dunham who was then Artist-in-Residence at Southern Illinois University Edwardsville. Dunham partnered with SIUE's Experiment in Higher Education to add educational resources to the program and give the youth of East St. Louis a better educational experience.

The PATC (later known as the Katherine Dunham Center for the Performing Arts) offered credit and non-credit courses in such arts as dance, martial arts, and crafts. At times, its company of dancers has toured widely. Now known as the Performing Arts Program, it is a part of SIUE's East St. Louis Center,
