= SIUE School of Nursing =

Coordinates: 38°47′42″N 89°59′46″W

- Type: Public
- Dean: Laura Bernaix
- Location: Edwardsville, Illinois, U.S.
- Website: www.siue.edu/nursing

The SIUE School of Nursing is an academic unit of Southern Illinois University Edwardsville (SIUE) located in Edwardsville, Illinois, United States. The school has nearly nine hundred (900) students enrolled in its undergraduate, graduate and postgraduate programs.

== History ==
Prior to the development of the Edwardsville campus, six "Divisions of Academic Programs" were established for the SIU Residential Centers in Alton and East St.Louis on March 4, 1960. The nursing program was established as a seventh "Division" on March 29, 1964. When the new Edwardsville campus opened in 1965, the "Divisions" were elevated to School status, and the Nursing Division became the School of Nursing.

== Overview ==
The SIUE School of Nursing consists of the Department of Family Health and Community Health and the Department of Primary Care and Health Systems Nursing.

The school conducts undergraduate Nursing classes on both the SIUE campus and the SIU Carbondale (SIUC) campus. Graduate programs are taught at Edwardsville and at the SIUE School of Nursing Springfield campus.

For the students' clinical work, the SIUE School of Nursing has more than 200 affiliated health care agencies in the Illinois Metro East region, St. Louis, and Southern Illinois.

The school also offers continuing education programs throughout the Southern Illinois region--- programs are mandatory for licensed, registered nurses in the state.

Additionally, the school sponsors the Community Nursing Services program based at the SIUE East St.Louis Center to provide health care services for all ages and health education in Madison and St.Clair Counties.

== Academic programs ==
=== SNAP ===
The federally funded Student Nurse Achievement Program (SNAP) is unique to the SIUE School of Nursing. SNAP is designed to give high school graduates from educationally underserved areas and of diverse racial, ethnic, and cultural backgrounds the opportunity to pursue a nursing degree. The program uses a combination of mentoring, remedial education, study groups, social activities, and community service to assist the SNAP students in achieving their potential.

== The National Children's Study ==
Louise Flick, professor of family health and community health nursing in the School of Nursing received a $4 million grant--- the largest grant ever awarded to an SIUE faculty member--- from the National Institutes of Health to participate in the National Children's Study. The Study will follow a representative sample of American 100,000 children from before birth to age 21, gathering information to prevent and treat some of the nation's most pressing health problems, including autism, birth defects, diabetes, heart disease and obesity.

== SIUE School of Nursing at SIUC ==
SIUE Regional Nursing Program at Carbondale is a cooperative program with students earning a BSN degree from SIUE while doing their coursework on the SIUC campus. Classes are either face-to-face lectures or teleconferences. This is an SIUE degree.

== SIUE School of Nursing Springfield Campus ==
The SIUE School of Nursing also operates a satellite campus in Springfield that offers graduate level coursework in close proximity to the SIU School of Medicine. Instruction is delivered by a combination of live and teleconferenced lectures.

== Faculty ==
The SIUE School of Nursing faculty consists of 70 full-time and part-time educators, most of whom either possess a doctoral degree or are enrolled in a doctoral program.

== Accreditation ==
The SIUE School of Nursing is fully accredited by the Commission on Collegiate Nursing Education (CCNE) for a period of ten years, the longest period given, and CCNE rated the school A+ for its "inspiring program." Additionally, the Certified Nurse Anesthesia Program is fully accredited by the Council on Accreditation of Nurse Anesthesia Programs.

== Alumni ==
The SIUE School of Nursing has more than 5,400 living alumni
