= SIUE School of Business =

Coordinates: 38°47′42″N 89°59′46″W

SIU Edwardsville School of Business
- Type: Public
- Dean: Timothy S. Schoenecker
- Location: Edwardsville, Illinois, U.S.
- Website: www.siue.edu/business

The SIUE School of Business is an academic unit of Southern Illinois University Edwardsville (SIUE) located in Edwardsville, Illinois, United States.

== History ==
Before the establishment of the Edwardsville campus, the school was organized as one of six "Divisions of Academic Programs" within the Residential Centers in Alton and East St. Louis. When the institution moved to its new campus in 1965, these divisions were restructured into the Schools of Business, Education, Fine Arts, Humanities, Science and Technology, and Social Sciences.

The School of Business includes the Departments of Accounting, Computer Management & Information Systems, Economics & Finance, and Management & Marketing. It offers thirteen undergraduate majors and specializations, as well as seven graduate programs. The school also hosts the Army and Air Force Reserve Officers' Training Corps programs. Most classes are conducted in Alumni Hall and Founders Hall.

== Business outreach ==
The Southwestern Illinois Entrepreneurship Center serves as a facilitating intermediary between entrepreneurs and existing resources. The goal of the center is to provide in-depth assistance and accelerated services to entrepreneurs as well as to promotes an entrepreneurial culture throughout the region. The center works with entrepreneurs and small businesses from start-up phase through the transition/exit phase. The center is available to: 1) coordinate support services for clients to address gaps and limitations in their current operations; 2) conduct business assessments to identify gaps and limitations in the client's operations; 3) provide business coaching services to assist clients in developing professional funding proposals for potential investors; 4) provide advanced financial assistance and planning including determining capital needs and making investor introductions; 5) provide targeted accelerated services for clients that have high growth potential.

The International Trade Center is one of six trade centers in Illinois. The SIUE trade center serves businesses in the 47 southernmost counties by providing: 1) individualized, cost-free export consultation to Illinois businesses; 2) international market analysis to identify the best trading opportunities; 3) identification of foreign buyers, agents and/or distributors through trade leads; 4) seminars on international business strategies, export procedures, distribution practices, methods of payment, and the latest exporting trends; 5) export finance assistance in coordination with the Export-Import Bank of the U.S. and the Small Business Administration's Export Working Capital Program; 6) access to extensive export trade reference material and the International Trade Data Bank.

The Small Business Development Center (SBDC) conducts seminars and workshops throughout the year addressing topics that are important to all business owners. The SBDC also provides fee-free one-on-one counseling services to new and existing businesses. The SBDC will review business plans and discuss financing options, marketing, management, and other topics of concern to its clients. For companies requiring specialized attention, the SBDC can act as a referral source for specialized professionals and consultants for business plan development, cash flow analysis, marketing plan development, database searches for financing sources, mailing lists, and more. SBDC maintains a resource room containing computer programs, video tapes, and reference material on a variety of business topics.

== Executive & continuing education ==
The Construction Leadership Institute was jointly developed by the SIUE School of Business and the SIUE School of Engineering's Department of Construction. The Construction Leadership Institute is specifically designed for individuals employed by or working with general or specialty contractors who are or aspire to be a construction company president, vice-president, chief operating officer, branch manager, senior project manager, or chief financial officer.

The Project Management Workshops provide an executive education program for project managers. Curriculum is developed by a steering committee of experienceded project management professionals. Instruction is provided by a team of project management professionals from diverse industries and SIUE faculty.

The SIUE School of Business Symposia provides a forum for business decision-makers in the St. Louis metropolitan area to exchange ideas and knowledge with peers, School of Business faculty, and area experts on complex management issues. Since 1998, the School of Business has hosted a series of one-day programs that provide a venue for sharing knowledge and ideas on many challenging issues, giving participants an opportunity to gain a deeper understanding of the issues confronting them and encouraging the development of innovative approaches to finding solutions.

== Accreditation ==
The SIUE School of Business and its Department of Accounting are accredited by the Association to Advance Collegiate Schools of Business (AACSB).

== Alumni ==
The SIUE School of Business has more than 20,000 living alumni.
