= Lovejoy Library =

Library in Edwardsville, Illinois

Coordinates: 38°47′38″N 89°59′52″W

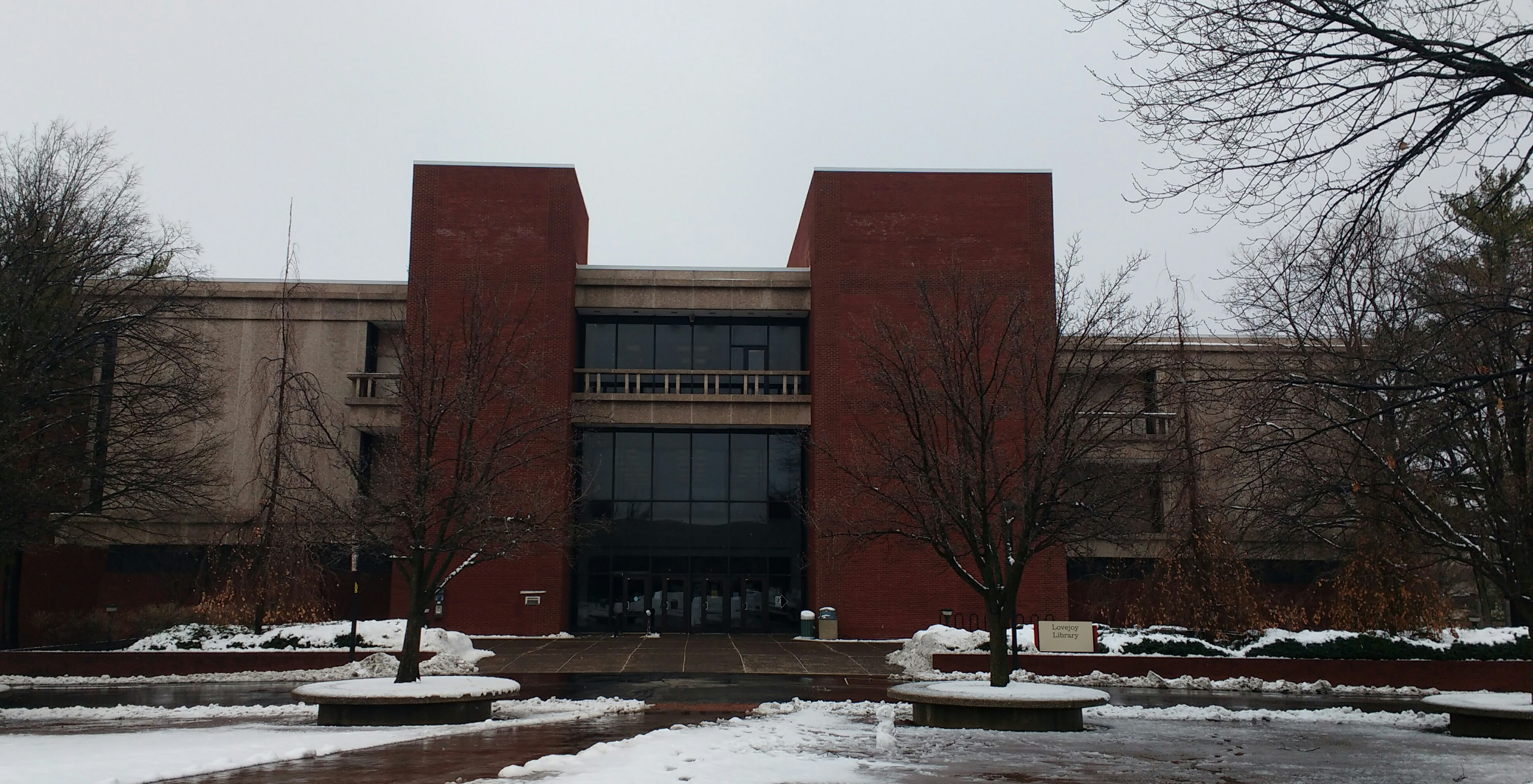
- Type: Public university
- Dean: Marlee Graser
- Location: Edwardsville, Illinois, United States
- Website: www.siue.edu

Lovejoy Library at Southern Illinois University Edwardsville opened in 1965 and is located on the Stratton Quadrangle of the SIUE campus. The library was named for Elijah Parish Lovejoy, American Presbyterian minister, journalist and newspaper editor who, in 1837, was murdered by a mob in nearby Alton for his abolitionist views.

== Collections ==
Lovejoy Library houses a collection of more than 800,000 copies of nearly 600,000 book titles; over 1,675,000 microfilm units; 10,000 electronic book titles; 26,000+ periodical subscriptions, including almost 23,800 electronic journals; in excess of 33,000 audio-visual units, including some 5,000 video/DVDs. Additionally, Lovejoy Library has been a selective depository in the Federal Depository Library Program for U.S. government documents since 1965, selectively adding to its general collection some 500,000 government publications (in a variety of formats from paper to electronic) that are a complement to the University's curriculum.

=== Special collections ===
Among the numerous special collections to be found in the Lovejoy Library are:

- The National Ragtime and Jazz Archive includes recordings, interviews, and research materials on and about jazz musicians, particularly from the St Louis area. Items in the collection also include audio and videotapes, sheet music, piano rolls, photographs, and oral history materials. Included within the NRJA are the NJRA Record Collection of more than 20,000 recordings including the John Randolph Collection
- The Eugene B. Redmond Collection: the poet has donated a collection including his personal library, manuscripts, photographs, posters, and other items.
- The Louisa H. Bowen University Archives and Special Collections compiled by the late university archivist, preserves materials pertaining to SIU Edwardsville and to the history of Southwestern Illinois.
- The Rare Books Collection was largely acquired by John Cushman Abbott (1921-2005), the Lovejoy Library's first director.
- Music and Music-related Collections: Some seventeen separate collections, including those of composer/conductor Walter Damrosch, violinist/educator Shinichi Suzuki, and pianist/educator Ruth Slenczynska. The Albert Richard Mohr Collection is said to be the world's largest collection of music manuscripts and miscellany of modern European composers, with dozens of composers from nineteen countries represented.

== Friends of Lovejoy Library ==
The library is strongly supported by the Friends of Lovejoy Library. Since 1965, the group has contributed more than $2.6 million to enhance library collections, equipment and programs. Establishing 31 endowments worth more than $800,000, the group was recognized nationally in 1991 and 1995 as the top academic friends' group in the country by Friends of Libraries U.S.A., a consortium of library friends organizations now known as the Association of Library Trustees, Advocates, Friends and Foundations (ALTAFF.)
