= Clifton F. Conrad =

American academic

Clifton F. Conrad is Professor Emeritus of Higher Education and Vilas Distinguished Professor at the University of Wisconsin–Madison.

Conrad was president of the Association for the Study of Higher Education in 1987–1988. He has consulted, taught, or both in South America, Europe, Asia, and the Middle East.

== Bibliography ==
- Conrad, Clifton F. and Todd Lundberg. Learning with Others: Collaborative Learning as a Pathway to College Student Success. Baltimore, Maryland: The Johns Hopkins University Press, 2022.
- Conrad, Clifton F. and Laura Dunek. Cultivating Inquiry-Driven Learners: A College Education for the 21st Century. Baltimore, Maryland: The Johns Hopkins University Press, 2020. (Second Edition.)
- Conrad, Clifton F. and Marybeth Gasman. Educating a Diverse Nation: Lessons from Minority-Serving Institutions. Cambridge, Massachusetts & London, England: Harvard University Press, 2015.
- Conrad, Clifton F. and Laura Dunek. Cultivating Inquiry-Driven Learners: A College Education for the 21st Century. Baltimore, Maryland: The Johns Hopkins University Press, 2012.
- Conrad, Clifton F. and Ronald Serlin (co-editors). The SAGE Handbook on Research in Education: Ideas as the Keystone of Exemplary Inquiry. Thousand Oaks, CA: SAGE, 2011. (Second Edition.)
- Conrad, Clifton F. and Jennifer Grant Haworth. Emblems of Quality: Developing and Sustaining High-Quality Academic Programs. Boston, Massachusetts: Allyn and Bacon, 1997.
- Conrad, Clifton F., Haworth, Jennifer Grant, and Millar, Susan Bolyard. A Silent Success: Master's Education in the United States. Baltimore, Maryland: The Johns Hopkins University Press, 1993.
