= SIUE College of Arts and Sciences =

Educational institution in Edwardsville, Illinois, USA

Coordinates: 38°47′42″N 89°59′46″W

- Type: Public
- Dean: Kevin Leonard, PhD
- Location: Edwardsville, Illinois, U.S.
- Website: www.siue.edu/artsandsciences

SIUE College of Arts and Sciences, often referred to as CAS, is an academic college of Southern Illinois University Edwardsville located in Edwardsville, Illinois, United States.

== History ==
Prior to the development of the Edwardsville campus, six "Divisions of Academic Programs" were established for the SIU Residential Centers in Alton and East St.Louis on March 4, 1960.

Once the move was made to the new campus in 1965, the "Divisions" became the Schools of Business, Education, Fine Arts, Humanities, Science and Technology, and Social Sciences.

The College of Arts and Sciences was formed by the merger of the former University College with the Schools of Fine Arts and Communications, Humanities, Sciences, and Social Sciences between September 9, 1993 and July 1, 1995.

== Academics ==
The CAS and its twenty (20) departments govern 22 undergraduate and 25 postgraduate degree programs and a large number of minor academic concentrations in the arts, humanities, social sciences, and natural sciences.

== Departments ==
The College of Arts and Sciences consists of the Departments of Anthropology, Applied Communication Studies, Art and Design, Biological Sciences, Chemistry, English Language and Literature, Environmental Sciences, Foreign Languages and Literature, Geography, Historical Studies, Mass Communications, Mathematics and Statistics, Music, Philosophy, Physics, Political Science, Public Administration and Policy Analysis, Social Work, Sociology and Criminal Justice Studies, Theater and Dance; the CAS also conducts a number of interdisciplinary programs.

== Facilities ==
With few exceptions, the offices of and classes within the CAS are held in Alumni Hall, the Art and Design Building, Founders Hall, John Mason Peck Hall, Katherine Dunham Hall, and the new Science Building.

== New growth ==
In the Fall of 2009, it was announced that after more than 10 years of requesting money from the Illinois Legislature to build a new science building, funding had been set aside for the project. Nearly $80 million was pledged to the University as part of the Illinois Jobs Now bill. A groundbreaking for the new building took place in December, 2009. After construction got underway in September 2010, the project built a brand new sciences lab building that was opened in the Fall of 2013. Then scheduling was set to close the existing Science Building in January 2014, with the older building to be gutted and renovated over the ensuing two years.
