= SIUE School of Pharmacy =

Pharmacy school in Edwardsville, Illinois, US

Coordinates: 38°47′27″N 89°59′28″W

- Type: Public
- Dean: Mark Luer
- Academic staff: 39
- Doctoral students: 324
- Location: Edwardsville, Illinois, U.S.
- Website: www.siue.edu/pharmacy

SIUE School of Pharmacy is an academic unit of Southern Illinois University Edwardsville located in Edwardsville, Illinois, United States. Opened in 2005, it is one of six pharmacy schools in Illinois and the only one located outside the Chicago metropolitan area.

== Overview ==
Established in 2005, the SIUE School of Pharmacy is composed of the Departments of Pharmaceutical Sciences and Pharmacy Practice with a combined faculty of 42, most of whom hold doctoral degrees.

Currently, the school offers only the professional practice Doctor of Pharmacy (Pharm.D.) degree. This program is a four year course of study following a minimum prerequisite of two years of pre-pharmacy study. The program includes 3 years of study on the Edwardsville campus and one full year of "on-the-job" education at an area clinical site.

Admitting about 80 students per year, the school has more than 300 students.

=== The Express Scripts Drug Information & Wellness Center ===
The Center is a unit of the Department of Pharmacy Practice and serves as a drug information and wellness center for Central and Southern Illinois. It is named in recognition of the Express Scripts Foundation's multi-year support of the School.

=== International recognition ===
The SIUE School of Pharmacy gained international recognition when, in 2009, it organized and hosted the Strategic Planning Summit for the Advancement of Pain and Palliative Care Pharmacy with a Mayday Fund grant to "...educate and discuss the concepts of pain and palliative care and how those concepts pertains to today’s professional pharmacist." The recommendations of the Summit were accepted in July 2010 by the American Academy of Hospice and Palliative Medicine (AAHPM).

== Facilities ==
The SIUE School of Pharmacy has its offices and principal laboratories in the School of Pharmacy Lab Building in the University Park research and technology complex on the SIUE campus. Classrooms and additional labs and offices are in the 200 University Park Building, the Technology and Management Center, and the Biotechnology Laboratory Incubator, all also located in University Park.

== Accreditation ==
The SIUE School of Pharmacy is fully accredited by the Accreditation Council for Pharmacy Education (ACPE).
