= American Art Therapy Association =

- Industry: Art; Therapy
- Founded: 1969
- Headquarters: Alexandria, Virginia, U.S.
- Key people: Girija Kaimal, EdD, MA, ATR-BC, President; Nadia F. Paredes, MA, LFT, ATR, President-Elect; Raquel Farrell-Kirk, MS, ATR-BC, Secretary; Marygrace Berberian, PhD, LCAT, ATR-BC, LCSW, Treasurer
- Website: http://www.arttherapy.org

The American Art Therapy Association (AATA) is a U.S. not-for-profit 501(c)(3), non-partisan national professional association of approximately 5,000 practicing art therapy professionals, including students, educators, and related practitioners in the field of art therapy based in Alexandria, Virginia. It establishes criteria for training and licensing of art therapists, maintains job banks, sponsors conferences, and publishes a newsletter and a journal Art Therapy: the journal of the American Art Therapy Association. Founded in 1969, the AATA is one of the world's leading art therapy membership organizations.

== Mission statement ==
The mission of the American Art Therapy Association, Inc. is to advocate for expansion of access to professional art therapists and lead the nation in the advancement of art therapy as a regulated mental health and human services profession.

== Publication ==
AATA's academic journal is entitled Art Therapy: the Journal of the American Art Therapy Association. This journal has been published for more than 25 years. The Art Therapy Journal exhibits leading research by professional art therapists, as well as non-art therapists whose research relates to the field, from around the world. The Journal is the leading publication in the field of art therapy. Its purpose is to provide a scholarly forum to advance the understanding of how art therapy and visual art contribute to the treatment, education, development, and enrichment of people. It aims to advance knowledge and research on contemporary art therapy practice, theory, education, and research. Articles and subscriptions for non-AATA members are available for purchase from the Taylor and Francis website.

== Membership and credentials ==
AATA has 36 affiliated State and Regional Chapters with their own membership base, websites, meetings and advocacy activities on the local level that promote the profession of art therapy and the interests of the membership. AATA has both U.S. and international members.

AATA created the Art Therapy Credentials Board in 1993, which has been a separate organization, since 1 February 2010, when the AATA Board approved a legal Separation Agreement that eliminated AATA's involvement in ATCB's governance structure. ATCB is the national U.S. credentialing body for professional art therapists who meet stringent qualifications. AATA started the ATCB to provide credibility to the existing Registered Art Therapists (ATR) and to create board certification requirements for an advanced credential. ATCB credentialing programs enable art therapists to become credentialed in three tiers with an optional first designation: first tier is Registration (ATR) and Provisional (ATR-P) as an optional first designation working towards Registration, Board Certification (ATR-BC) and as an Art Therapy Certified Supervisor (ATCS). Only ATCB-credentialed art therapists are legally entitled to use these suffixes with their names. The requirements for each certification are different. A minimum of a master's degree in art therapy is required to sit for the Registered Art Therapists Exam, and 1,000 clinical hours and references from at least 3 supervisors may also be required. To sit for the Board Certified Art Therapist certification, one must be an ATR in good standing with a passing score on the Art Therapy Credentials Board Examination. There are two ways to get the Art Therapy Certified Supervisor credential. First, those getting approved based on their education, must have at least 100 hours of clinical experience supervising art therapists. Secondly, those looking to qualify based on experience in the field must have at least 500 hours and 36 months of experience as a supervisor.

The creation of the Art Therapy Credentials Board Examination (ATCBE) was created as a way to certify qualified art therapists. Board certification is a measurement of a professional's knowledge base, as compared to registration that sanctions an art therapist's education and post-graduate supervised experience. Within the past two decades, the ATCB has credentialed over 6,200 art therapists.

== Notable members ==
- Frances F. Kaplan, editor of Art Therapy: the Journal of the American Art Therapy Association from 2001 until 2005
