= Francis Reitmann =

British psychiatrist

Dr. Francis Reitmann (1905–1955) was a Hungarian Jewish émigré psychiatrist. Schooled in the biological psychiatric tradition of Ladislas J. Meduna in Budapest prior to his exile to the Maudsley Hospital in 1938 . In the 1930s, after studying with Ladislas J. Meduna, he worked at Maudsley Hospital. In 1945 he was appointed as Director of Clinical Research at Netherne Hospital in Coulsdon, and worked with Eric Cunningham Dax. He was involved in the research sessions into art and mental health run by Edward Adamson, the pioneer of Art Therapy, between 1946 and 1950. In 1950 he published his influential book, "Psychotic Art".

Reitmann followed the theory of biological psychiatry that organic defects were the sole source of mental illness, and therefore mental problems could be treated by physical means; he carried out experiments in the fields of shock therapy and leucotomy

His surname is sometimes spelled Reitman.
