= Hoffberger =

Hoffberger is a surname. Notable people with the surname include:

- Jerold Hoffberger (1919–1999), American businessman
- Rebecca Alban Hoffberger (born 1952), American museum director
