= Adrian Hill (disambiguation) =

Adrian Hill (1895–1977) was a British artist, author, art therapist, educator and broadcaster.

Adrian Hill may also refer to:

- Adrian V. S. Hill (born 1958), Irish vaccinologist
- Adrian Hill (American football official)
