= Alfajiri Street Kids Art =

Charitable organization based in Nairobi

- Company type: Charity
- Founded: 2015
- Headquarters: Nairobi, Kenya
- Website: www.alfajiri.org

Alfajiri Street Kids Art (Alfajiri) is a non-profit organization headquartered in Nairobi, working to support and rehabilitate street children in Kenya. It was founded in 2015 by Lenore Boyd, an Australian artist Its focus is using creative outlets such as painting and dance to engage at-risk children while seeking to provide them with safe spaces where they can grow and express themselves.

== History ==
Alfajiri Street Kids Art was inspired in 2012 when its founder, Lenore Boyd, was visiting Nairobi on a volunteer mission. A chance encounter with a young child living on the street inspired her to begin Alfajiri in 2015 along with a group of deeply concerned and proactive young Kenyans whose mission would be to go beyond the provision of the immediate needs of street children (such as food and clothing) and offer them a platform for creative self-expression, and to find healing through their engagement with art. Alfajiri's approach distinguishes it from traditional outreach organizations as it focuses on inviting street children to share their personal stories through art.

== The struggles of street children in Nairobi ==
Nairobi is home to at least 60,000 street children. This challenge reflects the broader issues of poverty and homelessness in Kenya. Problems faced by these children include societal rejection, exposure to abuse, and struggle for survival. The root causes of their homelessness include death of a parent (often due to HIV/AIDS), extreme poverty, and domestic violence.

== Art as a therapeutic outlet ==
Alfajiri launched its art therapy program in 2015 after its stakeholders recognized that art has significant therapeutic potential. Sketching, painting, and drawing are outlets that have helped street kids to reflect, heal, and express themselves. Art is also motivating as it has helped the children involved in the program to recognize their inner strengths, to build confidence, and to believe in their own ability to succeed in life.

== Success stories ==
Alfajiri has transformed the lives of many children who have participated in its art program. These kids are commonly referred to as ‘The Alfajiri Artists’, and their works have been displayed at exhibitions both in Kenya and in Europe. Success stories include the case of John, a young Alfajiri artist who completed his studies prior to pursuing a rewarding career in pastry, with Alfajiri's support.

== Challenges encountered and efforts to assist ==
In spite of Alfajiri's efforts, many street children, particularly girls, have continued to face such challenges as exploitation and sexual abuse. The attempts to reintegrate the rehabilitated youths back into their families and communities in general have also been derailed by unforeseen impediments. Ultimately, a number of children return to the streets upon being rejected by their kin.

== COVID-19 response ==
The outbreak of the COVID-19 global pandemic introduced additional challenges for the stakeholders of Alfajiri Street Kids. As schools were closed nationwide, the organization had to provide its beneficiaries with formal education about safety measures, in addition to organizing places for them to stay or reuniting them with their families. The impact of the pandemic has greatly escalated the economic challenges faced by these families. Yet another challenge was that the eateries that had provided Alfajiri with discounted food were shut down due to the pandemic, exacerbating the difficulties faced by Nairobi's street children. The effects of the pandemic are still being felt by the stakeholders of Alfajiri Street Kids.

== Call for collaboration ==
As the Director of Alfajiri, Lenore Boyd encourages the local population to embrace the idea of supporting a non-governmental organization of their choice. Alfajiri has also been calling on establishments such as churches to provide temporary accommodation for the street children. That kind of support is particularly needed during such challenging times as when the society is enduring a pandemic.

Stakeholders of Alfajiri argue that challenges like poverty and homelessness in Kenya would be best addressed if there is strong governmental commitment and enhanced societal awareness. They also believe that international well-wishers have a role to play in regard to providing sustainable solutions to these problems. Alfajiri Street Kids is a beacon of hope for the street children in Nairobi. The organization offers them avenues to express themselves and to heal from the traumas they have endured.

Through art, the street children become motivated into envisioning a better future despite all the pain and suffering they have experienced in the past.
