= Edward Adamson =

British artist

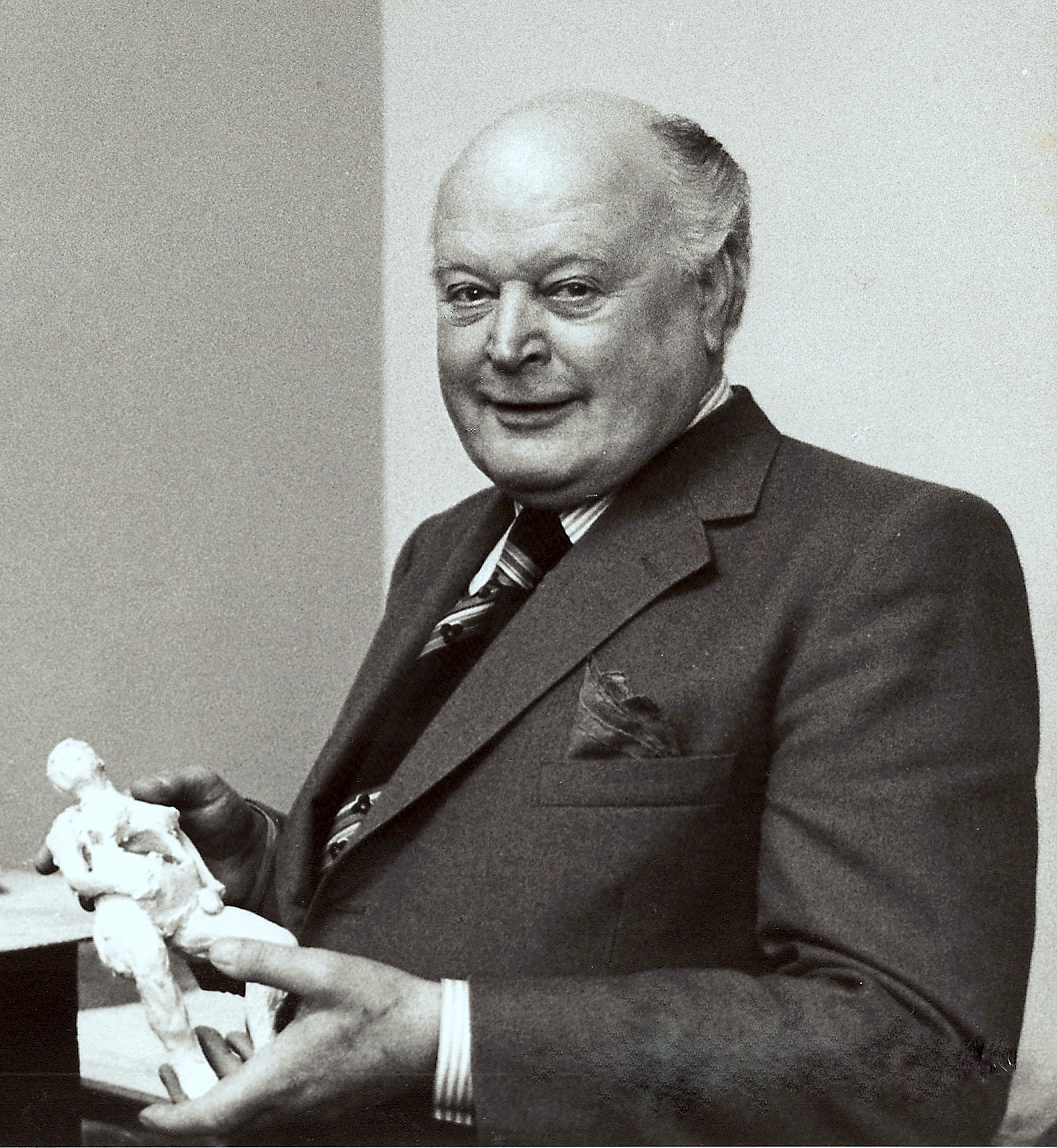
- Born: 31 May 1911; Sale, Greater Manchester, England
- Died: 3 February 1996 (aged 84); West Brompton, London, England

Edward Adamson (31 May 1911 – 3 February 1996) was a British artist, "the father of Art Therapy in Britain", and the creator of the Adamson Collection.

== Early years: Sale, Tunbridge Wells, WW2 (1911–1945) ==
Edward Adamson was born in 1911 at Sale, near Manchester, in Cheshire. He had two brothers. Later his family moved to Tunbridge Wells in Kent. They were well off, successful in manufacturing. This gave Adamson some financial independence to achieve all he did during his life. He received a degree in fine art from Bromley School of Art in London (now part of Ravensbourne College).

Subsequently, he trained and qualified as a chiropodist, at his parents' behest as they wanted him to have 'a proper profession', concerned about his livelihood as an artist. He probably only saw a few patients – though his brass plate is in the Edward Adamson Archive at the Wellcome Library: 'E.J.Adamson. M.B.A.Ch. Chiropodist' (a gift from his parents, but never hung).

Then Adamson returned to a career in art, working as a graphic artist at a Fleet Street advertising agency for the rest of the 1930s, while doing his own drawings and paintings, which he exhibited in both London and Paris. During World War II, he was a conscientious objector, serving as a medical orderly in the Royal Army Medical Corps, the Army happy to have him as a qualified chiropodist. He became interested in helping long-term hospital patients pass the time.

== Netherne and Hollywood Road ==
=== Art and research at Netherne (1946–1951) ===
After the War, he volunteered to work with Adrian Hill, an artist who had coined the term "Art Therapy" in 1942 while a patient in tuberculosis sanatoria, teaching drawing and painting to his fellow patients, and, later, to hospitalised soldiers. At the time Adamson met him, Hill was working with the Red Cross Picture Library to loan and lecture on reproductions of paintings to patients in British hospitals to enhance their recovery. Adamson was in the group who first brought this programme to a long-stay mental hospital - Netherne Hospital, Surrey – in 1946.

During his early visits to Netherne, Adamson was given several drawings by a man on a locked ward - known as Radcliffe since new research in 2024 (formerly JJ Beegan) - made with the only materials he had, char from burnt matches and toilet paper. These objects were the first collected by Adamson, and the start of the Adamson Collection.

known as Radcliffe (formerly JJ Beegan),"Untitled", crayon on paper (hospital library book flyleaf), c1946. Adamson Collection - Wellcome Collection.

The Medical Superintendent, the psychiatrist Eric Cunningham Dax (1908 - 2008), was impressed by Adamson's rapport at his lectures with the people who were compelled to live at Netherne. Dax asked him to facilitate a new research art studio at Netherne, to investigate the role of art in the diagnosis and treatment of mental disorder - a project maybe of its time. This project was the post-war continuation of the 1930s research at the Maudsley Hospital on art and psychosis (and mescaline) by the psychiatrists Eric Guttmann (1896–1948), Walter Maclay (1902–1964) and Francis Reitman (1905–1955) – the latter was Head of Clinical Research at Netherne from 1945.

The research art sessions were run single-handedly by Adamson from 1946 to 1950, and, according to Robertson, 689 people painted with Adamson in this period. Robertson does not report how many works were created in this period, only referring to

"The number of paintings per patient showed extreme variation. It seemed that the most standard comparison could be attained by confining attention to the first 10 pictures of the 215 patients who had painted at least that number".

It may be reasonable to infer that at least 3000 paintings were created. In early 2013, several small ceramics, with '1948' written on their base, were found in storage. It had not been known Adamson was encouraging people to work with clay at this time.

The people painted in "experimental and reproducible conditions": everyone had identical easels, with the same materials available, and even the same size sheets of paper (22 by 18 inches, 55 cm by 45 cm). Adamson was to provide only minimal technical advice. Initially Adamson worked inside the hospital in a committee room with up to forty patients at once, conducting at first two sessions, and, later, four per week. Another early location was a shower room, chosen by the nursing staff to be easy to clean afterwards. By 1948, when he was employed full-time, a studio was built in the hospital grounds for Adamson's own use. This building was a converted army hut, 48 feet (15 metres) by 16 feet (5 metres), and able to accommodate twenty people 'with comfort'. From 1948, Adamson also saw, for two hours each morning, a group of women, on a ward of the main hospital, most of whom had the diagnosis of schizophrenia, and who had all lived in Netherne for many years.

In 1950, Dax lectured on and showed paintings from the early Netherne sessions (alongside works from 45 collections, including from five other British mental hospitals) at the influential "International Exhibition of Psychopathological Art", held at the Sainte-Anne Hospital in Paris during the First World Congress of Psychiatry. Dax describes the Sainte-Anne show at as "probably the second most important event in the history of psychiatric art, the first being the collection of pictures by Prinzhorn from Heidelberg and his 1922 publication "The Prinzhorn Collection" (Dax is referring to Prinzhorn's highly influential book, " Artistry of the Mentally Ill: a contribution to the psychology and psychopathology of configuration") One critic wrote, 'The parallels between the works of patients and the art of 20th Century painters - expressionists, surrealists, and certain pure abstract painters - is established without a doubt'.

Reitman drew heavily on the findings from these art sessions, and used works which are now in the Adamson Collection, for his 1950 book, "Psychotic Art": though Adamson is mentioned in the acknowledgments, Reitman writes little on Adamson's contribution. Dax published his full account of the results in 1953 in "Experimental Studies in Psychiatric Art": Adamson only warranting a single mention by name:

"In 1946, an artist, Mr E.J. Adamson was engaged for 2 sessions weekly in the reception hospital, then for half time, and since 1948 he has been appointed on a full-time basis. His experience was that of a commercial artist who was lecturing in both sanatoria and mental hospitals. He had not been analysed nor did he have any special knowledge of psychology, but he was particularly interested in the evolution of artistic products, and the use of art activities in the treatment of the psychiatric illnesses" (p19-20).

Dax left Netherne in 1951 to move to Australia in 1952, taking "a few pictures and tapestries (20, according to Dr Eugen Koh, former director, Dax Centre) from Netherne shown at the 1950 exhibition [the "International Exhibition of Psychopathological Art"], and these formed the basis of the (Dax) collection", p3. The Dax Collection is housed at the Dax Centre at the University of Melbourne (Dax Centre), which holds 'over 15,000 creative works on paper, paintings, ceramics, and textiles created by people who have experienced mental illness or psychological trauma' - and is now under the director Charmaine Smith.

=== Art and healing at Netherne (1951–1981) ===
Adamson continued working at Netherne until his retirement in 1981, enabling and encouraging hundreds of people to express themselves through art. Out of the 1946-1950 quasi-scientific 'experiments', Adamson established an open art studio, allowing people to come and paint freely: a radical act when those detained in the 'asylums' were living in bleak conditions, profoundly excluded from society, with minimum dignity, autonomy or even personal possessions. By 1970 he had 5 studios (including the army hut) in the grounds at Netherne, with a gallery for the Adamson Collection (see below), which at that time contained an estimated 60,000 works: he kept all the paintings, drawings, ceramics and sculptures created in the studios.

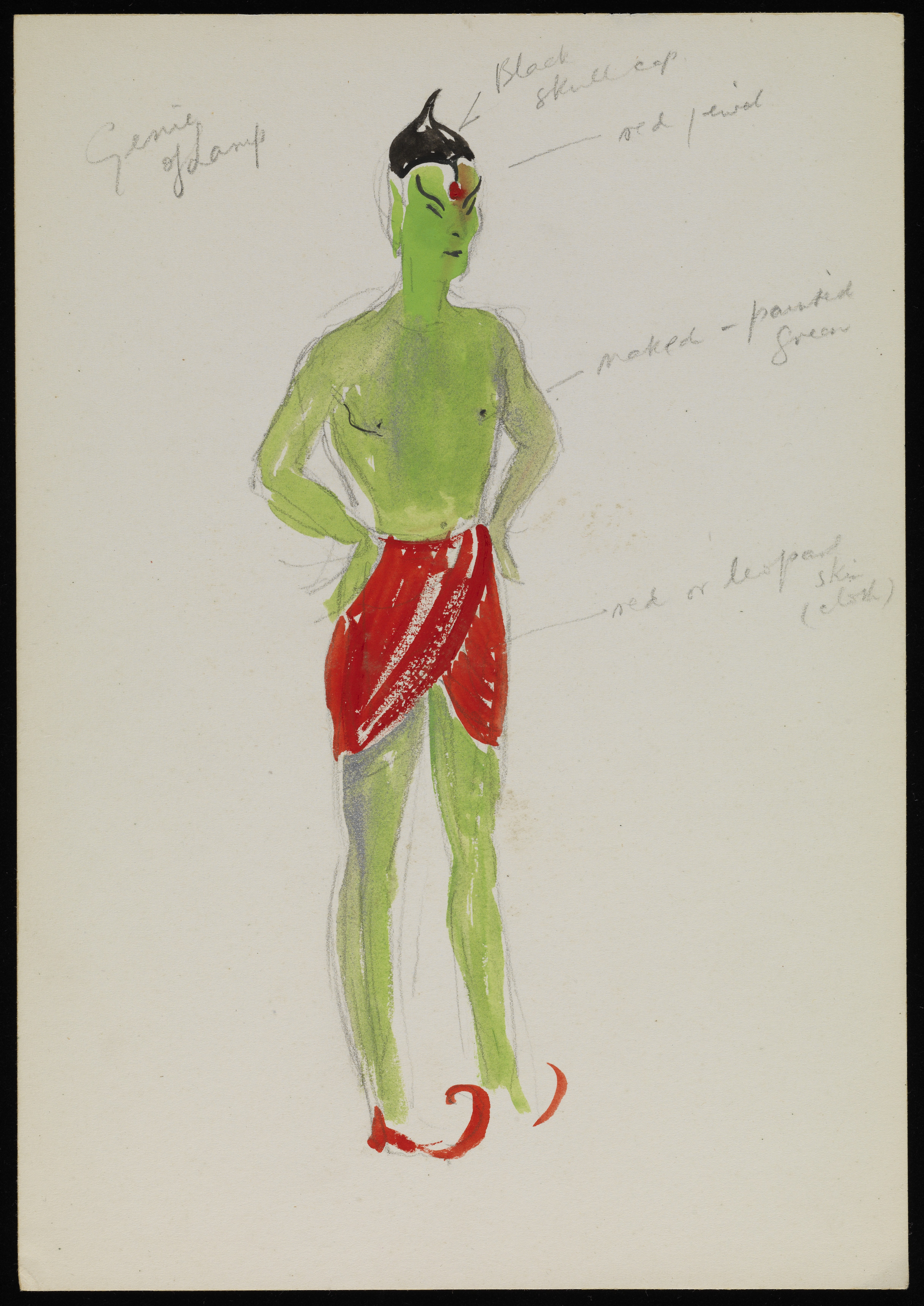
Painting of a genie costume design for Netherne pantomime by Adamson. Edward Adamson Archive, Wellcome.

Adamson was more widely involved across the hospital, from having the courage of having endless corridor walls painted primrose yellow to designing costumes for the annual pantomime, a key feature of asylum life in Britain at the time.

Among the artists he encouraged at Netherne were the painter William Kurelek (1927–1977), the sculptor Rolanda Polonsky (1923-1996 - Rolanda preferred Polonska, the Polish feminine spelling of her surname, and she is also known as Polonski but her family have accepted she has become known as 'Polonsky'), for both of whom he secured studios in disused rooms in the hospital; and the illustrator and engraver George Buday (1907–1990), for whom Adamson took over a summerhouse in the grounds of Netherne for his printing press. Kurelek came to Netherne from the Maudsley in November 1953 to work with Edward Adamson for 14 months. He gave the Adamson Collection three major paintings created while he was at Netherne: "Where Am I? Who Am I? Why Am I?", "I Spit On Life", and "The Ball of Twine and Other Nonsense". About the last, completed shortly before he left hospital, Kurelek said,

"I have never really been mad. I was only fooling. I had you all on the end of a piece of string all the time!"

Polonsky had been an artist before she was compelled to live in Netherne, probably 1948 to 1982, but when Adamson first met her, she was scrubbing the hospital floors. For Polonsky to practise her sculpture, Adamson had to persuade the hospital authorities to lift the restrictions on 'potential offensive weapons in the hands of mental patients' so she could have a hammer and chisel. In 1971 the Arts Council of Great Britain released a short film, "Rolanda Polonsky, Sculptor". Polonsky is filmed at Netherne, where she had already been living for 24 years, 'talking about her work, and the meanings that it has for her. Her art is deeply religious and personal, and she uses Christian themes in a refreshing and idiosyncratic way'. The film features, among other works, her masterpiece Stations of the Cross, which are in the Collection (along with several other sculptures and about 2500 sketches and drawings) but are still the original plaster casts, funding never found to cast them in bronze.

Adamson met his long-term partner and collaborator, the teacher and writer John Timlin (1930–2020), in 1953 at Timlin's production of Kenneth Woollard's play "Morning Departure" (1948). Timlin was working with 'emotionally disturbed' children in East London, and subsequently contacted Adamson about a series of drawings of apples by a boy, Tommy, who he was working with. Adamson visited the school, and met the children and looked at their paintings. Adamson and Timlin then worked together until Adamson's death. They wrote and lectured on art and mental health, and exhibited the Adamson Collection across the world, including Europe, Japan, Canada and the United States.

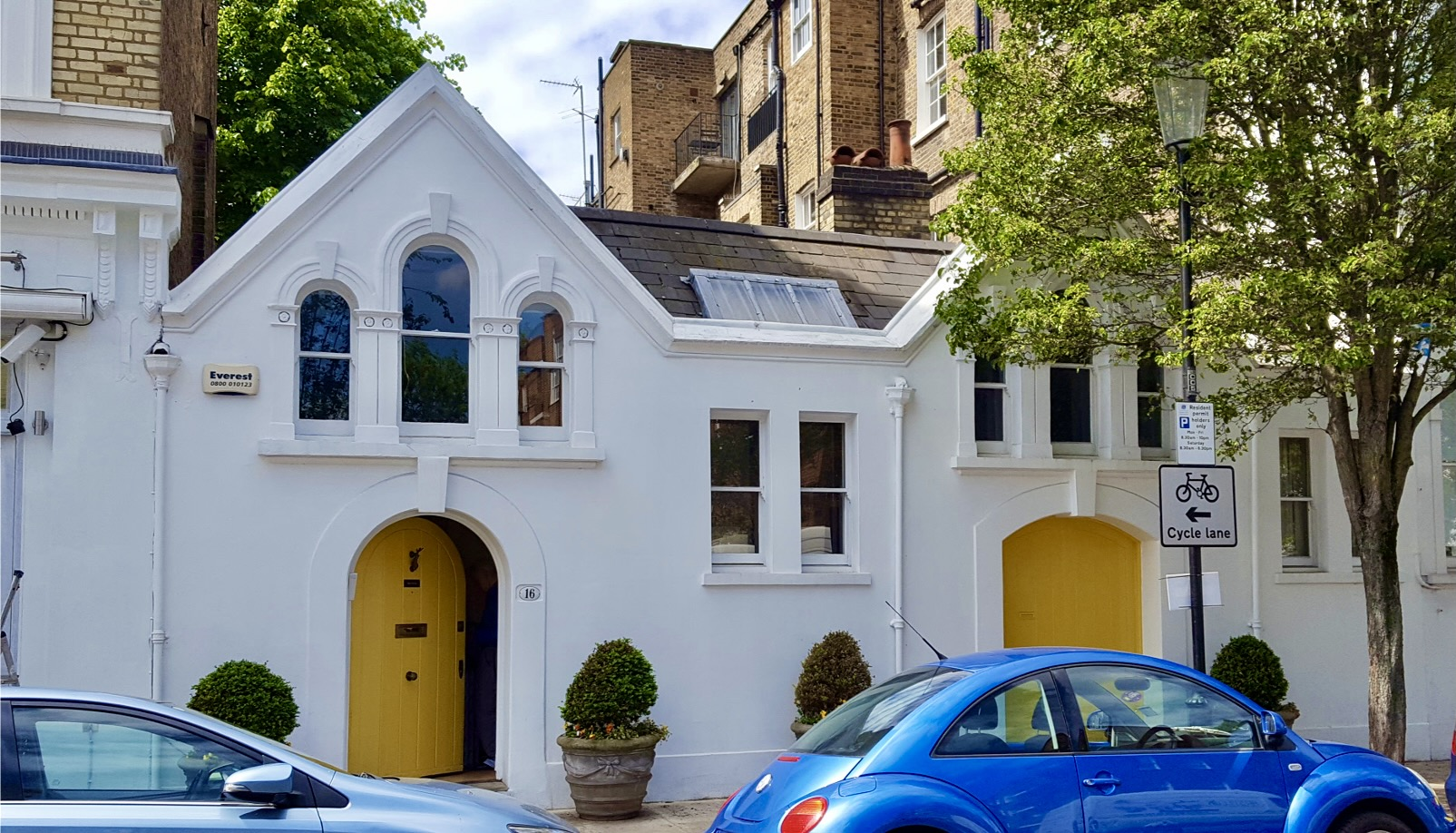
The Studios, Hollywood Road.

By the mid-1970s, Adamson moved into the Studios, Hollywood Road, London. A pair of artists studios, Adamson lived in one and saw patients in the other - particularly after his retirement from Netherne in 1981 - until 1996. Hollywood Road remained at the centre of the Adamson Collection and Adamson Collection Trust until John Timlin died at there on the morning of 11 September 2020. In 2012 Wellcome Collection relocated documents, photographs, notebooks and other material to become the Edward Adamson Archive at Wellcome Edward Adamson Archive.

== Art therapy in the UK ==
Adamson was the first artist employed in the National Health Service. He commenced work in 1946 at Netherne Hospital at an annual salary of just £1000. This was never subsequently increased in line with inflation. The reason given was that his post was not officially recognised at the time, and it was "not on the establishment". A Charitable Trust – 'The Mrs Smith Trust', under the patronage of Cornelia Stuyvesant Vanderbilt – offered to increase his salary, and provide facilities to maintain and store the Collection at Netherne. This request was turned down by the hospital authorities, saying Adamson's salary would then "exceed that of the doctors" (as documented in correspondence in the Edward Adamson Archive at the Wellcome Library). Adamson was obliged to make up the financial difference himself, and so he kept art therapy alive until it was later officially recognised by the NHS, and prevented it from being subsumed under Occupational Therapy. The emerging field of art therapy was thereby protected by means of Adamson's professional and financial efforts.

He was involved from the late 1940s in the discussions and working groups that eventually led to the British Association of Art Therapists (BAAT) in 1964, of which he was a founder member and, briefly, its first chair. From 1969 and through the early 1970s, he was Head of the first British Art Therapy training programme, at St. Albans School of Art (the School was later renamed the Hertfordshire College of Art and Design, and then amalgamated with the University of Hertfordshire in 1992: art therapy training continuing in the university's School of Creative Arts, and still generally known as the St Albans' course).

== First Move: After Netherne, Ashton. 'Art as Healing' and Outsider Art (1981–1996) ==
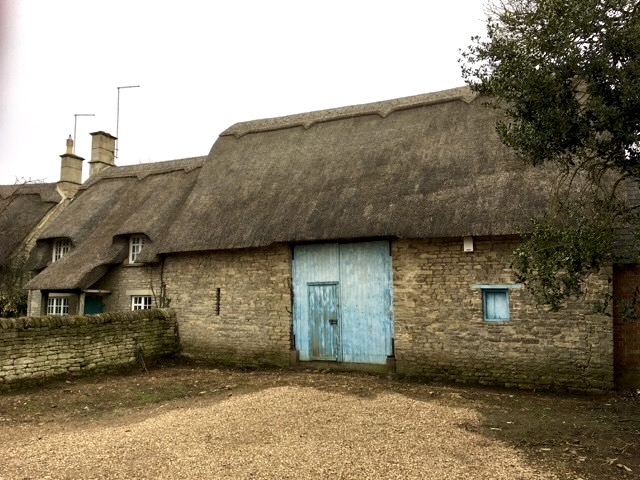
Adamson Collection at Ashton barn

After his retirement, Adamson opened a gallery on Miriam Rothschild (1908–2005)'s Ashton Wold estate in 1983, where the Adamson Collection was held until 1997. Rothschild was a friend and supporter of Adamson and Timlin, and a Trustee and subsequently Patron of the Adamson Collection Trust. The Adamson Collection Trust had been established in 1978 to promote research into Art Therapy, Adamson's work and the Collection. Adamson was the Collection's Curator until his death. Timlin was chair from 1997 to 2004, and David O'Flynn (b. 1960), a psychiatrist at Lambeth Hospital (a Trustee since 1997) was chair from July 2004 to August 2024. The writer and artist Rose Ruane (b. 1977) was elected chair on 6 August 2024.

In 1984, Adamson and Timlin published their book on Adamson's work and the Collection, "Art as Healing", with the introduction by the psychiatrist and Jungian analyst Anthony Stevens, and with images of 116 objects and the personal stories behind them (including a chapter on the Apple pictures that brought Adamson and Timlin together). It was published in the UK and USA, and reprinted in 1990. "Art as Healing" won the UK mental health charity Mind's 'Book Of The Year Award' in 1985. Though Adamson eschewed affiliation with psychological ideologies or organisations, "Art as Healing" has a Jungian spirit.

He and Timlin had been regular visitors to Withymead, the Jungian art community led by Irene and Gilbert Champernowne from its founding in 1942 to its closure in 1967; and later to Stanton, where Irene Champernowne and some of the Withymead staff moved after Withymead's demise with the intention of continuing with their work. Timlin had a cottage in Stanton, where he and Adamson would be most weekends. They were friends and associates with the group of British Jungians who are known as the 'Zurich classical school', as they were almost all trained at the C. G. Jung Institute in Zürich, and emphasised archetypal imagery and its amplification, rather than transference, object relations and early child development. In 1982, they split from their colleagues to establish the Independent Group of Analytical Psychologists (IGAP). Both Timlin and O'Flynn analysed with members of this group: Timlin with Anthony Stevens (b. 1933) and Molly Tuby (1917–2011); O'Flynn with Michael Edwards (1930–2010), an influential art therapist, a friend of Adamson and Timlin, on the staff at Withymead and Stanton, and a founder member of the BAAT in 1964 and its chairman from 1971 to 75.

Adamson's importance in the history of British art therapy is widely accepted. However, his point of view differed from art therapists who were psychoanalytically oriented, and in later life, he seemed more at home with those interested in outsider art, the spontaneous creations of untrained artists. He was a close friend of Rebecca Alban Hoffberger, and involved as she created the American Visionary Arts Museum (AVAM) in Baltimore. Hoffberger came to London to meet Adamson after reading 'Art as Healing'. Adamson and Timlin attended AVAM's inauguration in 1995, and donated Kurelek's "Where am I? Who Am I? Why Am I?", Timlin's Apple pictures, along with other works to the museum. Hoffberger describes Adamson as 'renowned for his gentle nature as the British Buddha' in the celebratory catalogue. In 1996, after Adamson's death, Timlin gave Adamson's library to AVAM.

== Deaths of Edward Adamson and John Timlin ==
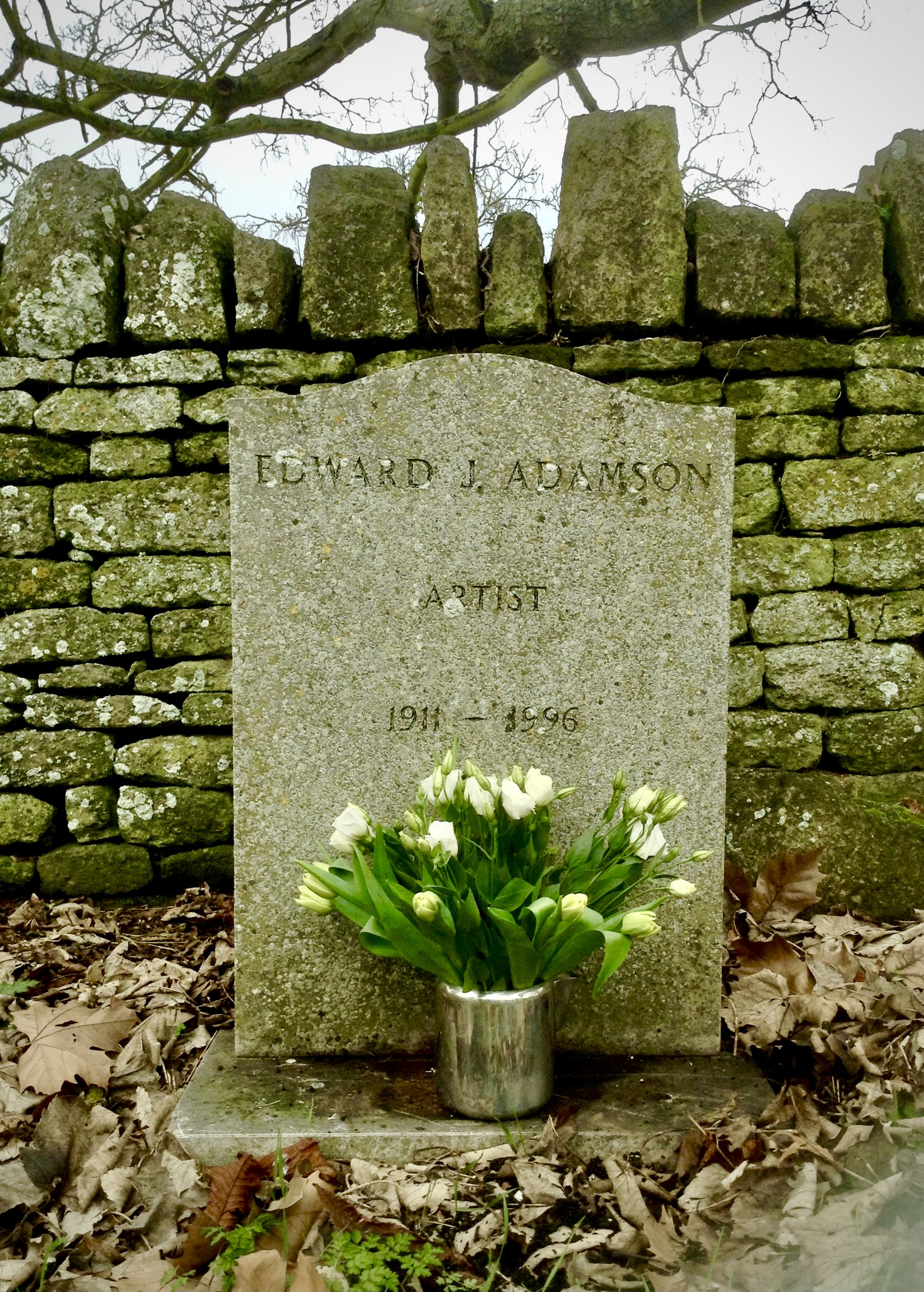
Edward Adamson interred at Ashton Chapel

In November 1995 Adamson was advised privately that he was to be awarded the MBE for his services to mental health but he died before this was formally bestowed upon him..

He died at his London home, the Studios, Hollywood Road in West Brompton, on 3 February 1996, aged 84. His ashes were interred at the Ashton Chapel (c 1706) on the Ashton Wold estate.

His obituary was published in the New York Times on 10 February 1996 at 'Edward Adamson, 84, Therapist Who Used Art to Aid Mentally Ill'

John Timlin died on 11 September 2020, also at the Hollywood Road Studios, aged 90 yrs. His obituary was published in Raw Vision at Adamson Collection archives

== The Adamson Collection First Move: Ashton ==
The Adamson Collection is a body of work of international and historical importance, which has been exhibited nationally and internationally, and received wide media coverage. Adamson showed the Collection as early as 1947 in group shows of - to use a term from the time - 'psychiatric art'. In 1950, the "International Exhibition of Psychopathological Art" of '2000 works by 63 people from 17 countries' - including several paintings from the first Adamson studio - was held at the Sainte-Anne Hospital in Paris, during the First World Congress of Psychiatry, and 'helped create a climate of acceptance for work of the mentally ill' (p67).

Works were included in three influential exhibitions held 'to promote the public awareness of art therapy' between 1955 and 1968. The sub-titles of all these three surveys - particularly 1968's - speak of the attitudes of the time

The first two were at the Institute of Contemporary Arts:

* in 1955, "Aspects of Schizophrenic Art: an exhibition of work by patients in mental hospitals", with 27 out of the 94 paintings shown from the Adamson Collection, curated by the psychiatrist G.M. Carstairs, and the catalogue introduction by the art critic Herbert Read, who had founded and led the ICA with Roland Penrose: the two were the leading proponents of Surrealism in the UK;

* in 1964, "Art as Communication: an exhibition of paintings made in art therapy departments of psychiatric hospitals and clinics";

* in 1968, at the Commonwealth Institute: "Art and Mental Health: an exhibition of paintings, clay models and ceramics by psychiatric and subnormal patients and maladjusted children".

When Adamson retired from Netherne in 1981, he estimated there were 100,000 objects - paintings, drawings, sculptures and ceramics - in the Collection. The Netherne gallery had been opened in 1956, and was being visited by 3500 people a year by 1981, when it was closed on Adamson's retirement. Among them was Hazel Guggenheim (1903–1995), Peggy Guggenheim's sister. Timlin recalls

"Hazel was immaculately dressed and met the patients. She wore some fashionable red satin and diamanté, high heel shoes which a patient admired. Hazel sent them to Edward after her visit to present to the patient".

"The Tear", anonymous, acrylic on canvas. Adamson Collection - Wellcome Collection.

In 1981 about 6000 of the objects, by over a hundred people, were taken to Ashton Wold (with a further 150 added after his retirement as he continued to see people at the Hollywood Road studio until 1995). They were chosen by Adamson and Rudolf Freudenberg (1908–1993), psychiatrist and Medical Superintendent at Netherne after Dax left, for "both artistic and psychiatric interest". The Ashton gallery opened to the public in 1983. When Adamson and Timlin returned to Netherne later to move the rest of the Collection, it had disappeared, probably destroyed as considered by the hospital authorities to be of no value. A Police investigation never established their fate. In 1984, when the Adamson Collection was exhibited as "Selections from the Edward Adamson Collection", at Art Gallery of Ontario, Adamson donated a large pencil drawing by Kurelek of one of the interiors of Netherne Hospital showing a group of patients at leisure to the Ontario Psychiatric Association, to decorate their common room - a donation facilitated by a psychiatrist, Dr. Appleton.

== Second Move: After Ashton, Lambeth ==
After Adamson's death in 1996, the Adamson Collection was moved for a second time, to Lambeth Hospital, an inner London mental health unit, part of South London and Maudsley NHS Foundation Trust (SLaM), on permanent loan by the Adamson Collection Trust. The Collection was curated by the hospital Art Therapist, Alice Jackson, until 2012. In 2000 SLaM named a new mental health unit at St Thomas' Hospital as the Adamson Centre for Mental Health as a tribute to his pioneering work. Timlin donated 50 ink portraits by Adamson of people at work in the Netherne shower room, which he drew after one of the people in the session asked Adamson why wasn't he also drawing. (There are many more of these at the Wellcome Library Adamson Archive).

Since 1997, around 300 paintings have hung in corridors in Lambeth Hospital, the Adamson Centre for Mental Health (since it opened in 2000), and a SLaM community base. The rest of the paintings and drawings were stored either in a disused shower room (seemingly fitting as Adamson's first working space was in a shower room at Netherne), or stacked, unframed, in cardboard folders on shelves in a working team office at Lambeth Hospital, with the two Kureleks wrapped in blankets under a desk.

Between 2007 and 2010, the Adamson Collection Trust employed then Curator, Alice Jackson, to undertake the Herculean task of cataloguing all the unframed paintings and drawings: they number about 2500 by Polanska - most are preparatory sketches for the "Stations of the Cross" - and another 2500 by over 200 people, more than half of them women. Adamson's records from Ashton, including albums of press cuttings and coverage, and of examples of Buday's Christmas cards and other prints, were in a filing cabinet.

Almost all the collection of several hundred stones, flints, ceramics and other small sculptures are in the third Adamson gallery (after the first and second at Netherne and Ashton), a small room outside a mental health ward. The objects were created with the cheapest materials – for example, almost all the paintings are poster paint on wallpaper backing paper - and date from 1946, so need specialist conservation and storage. Polonsky's masterpiece "Stations of the Cross" and two other larger Polonsky pieces were in a former Trustee's garage in Edinburgh - Michael Freudenberg, Rudolf Freudenberg's son - and very fragile and at risk as they are still the original plaster casts. Freudenberg was also storing a number of paintings and drawings. Almost all Adamson's personal papers, photographs and other artefacts, including hundreds of photographic transparencies of works (including of many now lost) were at the Adamson's Hollywood Road studio, where Timlin still lives. Adamson Collection Trust records were in Trustees' homes across the country. Adamson's library of books and journals has been secured at AVAM since 1996.

The Adamson Centre closed in November 2016, due to service changes. The 50 ink drawings by Adamson passed to ACT to be returned to Art Therapies, South London and Maudsley NHS Trust in 2024

== Third Move: 'Adamson Collections in five locations' - Adamson Collection / Wellcome Collection ==
Since January 2010, the Adamson Collection Trust focused on identifying and securing all and any objects, archive or other material related to Adamson, the Adamson Collection and the Adamson Collection Trust. Henry Boxer, a leading international authority on and dealer in outsider art, has been a key adviser and supporter since 2010. At that time there was no inventory or catalogue, not even of the objects moved to SLaM from Ashton, and all the material was at risk. After three decades of effort since the move from Netherne, funding to save the Collection as a whole was never found.

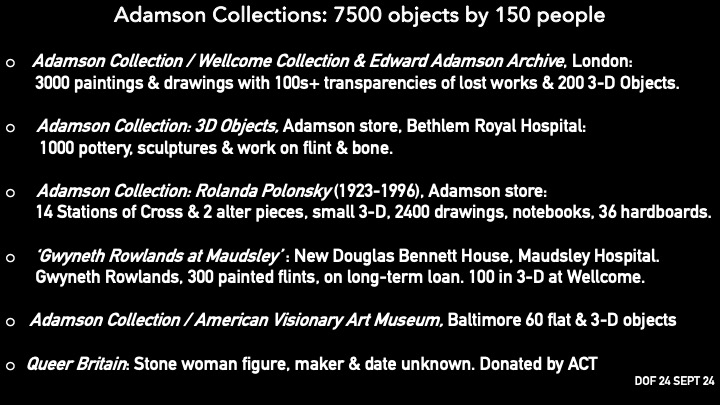
Adamson Collection locations, 2025

Since 2010, the Trust has been collaborating with the Wellcome Library to secure the archives, and the Collection - in need of rescue for the third time in its history. In 2010–11, the Wellcome Library accepted Timlin's donation of Adamson's archive from Hollywood Road. In July 2013, the Wellcome took Adamson's Ashton archive (1981–1996); and further archive material from Lambeth Hospital. The Wellcome Library at the same time relocated all the 3000 paintings and drawings from Lambeth Hospital to temporary storage in their 'stacks' under Euston Road - completed after two further transfers from mental health community settings in Lambeth in 2016. The transfer deed was signed in December 2015 for all the flat works (bar Polonsky's drawings and one Kurelek canvas). These are now known as "Adamson Collection - Wellcome Collection".

In 2017 Wellcome Collection undertook a re-evaluation of its policy towards its handling of the Adamson Collection. A series of public consultations in July 2017 explored the complex ethical issues surrounding questions of copyright ownership, attribution and terminology.

In 2024 for the Adamson Collection/Wellcome Collection with completed transfer of a number of 3D objects from the ACT collection of 1000 painted found objects by Gwyneth Rowlands and 250 pieces by other makers. By the end of 2024 300 Gwyneth Rowlands' painted flints will be on long-term loan to the new building at Maudsley Hospital, New Douglas Bennett House.

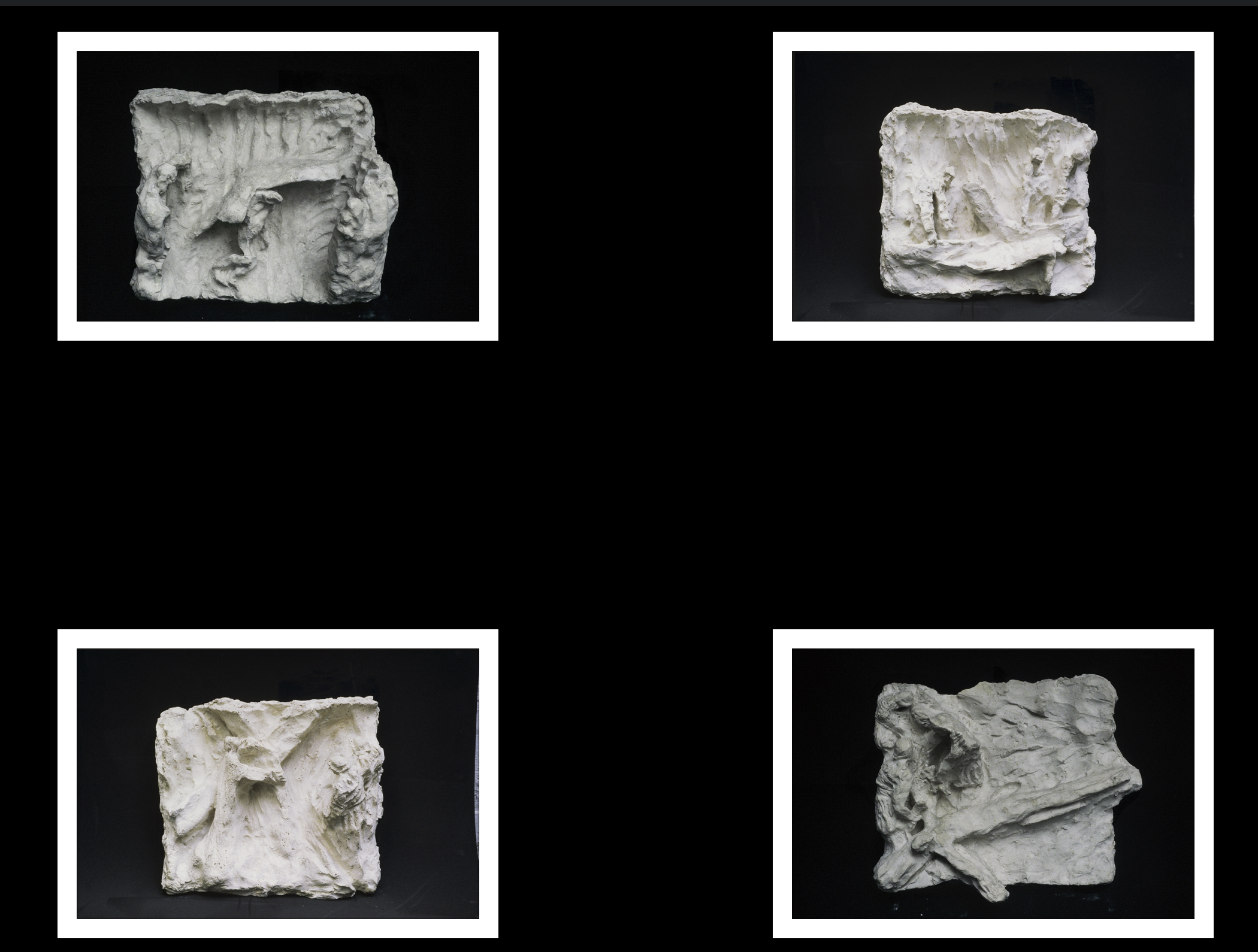
Rolanda Polonsky, 4 of 14 'Stations of the Cross'. Late 1960s, original hand worked clay. 55 by 75 by 20. With Adamson Collection Trust. Copyright the artist family. Used with permission

Alongside about 500 small 3-D objects, the work completed at Netherne by the Italian born sculptor, artist and poet Rolanda Polonsky between probably 1948 to 1982 is at the Adamson store at the old Bethlehem museum. It comprises 2250 drawings, 36 paintings on hardboard and 16 piece stations of the cross in handworked original plaster maquettes

The remaining 2500 drawings are by Rolanda Polonska - many studies are for her 'Stations of the Cross' - and are located at the Wellcome. ACT holds about 500 sculptures at Lambeth Hospital, including the oeuvre of Gwyneth Rowlands. Six of her painted flints are on long-term loan to the Wellcome Reading Room. Kurelek's ' 'The Ball of Twine and Other Nonsense' is on permanent loan to the Museum of the Mind (Museum of the Mind). AVAM have about 50 objects that Adamson donated in 1995.

The Adamson Collection Trust notes there are probably about twenty pictures and tapestries Dax took from the Netherne research studio to Melbourne to start the Dax Collection (now at the Dax Centre).

== Ideas about art and mental health ==
Adamson saw people psychologically recovering – 'healing', in his terms – by means of expressing themselves through art. The act of creating was what mattered to Adamson, who felt the artist or therapist should avoid influencing, distorting, or impinging upon self-expression. Adamson encouraged 'free expression' by letting people come to paint or sculpt without comment or judgement, and with only minimal technical assistance. If the creator talked about a work, he'd listen. He abhorred psychological interpretation, which he dismissed as 'the therapist's own projections' onto the work, and maintained that only the creator could explain their own work. This is the essence of his 'non-interventionist' working style, which perhaps would not be recognized as part of contemporary art therapy practice.

Gwyneth Rowlands, "Untitled", watercolour, Indian ink and varnish on flint. Adamson Collection Trust

"The actual "therapy" is purely incidental. The important thing is the art! You see, it's therapeutic for patients to walk across the hospital grounds to get to the studio. If they're going to sit in a group of patients, it's therapeutic. But the great thing is the actual art they are producing: that's the thing that is getting them better. The mere fact that they put their brush to paper and try and paint".

He saw himself an artist, "somewhere in between" the clinical staff and the patients, and the space where he worked as an art studio. He thought only artists should work with art as therapy.

"In his later years Mr. Adamson was critical of a movement to train as art therapists people whose background was more in the field of psychology than art – 'Can't the psychologist remain a psychologist and not try and take art over?' he asked in the 1987 interview".

"The important thing is know about art, to know how to draw and paint, so that you can encourage from that angle the whole time... The patients appeal to you as an artist, knowing that you can paint, knowing you are ready to help them through art – not with all that knowledge of psychology. That's something completely different".

Adamson exhibited work from the Collection from 1947 on, and internationally until his death in 1996. He believed the exhibiting of the Collection educated the public about the creativity and humanity of those diagnosed with mental disorders. "Adamson was an educator, who saw the socio-cultural intervention of showing these people's works to the public who had excluded them - and showing it as an important contribution to their culture - as a way to change public opinion".

There is debate about whether these objects should be exhibited, and/or creators named: questions about intention, capacity, consent, confidentiality and ownership; about if these works are clinical records or can they be outsider art, or be both; and about the notion that should these people – excluded, voiceless and nameless in their lifetime – have their creations hidden, their art forgotten, and their identity again denied.

== Writings by Edward Adamson (selected) ==
At Edward Adamson Archive, Wellcome Collection, London.

- 1984: "Art as Healing". Coventure, London Open assess at Wellcome Collection and Adamson Collection references;
- 1970: "Art for Mental Health", in 'Jean Creedy (ed): Social Context of Art'. Tavistock, London;
- 1968: "Art and Mental Health", in the exhibition catalogue, the Commonwealth Institute, London;
- 1965: "Review of artistic self expression in mental disease: the shattered image of schizophrenics", in 'Mental Health', the Journal of the National Association for Mental Health (Mind). December, 272–274;
- 1963: "Art and mental health", in 'Mental Health', the Journal of the National Association for Mental Health (Mind). Vol. 22, No.2;
- 1962: "Darkness into Light" in 'The Observer', 17 June.

== Adamson across media ==
=== Documentary ===
- 2019. Art & Mind. Directed, written & edited: Amélie Ravalec. Consultant: Mike Jay & David O'Flynn. Art & Mind;
- 2014. "Abandoned Goods". Dir: Pia Borg & Edward Lawrenson. Prod: Kate Ogborn & Lisa Marie Russo. Consultant: David O'Flynn. Fly Film ;

=== Radio ===
- 2020. "Naming the Orphans". 'A poetic audio response to Adamson Collection'. RADIOPHRENIA, Glasgow. Broadcast 16 Nov 3.30-4pm. Artist and writer Rose Ruane with David 0'Flynn & Suzie 'the Clown' Ferguson. Soundcloud link
- 2015. "Object spotlight: Gwyneth Rowlands, 'woman's head" in Medicine in Music. 'Gryff Rhys Jones and Simon Chaplin discuss a work of art on a piece of flint'. BBC3 Broadcast 22 September: BBC Sounds link

=== Videos & on-line / recorded events ===
At Edward Adamson Archive, Wellcome Collection, London. Edward Adamson Archive

- 1971: "Rolanda Polonsky, Sculptor", (10mins): Arts Council film, dir: Lionel Miskin. Polonska filmed in her 25th year at Netherne, talking about her beliefs and works, most of which are in the Collection: https://player.bfi.org.uk/free/film/watch-rolanda-polonsky-sculptor-1971-online;
- 1984: "Link", (20mins): video of Central TV interview with Adamson and Timlin, at Ashton Gallery and in Miriam Rothschild's wildflower garden, by Rosalie Wilkins & Bradley Borum. In connection with 1984 Marlborough Gallery exhibition and launch of 'Art as Healing';
- 1989: "Night Network", (11mins): video of TV studio interview with Adamson about his working, with particular reference to the 'Metamorphosis' series of paintings;
- 1990: "Art was my salvation": Michele Staniland, (10mins): filmic essay of spaintings with music and intertitles from 'Art as Healing';
- 1991: "Look East", (3mins 30secs): video of TV interview with Adamson at Ashton;
- 1994: "Visit to Ashton by Cambridge Jungian Circle", (50mins). Video by unknown visitor. Comprehensive tour of Ashton Gallery;
- 2020: ::'Monochromatic Minds: Lines of Revelation' exhibition. Talk about Gwyneth Rowlands by David O'Flynn and Rose Ruane with Jennifer Gilbert: at https://vimeo.com/441992680;
- 2023: "Art making &the Adamson Collection at Netherne Hospital". Rose Ruane. Art making and the Adamson Collection;
- 2023: "Talk on Adamson Collection artist known as JJ Beegan by Prof. Clair Wills". TULCA Festival of Visual Arts, Galway. https://www.tulca.ie/events/2023/11/17-1..

== Exhibitions of the Adamson Collection (selected) ==
- 1947: Kingston Town Hall;
- 1950: "International Exhibition of Psychopathological Art" at the First International Congress of Psychiatry, Paris;
- 1955: "Aspects of Schizophrenic Art: an exhibition of work by patients in mental hospitals", Institute of Contemporary Arts, London;
- 1961: Royal Society of Medicine;
- 1964: "Art as Communication: an exhibition of paintings made in art therapy departments of psychiatric hospitals and clinics", Institute of Contemporary Arts, London;
- 1967: "Fifth International Congress of Psychopathology of Expression", Paris. International Society for Psychopathological Art (SIPE);
- 1968: "Art and Mental Health: an exhibition of paintings, clay models and ceramics by psychiatric and subnormal patients and maladjusted children", The Commonwealth Institute, London
- 1969: House of Commons;
- 1974: University of Cairo;
- 1984: "Selections from the Edward Adamson Collection", Art Gallery of Ontario;

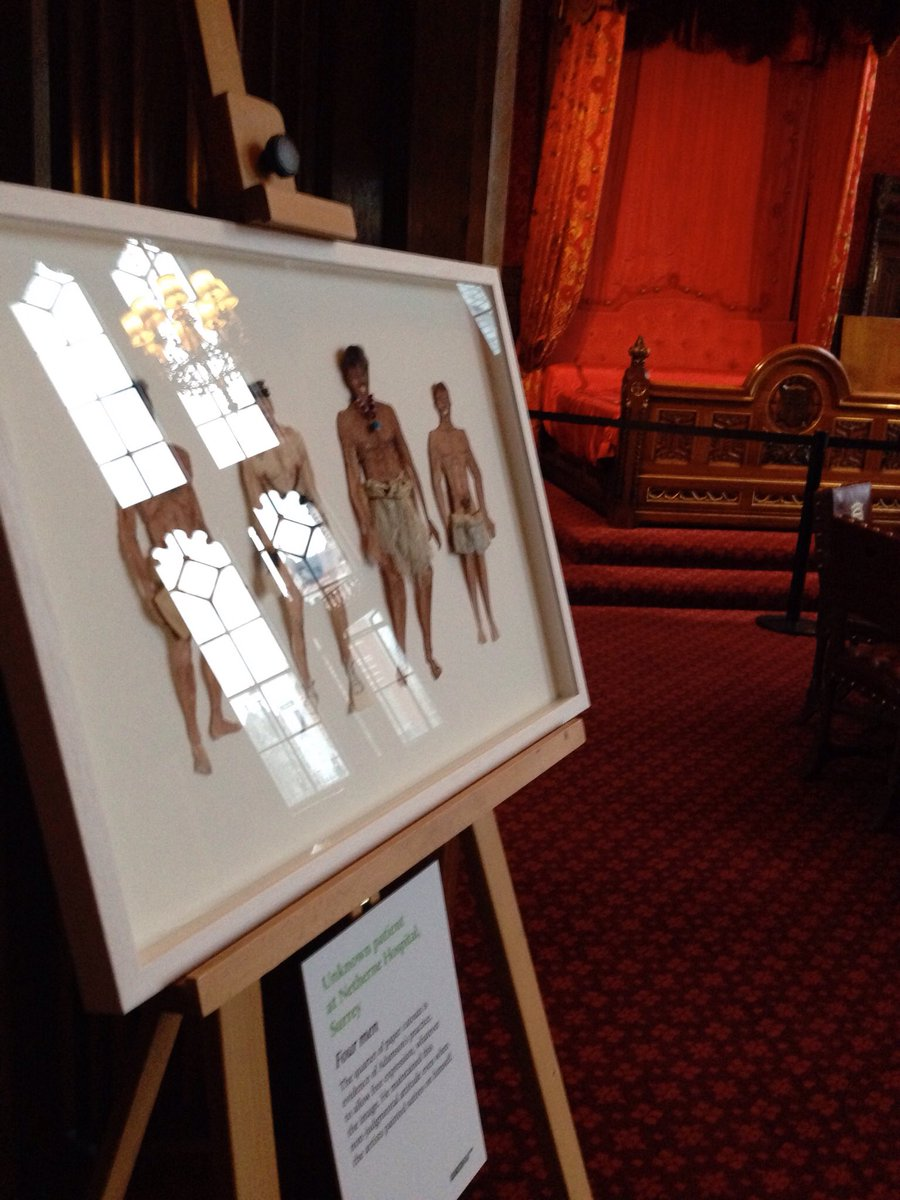
"Four figures". Installation view, 'Art as Healing' 2015" "Art as healing: an event showcasing the Adamson Collection", State Rooms, Speaker's House

- 1984: Marlborough Gallery, London;
- 1991: Kfar Saba Cultural Centre, Jerusalem, Israel;
- 1995: "The Tree of Life: The Inaugural Exhibition of the American Visionary Arts Museum". Baltimore;
- 1997: Lambeth Hospital. Opened by Jo Brand;
- 2004: Mexico Gallery, London;
- 2012: Glaziers Hall, London. Slideshow of 120 Collection objects, and short promo of "Abandoned Goods" (see Filmography, above). SLaM Annual Public Meeting, 11 September;
- 2013: "Art in the Asylum". Group survey of asylum art. Djanogly Art Gallery, Nottingham
- 2013-14: "Raw Vision: 25 ans d'Art Brut". JJ Beegan drawings in a major international survey of art brut. Halle St Pierre, Paris
- 2014: "Edward Adamson Festival 2014" at the Long Gallery and ORTUS, Maudsley Hospital; and at Bethlem Gallery and Bethlem Museum, UK
- 2015" "Art as healing: an event showcasing the Adamson Collection", State Rooms, Speaker's House, House of Commons, London
- 2015: "Art as Healing", Feb - Mar. At Stash Gallery, London, E1
- 2015: "The Ball of Twine and Other Nonsense", William Kurelek, c 1956. Permanent loan to Bethlem Museum of the Mind
- 2015-25: Gwyneth Rowlands: Six "Paintings on Flints". On loan to Reading Room, Wellcome Collection;
- 2016-17: "Bedlam: the asylum and beyond". Abandoned Goods and JJ Beegan drawing at major survey. Wellcome Collection.
- 2017: "Mr A Moves in Mysterious Ways". Selected artists from the Adamson Collection, Peltz Gallery, Birkbeck School of Art.
- 2020: Gwyneth Rowlands: Four "Paintings on Flints" in "Monochromatic Minds: Lines of Revelation". 25 Feb – 4 Mar. Candid Arts Centre, London EC1.

== Articles & papers on Adamson and Adamson Collection from 2011 ==
- 2011: O'Flynn, D. "Art as Healing: Edward Adamson". Raw Vision, 72, Spring, p46-53.;
- 2013: O'Flynn, D. "Edward Adamson: art as healing". In Michaela Ross (ed) "Bethlem Papers 1: On the Inside of Outsider Art". Bethlem Gallery, UK.;
- 2015 Ostrowska, A. "'The Adamson Collection: illustrations of mental illness or a testament to spontaneous artistic expression?'". Journal of Visual Communication in Medicine, 38(3–4): 196–202;
- 2015. O'Flynn, D. "Almost Certainly, the Catalogue Rasionné of the Creator(s?) Known as JJ Beegan" Raw Vision, 88, Winter, p22-29;
- 2016: O'Flynn, D. "Private Intentions: The story behind the Adamson Collection". Ladybeard Magazine, "Mind Issue";
- 2016: Gander, K. "Healing with paint: How the pioneer of art therapy helped millions of mental health patients". Independent newspaper, 7 September. Open access: Independent;
- 2018: O'Flynn, D, Szekir-Papasavva, S & Trainor, C. " Art, power, and the asylum: Adamson, healing, and the Collection ". Lancet Psychiatry, 5,5,396-399. doi.org/10.1016/S2215-0366(18)30147-0. Open access: Lancet Psychiatry
- 2018: O'Flynn, D & Trainor, C. "Myth, Metaphor or Metamorphosis? Ron Hampshire and the Adamson Collection. '"Newsbriefing (Winter 2018), British Association of Art Therapists.;
- 2019: O'Flynn, D. " Edward Adamson and the history of art therapy ". Mental Health Nursing, April/May, p16-17.;
- 2019: O'Flynn, D & Schupbach, W. "The art of those with lived experience: excavating the Adamson Collection". Journal of European Association of Health Information & Libraries, Vol. 15 (4): 23-28. [DOI: https://doi.org/10.32384/jeahil15354];
- 2020: O'Flynn, D & Ruane, R. "Our Lady of the Flints": monograph on Gwyneth Rowlands. Raw Vision, 106, Summer, p12-19.;
- 2021: Wills, C. "Life Pushed Aside: Clair Wills on Netherne Hospital". London Review of Books, Vol. 43 No. 22 · 18 November 2021. LRB;
- 2023: Ruane, R. "Mary Bishop and the surveillant gaze". Wellcome Collection Wellcome Collection blog;
- 2023: Ruane, R & O'Flynn, D. "Trying to Draw Myself": monograph on Mary Bishop. Raw Vision, 113, Winter 2022/23, p20-27.
