= Eric Cunningham Dax =

British psychiatrist

Dr Eric Cunningham Dax AO
- Born: 18 May 1908; United Kingdom
- Died: 29 January 2008 (aged 99); Melbourne, Australia
- Occupation: Psychiatrist

Eric Cunningham Dax AO (18 May 1908 – 29 January 2008) was a British-born Australian psychiatrist.

== Career ==
In England during the 1930s and 1940s, Dax worked with John Rawlings Rees, Francis Reitmann and other biological psychiatrists who advocated the use of somatic (physical) treatments for patients with mental problems. He contributed to the development of chemical shock, electroconvulsive therapy, and lobotomy while working at Netherne Hospital, Coulsdon, and continued to use lobotomy in Australia.

"Modified leucotomy was introduced into Victoria by Dr. Cunningham Dax .. By the end of 1959, 300 patients had had leucotomies.. but in the years immediately following [this] was reduced to a mere trickle, 23 in 1960, 6 in 1961. .. [even by the dubious scientific standards of self assessment by the people doing this treatment] 1955 was a 'bad' year with 38% failures, and 1958 .. was even less favourable with 45% failures." Overall 32% were rated "no improvement or had deteriorated further", [a typical psychiatric tactic to include two categories for "marked" and "moderate" improvement and just one for the rest, which included deaths]. Only 1% died immediately as a result of the operation but a total of 31 people, 10%, were dead from various causes when their cases were reviewed.

Between 1946 and 1951—when Dax was the Medical Superintendent of Netherne Hospital—he and Reitmann, continuing the 1930s research into art and psychosis at the Maudsley Hospital, pioneered the use of art as part of mainstream psychiatric treatment. Their interest was to research using art both for treatment and for assisting the diagnosis of mental disorder. Dax employed the artist Edward Adamson to facilitate a research art studio at Netherne, and 689 of the people compelled to live at Netherne painted with Adamson in this period, according to Robertson. Dax published his findings in 1953 in his "Experimental Studies in Psychiatric Art". He began a collection of artworks produced by psychiatric patients, taking about 20 objects from Netherne when he went to Melbourne, including paintings from the research art studio and tapestries made in occupational therapy. The Cunningham Dax Collection became one of the largest collections of its type in the world. The Collection can be viewed at the Dax Centre, located in Parkville, Victoria. The Centre runs public education programs and seeks to promote mental health and wellbeing by fostering a greater understanding of the mind, mental illness and trauma through art and creativity.

Adamson carried on the studio for 35 years, and is one of the pioneers of Art Therapy in Britain, and founded the Adamson Collection, now comprising approximately 6000 paintings, drawings, sculptures and ceramics created at Netherne, and currently almost all re-located to the Wellcome Library in anticipation of a securer future in several international institutions.

== Mental Hygiene Authority of Victoria ==
Dax emigrated to Melbourne, Australia at the end of 1951 to take up an appointment in the new year as founding Chairman of the Mental Hygiene Authority of Victoria (later known as the Mental Health Authority), at a salary of £3,200 a year. The Authority was formed as a response to public concern about the treatment and welfare of psychiatric patients, and particularly as a response to the Kennedy Report of 1950 which highlighted the plight of these patients in Victoria in the immediate post war era. Dax remained in this position until 1968, introducing major reforms of mental health services. These included the moving of psychiatric treatment from asylums to community settings and the introduction of art programs for patients. In 1961, the World Federation for Mental Health sponsored the publication of Dax's book Asylum To Community, which describes the rapid expansion of community psychiatric centres in Australia. In his introduction to this book the Federation's chairman, John Rawlings Rees, praised Dax's Mental Hygiene Authority as 'a major training ground in psychiatry and mental health work for all the English-speaking populations of the South-western Pacific region'. However, abuse of psychiatric patients was still occurring at such institutions as Newhaven Hospital.

As part of his general strategy to expand psychiatric services, the teaching of psychiatry and the education of doctors in psychiatric principles, Dax lobbied for the creation of a chair of Psychiatry at the University of Melbourne; this was achieved in 1963. He supported the establishment of the Parkville Psychiatric Unit as a teaching unit of the University.

Although health services in Australia were funded and administered at state level, Dax advocated federal intervention to co-ordinate and further resource psychiatric services.

== Opposition to Scientology ==
Dax used his position to campaign actively against the Church of Scientology in Australia, in response to that Church's criticism of the practices of shock therapy and psychosurgery. In 1962 he wrote to the Minister of Health in each Australian state, warning of what he considered to be the dangers of this new religion.

When the Government of Victoria convened a Board of Inquiry into Scientology in 1964, in addition to appearing as an expert witness, Dax conferred with other medical witnesses regarding their evidence. He also instructed one of his staff, Dr. M.B. Macmillan, to recruit and co-ordinate other expert witnesses appearing before the Board.

== Later career ==
From 1969 to 1978 Dax was Community Health Services Co-ordinator in the Mental Health Services Commission, Tasmania.

On retirement he returned to Victoria and became a Senior Associate in medical history at the University of Melbourne. However, he continued to provide diagnoses and recommendations for Tasmanian patients including in 1984 Martin Bryant, who went on to commit the Port Arthur massacre in 1996. Dax was admitted to the degree of Doctor of Medicine honoris causa at the university on 15 December 1984, and remained a Senior Fellow in Psychiatry at the Royal Melbourne Hospital.

Dax was appointed an Officer of the Order of Australia in 1985 in recognition of his service to medicine, particularly in the fields of psychiatry and mental health.

== Published works ==
- Dax, E. C. (1947). Modern Mental Treatment: a handbook for nurses. London: Faber.
- A comprehensive list of Cunningham Dax's publications
