= Rebecca Alban Hoffberger =

American museum director (born 1952)

- Born: September 25, 1952 (age 74); Baltimore, Maryland
- Occupations: Non-profit Consultant, Author, and Founder, Principal curator, Museum director emeritus of American Visionary Art Museum.
- Organization(s): American Visionary Art Museum, Sinai Hospital

Rebecca Alban Hoffberger (born September 25, 1952) is the founder, primary curator, and director emeritus of the American Visionary Art Museum, located in Baltimore, Maryland.

== Biography ==
Rebecca Alban Hoffberger was born in a suburb of Baltimore, Maryland, to Allen, a mechanical engineer, and Peggy Alban, a homemaker.

Hoffberger is the founder and director emeritus (October 2022) of the American Visionary Art Museum (AVAM). She was accepted into college at age 15, though chose instead the personal invitation of internationally renowned mime Marcel Marceau, to become his first American apprentice in Paris. By 19, Hoffberger had co-founded her own ballet company and by 21, was a sought-after consultant to a broad spectrum of nonprofits, including research and development scientific companies. At 25, Hoffberger was awarded the title of “Dame” for her work to establish medical field hospitals in Nigeria. She studied alternative and folk medicine in Mexico. Returning to the States, Hoffberger served on the Board of the Elisabeth Kubler-Ross Center in Virginia and worked as Development Director at the Sinai Hospital’s Department of Psychiatry for People Encouraging People, where she first conceived the visionary museum/education center.

== Development of the museum ==
After working with patients at Sinai Hospital’s “People Encouraging People” program, Hoffberger became focused on developing her idea of a "visionary museum”—a facility that would specialize in showcasing the work of self-taught, "visionary" artists, and serve as an education center that emphasized intuitive, creative invention. While developing the idea for the museum, Hoffberger visited Jean Dubuffet’s Collection de l’Art Brut in Lausanne, Switzerland, accompanied by her future husband, LeRoy E. Hoffberger, who eventually became the museum co-founder. During this visit, Rebecca was greatly impressed by Dubuffet’s use of "non art-speak," along with personal artist bios that emphasized the simple facts of the artists' lives, their creative visions, and the use of the artist’s own words. Upon returning to Baltimore, Hoffberger collaborated with the George Ciscle Gallery in Baltimore to mount two successful shows, the first of which featured matchstick artist Gerald Hawkes.

In February 1989, the American Visionary Art Museum was incorporated as a 501(c)3 non-profit organization. The City of Baltimore offered the organization exclusive development rights on the property located at 800 Key Highway—formerly the 1913 offices to the Baltimore Copper Paint Company and an adjacent historic whiskey warehouse—contingent on design, neighborhood approval and obtaining full project funding. Hoffberger began fundraising efforts and received an initial $250,000 planning grant from USF&G, soon followed by a cumulative $2.4 million challenge grant from the Zanvyl & Isabelle Krieger Foundation, matched by many generous private and public grants, along with $1.3 million in bonds issued by The State of Maryland to finance the construction. Otto Billig, M.D. and Edward Adamson (the first proponent of art therapy in Britain) each gifted their important research archives and library collections to AVAM (Billig gifted the museum 400 pieces of art created by mental patients). This same year, Rebecca and LeRoy Hoffberger were married. In 1992, additional contributions for the museum came from The Body Shop founder Anita Roddick and Gordon Roddick. In 1995, LeRoy sold items from his collection of German Expressionist art via Christie’s to fund the museum.

On November 24, 1995, the American Visionary Art Museum opened to the public. In her inaugural address, Hoffberger stated that “...the American Visionary Art Museum opens its doors of perception not in an effort to make war on academic or institutionalized learning, but to create a place where the best of self-taught, intuitive contributions of all kinds will be duly recognized, explored, and then championed in a clear strong voice."

== Museum exhibits ==
Hoffberger selected the theme of all exhibits for the museum's first 27 years. She collaborated with selected guest curators, and served as sole or principal curator for the majority of AVAM’s 41 original exhibitions. Generating free public educational conferences for each exhibition’s subject, Hoffberger invited speakers including: Archbishop Desmond Tutu, Patch Adams, MD, Dame Anita Roddick, comic Lewis Black, nature philosopher Diane Ackerman, Matt Groening, Julian Bond, His Holiness The Dalai Lama, and Daryl Davis.

== Awards and accolades ==
In 1997, Hoffberger won the Urban Land Institute’s National Award for Excellence, and in 1996, she received the Gold Meir Award from Israel Bonds. In addition to Honorary Doctorates from McDaniel College, Pennsylvania College of Art and Design, Stevenson University, and Maryland Institute College of Art, Hoffberger was awarded the title of “Dame” for her work on behalf of establishing medical field hospitals in Nigeria. She has been the recipient of numerous mental health advocacy and equal opportunity awards and has served as a Director of Jewish Education and on the Board of The Elisabeth Kubler-Ross Center, and has also been a featured speaker at many events, including 2009‘s TEDxMidAtlantic.
