= Adrian Hill =

English painter (1895–1977)

- Born: 24 March 1895; Charlton, London
- Died: 1977 (aged 81–82)
- Education: St John's Wood School of Art; Royal College of Art
- Known for: Painting and writing

Adrian Keith Graham Hill (24 March 1895 – 1977) was a British artist, writer, art therapist, educator, and broadcaster. Hill served with the Honourable Artillery Company during World War I and was the first artist commissioned by the Imperial War Museum to record the conflict on the Western Front. He wrote many books about painting and drawing, and in the 1950s and early 1960s presented a BBC children's television programme called Sketch Club.

== Education ==
Hill was born in Charlton, London, and educated at Dulwich College. He went on to study at the St John's Wood Art School between 1912 and 1914. After his war service Hill studied at the Royal College of Art in 1919 and 1920.

== World War I ==
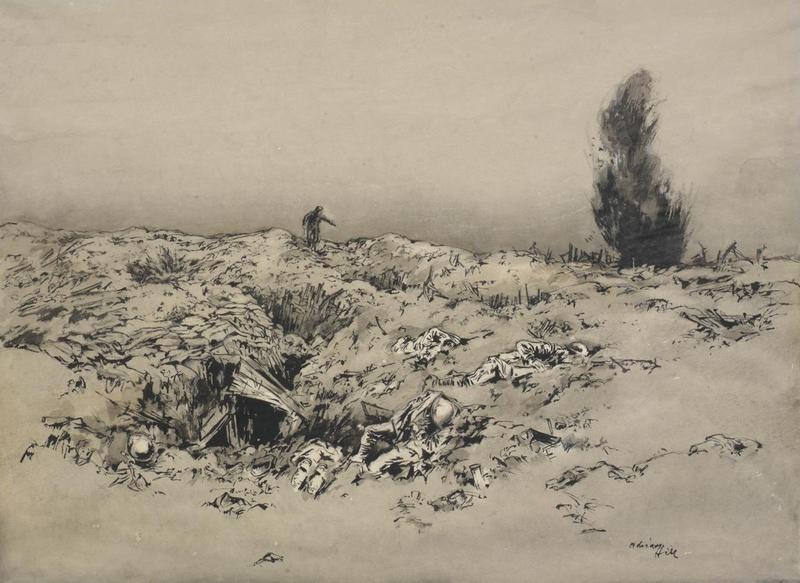
Trenches in Front of Arras - the Runner (Art.IWM ART223)

Ruins Between Bernafay Wood and Maricourt (Art.IWM ART1663)

At the start of World War I, Hill enlisted with the Honourable Artillery Company and, due to his artistic abilities was assigned to a Scouting and Sniping Section. This work often involved operating in front of the Allied trenches to sketch the disposition of the enemy. Later in life, Hill recalled a typical such patrol into no man's land:

"I advanced in short rushes, mostly on my hands and knees with my sketching kit dangling round my neck. As I slowly approached, the wood gradually took a more definite shape, and as I crept nearer I saw that what was hidden from our own line, now revealed itself as a cunningly contrived observation post in one of the battered trees."

In 1917, Hill became the first artist commissioned by the, then newly created, Imperial War Museum to record scenes on the Western Front. Between 1917 and 1919 Hill produced 180 pen-and-ink drawings showing the examples of the devastation in France and Belgium and the work of troops of different nationalities in the trenches. These drawings were highly regarded but the IWM rejected a number of additional paintings submitted by Hill as being outside his brief.

== Later life ==
On returning to civilian life, Hill completed his studies at the Royal College of Art and then painted professionally for a living. Hill also taught at both the Hornsey School of Art and the Westminster School of Art. His own work combined elements of impressionism and surrealism as well as more conventional representations, and was widely displayed at major art galleries during his lifetime, both in Britain and abroad.

In 1938, while convalescing from tuberculosis at the King Edward VII Sanatorium in Midhurst, he passed the time by drawing nearby objects from his hospital bed, and found the process helpful in aiding his own recovery. In 1939, occupational therapy was introduced to the sanatorium for the first time and Hill was invited to teach drawing and painting to other patients - at first to injured soldiers returning from the war, and then to general civilian patients. Hill found that the practice of Art seemed to help to divert the patients and to relieve their mental distress.

Hill believed that art appreciation also aided recovery from illness and was involved, with the British Red Cross Society, in setting up a scheme whereby reproductions of famous artists' works were lent to hospital wards all over the country. Speakers were also engaged - including Hill himself - to talk to patients about the artworks. By 1950 this picture-lending scheme had spread to nearly 200 hospitals, and there was a waiting list.

The artist Edward Adamson joined the programme in 1946 as it was extended to the long-stay mental asylums, and started classes at Netherne Hospital in Surrey. Adamson continued at Netherne for 35 years, and was both a major influence on the British development of art therapy for people with major mental disorders, and also the creator of the Adamson Collection. The Adamson Collection of about 6000 drawings, paintings, ceramics and sculptures by people compelled to live at Netherne was at Lambeth Hospital in South London between 1997 and 2012, and has now being re-located to the Wellcome Library in anticipation of a securer future in several international institutions.

Hill worked tirelessly to promote art therapy, eventually becoming president of the British Association of Art Therapists, founded in 1964, though he found himself at odds with its increasingly psychoanalytical orientation. In 1968 Hill was elected president of the Royal Institute of Oil Painters.

== Ideas about art therapy ==
Hill apparently coined the term "art therapy" in 1942, and in 1945 published his ideas in the book Art Versus Illness. Hill thought that when the patient's physical resistance was at its lowest this somehow rendered the "animal ego" quiescent and allowed the creative powers of the "spiritual essence" to come through in works of art. On recovery, these creative powers would tend to wane back to the "pictorial commonplace." He recognized that war was not only physically destructive but also damaged "minds, bodies and hopes" and that the need for psychological healing was even more important than mere physical repair of "property and estate." He believed that the practice of art, "in sickness and in health," could turn society away from war by making artistic creativity more appreciated. He saw art therapy as becoming an integral part of the National Health Service.

== Books by Adrian Hill (selected) ==
- On the Mastery of Watercolour Painting (Pitman, 1939)
- Art Versus Illness (G. Allen and Unwin, 1945)
- Painting Out Illness (Williams & Norgate, 1951)
- A Book of Trees (Faber and Faber, 1951)
- What Shall We Draw? (Blandford, 1957)
- The Beginner's Book of Oil Painting (Blandford, 1958)
- The Beginner's Book of Watercolour Painting (Blandford, 1959)
- Sketching and Painting Indoors (Blandford, 1961)
- Sketching and Painting Out of Doors (Blandford, 1961)
- How to Draw (MacMillan, 1963)
- How to Paint in Watercolours (Pan Piper, 1967)
- How to Paint Landscapes and Seascapes (Blandford, 1964)
- The Beginner's Book of Drawing and Painting Flowers (Bl
- Drawing and Painting Plants and Flowers (Blandford, 1965)
- Drawing and Painting Architecture in Landscape (Blandford, 1966)
- Further Steps in Oil Painting (Blandford, 1970)
- Further Steps in Drawing and Sketching (Blandford, 1972)
- Drawing and Painting Trees (Blandford, 1977)
- Adrian Hill's Watercolour Painting for Beginners (Cassells, 1994)
- Adrian Hill's Oil Painting for Beginners (Cassells, 1994)
- Beginner's Book of Anatomy (Dover, 2007)
- Drawing and Painting Trees (Dover, 2008)
