= Dax Centre =

Art museum in Melbourne, Australia

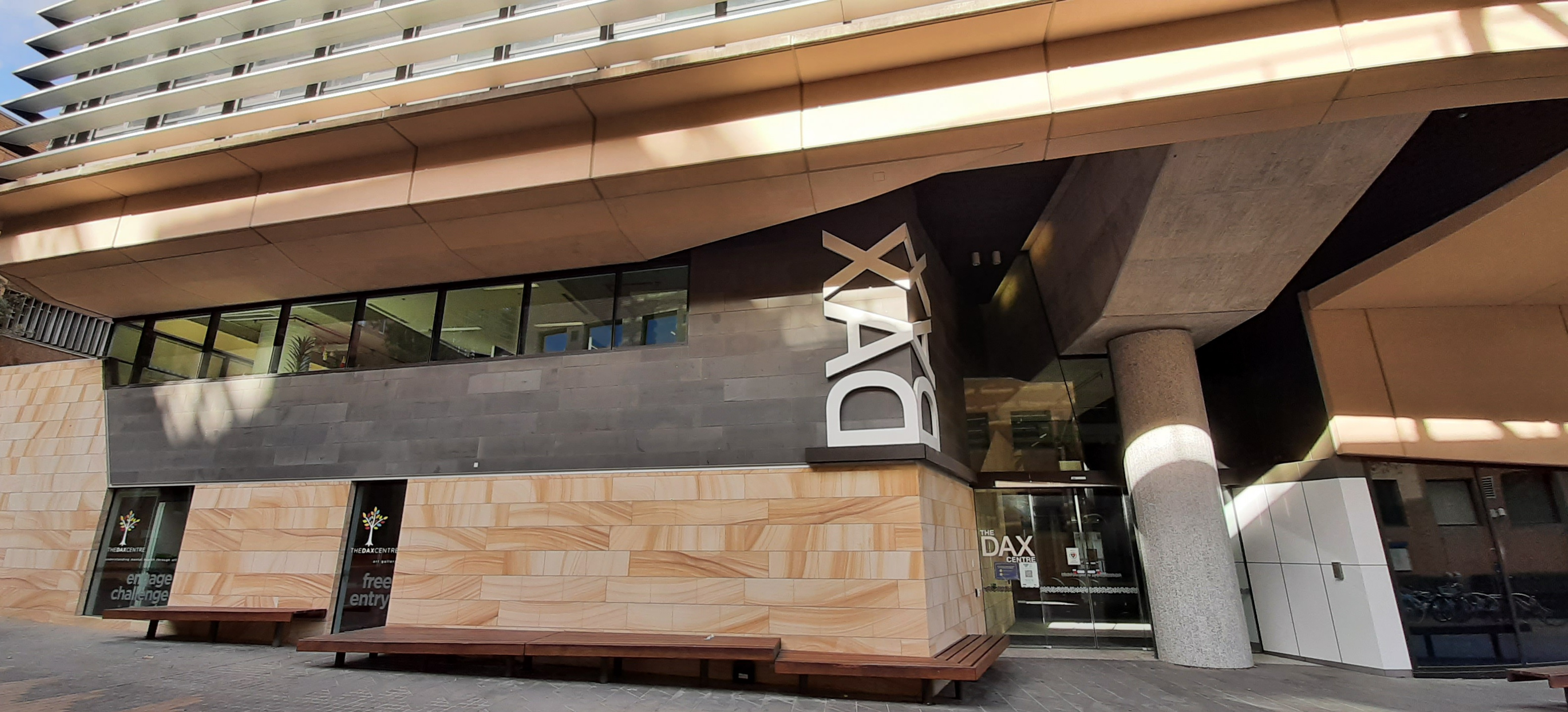
- Established: 2012
- Location: Kenneth Myer Building, University of Melbourne Melbourne Victoria Australia
- Coordinates: 37.79830°S 144.9585°E
- Type: Art Museum
- Website: https://www.daxcentre.org/

The Dax Centre, part of SANE Australia, was opened in 2012 and is a leader in the use of art to raise awareness and reduce stigma towards mental illness through art. The Dax Centre houses and manages the Cunningham Dax Collection of art.

== History ==
The Cunningham Dax collection was started by Dr Eric Cunningham Dax in the 1940s when he was working in the UK and also contains works created at Victorian psychiatric hospitals in the 1950s to the 1980s as well as more recent works. The Dax collection contains over 16,000 works created by people who have experienced mental health issue or psychological trauma and is the only collection of its scale and type in Australia and one of only four in the world. The collection was added to the Victorian Heritage Register in 2009 as being of social and historical significance to the state of Victoria. The centre offers programs and exhibition space at no cost for people living with mental health issues.

In 2025 the centre curated an exhibition called 'Mindscapes', consisting of portraits from its collection, held in Queens Hall at the Parliament of Victoria.
