= Netherne Hospital =

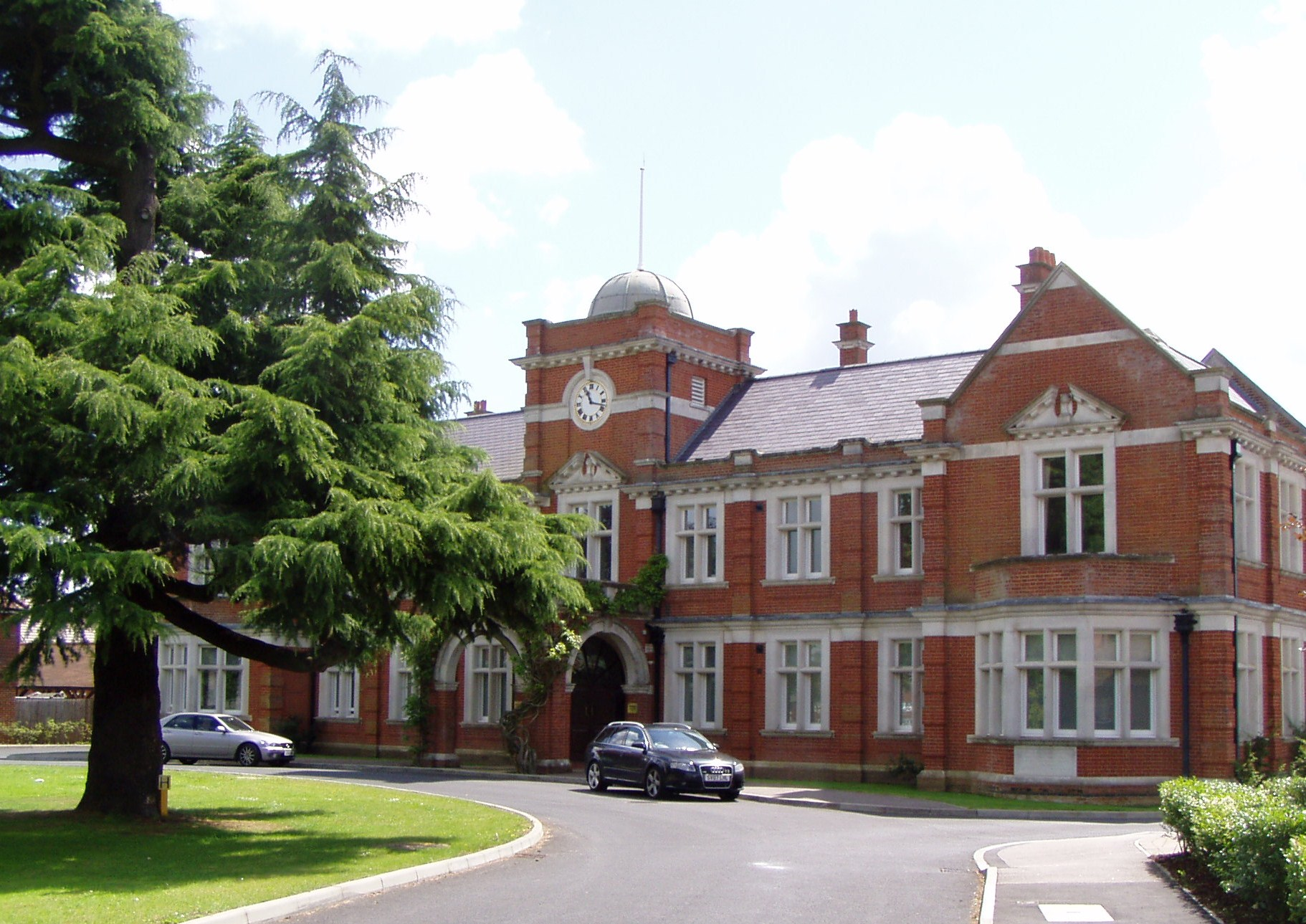
- The former administration block of Netherne Hospital in 2007

- Shown in Surrey

Geography
- Location: Hooley, England, United Kingdom
- Coordinates: 51.292408°N 0.140556°W

Organisation
- Care system: Public NHS
- Type: Public

Services
- Emergency department: No Accident & Emergency

History
- Founded: 1905
- Closed: 1994

Links
- Lists: Hospitals in England

Netherne Hospital, formerly The Surrey County Asylum at Netherne or Netherne Asylum was a psychiatric hospital in Hooley, Surrey in the United Kingdom.

== History ==
=== Design and construction ===
Netherne Asylum was founded on 18 October 1905 to alleviate overcrowding at the existing Brookwood Asylum near Woking. The hospital was designed by George Thomas Hine, Consultant Architect to the Commissioners in Lunacy to hold 960 patients. The buildings followed the popular compact arrow design, with stepped ward blocks on the outside of a broad semi-circle containing the central services such as the administrative offices, laundry, workshops, water tower, boilers and recreation hall. A freestanding chapel was located to the front of the hospital buildings, while an isolation hospital and patients' cemetery were located some distance to the north of the main buildings.

=== Early years ===
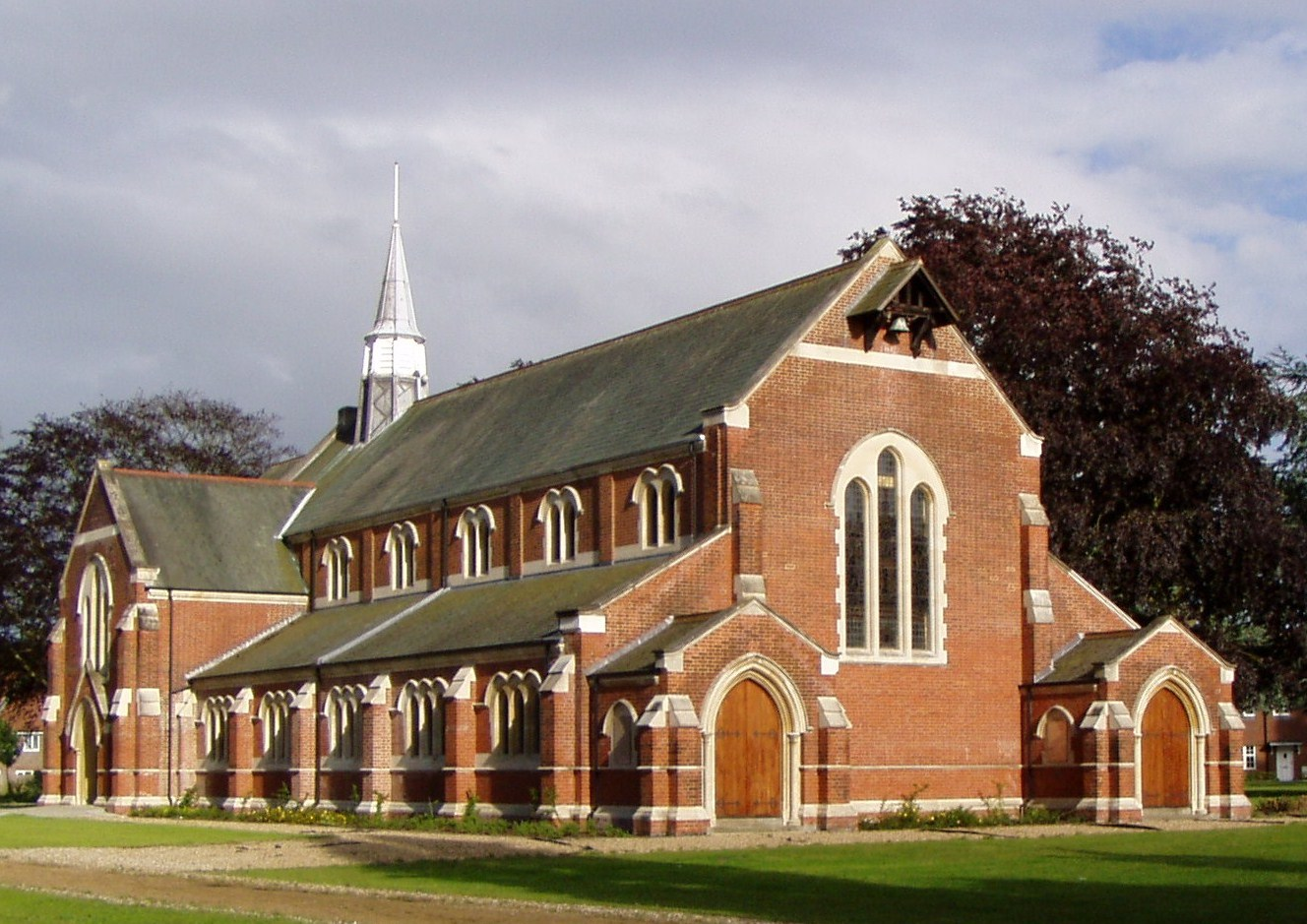
The former hospital chapel of St. Luke, now in use as a swimming pool

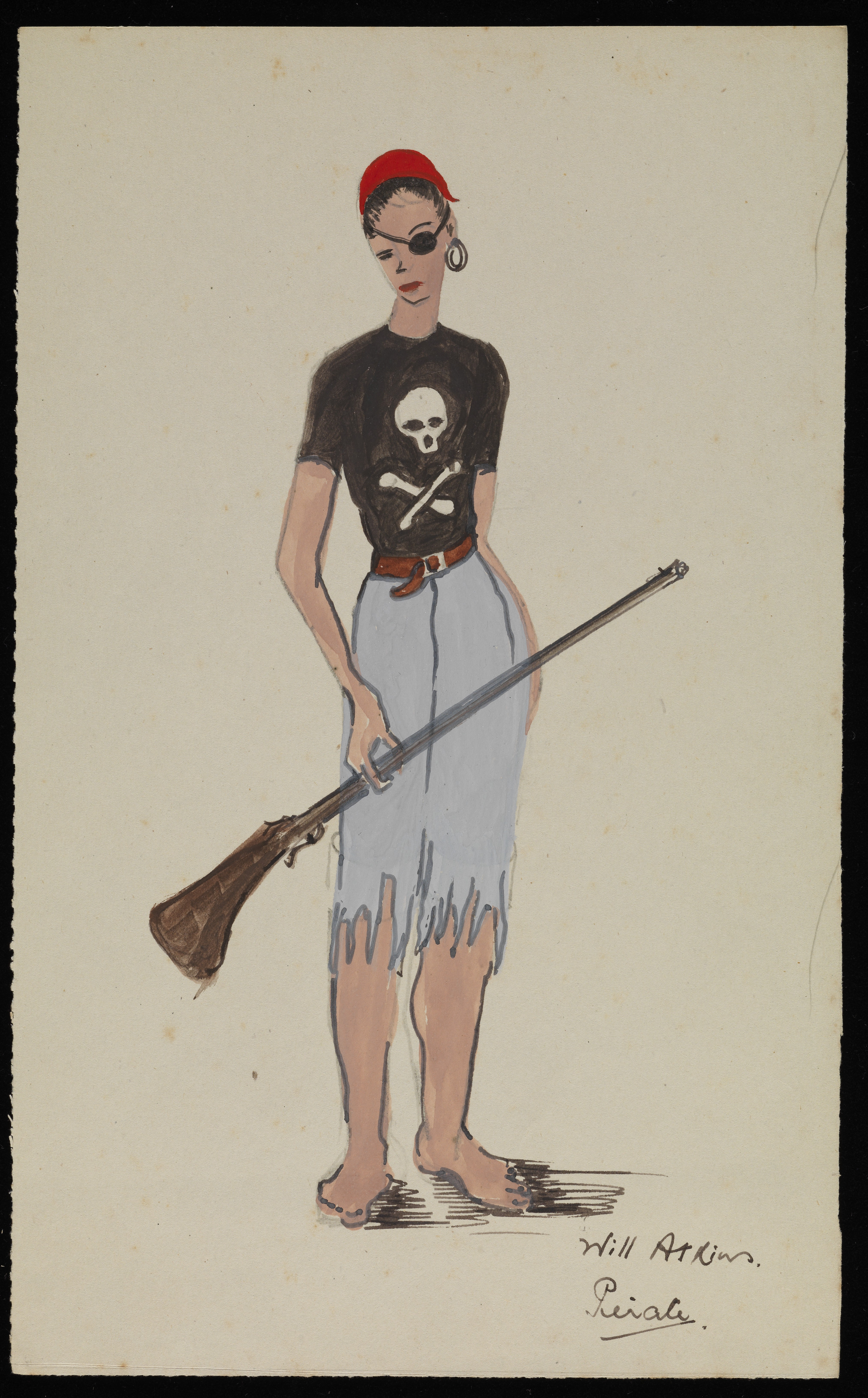
Painting of pirate costume design for Netherne pantomime by Edward Adamson

From its early days, Netherne gained a reputation as a pioneering force in the treatment of mental illness and for setting standards for patient care. Inmates worked on the hospital's extensive estate, in the hospital workshops, in the laundry or were employed in various handicrafts. In their leisure time they could enjoy reading books and newspapers, attend monthly dances and fancy dress parties and a Christmas pantomime in addition to playing indoor and outdoor sports.

During the First World War, Netherne took on significant numbers of patients from neighbouring institutions which had been commandeered as War Hospitals. In the 1920s, the hospital was renamed Netherne Mental Hospital, the term 'Asylum' having fallen out of favour. In 1933, Fairdene, a voluntary admissions hospital was opened to the south of the site together with seven new convalescent villas and two female wards.

=== Second World War ===
Despite recent expansion, the Second World War stretched the hospital's resources with 6 wards and 2 villas being requisitioned for the treatment of air raid casualties. Patients who were able helped to assemble electrical components for a nearby munitions factory and by the end of the war most patients were employed in sustaining the war effort. Over the course of the war, several bombs fell in the grounds and another landed on the nurse's home but failed to explode.

=== Psychosurgery ===
In 1942 Eric Cunningham Dax, medical superintendent of Netherne Hospital, called in surgeon Eric Radley Smith to perform psychosurgery on patients. Before the end of the year, fifty patients had undergone surgery, and in April 1943 the results were published in the Journal of Mental Science. Cunningham Dax described how he selected patients:

"The operation was carried out with the primary object of relieving the most disturbed patients in the hospital quite independently of their poor prognosis. They formed a large proportion of the most violent, hostile, noisy, excited, destructive or obscene cases in the hospital; the type who distress their relatives, upset the other patients and consume the time and energy which could be put to so much better purpose by the staff".

Two died of cerebral haemorrhage, two were discharged (of whom one relapsed); of those remaining in hospital two-thirds had shown at least some improvement, needing less staff time and supervision.

=== Post-War developments ===
In 1948, the hospital became part of the newly formed National Health Service. In the same year, Eleanor Roosevelt visited, later commenting that hospitals in the United States had a lot to learn from Netherne.

The introduction of new drugs in the 1950s caused many changes, including the removal of security fencing. In 1961, following the so-called Water Tower Speech by Minister of Health Enoch Powell which called for mental hospitals to be closed in favour of community care and the use of general hospital acute units, Netherne formed a partnership with Redhill General Hospital in 1965, and the intake of patients was gradually reduced.

Christian worship was provided for by St Luke's Anglican Chapel and a Catholic chapel dedicated to Our Lady of Lourdes, which opened in November 1964 and which was administered by the Church of Our Lady Help of Christians at Old Coulsdon. Its registration for worship was cancelled in February 2000.

=== Art therapy and the Adamson Collection ===
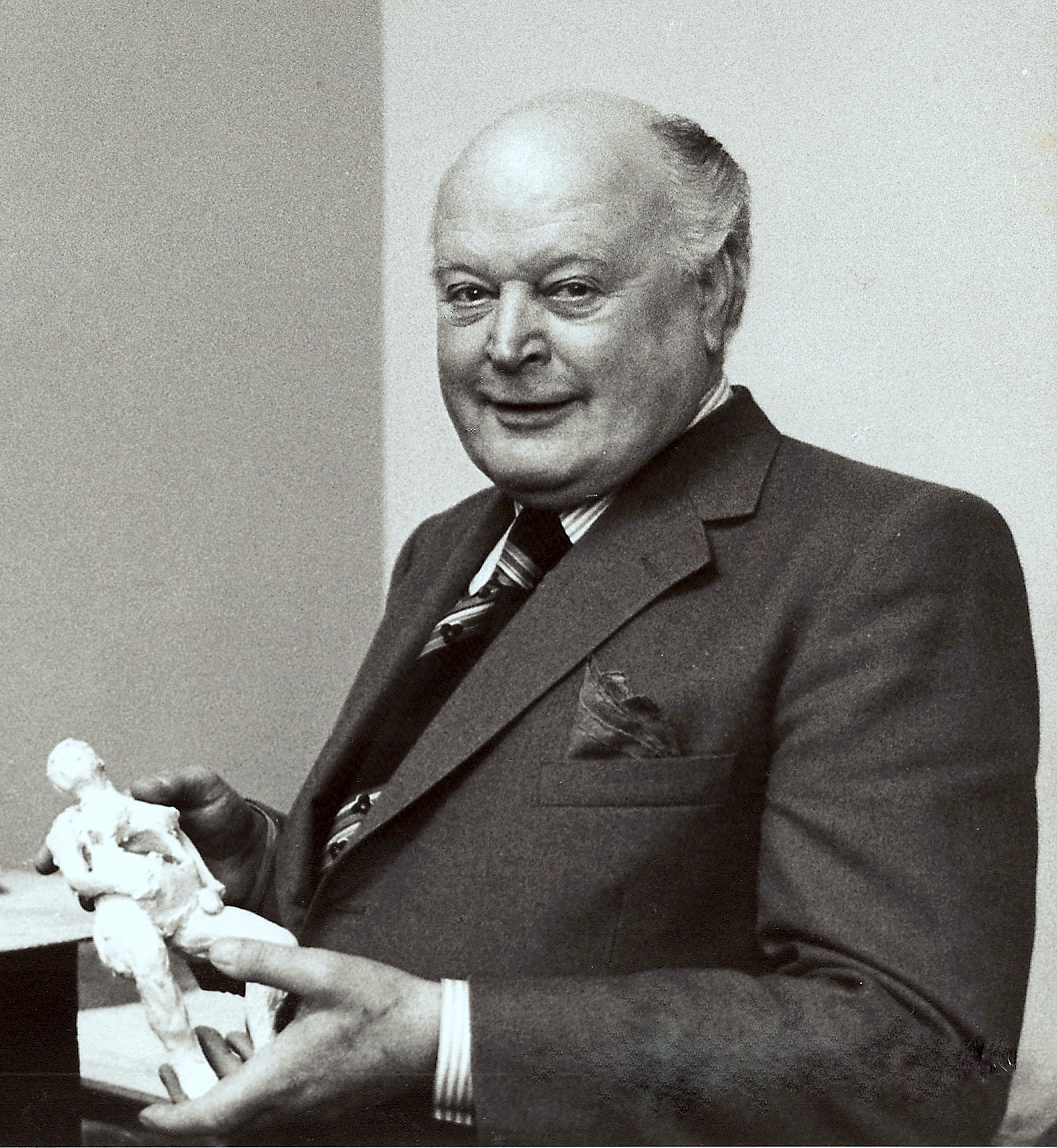
Edward Adamson

From 1946, Netherne became a national centre for art therapy under Edward Adamson, a pioneering art therapist and the first chairman of the British Association of Art Therapists. Adamson established five art studios at the hospital, focusing on art as a means for people to express themselves and communicate their feelings. During his time at Netherne, Adamson worked with hundreds of patients, including the painter William Kurelek and sculptor Rolanda Polonsky. He continued to work at the hospital until his retirement in 1981.

Adamson gathered the works of those compelled to live at Netherne in great number, amassing a considerable collection, estimated at 100,000 at his retirement in 1981; and selected works were on show at a purpose-built gallery opened at Netherne in 1956. After Adamson's death in 1996, the Adamson Collection was moved to Lambeth Hospital, part of South London and Maudsley NHS Foundation Trust, and during 2012 and 2013 almost all re-located to the Wellcome Library in anticipation of a securer future in several international institutions. The Adamson Collection now comprises approximately 6,000 paintings, drawings, sculptures and ceramics, and is of great international and historical importance.

=== Decline and Redevelopment ===
Following a steady decline in patient numbers from almost two thousand in the 1950s to 750 in 1986 and just 150 in 1990, the hospital finally closed in 1994 and the remaining 150 patients were integrated into the local community under a supported care programme.

The former hospital estate was sold by the Secretary of State for Health to developer M J Gleeson in 1995. The development, known as Netherne-on-the-Hill, included about 440 houses and a shop.

== Notable patients ==
- Harold Challenor

== See also ==
- Netherne-on-the-Hill
- Eric Cunningham Dax
- Edward Adamson
