= Art therapy =

Creation of art to improve mental health

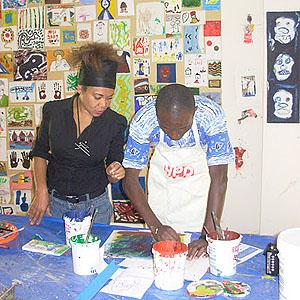
Art therapy workshop in Senegal

Art therapy is a distinct discipline that incorporates creative methods of expression through visual art media. Art therapy, as a creative arts therapy profession, originated in the fields of art and psychotherapy and may vary in definition. Art therapy encourages creative expression through painting, drawing, or modeling. It may work by providing persons with a safe space to express their feelings and allow them to feel more in control over their lives.

There are three main ways that art therapy is employed. The first one is called analytic art therapy. Analytic art therapy is based on the theories that come from analytical psychology, and in more cases, psychoanalysis. Analytic art therapy focuses on the client, the therapist, and the ideas that are transferred between both of them through art. Another way that art therapy is used, is in art psychotherapy. This approach focuses more on the psychotherapists and their analyses of their clients' artwork verbally. The last way art therapy is looked at is through the lens of art as therapy. Some art therapists practicing art as therapy believe that analyzing the client's artwork verbally is not essential, therefore they stress the creation process of the art instead. In all approaches to art therapy, the art therapist's client utilizes paint, paper and pen, clay, sand, fabric, or other media to understand and express their emotions.

Art therapy can be used to help people improve cognitive and sensory motor function, self-esteem, self-awareness, and emotional resilience. It may also aide in resolving conflicts and reduce distress.

The tenets of art therapy involve humanism, creativity, reconciling emotional conflicts, fostering self-awareness, and personal growth.

Art therapy improves positive psychology by helping people find well-being through different unique pathways that add meaning to one's life to help improve positivity.

In November 2023, the National Council of the National Order of Nurses in France concluded that the approximately forty existing meta-analyses, encompassing more than 2,500 studies conducted on art therapy, found no evidence regarding its actual effectiveness on patients' health. The Drawing Diagnostic Series (DDS) is a standardized tool used in clinical assessment to observe psychological patterns.

== History ==
In the history of mental health treatment, art therapy (combining studies of psychology and art) is still a relatively new field. This type of unconventional therapy is used to cultivate self-esteem and awareness, improve cognitive and motor abilities, resolve conflicts or stress, and inspire resilience in patients. It invites sensory, kinesthetic, perceptual, and sensory symbolization to address issues that verbal psychotherapy cannot reach. Although art therapy is a relatively young therapeutic discipline, its roots lie in the use of the arts in the 'moral treatment' of psychiatric patients in the late 18th century.

Art therapy as a profession began in the mid-20th century, arising independently in English-speaking and European countries. Art had been used at the time for various reasons: communication, inducing creativity in children, and in religious contexts. The early art therapists who published accounts of their work acknowledged the influence of aesthetics, psychiatry, psychoanalysis, rehabilitation, early childhood education, and art education, to varying degrees, on their practices.

British artist Adrian Hill coined the term "art therapy" in 1942. Hill, recovering from tuberculosis in a sanatorium, discovered the therapeutic benefits of drawing and painting while convalescing. He wrote that the value of art therapy lay in "completely engrossing the mind (as well as the fingers)…releasing the creative energy of the frequently inhibited patient", which enabled the patient to "build up a strong defense against his misfortunes". He suggested artistic work to his fellow patients. That began his art therapy work, which was documented in 1945 in his book, Art Versus Illness.

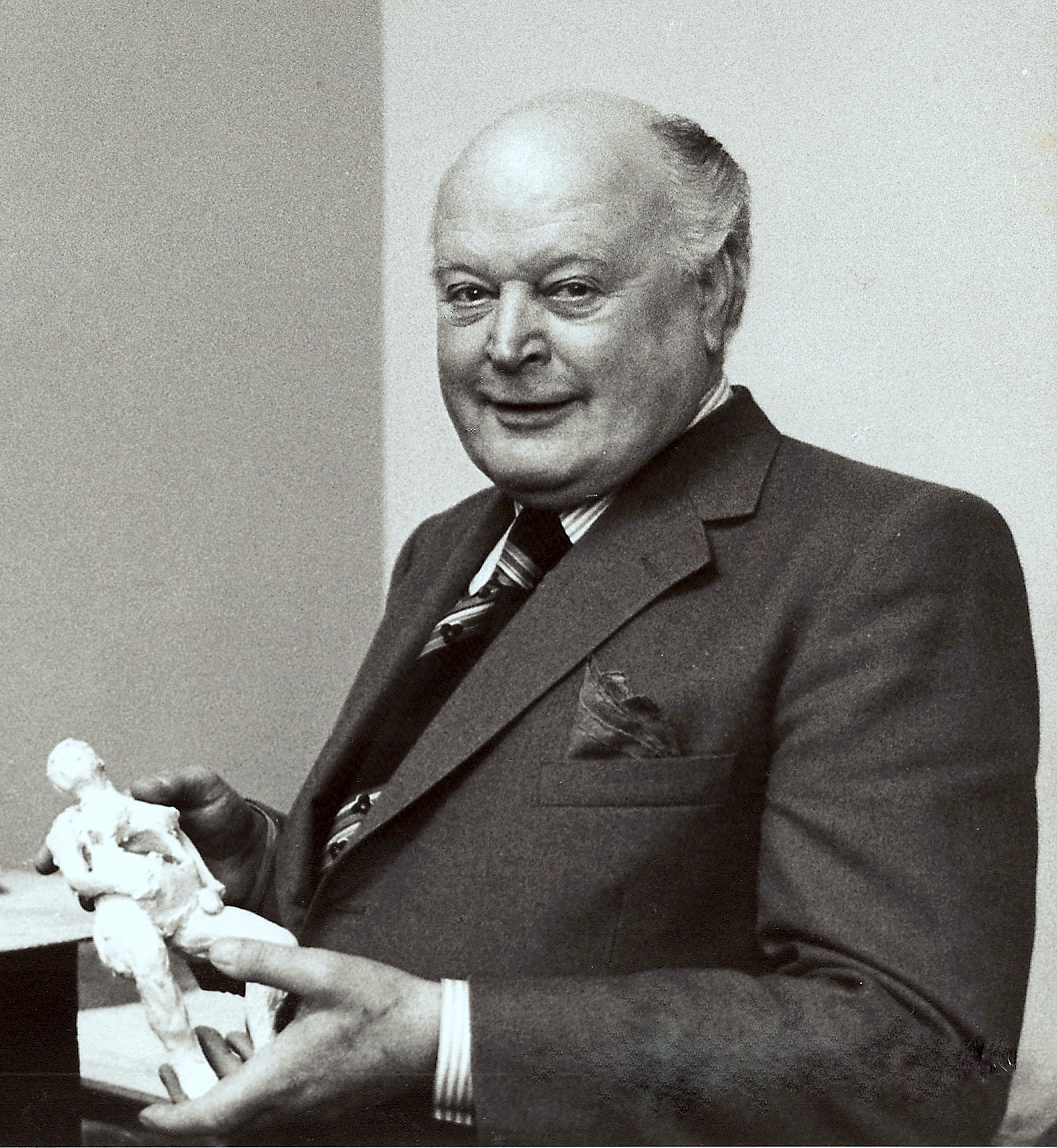
Edward Adamson, "the father of art therapy in Britain"

Artist Edward Adamson, demobilized after World War II, joined Adrian Hill to extend Hill's work to the British long-stay mental hospitals. Adamson studied connections between one's artistic expression and one's release of emotions. One way in which Adamson practiced art therapy was through the depiction of patients' emotions in the art they created. To gain a deeper understanding of how the mind is affected by mental illness, Adamson's collection started as a way to create an environment where patients felt comfortable expressing themselves through art. Mental health professionals would then analyze the art. Other early proponents of art therapy in Britain include E. M. Lyddiatt, Michael Edwards, Diana Raphael-Halliday and Rita Simons. The British Association of Art Therapists was founded in 1964.

U.S. art therapy pioneers Margaret Naumburg and Edith Kramer began practicing at around the same time as Hill. Naumburg, an educator, asserted, "art therapy is psychoanalytically oriented" and that free art expression "becomes a form of symbolic speech which ... leads to an increase in verbalization in the course of therapy." Edith Kramer, an artist, pointed out the importance of the creative process, psychological defenses, and artistic quality, writing that "sublimation is attained when forms are created that successfully contain ... anger, anxiety, or pain." Other early proponents of art therapy in the United States include Elinor Ulman, Robert "Bob" Ault, and Judith Rubin. The American Art Therapy Association was founded in 1969.

Starting in 1974, Paolo Knill, Shaun McNiff, and Norma Canner developed "Expressive Arts Therapy" at Lesley University in Cambridge, USA, by establishing a master's program in "Creative Arts Therapy." This approach is an intermodal and intermedial form of artistic therapy, encompassing multiple art forms.

National professional associations of art therapy exist in many countries, including Brazil, Canada, Finland, Lebanon, Israel, Japan, the Netherlands, Romania, South Korea, Sweden, and Egypt. International networking contributes to the establishment of standards for education and practice.

Diverse perspectives exist on history of art therapy, which complement those that focus on the institutionalization of art therapy as a profession in Britain and the United States.

== Definitions ==
Various definitions exist for the term "art therapy".

The British Association of Art Therapists defines art therapy as: "a form of psychotherapy that uses art media as its primary mode of expression and communication." They also add that "clients who are referred to an art therapist need not have previous experience in art, the art therapist is not primarily concerned with making an aesthetic or diagnostic assessment of the client's image."

The American Art Therapy Association defines art therapy as: "an integrative mental health and human services profession that enriches the lives of individuals, families, and communities through active art-making, creative process, applied psychological theory, and human experience within a psychotherapeutic relationship."

The website Psychology.org defines art therapy as: "a tool therapists use to help patients interpret, express, and resolve their emotions and thoughts. Patients work with an art therapist to explore their emotions, understand conflicts or feelings that are causing them distress, and use art to help them find resolutions to those issues."

== Uses ==
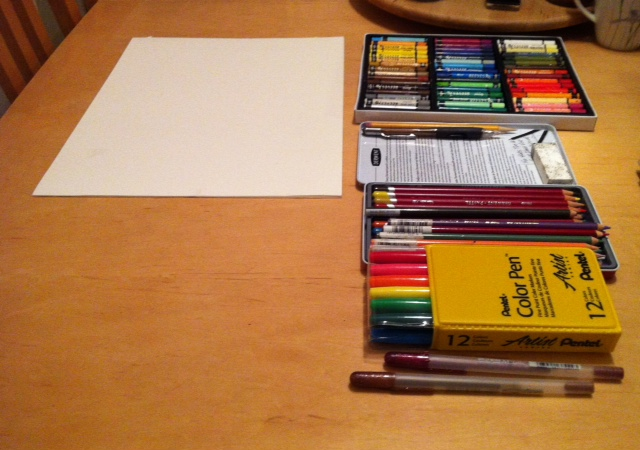
Art media commonly used in art therapy

As a regulated mental health profession, art therapy is employed in many clinical and other settings with diverse populations. It is increasingly recognized as a valid form of therapy. Art therapy can be found in nonclinical settings as well, such as in art studios and creativity development workshops. Licensing for art therapists can vary from state to state, with some recognizing art therapy as a separate license and some licensing under a related field such a professional counseling or mental health counseling. Some of the states that are licensed are Connecticut, Delaware, Kentucky, Maryland, Mississippi, New Jersey, New Mexico, New York, Oregon, Ohio, Tennessee, Virginia, Texas, Pennsylvania, Wisconsin, and Utah, and the District of Columbia. Art therapists must have a master's degree that includes training in the creative process, psychological development, and group therapy, and must complete a clinical internship. Depending on the state, province, or country, the term "art therapist" may be reserved for those who are professionals trained in both art and therapy and hold a master's or doctoral degree in art therapy or certification in art therapy obtained after a graduate degree in a related field. Other professionals, such as clinical mental health counseling, social workers, psychologists, and play therapists, optionally combine art making with basic psychotherapeutic modalities in their treatment. Therapists may better understand a client's absorption of information after assessing elements of their artwork.

An article published by the American Art Therapy Association says that there is a 'small' (or limited) body of evidence—essentially two quantitative studies—that could support the idea of an efficacy of art therapy.

=== Acute illness ===
A review of the literature has shown the influence of art therapy on patient care and found that participants in art therapy programs have less difficulty sleeping, among other benefits. Additionally, clinical studies have uncovered that patients in units with art therapy exhibited better vital signs, reduced stress-related cortisol levels, and required less medication to induce sleep. Other studies have found that merely observing a landscape photograph in a hospital room had reduced need for narcotic pain relievers and less time in recovery at the hospital. In addition, either looking at or creating art in hospitals helped stabilize vital signs, speed up the healing process, and increase optimism in patients.

=== Cancer ===
Many studies have been conducted on the benefits of art therapy on cancer patients. It has been found useful for supporting patients during the stress of surgery, radiation, and chemotherapy treatment.

In a study involving women facing cancer-related difficulties such as fear, pain, and altered social relationships found:

Engaging in different types of visual art (textiles, card making, collage, pottery, watercolor, acrylics) helped these women in four major ways. First, it helped them focus on positive life experiences, relieving their ongoing preoccupation with cancer. Second, it enhanced their self-worth and identity by providing them with opportunities to demonstrate continuity, challenge, and achievement. Third, it enabled them to maintain a social identity that resisted being defined by cancer. Finally, it allowed them to express their feelings in a symbolic manner, especially during chemotherapy.

Another study showed those who participated in these types of activities were discharged earlier than those who did not participate. Even relatively short-term art therapy interventions may significantly improve patients' emotional states and symptoms.

A review of 12 studies investigated the use of art therapy in cancer patients by investigating the symptoms of emotional, social, physical, and spiritual concerns of cancer patients. They found that art therapy can improve the process of psychological readjustment to the change, loss, and uncertainty associated with surviving cancer. Art therapy was suggested as providing a sense of "meaning-making" through the physical act of creating the art. Giving five individual sessions of art therapy once per week was shown to be useful for personal empowerment by helping the cancer patients understand their own boundaries in relation to the needs of other people. In turn, those who had art therapy treatment felt more connected to others and found social interaction more enjoyable than individuals who did not receive the treatment. Furthermore, art therapy improved motivation levels, ability to discuss emotional and physical health, general well-being, and increased quality of life in cancer patients.

Additionally, recent research has shown that creative expression during hospital stays can lower anxiety and pain perception and enhance physiological stability. In one clinical study, art therapy led to a statistically significant reduction in cancer-related symptoms, such as fatigue and emotional distress.

=== Dementia ===
Art therapy has been observed to have positive effects on patients with dementia, with tentative evidence supports benefits with respect to quality of life. Although art therapy helps with behavioral issues, it does not appear to reverse degenerating mental faculties. The art tools must be easy to use and relatively simple to understand. Art therapy had no clear results on affecting memory or emotional well-being scales. However, Alzheimer's Association states that art and music can enrich people's lives and allow for self-expression. D.W. Zaidel, a researcher and therapist at VAGA, claims that engagement with art can stimulate specific areas of the brain involved in language processing and visuospatial perception, two cognitive functions that decline significantly in dementia patients. Art therapy allows those experiencing memory loss to stay connected with other people and the world around them, by bringing them the opportunity to bond with those who matter to their lives. People with dementia can become very isolated, as many of their abilities, including the ability to understand abstract thinking and verbalize and communicate, disappear. Creating art in a group setting gives people with dementia a chance to interact with those around them, while reducing the pressure that many social gatherings can normally bring to those facing this condition.

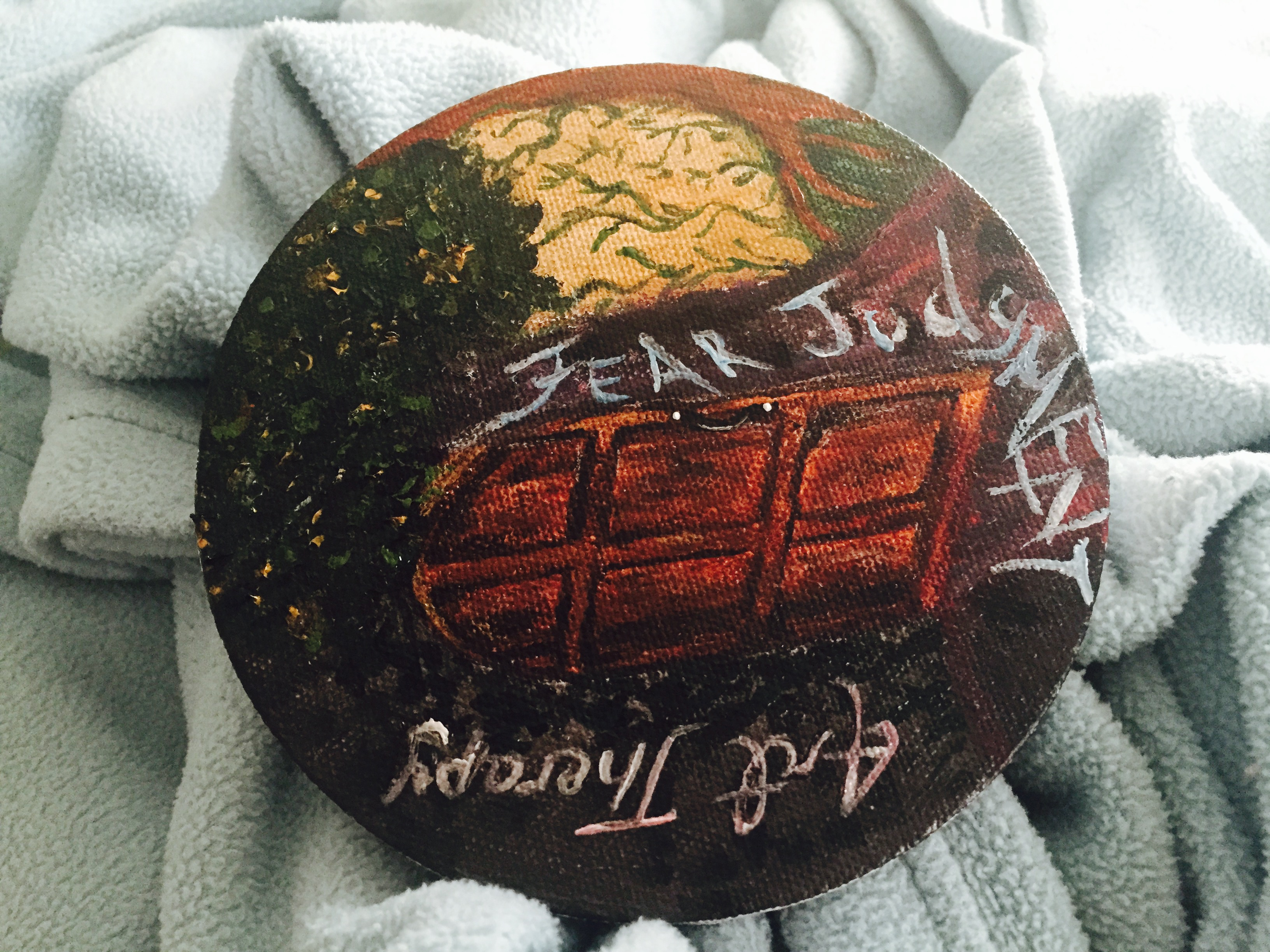
An art therapy patient's work

=== Autism ===
Art therapy is increasingly recognized to help address challenges of people with autism. Art therapy may address core symptoms of autism spectrum disorders by promoting sensory regulation, supporting psychomotor development, and facilitating communication. The creative activities involved in art therapy, such as painting or drawing, can affect certain skills, such as social interaction skills, which can be beneficial for those with autism. It is also thought to promote emotional and mental growth by allowing self-expression, visual communication, and creativity. Most importantly, studies have found that painting, drawing, or music therapies may allow people with autism to communicate in a manner more comfortable for them than speech. In Egypt, the Egyptian Autism Society implemented art therapy as a way to grow self-esteem and quality of life in children. They incorporated basketweaving, a common cultural art activity, in art therapy programs. These activities were part of studies that focused on self-esteem and proved that art therapy significantly, "...increased inner strength and daily living skills and reduced symptoms of emotional disorders...". Other forms of therapy that tend to help individuals with autism include play therapy and ABA therapy. In India, a study was done to show the effectiveness of art therapy by using both a controlled and experimental group on nine individuals with autism. One of the researchers, Koo, stated, "The positive changes were notable in the participants' cognitive, social, and motor skills".

=== Schizophrenia ===
A 2005 systematic review of art therapy as supplemental treatment for schizophrenia found unclear effects. Group art therapy has been shown to improve some symptoms of schizophrenia. While studies concluded that art therapy did not improve clinical global impression or global assessment of functioning, they showed that the use of haptic art materials to express one's emotions, cognitions, and perceptions in a group setting lowered depressing themes and may improve self-esteem, enforce creativity, and facilitate the integrative therapeutic process for people with schizophrenia. Overall, some tests on the effectiveness of art therapy on patients with schizophrenia show effective results. From a pilot study done by Crawford, professionals worked through art-therapy inventions to assist the patient's process and understanding of the image when creating art, and these patients showed a decline in negative manifestations of schizophrenia, compared to patients who received the typical care for schizophrenia. Art therapy resulted in an increased emotional awareness for these patients, as by the end of the treatment, the treated group had very few positive manifestations of schizophrenia compared to the control group.

=== Post-traumatic stress disorder ===
Art therapy may alleviate trauma-induced emotions, such as shame and anger. It is also likely to increase trauma survivors' sense of empowerment and control by encouraging children to make choices in their artwork. Art therapy in addition to psychotherapy offered more reduction in trauma symptoms than just psychotherapy alone.

Art therapy may be an effective way to access and process traumatic memories that were encoded visually in clients. Through art therapy, individuals may be able to make more sense of their traumatic experiences and form accurate trauma narratives. Gradual exposure to these narratives may reduce trauma-induced symptoms, such as flashbacks and nightmares. Repetition of directives reduces anxiety, and visually creating narratives helps clients build coping skills and balanced nervous system responses. This has been proven effective only in long-term art therapy interventions.

The ways in which art therapy addresses trauma can be summarized as: The process of making the artwork is a challenge that involves multiple cognitive, emotional, and physical factors.

=== Depression ===
==== In children ====
Children who have experienced trauma may benefit from group art therapy. The group format is effective in helping survivors develop relationships with others who have experienced similar situations. Group art therapy may also be beneficial in helping children with trauma to regain trust and social self-esteem. As children sometimes have a hard time expressing their emotions through words, art therapy gives them an opportunity to do so in another manner, which a therapist can use to determine the type of care the child needs. Not only does it benefit therapists, as it helps them create a treatment plan, but it also helps the children express their emotions and alleviate ill feelings.

==== In veterans ====
Art therapy has an established history of being used to treat veterans, with the American Art Therapy Association (AATA) documenting its use as early as 1945. As with other sources of trauma, combat veterans may benefit from art therapy to access memories and engage with treatment. A 2016 randomized control trial found that art therapy in conjunction with cognitive processing therapy (CPT) was more beneficial than CPT alone. Walter Reed Army Medical Center, the National Intrepid Center of Excellence and other Veteran Association institutions use art therapy to help veterans with PTSD.

=== Bereavement ===
According to the AATA, art therapy is "particularly effective during times of crisis, changes in circumstance, trauma, and grief." Bereavement is one challenging time where clients find verbalizing their feelings of loss and shock to be difficult, so may use creative means to express their feelings. For example, it has been used to enable children to express their feelings of loss where they may lack the maturity to verbalize their bereavement.

=== Eating disorders ===
Art therapy may help people with anorexia with associated depression and weight management. Traumatic or negative childhood experiences can result in unintentionally harmful coping mechanisms, such as eating disorders. Art therapy may provide an outlet for exploring these experiences and emotions.

Art therapy may be beneficial for clients with eating disorders because clients can create visual representations with art material of progress made, represent alterations to the body, and provide a nonthreatening method of acting out impulses. Individuals with eating disorders tend to rely heavily on defense mechanisms to feel a sense of control; it is important that clients feel a sense of authority over their art products through freedom of expression and controllable art materials.

=== Daily challenges ===
Healthy individuals without mental or physical illnesses are also treated with art therapy; these patients often have ongoing challenges such as high-intensity jobs, financial constraints, and other non-traumatic personal issues. Findings revealed that art therapy reduces levels of stress and burnout related to patients' professions.

== Methods ==
Art therapists choose materials and interventions appropriate to their clients' needs, and design sessions to achieve therapeutic goals. They may use the creative process to help their clients increase insight, cope with stress, work through traumatic experiences, increase cognitive, memory, and neurosensory abilities, improve interpersonal relationships, and achieve greater self-fulfillment. Activities an art therapist chooses to do with clients depend on a variety of factors such as their mental state or age. Art therapists may draw upon images from resources such as the Archive for Research in Archetypal Symbolism to incorporate historical art and symbols into their work with patients.

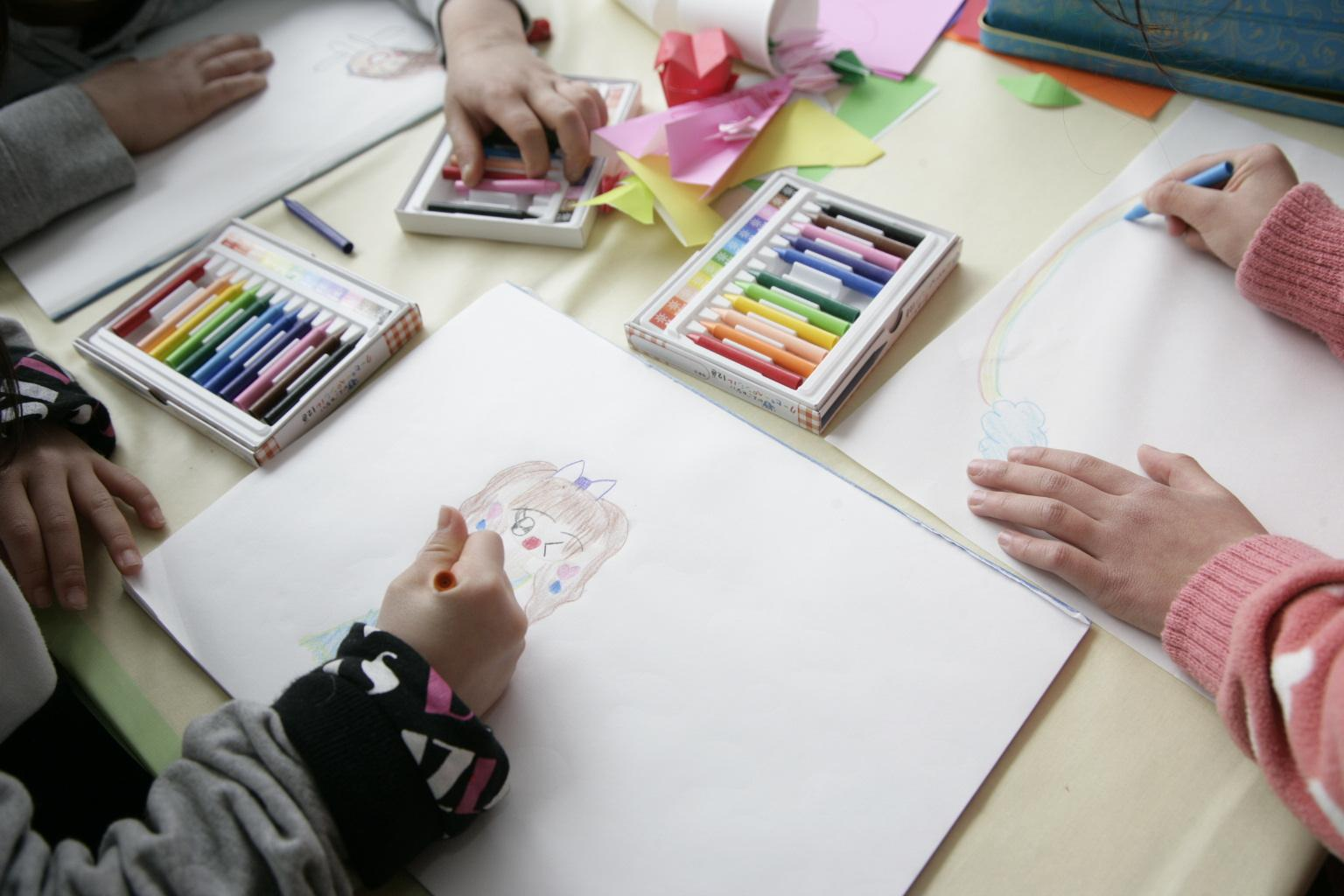
An image depicting an art therapy method used by children

Art therapy can take place in a variety of different settings. Art therapists may vary the goals of art therapy and the way they provide it, depending upon the institution's or client's needs. After an assessment of the client's strengths and needs, art therapy may be offered in either an individual or group format, according to which is better suited to the person. Art therapist Dr. Ellen G. Horovitz wrote, "My responsibilities vary from job to job. It is wholly different when one works as a consultant or in an agency as opposed to private practice. In private practice, it becomes more complex and far reaching. If you are the primary therapist, then your responsibilities can swing from the spectrum of social work to the primary care of the patient. This includes dovetailing with physicians, judges, family members, and sometimes even community members that might be important in the caretaking of the individual."

Some types of art therapies include therapeutic photography, photo-art therapy, and video therapy. Therapeutic photography involves using photography for artistic statements with no real therapist involved. It is a type of self-directed art therapy that involves self-awareness, creative expression, and wellness. Photo-art therapy involves using photographs as the method of art. It involves art making during the therapy session, and can involve photographic techniques. Films can also be considered in this classification of art therapy. Finally, video therapy is an early term that is used to describe film in art therapy. Art therapists use videos to assist in treating clients, as patients watch certain videos known to have therapeutic results.

== Art-based assessments ==
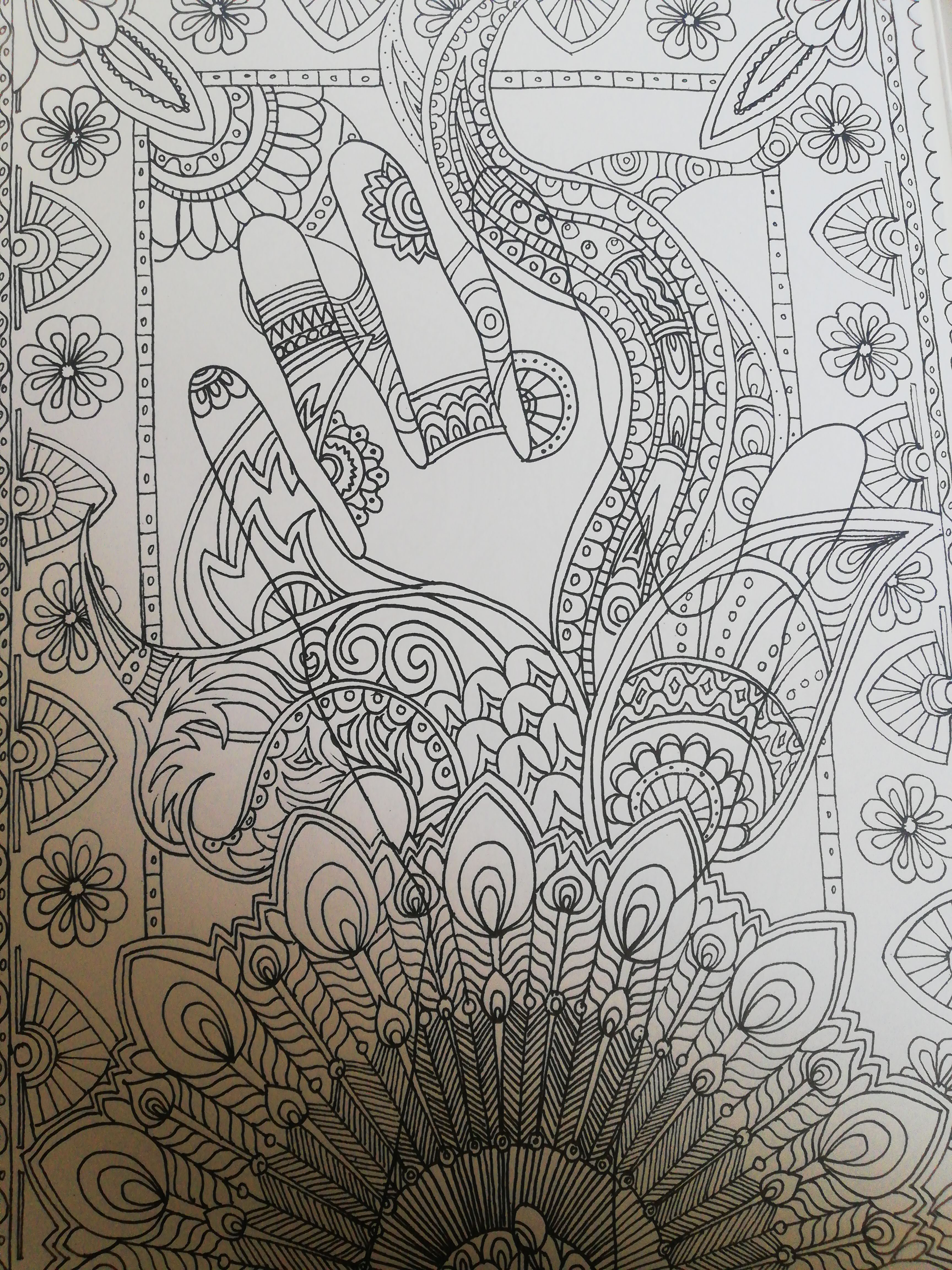
A coloring book page with a mandala motif

Art therapists and other professionals use art-based assessments to evaluate emotional, cognitive, and developmental conditions. The first drawing assessment for psychological purposes was created in 1906 by German psychiatrist Fritz Mohr. In 1926, researcher Florence Goodenough created a drawing test to measure the intelligence in children called the Draw-a-Man test, which posited the notion that a child who incorporated more detail into a drawing was more intelligent than one who did not. Goodenough and other researchers concluded the test had just as much to do with personality as it did intelligence. Several other psychiatric art assessments created in the 1940s are still used today. However, many art therapists eschew diagnostic testing and some writers question the validity of therapists making interpretative assumptions. Below are some examples of popular art therapy assessments:

=== Mandala Assessment Research Instrument ===
In this assessment, a person is asked to select a card from a deck with different mandalas, a repetitive symbol originating in Buddhism, and then must choose a color from a set of colored cards. The person is then asked to draw the mandala from the card they choose with an oil pastel of the color of their choice. The artist is then asked to explain if any meanings, experiences, or related information were related to the mandala they drew. This test is based on the beliefs of Joan Kellogg, who sees a correlation between the images, pattern, and shapes in the mandalas that people draw and the personalities of the artists.

Mandala drawing is one of the most diverse art therapy methods that can reach different groups of people to address a wide variety of needs. A mandala is a drawing that starts from an inner point and then expands outwards using circles. Mandalas have been used to identify psychological issues, reduce stress and anxiety, and improve one's self worth and well-being.

=== House–Tree–Person ===
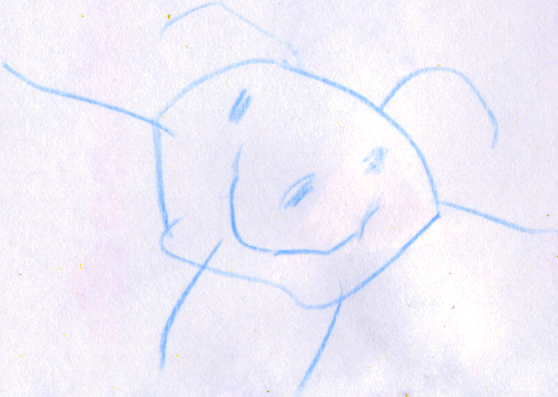
Four-year-old's drawing of a person

Modeled after Goodenough's Draw-a-Man test, childhood psychologist John Buck created the house-tree-person test in 1946. In the assessment, the client is asked to create a drawing that includes a house, a tree, and a person, after which the therapist asks several questions about each. For example, with reference to the house, Buck wrote questions such as, "Is it a happy house?" and "What is the house made of?" Regarding the tree, questions include, "About how old is that tree?" and "Is the tree alive?" Concerning the person, questions include, "Is that person happy?" and "How does that person feel?"

The house–tree–person test is a projective personality test, a type of examination in which the test taker responds to or provides ambiguous, abstract, or unstructured stimuli (often in the form of pictures or drawings). It is designed to measure aspects of a person's personality through interpretation of drawings and responses to questions, self-perceptions, and attitudes.

== Outsider art ==
The relationship between the fields of art therapy and outsider art has been widely debated. The term art brut was first coined by French artist Jean Dubuffet to describe "art created outside the boundaries of official culture". Dubuffet used the term art brut to focus on artistic practice by insane-asylum patients. The English translation "outsider art" was first used by art critic Roger Cardinal in 1972. Outsider art continues to be associated with mentally ill or developmentally disabled individuals.

Both terms have been criticized because of their social and personal impacts on both patients and artists. Art therapy professionals have been accused of not putting enough emphasis on the artistic value and meaning of the artist's works, considering them only from a medical perspective. However, critics of the outsider art movement suggest that crediting an artist's work to an impairment is reductive.

== See also ==
- Artistic freedom
- Bibliotherapy
- Comic book therapy
- Creativity and mental health
- Expressive therapy
- List of psychotherapies
- List of therapies
- Music therapy
