= Walden School (New York City) =

Defunct private day school in Manhattan

Information
- School type: Private school
- Established: 1914
- Closed: 1988

Walden School was a private day school in Manhattan, New York City, founded by Margaret Naumburg. The school, operated from 1914 until 1988, when it merged with the New Lincoln School after it filed for bankruptcy in 1987. However, the merged school closed in 1991. Walden was known as an innovator in progressive education. Faculty were addressed by first names and students were given great leeway in determining their course of study. Located on Central Park West at 88th Street, the school was very popular with intellectual families from the Upper West Side and with families based in Greenwich Village. The Walden School was founded in 1914 by Margaret Naumburg, an educator who later became an art therapist. Claire Raphael Reis, a musician, was also involved.

Naumburg, who had been exposed to the theories of John Dewey at Columbia University, embraced "individual transformation" as an education principle, encouraging creative expression and self-motivated learning. Throughout its history, the Walden School emphasized the visual and performing arts. Competition between students was minimized. No standardized exams were required for admission.

Walden's original building at Central Park West and 88th Street was demolished. However, Walden's adjacent building at 1 West 88th, now known as the Goodman Building after Walden alumnus and civil rights martyr Andrew Goodman, is now occupied by Trevor Day School.

== Notable faculty ==
- Hans Maeder taught at Walden School and served as its interim head in the 1940s before leaving to start Stockbridge School in Massachusetts.
- Florence Cane taught art, sister of Margaret Naumburg
- Stanley Bosworth taught French, before going on to lead Saint Ann's School in Brooklyn

== Notable alumni ==
- Neil Barsky (1958-), journalist
- Paul Freedman (1949-), historian
- Elmer Bernstein (1922–2004), jazz and film composer
- John Berry (1963–2016), musician and founding member of the Beastie Boys
- Matthew Broderick (1962–), actor
- Adam Clymer (1937–2018), journalist and author
- Michael Diamond (1965–), member of the Beastie Boys
- Helga Davis (1964-), multidisciplinary artist
- Jane Dudley (1912–2001), modern dancer
- Yvette (Hardman) Edmondson (1915–2006) oceanographer and journal editor
- Peter Elias (1923–2001), professor of electrical engineering and computer science at MIT
- Joe Frank (1938-2018), radio performer
- Carol Gilligan (1936–), educational psychologist
- Leonard Gillman (1917-2009), pianist and mathematician
- Andrew Goodman (1943–1964), civil rights activist
- Alex Guarnaschelli (1972–), celebrity chef and television personality
- Steven Heller (1950–), design writer
- Peter Kivy (1934–2017), professor of musicology and philosophy at Rutgers University
- Saul Landau (1936–2013), documentary filmmaker, author, biographer of Fidel Castro
- Jeanne Lee (1939–2000), jazz singer
- Glenn Ligon (1960–), conceptual artist
- Kenneth Lonergan (1962–), playwright, film director
- Janet Margolin (1943–1993), theater, television and film actress
- Mike Nichols (1931–2014), film and theatre director, producer, actor and comedian
- Robert Paterson (1970–), composer
- Abigail Pogrebin (1965–), writer, journalist, podcast host
- Robin Pogrebin (1965–), reporter
- Margaret Purcell (1914–1991), composer
- Mark G. Raizen, physicist
- Judith L. Rapoport (1933–2026), child psychiatrist, scientist
- Simon Rosenberg (1963–), political activist and founder of New Democrat Network and the New Policy Institute
- Susan Rosenberg (1955–), activist
- Tony Saletan (1931–2025), American folksinger and musician
- Raphael Sbarge (1964–), actor
- Kyra Sedgwick (1965–), actor, producer, director
- Jonathan Steinberg (historian) (1934–2021), historian
- Jane Stern (1946–), food writer
- Edgar Tafel (1912–2011), architect
- Richard Teitelbaum (1939–2020), composer, keyboardist, and improvisor
- Barbara W. Tuchman (1912–1989), historian
- Horatio Weisfeld (1963-), writer, editor, publisher
- David Zwirner (1964–), contemporary art dealer
