= Margaret Naumburg =

Psychologist

- Born: Margaret Naumburg; May 14, 1890; New York City, United States
- Died: February 26, 1983 (aged 92); Boston, Massachusetts, United States
- Education: Vassar College, Barnard College, Columbia University, London School of Economics
- Known for: First American psychologist to provide training and graduate level courses in art therapy. Introduction of the first Montessori school in America.
- Awards: Honorary Life Membership, American Art Therapy Association, Ernest Kris Prize in 1973, Fellow of the American Orthopsychiatric Association and the American Psychological Association
- Scientific career
- Fields: psychology, education, child development, art therapy, dynamically oriented art therapy
- Workplaces: Walden School, University of Louisville, New York Psychiatric Institute, New York University

Margaret Naumburg (May 14, 1890 – February 26, 1983) was an American psychologist, progressive educator, author and among the first major theoreticians of art therapy. She named her approach dynamically oriented art therapy. Prior to working in art therapy, she founded the Walden School of New York City.

== Life and work ==
=== Family Life ===
Margaret Naumburg was born in New York City on May 14, 1890, into a prominent German-Jewish family whose wealth and cultural capital positioned her within New York’s elite circles. Her father, Max Naumburg, descended from a long line of musicians and Reform Jewish community leaders originally from Bavaria. The family had a deep legacy in music patronage: her cousin Walter Naumburg founded the prestigious Naumburg Prize, and her uncle Elkan Naumburg funded the construction of the Naumburg Bandshell in Central Park, where free classical concerts continue today.

Despite these privileged surroundings, Margaret’s childhood was emotionally difficult and creatively stifling. Her mother, Therese Kahnweiler Naumburg, was socially conservative and upheld rigid domestic norms, which Margaret found oppressive. Margaret later described her early home life as one in which “youthful efforts at creation were laughed at or brushed aside” and where compliance, silence, and order were expected above all else. As a teenager, she wrote on her bedroom wall: “To avoid criticism, do nothing, say nothing, be nothing”—a bleak encapsulation of the psychic confinement she experienced within her family home.

She had two older sisters, Alice and Florence, and one younger brother, Robert. Of all her siblings, Florence, eight years Margaret’s senior, exerted the most enduring influence. Florence was graceful, artistic, and independent—qualities Margaret longed for and admired. In adulthood, Florence became an artist and educator, later collaborating with Margaret at the Walden School as the head of its art department. Together, they would pioneer early practices that integrated psychoanalytic and creative expression in child development, laying the groundwork for art therapy.

In 1916, Margaret married the writer and intellectual Waldo Frank. Their marriage was forged within the progressive, bohemian milieu of Greenwich Village and was understood by both to be unconventional. Frank was openly unfaithful and considered the marriage more of a social arrangement. They had one son, Thomas Frank, in 1922. While Waldo hoped that parenthood would bring emotional unity to the relationship, Margaret found herself overwhelmed—both by the demands of motherhood and the collapse of their shared idealism. The marriage deteriorated, and they divorced in 1924.

During and after her marriage, Margaret engaged in an intense romantic and spiritual relationship with Jean Toomer, the Black writer and mystic best known for Cane. Their bond was forged through mutual involvement in the teachings of Georges Gurdjieff, whose spiritual system of “The Work” emphasized harmony between mind, body, and emotion. However, their relationship ultimately fell apart due to both interpersonal tensions and the racialized dynamics of Toomer’s leadership within the Harlem Gurdjieff community, which Margaret struggled to navigate.

Margaret's family life—marked by emotional constraint, gendered expectations, and personal longing—deeply informed her educational and therapeutic innovations. Her vision of child-centered education and her later development of dynamically oriented art therapy can both be seen as direct responses to the repressions of her early familial world. Rather than replicating the moralism and rigidity of her upbringing, Naumburg’s life work sought to liberate creativity, give voice to unconscious expression, and foster relational freedom.

=== Education ===
Margaret Naumburg’s educational path reflected both her rebellion against conventional schooling and her lifelong search for integrative, liberatory approaches to learning. After a childhood marked by dissatisfaction with rigid classroom structures—where she recalled “the hard wooden benches, the rigid posture, often hands behind the back, and the enforced silence of school periods”—Naumburg sought out alternative models of education that emphasized individuality, creativity, and psychological insight.

She first attended public schools and then transferred to the Horace Mann School, an experimental division of Teachers College, Columbia University. Despite the school's progressive mission, Naumburg found little relief from what she described as the "monotony" of education. These experiences planted the seeds for her later rejection of conventional pedagogy in favor of more psychologically attuned, child-centered models.

In 1908, Naumburg enrolled at Vassar College, but after one year transferred to Barnard College, where she graduated with a B.A. in 1912. At Barnard, she came into contact with influential thinkers such as philosopher John Dewey and his daughter Evelyn Dewey, a fellow student and prominent suffragist. Although Dewey’s progressive ideas would later shape Naumburg’s theoretical foundations, she was at the time unsure of her professional direction. In fact, she later wrote, “When I graduated from college, I thought that the one profession I must avoid was becoming an educator,” due to her own disillusionment with the schooling she had endured.

While at Barnard, Naumburg majored in economics and psychology—fields that were, at the time, still contested spaces for women. She was drawn to the nascent discipline of psychology, especially the emerging psychoanalytic literature. She read some of the first U.S. publications on Sigmund Freud, including articles by A.A. Brill, which sparked a deep fascination with the unconscious that would shape both her educational and clinical work.

After graduation, she began graduate study at the London School of Economics in 1912, where she attended Sidney Webb’s seminar on labor conditions in the cinematography industry. Although she initially thrived there—writing to her parents that her experience in London “meant more to me than my four years of college”—she left after one term to study with Maria Montessori in Rome. She enrolled in the First International Montessori Training Course in early 1913, one of the first Americans to do so. While she was initially enthusiastic, a personal and philosophical rift soon developed between Naumburg and Montessori, whom she found to be authoritarian and unwilling to tolerate questioning. Nevertheless, she remained committed to the principles of child-directed learning and sensory-based education that she encountered in Montessori’s work.

While in Rome, Naumburg also met Ethel Webb and Irene Tasker, both of whom were early practitioners of the Alexander Technique. Intrigued by their ideas, Naumburg later traveled to London in the summer of 1913 to study directly with F. Matthias Alexander. She was struck by the Technique’s focus on bodily awareness, inhibition, and psycho-physical integration. Though their professional philosophies would ultimately diverge, Naumburg incorporated aspects of the Technique into her pedagogical and therapeutic thinking.

Naumburg’s educational formation—spanning elite American colleges, European progressive movements, and somatic disciplines—was eclectic, experimental, and foundationally interdisciplinary. Her ability to synthesize ideas from psychology, education, the arts, and somatic practice would become a hallmark of her later contributions to art therapy and progressive schooling. In many ways, her education was less about formal credentials than about intellectual immersion in new and creative modes of thinking—modes she would continue to explore for the rest of her life.

=== Progressive Education and the Walden School ===
Margaret Naumburg’s entry into the field of education marked a transformative contribution to progressive schooling in the United States. Although she initially resisted the profession due to her own negative experiences with traditional classrooms, she emerged as a pioneering educational theorist who fused psychoanalytic insight, somatic learning, and creative expression into a new model of child-centered education.

Naumburg opened The Children’s School in 1914 in New York City. Initially housed at the Leete School on East 60th Street, it began as a Montessori-inspired kindergarten that expanded grade by grade. By 1921–1922, at the request of her older students, it was renamed The Walden School, signaling its deeper alignment with Thoreauvian values of individuality, nature, and self-reliance.

The school’s curriculum was profoundly interdisciplinary. Drawing from her training with Maria Montessori in Rome in 1913, Naumburg adapted sensory-based and developmental methods but moved away from Montessori’s authoritarianism. Instead, she synthesized influences from psychoanalysis, the Alexander Technique, Dalcroze Eurhythmics, and Alys Bentley’s work on movement and rhythm. Her pedagogical emphasis shifted toward emotional and symbolic expression, kinesthetic awareness, and relational attunement.

Psychoanalytic theory formed the foundation of Walden’s educational philosophy. After undergoing Jungian analysis with Beatrice Hinkle, and later Freudian analysis with A.A. Brill, Naumburg encouraged all Walden teachers—including her sister Florence Cane, who directed the school’s art program—to pursue their own analyses. This emphasis on self-understanding was considered essential for fostering affective and creative development in students.

Naumburg believed children would not only acquire knowledge but learn how to use knowledge to their advantage. She believed understanding yourself was so important that she encouraged her staff at the school to undergo psychoanalysis.

Up to the present time, education has missed the real significance of the child's behavior by treating surface actions as isolated conditions. Having failed to recognize the true sources of behavior, it has been unable effectively to correct and guide the impulses of human growth.... The new advances in psychology, however, provide a key to the real understanding of what makes a child tick.

The school was deeply embedded in the New York bohemian and intellectual milieu of the 1910s and 1920s. Many notable individuals taught at the Walden School including Lewis Mumford, Hendrik van Loon, her sister Florence Cane, and Ernest Bloch. Drawing inspiration from this environment, Naumburg’s curriculum rejected rote learning in favor of methods that privileged inner life, spontaneity, and symbolic exploration. Art and music were not treated as peripheral subjects but as central, therapeutic modes of learning. Florence Cane’s art program, heavily influenced by Jungian symbolism and creative unconscious expression, would become foundational to art therapy’s early formation.

Though Naumburg briefly included the Alexander Technique in her vision for educational reform, her efforts to integrate it system-wide were thwarted by F. M. Alexander’s critique of “free expression” schools, including Walden itself. Nonetheless, she maintained the Technique within Walden’s curriculum, and its principles continued to influence music education at Juilliard and beyond through her network of educators.

In 1922, following the birth of her son Thomas and amid the disintegration of her marriage to author Waldo Frank, Naumburg began to withdraw from day-to-day operations. She formally resigned as director in 1924, though she remained involved in an advisory capacity and was always acknowledged as the school’s founder in its publications.

Her 1928 book The Child and the World: Dialogues in Modern Education synthesized her experiences at Walden and critiqued mechanistic, disciplinary models of schooling. Through fictional dialogues, it articulated a bold educational philosophy: one in which the unconscious, imagination, bodily awareness, and relational freedom were not only validated but cultivated as central to human development.

=== Early Founder of Art Therapy in the United States ===
Margaret Naumburg’s second major career—emerging after her departure from the Walden School in the mid-1920s—would come to define her enduring legacy as one of the founders of art therapy in the United States. Her shift toward therapeutic work began in the 1930s, following a period of personal transformation and spiritual exploration that included time in the Gurdjieff movement and collaboration with trance medium Eileen Garrett. While she had no formal clinical training at the time, Naumburg’s background in psychology, her immersion in psychoanalytic literature, and her experience as an educator positioned her to approach therapy from a symbolically and developmentally informed perspective.

Drawing on psychoanalysis, progressive education, spiritual inquiry, and creative expression, Naumburg pioneered what she later termed dynamically oriented art therapy, a therapeutic method centered on the projection of unconscious material through spontaneous artmaking. This approach, her main contribution to the art therapy community, promotes " the release of spontaneous imagery" from the client through the symbols drawn and free association of the artworks. Naumburg believed that this release of imagery acted as a way to connect with the unconscious mind. Naumburg also viewed art therapy as a distinctive form of psychotherapy. While she recognized how art therapy was built off of Freud's ideas, she perceived it as adopting a more active modality, with immediate expression, compared to talk therapy. She was also sympathetic to Jungian notions of universal symbolism and Harry Stack Sullivan's ideas about interpersonal psychiatry. Building off the work of Freud and Jung, Naumburg explored the inner personal meaning of symbols. Specifically, she explored the roots of expression through "recurrent symbols" and "recurrent use of similar technics" (Naumburg, p. 437). However, Naumburg insisted that the only valid interpretation of anyone's art came from the creator. She was skeptical of simple or rigid approaches to symbolic meaning, which was consistent with Freud's teaching about dream analysis. Naumburg wrote "when art teachings are routine it discourages efforts at spontaneous and creative expression forcing pupils to recreate what they already know is good." (Naumburg, 1973, p. 137).

Naumburg's directive of choice was scribble drawing. Naumburg used large sheets of paper and allowed the patient to move their chosen material, paint or chalk pastel, around the page until satisfied but asked that the material not be lifted from the page from start to finish. After the drawing is created the drawer is then allowed to look at the artwork and try to create another form from the scribble. The client is encouraged to move the page around until an image is found. Once an image is seen in the scribble drawing, or painting, they are asked to color it in. At this point if the client wants to talk about the artwork while creating, they are encouraged to do so. This technique can also be done with the eyes closed. Closing the eyes encourages the creator to become less inhibited to force a form from the free flowing lines. Another way of using this technique is to use the nondominant hand. This forces the creator to use another part of the brain hopefully releasing the unconscious mind to form the symbolic imagery needed to gain access to more insight of the self. Scribble drawing was developed by her sister Florence Cane. She used this technique believing it helped release unconscious imagery.

Dynamically Oriented Art Therapy is based on recognizing that man's fundamental thoughts and feelings come from the unconscious. Often thoughts and feelings are reached through expression in images rather than words. Like psychoanalytic procedures, images may deal with dreams, fantasies, daydreams, fears, conflicts and memories. Whether trained or untrained individuals have the capacity to project their inner conflicts into visual form. In this approach, the therapist withholds interpretation encouraging clients to discover what their picture means to them. It was important to Naumburg to avoid interpreting or commenting on the client's artwork so the client would not change their mind about what was created and to avoid being wrong. Naumburg used art as the means for clients to visually project their conflicts, and when it was too difficult for the client to relax, she would provide them with art lessons or specific directive projects instead.

Between 1941 and 1947 Naumburg worked at the New York State Psychiatric Institute with adults and children. She later published a series of case studies where she used art for diagnosis and therapy in the institution. However, she was unique in this endeavor because she was using it as a primary agent rather than an auxiliary tool. Rather than using art to reinforce cognitive or behavioral aims, Naumburg encouraged unstructured expression—drawing, painting, and sculpting—as a means to access emotional conflicts and symbolic processes. She recorded these sessions with meticulous attention to the children’s imagery, verbal associations, and shifts in behavior.

This work culminated in her 1947 monograph Studies of the "Free" Art Expression of Behavior Problem Children and Adolescents as a Means of Diagnosis and Therapy, published in the Nervous and Mental Disease Monographs series. It is widely recognized as the first formal American text on art therapy. She later republished it with a new introduction in 1973 as An Introduction to Art Therapy.

Naumburg subsequently extended her research to include adolescent girls diagnosed with schizophrenia and adult patients experiencing neurotic conflict. These case-based inquiries formed the basis for Schizophrenic Art (1950), Psychoneurotic Art (1953), and Dynamically Oriented Art Therapy (1966)—a trilogy that combined vivid case material with evolving theoretical reflections. In these texts, Naumburg presented art as a primary form of symbolic speech, through which clients could express inner experiences more directly than through verbal language. She asserted that therapists should not impose interpretation, but instead support the patient's own discovery of meaning through their images and associations.

Her approach was psychoanalytically grounded but eclectically practiced. She drew from both Freudian and Jungian frameworks, integrating a sensitivity to archetypes, developmental stages, and the reparative potential of imaginative play. Though she maintained rigorous clinical standards, she resisted institutional conformity and remained professionally unaffiliated until receiving licensure as a psychologist in 1961.

Naumburg’s pedagogical efforts were equally foundational. In the 1950s, she began offering public lectures, informal seminars, and exhibitions of client artwork. By 1958, she was teaching formal courses in the Psychology Department at New York University, followed by appointments at the New School for Social Research after NYU declined to reappoint her in 1965. These courses, which often attracted teachers, therapists, and occupational therapy professionals, introduced a generation of students to the therapeutic potential of spontaneous visual expression.

The American Art Therapy Association (AATA) recognized her pinnacle achievements with art as therapy with the highest honor by giving her the first Honorary Life Membership award. She was awarded the honor in 1971. She taught art therapy at undergraduate level at New York University. She successfully lobbied for the creation of a graduate level program at the university that began in 1969. Naumburg taught into her eighties. She died in 1983 at the age of 92.

=== Legacy ===
Margaret Naumburg’s legacy spans two foundational contributions to 20th-century thought and practice: the creation of a psychologically attuned model of progressive education, and the establishment of art therapy as a clinical discipline in the United States. Across both domains, her work was rooted in a radical conviction that inner life matters—that the unconscious, the symbolic, and the creative must not be suppressed, but invited, witnessed, and made meaningful.

In education, she broke from rote instruction and moral discipline, offering instead a model of schooling that prioritized self-expression, emotional insight, and relational autonomy. At the Walden School, Naumburg integrated psychoanalysis, somatic practices, and the arts into a coherent educational philosophy decades ahead of its time.

In art therapy, she offered a new method of accessing and engaging the unconscious through image-making as a distinct and autonomous form of communication. Her concept of dynamically oriented art therapy emphasized that symbolic content emerges from within the client and should be explored, not decoded. This approach continues to influence psychodynamic art therapy, particularly in its emphasis on nonverbal processes, image-based insight, and respect for the client’s interpretive authority.

Naumburg’s legacy also lives in the countless practitioners she taught, mentored, and inspired. Despite facing institutional exclusion, gendered skepticism, and professional marginalization, she built a life’s work that continues to shape fields she helped invent. She taught without a blueprint, published without a discipline, and insisted on the legitimacy of what had not yet been named.

And yet, her life also reflects the contradictions of her era: she was expansive in theory but often guarded in relationships, fiercely protective of her vision yet hesitant to collaborate widely. As colleagues and students have recalled, her sharp intellect was matched by intense solitude, and her dedication to her work often came at personal cost. Still, her impact is undeniable. Margaret Naumburg created spaces where freedom, expression, and transformation were not only possible but necessary.

== Books ==
- The child and the world: Dialogues in modern education. (1928). New York: Harcourt, Brace. Digitized October 29, 2007. OCLC 498818045
- Studies of the "Free" Expression of Behavior Problem Children as a Means of Diagnosis and Therapy, Publisher Coolidge Foundation, 1947 – Art ISBN 9780807724255
- Schizophrenic Art: Its Meaning in Psychotherapy (1950) OCLC 1253430
- Psychoneurotic Art, Its Function in Psychotherapy: correlation of the patient's Rorschach and other tests with the patient's art productions, by Adolpf G. Woltmann., Published 1953 OCLC 488744997
- Dynamically Oriented Art Therapy: Its Principles and Practice. (1966). New York: Grune & Stratton. Republished 1987, Chicago: Magnolia Street, ISBN 0-9613309-1-0
- An Introduction to Art Therapy: Studies of the "Free" Art Expression of Behavior Problem Children and Adolescents as Means of Diagnosis and Therapy (Copyright 1950 and 1973 by Margaret Naumburg). Foreword to the first edition by Nolan D. C. Lewis, M.D. New York: Teachers College Press, Columbia University. Library of Congress Catalogue Card Number 73-78074 ISBN 9780807724255

== See also ==
- Sigmund Freud
- Carl Jung
- Edward Adamson
- Adrian Hill
- Edith Kramer

== External sources ==
- "Search Margaret Naumberg papers at the University of Pennsylvania Libraries". franklin.library.upenn.edu. Archived from the original on October 1, 2021.
