= Randolph Perkins =

American politician

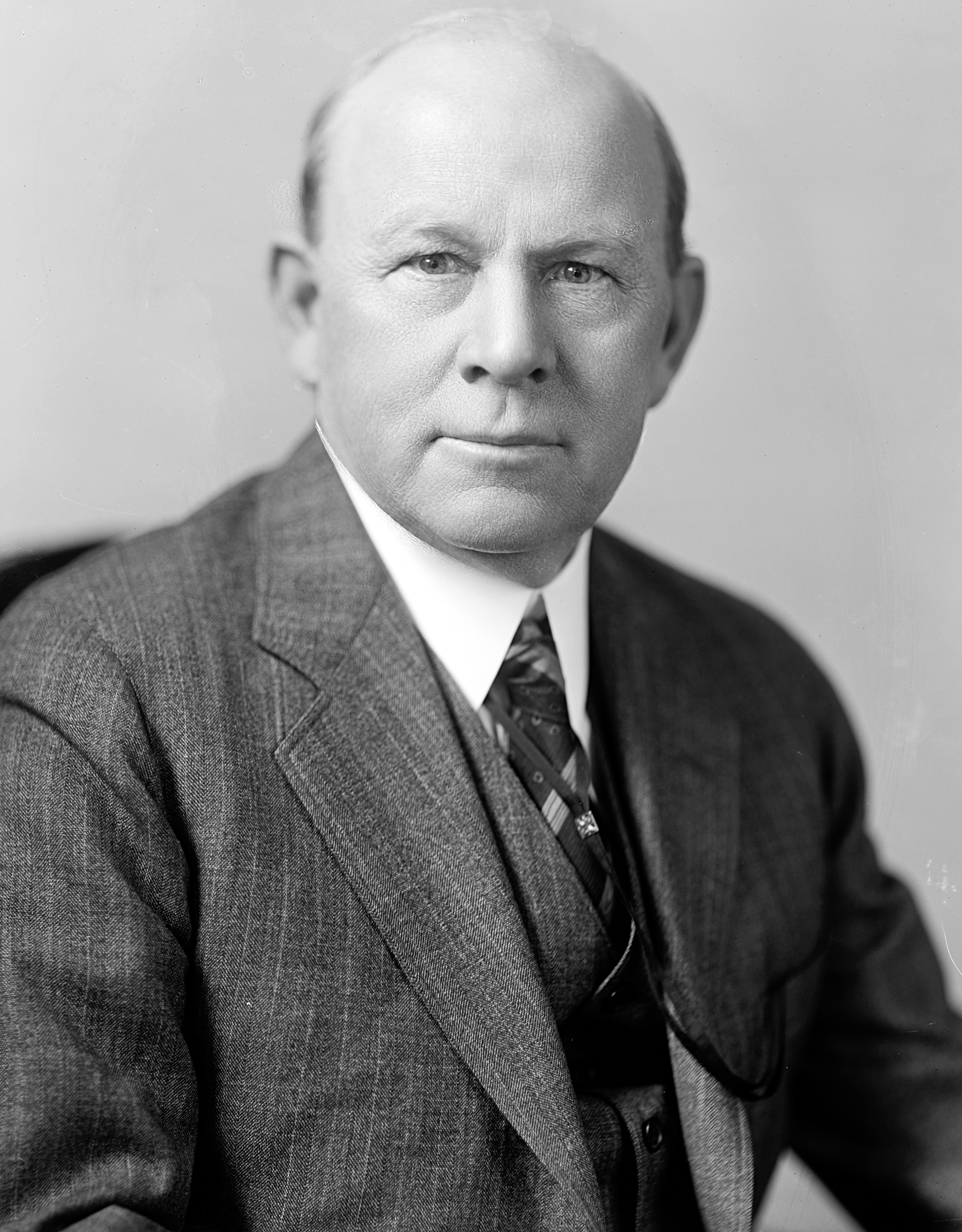

Member of the U.S. House of Representatives from New Jersey's 7th district
- In office March 4, 1921 – May 25, 1936
- Preceded by: John R. Ramsey
- Succeeded by: J. Parnell Thomas
- Constituency: 6th district (1921–33); 7th district (1933–36)
House positions
Ranking Member of the House Committee on World War Veterans' Legislation
In office 1935 – May 25, 1936
Ranking Member of the House Judiciary Committee
In office 1935 – May 25, 1936
Ranking Member of the House Committee on Patents
In office 1933 – May 25, 1936
18th Chair of the House Committee on Coinage, Weights, and Measures
In office 1923–1931
Preceded by	Albert Henry Vestal
Succeeded by	Andrew Lawrence Somers

Member of the New Jersey General Assembly
- In office 1905–1911

Mayor of Westfield
- In office 1903–1905

Personal details
- Born: Randolph Perkins; November 30, 1871 Dunellen, New Jersey, U.S.
- Died: May 25, 1936 (aged 64) Washington, D.C., U.S.
- Resting place: Fairview Cemetery, West New Brighton, Staten Island
- Party: Republican
- Education: Jersey City High School
- Alma mater: Cooper Union
- Occupation: Politician

Randolph Perkins (November 30, 1871 – May 25, 1936) was an American lawyer and Republican Party politician who represented New Jersey in the United States House of Representatives from 1921 to 1936.

== Early life ==
Born in Dunellen, New Jersey, Perkins moved to Jersey City, New Jersey, with his parents in 1879, where he attended Jersey City High School (since renamed William L. Dickinson High School). He attended Cooper Union in New York City.

=== Early career ===
After studying law, he was admitted to the bar in 1893 and commenced practice in Jersey City, New Jersey.

He moved to Westfield, New Jersey, in 1902, and served as Mayor from 1903 to 1905. He moved to Woodcliff Lake, New Jersey, in 1909, and continued the practice of law. He served as member of the New Jersey General Assembly from 1905 to 1911, serving as speaker in 1907. He served as chairman of the Bergen County Republican committee from 1911 to 1916.

== Congress ==
Perkins was elected as a Republican to the Sixty-seventh and to the seven succeeding Congresses and served from March 4, 1921, until his death. He served as chairman of the Committee on Coinage, Weights, and Measures (Sixty-ninth through Seventy-first Congresses). He was renominated for election to the Seventy-fifth Congress at the time of his death.

=== Impeachment manager ===
He was one of the managers appointed by the House of Representatives in 1933 to prosecute the case in the impeachment trial of Harold Louderback, judge of the United States District Court for the Northern District of California, and again in 1936 to conduct the impeachment proceedings against Halsted L. Ritter, judge of the United States District Court for the Southern District of Florida.

== Death ==
He died in Washington, D.C., on May 25, 1936, after suffering a kidney infection. He was interred in Fairview Cemetery, West New Brighton, Staten Island, New York.

== Electoral history ==
=== United States House of Representatives ===
United States House of Representatives elections, 1934
Party	Candidate	Votes	%	±%
Republican	Randolph Perkins (incumbent)	47,083	51.35	▼0.21
Democratic	Hamilton Cross	43,771	47.73	▲0.45
Socialist	John Hoverman	608	0.66	
Communist	Simon Saller	237	0.26	
Total votes		91,699	100.0	
Republican hold				

United States House of Representatives elections, 1932
Party	Candidate	Votes	%	±%
Republican	Randolph Perkins (incumbent)	52,003	51.56	▼4.9
Democratic	Hamilton Cross	47,688	47.28	
Socialist	Ferdinand Kadel	904	0.90	
Communist	James Benjamin McBride Jr.	146	0.14	
Independent	Harold Taft Wright	72	0.07	
Socialist Labor	Emil Landgraf	48	0.05	
Total votes		100,861	100.0	
Republican hold				

United States House of Representatives elections, 1930
Party	Candidate	Votes	%	±%
Republican	Randolph Perkins (incumbent)	72,868	56.46	▼8.66
Democratic	Archibald C. Hart	55,283	42.83	
Socialist	Henry J. Cox	774	0.60	▲0.40
Communist	Charles Dzevetzko	146	0.11	
Total votes		129,071	100.0	
Republican hold				

United States House of Representatives elections, 1928
Party	Candidate	Votes	%
Republican	Randolph Perkins (incumbent)	104,303	65.12
Democratic	Frank L. Sample	55,544	34.68
Socialist	Henry J. Cox	316	0.20
Total votes		160,163	100.0
Republican hold			

== See also ==
- List of members of the United States Congress who died in office (1900–1949)

U.S. House of Representatives
Preceded by John R. Ramsey	Member of the U.S. House of Representatives from New Jersey's 6th congressional district March 4, 1921-March 3, 1933	Succeeded by Donald H. McLean
Preceded by George N. Seger	Member of the U.S. House of Representatives from New Jersey's 7th congressional district March 4, 1933-May 25, 1936	Succeeded by J. Parnell Thomas
