= Trevor Day School =

School in New York City, USA

Coordinates: 40.782973°N 73.946770°W

Trevor Day School is an independent day school in New York City in the borough of Manhattan.

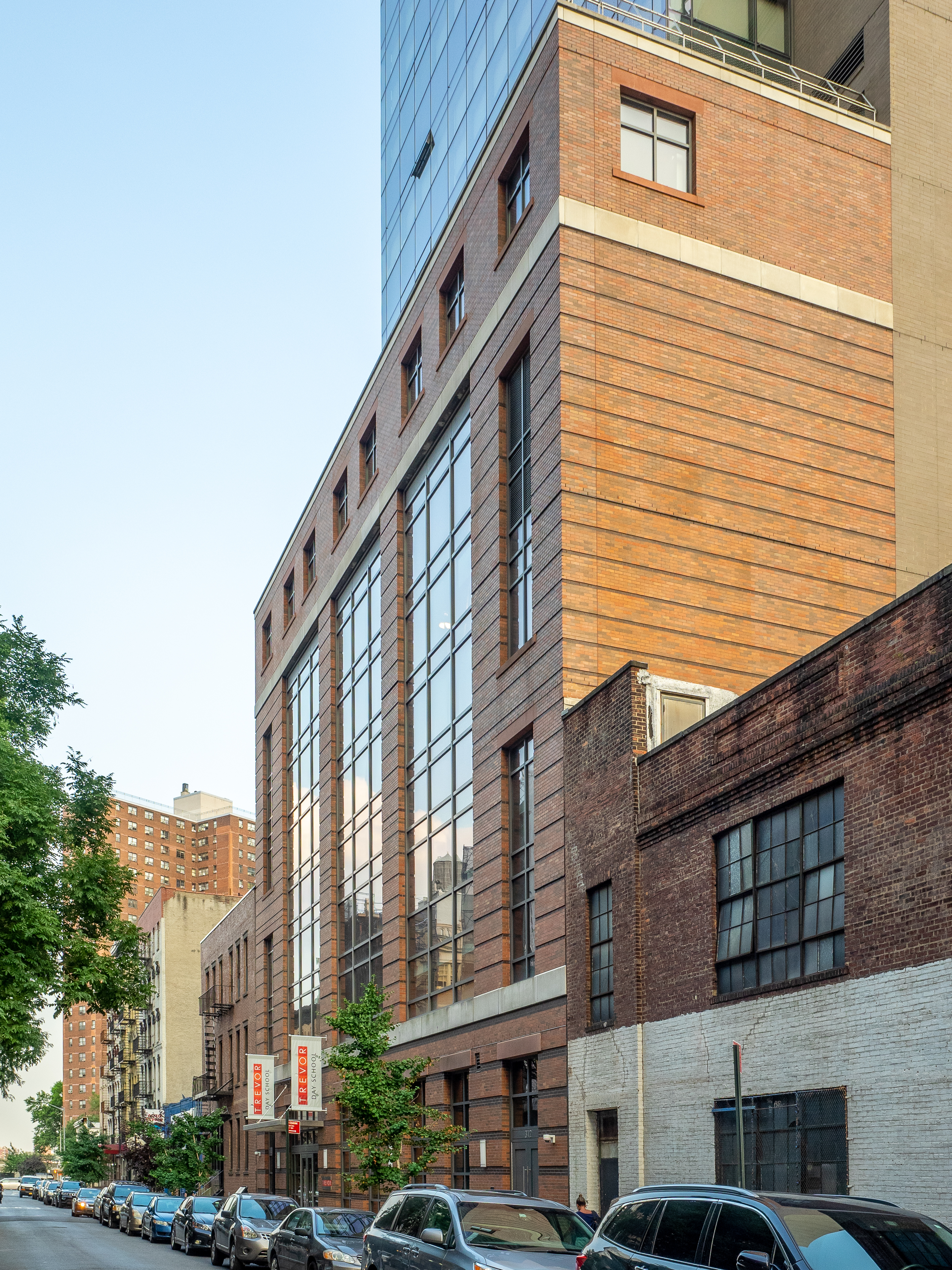
Upper Day School (2019)

== History ==
It was founded in 1930 as The Day School for the Church of the Heavenly Rest, an Episcopal church located on Fifth Avenue at 90th street. In 1997, the school was renamed in honor of the late Paul Trevor, an early Board President.

In 1991, the school took over the New Walden Lincoln School (which itself was a merger of two schools, Walden and New Lincoln) and acquired the Goodman Building at 1 West 88th Street. It refurbished the building and until May 2015 used it to house the Upper School opened for sixth through twelfth grades. The Goodman Building is now home to the Lower School for Pre K through fifth grade.

Recently, Trevor Day bought 312 East 95th Street by Ken Kal LLC, which would now be the home for the upper school. The new building, which opened in May 2015, is approximately 101,243 square-feet and 12 stories high. The new building uses a sustainable geothermal heating and cooling system that reduces energy consumption. Trevor Day School is the first school in Manhattan to use geothermal technology.

Daniel Feigin became the Head of School in July 2023.

== Notable alumni ==
- Will Janowitz, actor and writer
- Anthony Volpe, baseball player
- Leelee Sobieski, actress
