= Hermine Dudley =

American motorist (1890-19??)

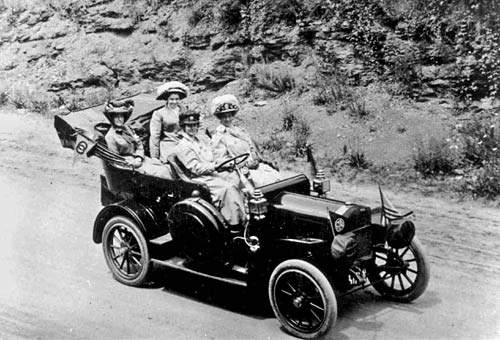
Publicity photography of automobilist Alice Huyler Ramsey with Margate Atwood, Nettie Powell and Hermine Jahns prior to their historic drive across America in summer 1909.

Hermine Dudley (née Jahns; born 1890) was an American woman who, in 1909 at age 19, accompanied Alice Huyler Ramsey when she became the first woman to drive across the United States. She later married Pendleton Dudley and was the mother of the composer Margaret Purcell and choreographer Jane Dudley.

The 1995 juvenile historical fiction book Coast to Coast with Alice is told in her voice.
