= Florence Cane =

American art educator (1882–1952)

- Born: Florence Naumburg; September 28, 1882; Manhattan, NY
- Died: 1952 (aged 69–70)
- Employer: Walden School Counseling Centre for Gifted Children at New York University
- Relatives: Margaret Naumberg

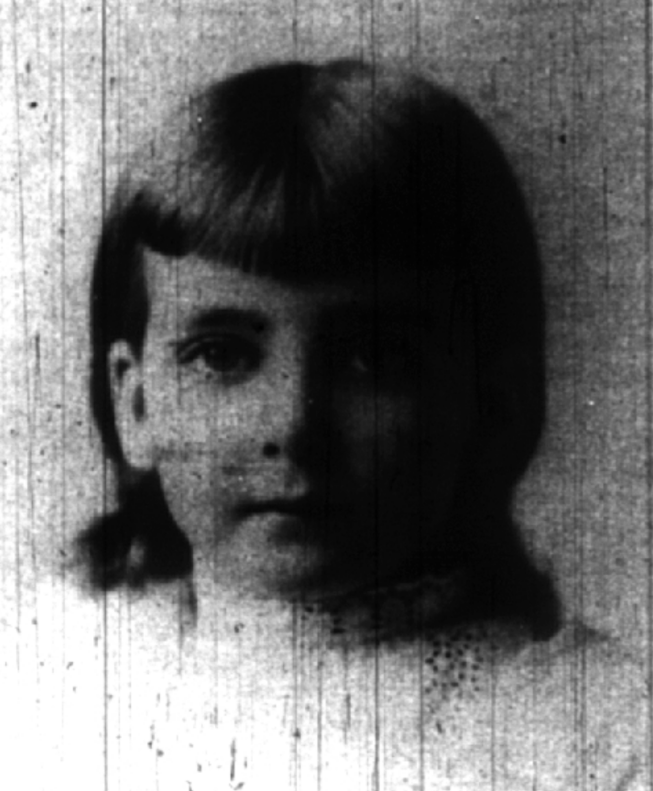

Florence Cane (September 28, 1882 – 1952) was an American art educator whose ideas influenced the field of art therapy.

== Personal life ==
Florence was born in 1882 to Max and Theresa Naumberg in 1882 in New York City. She was the second oldest of four children, and was described as having an outgoing and lively disposition. Her sister Margaret Naumburg was a pioneer of American art therapy. Growing up, Cane was exposed to poor art instruction, which inspired her to become an art teacher.

Florence married Melville Cane and had twin daughters Katherine and Mary. Cane experienced discrimination, which led her to join women's rights groups. Her husband was supportive of her intellectual and social reform interests.

She died in 1952 at the age of 70.

== Professional background ==
Florence and her sister Margaret were both inspired by psychoanalytic ideas, and pursued Jungian analysis with Beatrice Hinkle around 1910. This shaped Cane's teaching, encouraging her to look beyond mere technique to one's own emotions as a source of creativity. She was also a follower of Gurdjieff, who regarded "dance, music, movement, innovative group work and writing" as modes of expression and self-awareness. Not least, she was influenced by Eastern philosophical traditions, which informed her understanding of the connection between mind and body in the art-making process.

Margaret Naumburg established The Children's School, now known as Walden School, in 1914. Naumburg invited Cane to teach at Walden, an experimental, progressive project, around 1920. It is said that Naumburg offered her the position after Cane complained about how art was taught at the school. Cane believed, "youth deserves teachers with psychological understanding, artistic ability, and simple, direct methods of supplying techniques," and "creativity and individuality were being crushed." Cane chose to move away from the skill teaching method typically used in schools and instead used an integrated approach. While Cane taught at The Children's School, she continued to teach privately at her home. After leaving The Children's School, Cane spoke at teaching seminars and began her own school at Rockefeller Center. In 1936, Cane became the director of art at the Counseling Center for Gifted Children of the School of Education at New York University, mainly working with intake portfolios for applicants.

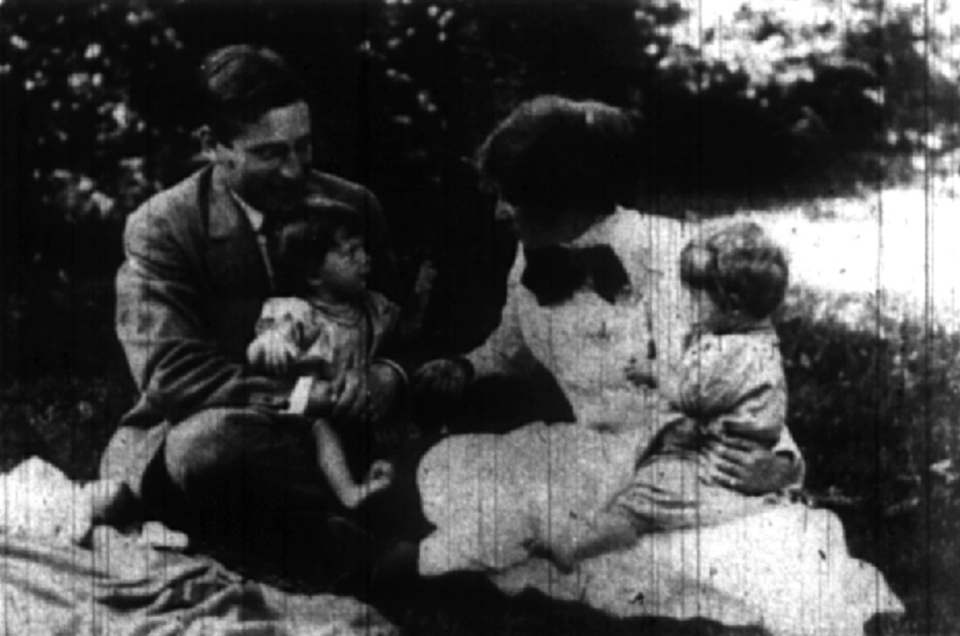
Florence Cane with her husband and two daughters.

== Contributions to art education ==
=== Publications ===
In her 1930 article, "Observations on the Creative Impulse in Very Young Children," Cane alluded to the developmental necessities and prime environments for creativity and self-exploration in 1930. Other publications include The gifted child in art (1936); an article in the Journal of Educational Sociology, Art-The Child's Birthright (1931a) and Earliest School Approaches (1931b) in The American Magazine of Art.

Cane's book The Artist in Each of Us was published in 1951, a year before her death. The book covered topics such as instructions appropriate for each age group, the selection of materials, specific techniques, and the importance of symbols. Its reprinting in 1983 was spearheaded by Mary Cane Robinson, Elinor Ulman, and Claire Levy.

=== Precursor to the Expressive Therapies Continuum ===
Her early development of expressing the unconscious through movement, emotion, and thought functions place her as precursor to the Expressive Therapies Continuum.

Cane's progressive ideas drew on the importance of art being a complex process that serves as a holistic experience. She believed that the movement beyond the typical stationary range would invoke the artwork with more meaning. She further elaborated the use of movement in her article (Cane, 1931a) by saying that the "kinesthetic sense is the link between conceiving and doing" and "the finger tips are...the last delicate part to convey the message of the mind to the paper...(carrying) the whole burden." She insisted that the lack of movement expression could block the artist's creative capabilities, and insisted on finding balance between the three functions for better wholeness and sense of self. This is another aspect of her contributions, identifying art as a healing process capable of revealing the unconscious.

Movement is the kinesthetic sense that each person possesses. This can be expressed in the principle of rhythm. Cane states that everywhere in the world there is rhythm, functioning as a basic principle of life, and having rhythm can help release motor functions and help the individual liberate his or her feelings. The simplest form of rhythm is the use of repetition. Feeling, another chief function, can bring creative faculty. Feeling is dynamic and harmonious in creating art. Feeling can come from many different avenues like memory and imagination. The last chief function, thought, is linked to the idea of balance of the outlets of power. Cane referred to these as human powers "body, psyche, and mind" that cohesively worked in an individual's creative expression. These include vision, observations, memories, imagination, and understanding. With all of the chief functions, movement, feeling, and thought, working together, the individual can experience the last dimension spiritual awakening. This process is call integration.

=== The scribble technique ===
Cane developed a scribble technique as "a kind of play with a freely flowing continuous line". The first step is to draw a line after doing some stretching warmups. In the second step, the artist looks at the line to find a form or an association, and then elaborates upon it.

When drawing the scribble, the eyes can be opened or closed. However, keeping the eyes closed helps the artist move freely without trying to direct the hand. Cane developed this exercise to foster imagination and unconscious imagery, similar to free association in psychoanalysis.

The Cane warmup movements and scribble technique were later incorporated into a notable art therapy assessment, the Ulman Personality Assessment Procedure.

== Therapeutic approach ==
=== Therapeutic setting, population, and practice ===
Cane was trained under the psychoanalytic theoretical orientation and it is the baseline to her expressive therapies approaches. Cane's integrated teaching approach involved emotional creativity and free association. Cane considered herself to be a psychologically-informed art teacher, not an art therapist. However, Cane had patients referred to her by psychiatrists and analysts who were aware of the importance of art imagery as a therapeutic tool. In Cane's book The artist in each of us, she expressed the importance of recognizing symbols in a child's artwork. Cane believed that once symbols are made known to the art therapist-teacher, it can be easier to determine the child's issues and needs.

Cane believed that children go through stages and with the right positive reinforcement they are able to create and express themselves. In her belief, the first stage was called the nursery period. Cane stated that babies should be left alone with materials like pebbles, sticks, and leaves so they can explore the world and become more autonomous. Then, once the child becomes adjusted to the art material, they will start to create. In this stage the 2–3-year-old is doing sensory muscular activities. The child, till the age of seven, is in the scribbling phase. They will find enjoyment in this muscular activity and will explore shape and color. The child will be working and drawing in the one dimension. From the ages 7 to 14 they will seek approval from others. They will begin to look at the world around them and want to replicate it. They will also be working in two dimensions. From ages 14–18 the adolescence will begin to have a deepening consciousness and emotions will be expressed more. They will also be very self-critical of themselves. During this time they will become aware of the third dimension. Cane believed that this was the process of human development in expressive art therapy.

About her students, Cane said, "My work with the children is based on the belief that almost any little child can learn to draw or paint as naturally as to speak or write" (1931b). She reinforced the importance of developing and expressing identity through the creative process, and cautioned other adults with their interactions with creative children (1931a). It is critical for the parents and caretakers to be supportive. She described adults as being more conventional and precise with expectations for the product to have a finished quality, while the child does not. Childhood is described as a time when imagination is alive. A child uses his strokes on a page as "shorthand symbols for what he wants them to be" (1931a). If the parent or caretaker is not supportive, for example frowning at the work or laughing at it, this will cause the child to lose confidence. When a child displays imaginative, self-expressive work for the critical adult, condemnation of the piece's technical efficiency is actually condemnation of the child. This in turn might make the children not express themselves creatively anymore. Instead, we should, "ask him about it with interest, and let the encouragement be in proportion to what it means to the child" (1931a). Praise should be just enough to sustain his belief in his efforts.

Her theories also included external conditions and materials. Cane held the belief that Teachers are in charge of ensuring optimal conditions for creativity to flourish. The conditions Cane believed to be most favorable for children were white, bare walls; spacious, lighted rooms; and visible materials. Worried that her students would feel a sense of inferiority, she would not allow famous reproductions to be hung in the space. In her 1930 publication as she felt the comparison may be damaging to her students' self-esteem and original creative process. Later in her 1950 publication of The Artist in Each of Us, Cane retracted the statement that studio walls should be bare suggesting walls should be adorned with children's artwork. Sometimes some of the most "living" of the children's artwork would adorn the walls, those that she identified of being full of rhythm, color, and honest crudities that exemplified the effort put into them (1931a). Other decorations were used for specific directives and were typically brightly colored materials that were used for stimuli.

Cane preferred crayons, chalks, tempera paint, and charcoal, believing these tools facilitated art that was "more broad and individual"., and supported children's freedom of thought and movement.

Cane suggested the first art directive for any individual should involve a "full, balanced movement" such as throwing a ball or playfully producing lines. Moving the body with ease while making art could help children build trust in creating and exploring their kinesthetic senses through activities involving perception, memory, and imagination. These activities included observing objects, recalling the objects observed without looking, and thinking of new material and imagery.

=== Preferred style and technique ===
Cane, through her years working with children and adolescence, discovered common difficulties among the children she worked with. The difficulties the children had, like fear, pride and inertia, often caused a creative block and were usually underlying symptoms of a psychological attitude. She believed that the students who were experiencing difficulties in academic, artistic, or behavioral areas were experiencing a block in one of her proposed three functions. She believed helping the students through this blocked area could get them to a broader range of expression and understanding. Cane discussed the fact that this improvement in function was consistent with significant improvements within such students' artwork. The artist also developed more personal meaning from the artwork and felt rejuvenated through the art making process.

Inertia, or resistance, is often due to a lack of psychic energy. The reason for a lack of energy for art activities, is because the child's energy is spent doing other things. This energy can be spent on problems at home or school, or if the child has a busy schedule. Cane found a way to break through the inertia and help the child get past the creative block. One way Cane got past the child's block, was by giving the child a previous, unfinished drawing. The child can then look at the unfinished drawing and decide how to finish it. The hope is that when the child is finished with the drawing, there will be enough energy to begin a new piece of art.

Fear can also cause a creative block. When a child is fearful, safety becomes an issue and the child may become hostile or develop feelings of guilt. Cane would give a fearful child a simple art activity that was easily executed so that the child could feel satisfaction. If the art activity was too difficult, the child would get discouraged and become afraid of failure. Cane developed the scribble method as a way to get through the creative block and be satisfied with the artwork. The scribble is the child's own design and can't be compared to anyone else's.

Children can have two types of pride. They can have pride that causes conceitedness or the type of pride that causes feelings of inferiority. Cane's approach to conceited pride was to not give the children what they wanted. Cane would not give the child rewards or praise for their artwork. The reason for this was to break the child from making artwork solely for attention. Cane approached the children with inferiority pride in a different way. Cane noticed children with inferiority pride were afraid to create artwork that was less than perfect. Cane used art activities, like the scribble method, to give the children satisfaction in their artwork.

Other important aspects of the art making effort include encouraging the student artist to select his own ideas for subject matter. These decisions will be related to his feelings and interest, and thus, he will have more of a desire to be engaged with the art-making process (Cane, 1931a). Also notable is when the time is right to intervene for a teaching moment. While students are enthusiastically engaged with the process, they are busy actively conveying what is in their minds into the form. Cane says "and who can tell but the artist himself what he means to do and how he is going to do it" (1931a). Instead, wait for lulls and times of discouragement, for these are the times when the students will be more receptive and willing to learn.

== Personal art ==
Photographs of Cane's work can be found in the 1983 publication "Roots of Art Therapy" in the American Journal of Art Therapy. In her personal art, Cane created large pieces with the use of her entire body. One of her most notable pieces was in response to Bach's B Minor Mass. In which she used painted on a large-scale surface. This was so she was able to use both arms to create a rhythmic pattern. She started the painting down by her feet, pushed the lines upward towards the sky, and then outward with both arms. Cane titled the finished piece "Credo". Credo reflects her value of kinesthetic experience in artmaking and rhythmic movement inspired by Bach's B Minor Mass.

She found that there was a heightened emotional connection for the external expression on a larger-scale. Visually it had instinctively formed in her mind while listening to the music, and then later while creating. She found that larger paper allowed more freedom for movement through use of the whole body. "...[L]arge, free movements in drawing released images in my mind that I had been unable to express on a small scale."
