= Judith Rapoport =

American psychiatrist (1933–2026)

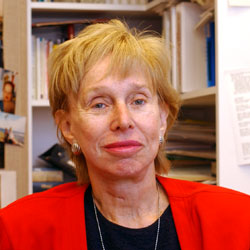
- Rapoport in 2015
- Born: Judith Helen Livant; July 12, 1933; New York City, U.S.
- Died: March 7, 2026 (aged 92); Washington, D.C., U.S.
- Education: Swarthmore College; Harvard Medical School
- Awards: Blanche F. Ittleson Award for Research in Child Psychiatry (1987); Presidential Meritorious Executive Rank Award (1991); American Psychiatric Association Award for Research (1992); Ruane Prize for Outstanding Achievement in Child and Adolescent Psychiatric Research (2002); Edward M. Scolnick Prize in Neuroscience (2005)
- Scientific career
- Fields: Child Psychiatry; Attention Deficit Hyperactivity Disorder; Obsessive Compulsive Disorder; Childhood Onset Schizophrenia
- Workplaces: National Institute of Mental Health

Judith Helen Livant Rapoport (née Livant; July 12, 1933 – March 7, 2026) was an American psychiatrist. She was the chief of the Child Psychiatry Branch at the National Institute of Mental Health (NIMH), part of the National Institutes of Health (NIH) in Bethesda, Maryland.

Her research focused on diagnosis in child psychiatry, attention deficit hyperactivity disorder (ADHD), and obsessive–compulsive disorder (OCD). Rapoport's research group at NIMH also studies clinical phenomenology, neurobiology, and treatment of childhood-onset schizophrenia.

Rapoport was the author of the bestselling book, The Boy Who Couldn't Stop Washing: The Experience and Treatment of Obsessive–Compulsive Disorder (Plume, 1989), about obsessive–compulsive disorder.

== Early life and education ==
Judith Helen Livant was born In Manhattan on July 12, 1933. She attended the progressive Walden School. In 1955, she received her Bachelor of Arts degree, graduating Phi Beta Kappa and magna cum laude from Swarthmore College in Swarthmore, Pennsylvania. She received her medical degree in 1959 from Harvard Medical School in Boston, Massachusetts.

Rapoport completed training at the National Children's Hospital in Washington, D.C., and the Karolinska University Hospital in Stockholm, Sweden. She completed internships at Mount Sinai Hospital (Manhattan) in New York, New York, and psychiatric residencies at Massachusetts Mental Health Center in Boston, Massachusetts and St. Elizabeths Hospital in Washington, D.C. She received additional research training at NIMH's Laboratory of Psychology in Bethesda, Maryland.

== Career ==
Rapoport's research group at NIMH studied the clinical phenomenology, neurobiology, and treatment of childhood-onset schizophrenia.

In 1984, Rapoport was named chief of NIMH's Child Psychiatry Branch. In addition to her research at NIH, she held academic appointments in psychiatry at the George Washington University School of Medicine & Health Sciences and Georgetown University School of Medicine, both in Washington, D.C.

Rapoport was a member of a number of advisory committees of national professional medical organizations, including the National Anxiety Foundation and the American Psychopathological Association, for which she served as president. Since 1993, she also served as a member of the scientific council of the Brain & Behavior Research Foundation. Rapoport has served on the editorial boards of Advances in Clinical Child Psychiatry, The American Journal of Psychiatry, Journal of Child Psychology and Psychiatry, and others.

She also authored and coauthored several professional medical books, more than 300 scientific research papers, and more than 200 journal articles.

In the 1960s and 1970s she used school age children in drug trials at Georgetown University.

== Personal life and death ==
Rapoport was married to Stanley I. Rapoport, M.D., a neuroscientist at the National Institute on Aging who has had 19 of his research papers retracted due to scientific misconduct, whom she met at Harvard Medical School. They had two sons and four grandsons.

Rapoport died in Washington, D.C., on March 7, 2026, at the age of 92.

== Honors ==
Rapoport was a member of the National Academy of Medicine and a fellow of the American Academy of Arts and Sciences.

Some of Rapoport's honors and awards included:

- G. Burroughs Mider Lecture, National Institutes of Health, 1993
- American Psychiatric Association Award for Research, 1992
- Presidential Meritorious Executive Rank Award, 1991
- Ruane Prize for Outstanding Achievement in Child and Adolescent Psychiatric Research, Brain & Behavior Research Foundation, 2002
- Edward M. Scolnick Prize in Neuroscience, Massachusetts Institute of Technology's McGovern Institute for Brain Research, 2005
- Blanche F. Ittleson Award for Research in Child Psychiatry (1987), American Psychiatric Association.
