= Jane Dudley =

American dancer (1912–2001)

- Born: April 3, 1912; New York City, USA
- Died: September 19, 2001 (aged 89); London, United Kingdom
- Education: University of North Carolina
- Occupations: dancer, choreographer, activist
- Years active: 1932–2001
- Spouse: Leo Hurwitz
- Parents: Pendleton Dudley (father); Hermine Dudley (mother)
- Relatives: Margaret Purcell (sister)

Jane Dudley (April 3, 1912 – September 19, 2001) was an American modern dancer, choreographer, and teacher. Inspired by her mentor, choreographer Martha Graham, Dudley helped bring her movement inspired by social ills to the American Dance Festival at Connecticut College in the 1950s.

== Biography ==
Dudley was born in New York City on April 3, 1912. She was the daughter of Pendleton Dudley and Hermine Jahns, older sister of Margaret Purcell, and attended the Walden School in New York City. While attending the Walden School, Dudley was inspired by artists, creative thinkers, and dancers to pursue her passion for dance. Following her graduation from the Walden School, Dudley went on to study dance with Hanya Holm, Louis Horst, and Martha Graham. In 1935, Dudley first met Martha Graham at the Bennington Summer Course and performed in a piece titled "Panorama" with the Martha Graham Company. It was not until 1936 that she performed as part of its main stage company. During her time with the dance company, Dudley was inspired by Graham's work rooted in political ideas and its fast movements. It was also during this time that she was inspired to write about her experiences during the Great Depression as a performer.

== Dudley-Maslow-Bales trio ==
In 1942, Dudley and Sophie Maslow both students of Martha Graham formed a dance a trio with William Bales. The trio performed all over the United States including cities such as, Baltimore, New Orleans, and Washington D.C. A piece titled Vagary was staged and performed in 1949 at The American Dance Festival. John Martin, of The New York Times said of Dudley's performance in 1949, "At any rate, she moves so beautifully and with such superhuman control that just to watch her is in itself a delight, let the intention be what it will." The choreography of the trio was and is still seen as representative of the 1940s as it featured folk music and captured the American spirit of the era. Writer David Wood argues that Jane Dudley's "choreography was always a pleasure to perform, but more for the doing of the movement itself than its content or its form." In 1954, the trio split up and Dudley continued to choreograph and shape American dance.

== Solo career ==
Following the trios end, Dudley returned to Bennington College in the 1960s and by 1968, she had become the artistic director for Betsheva Dance Company. Two years later, in 1970, Dudley moved to London and continued performing as director of the London Contemporary Dance School. She married and later divorced filmmaker Leo Hurwitz with whom she had one son. Jane Dudley died in September 2001 at the age of 89 in London.
