= J. Parnell Thomas =

American politician (1895–1970)

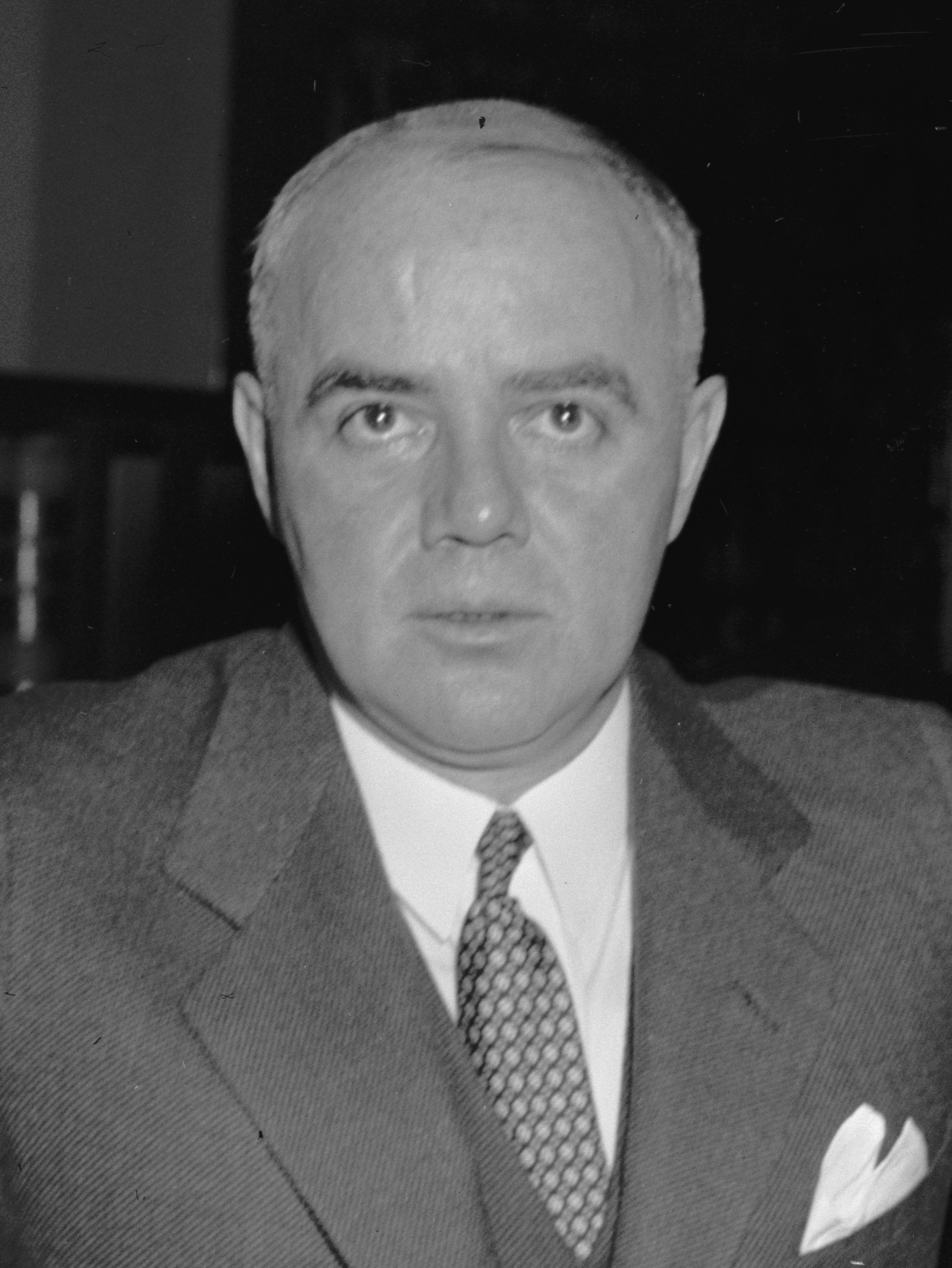

Member of the U.S. House of Representatives from New Jersey's 7th district
- In office January 3, 1937 – January 2, 1950
- Preceded by: Randolph Perkins
- Succeeded by: William B. Widnall

Personal details
- Born: John Parnell Feeney Jr. January 16, 1895 Jersey City, New Jersey, U.S.
- Died: November 19, 1970 (aged 75) St. Petersburg, Florida, U.S.
- Resting place: Elmgrove Cemetery in Mystic, Connecticut
- Party: Republican
- Education: University of Pennsylvania

John Parnell Thomas (January 16, 1895 – November 19, 1970) was an American stockbroker and politician. He was elected to seven terms as a U.S. representative from New Jersey as a Republican, serving from 1937 to 1950.

Thomas later served nine months in federal prison for corruption. Ironically, he would serve his sentence at the same prison as two of the Hollywood Ten, whose convictions were obtained after Thomas's inquiries into the film industry.

== Early life and career ==
Born as John Parnell Feeney Jr. in Jersey City, New Jersey, he changed his name in 1919 to John Parnell Thomas. Raised Catholic, he later became an Episcopalian.

Raised in Allendale, New Jersey, he graduated in 1914 from Ridgewood High School, after which he studied at the University of Pennsylvania, where he was elected secretary of the school's sophomore class. When the United States entered World War I in 1917, he served overseas with the United States Army. Following his discharge from the military in 1919, Thomas worked in the investment securities and insurance business in New York City for the next 18 years.

He entered Allendale, New Jersey, municipal politics in 1925 and was elected councilman and then mayor of the borough from 1926 to 1930. He was elected to a two-year term to the New Jersey General Assembly in 1935. In 1936, Thomas was elected to the United States House of Representatives as a Republican Party Representative from New Jersey's 7th congressional district, filling the vacancy left by the death of Randolph Perkins. He would be re-elected six times.

== Anti-communism ==
As a U.S. Congressman, Thomas was a staunch conservative opponent of President Franklin D. Roosevelt and his New Deal, claiming the President's legislative agenda had "sabotaged the capitalist system." Thomas opposed government support for the Federal Theatre Project declaring that "practically every play presented under the auspices of the Project is sheer propaganda for Communism or the New Deal."

In 1949, Thomas called the U.S. Secretary of Defense, James Forrestal, "the most dangerous man in America" and claimed that if Forrestal were not removed from office he would "cause another world war."

== Demobilization ==
In the post-war period, Thomas called for a rapid demobilization of the American military. In 1946, he invited General Dwight Eisenhower to his office to discuss the issue. When he arrived, the general was faced with a table surrounded by soldier's wives, many holding babies. News photographers took photos of the furious Eisenhower.

== HUAC ==
After the Republican Party gained control of the 80th Congress in the November 1946 elections, Thomas was appointed chairman of the House Committee on Un-American Activities (HUAC)–during that period, also called the "Thomas Committee." In May 1947, Thomas traveled to Hollywood to meet with film industry executives with a view to exposing what he believed was Communist infiltration of motion pictures content by members of the Screen Writers Guild. Returning to Washington, D.C., he shifted the focus of the committee to what he called the "subversives" working in the film business.

Under Thomas, in October 1947, HUAC summoned suspected Communists to appear for questioning. These summonses led to the conviction and imprisonment for contempt of Congress of the "Hollywood Ten" who had refused to answer the Committee's questions, citing the First Amendment.

== Corruption charges and imprisonment ==
Prominent American columnists Jack Anderson and Drew Pearson were critical of Thomas and his committee's methods.

Rumors about corrupt practices on Thomas's part were confirmed when his secretary, Helen Campbell, sent documents to Pearson, which he used to expose Thomas's corruption in an August 4, 1948 newspaper article. The fraud had begun on New Year's Day of 1940, when Thomas placed Campbell's niece, Myra Midkiff, and Campbell's maid, Arnette Minor, on his payroll as clerks. Midkiff earned roughly $1,200 a year and was to kick back her entire salary to the Congressman. Through this practice, he would also evade a tax-bracket increase. The arrangement lasted for four years. As a result, Thomas and Campbell were summoned to answer to charges of salary fraud before a grand jury.

Thomas refused to answer questions, citing his Fifth Amendment rights, the most common stance for which he had criticized accused Communists. Indicted, Thomas was tried and convicted of fraud, fined and given an 18-month prison sentence. He resigned from Congress on January 2, 1950. Thomas was paroled after serving nine months. In an ironic twist, he was imprisoned in Danbury Prison, where Lester Cole and Ring Lardner Jr., both members of the "Hollywood Ten," were serving time due to Thomas's inquiries into the film industry.

== Post-prison ==
After his release from prison, Thomas was an editor and publisher of three weekly newspapers in Bergen County, New Jersey. President Harry S. Truman pardoned Thomas on Christmas Eve of 1952. In 1954, Thomas tried to re-enter politics, but was defeated for the Republican Party nomination for Congress.

== Death ==
Thomas died in 1970 in St. Petersburg, Florida, aged 75, of undisclosed causes. He was cremated, and his ashes were interred in the Elmgrove Cemetery in Mystic, Connecticut.

== Depictions ==
In the 2015 film Trumbo, Thomas is portrayed by James Dumont.

== See also ==
- List of American federal politicians convicted of crimes
- List of federal political scandals in the United States
- United States House of Representatives
- House Un-American Activities Committee
- List of members of the House Un-American Activities Committee

U.S. House of Representatives
Preceded by Randolph Perkins	Member of the U.S. House of Representatives from New Jersey's 7th congressional district 1937–1950	Succeeded by William B. Widnall
Preceded by Edward J. Hart	Chair of the House Un-American Activities Committee; 1947–1948	Succeeded by John Stephens Wood
