= Donald H. McLean =

American politician

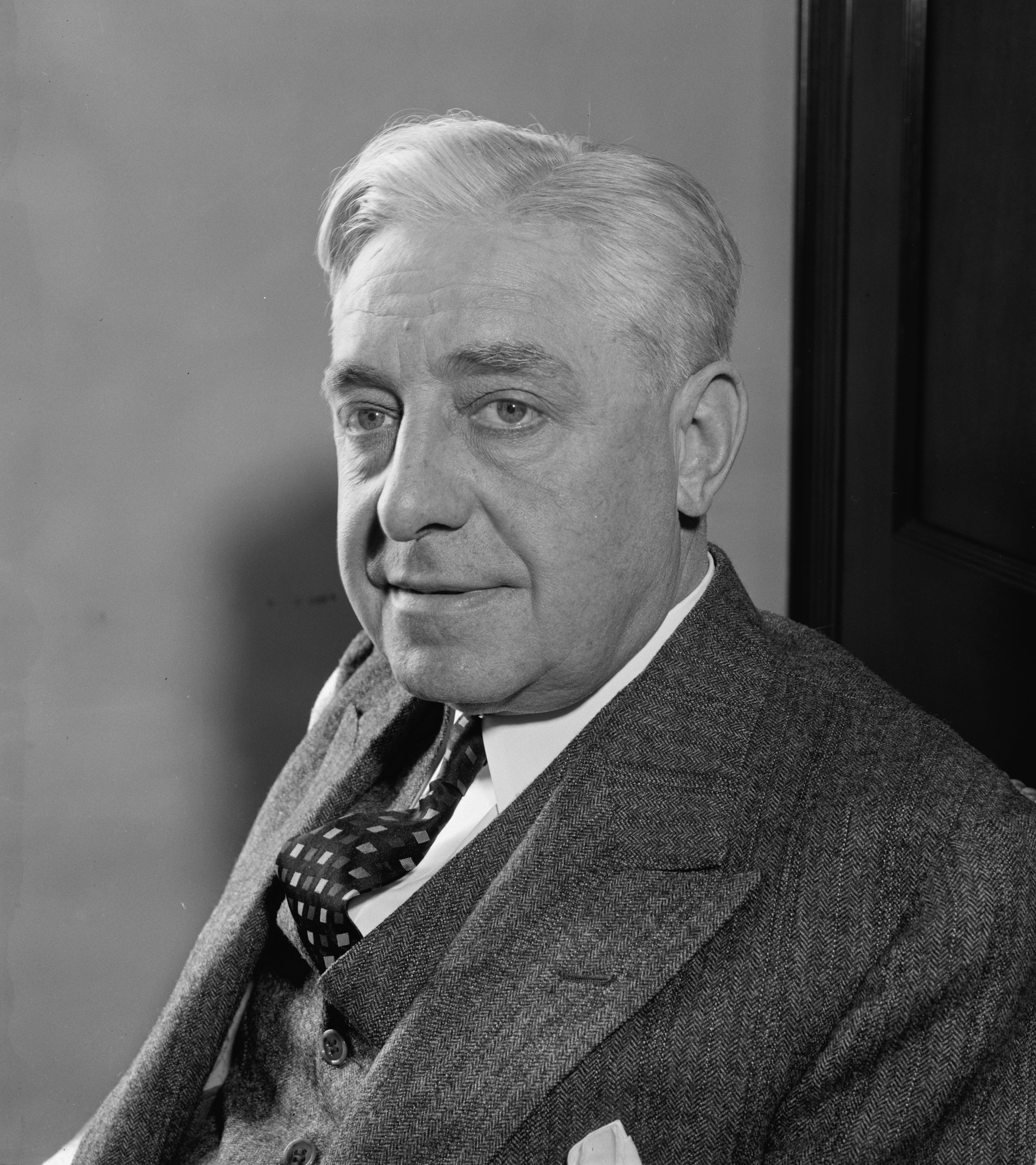

Member of the U.S. House of Representatives from New Jersey's 6th district
- In office March 4, 1933 – January 3, 1945
- Preceded by: Randolph Perkins
- Succeeded by: Clifford P. Case

Personal details
- Born: March 18, 1884 Paterson, New Jersey, U.S.
- Died: August 19, 1975 (aged 91) Burlington, Vermont, U.S.
- Party: Republican

Donald Holman McLean (March 18, 1884, Paterson, New Jersey – August 19, 1975, Burlington, Vermont) was an American Republican Party politician who represented New Jersey's 6th congressional district in the United States House of Representatives from 1933 to 1945.

Born in Paterson, New Jersey on March 18, 1884, McLean attended the city's public schools. He graduated from the law department of George Washington University in Washington, D.C. in 1906, where he had been a member of Phi Sigma Kappa fraternity. McLean served as a page in the United States Senate from 1897–1902 and was secretary to U.S. Senator John Kean from 1902-1911. McLean was admitted to the bar in 1909 and commenced practice in Elizabeth, New Jersey. He was special master in chancery of New Jersey and supreme court commissioner of New Jersey, and served as the assistant prosecutor of the pleas of Union County, New Jersey from 1918-1923.

McLean was elected as a Republican to the Seventy-third and to the five succeeding Congresses, serving in office from March 4, 1933 – January 3, 1945. He was not a candidate for reelection in 1944 to the Seventy-ninth Congress.

After leaving Congress, he served as prosecutor of the pleas of Union County from June 24, 1945, to April 18, 1946, when he was appointed judge of the New Jersey Court of Errors and Appeals, the state's highest court under the 1844 Constitution of New Jersey. He became judge of New Jersey Superior Court under reorganization of New Jersey judiciary in September 1948 resulting from implementation of the 1947 Constitution. He was reappointed in April 1952 and retired on his 70th birthday on March 18, 1954, under age requirement and returned to practicing law, retiring in 1968.

McLean resided in Elizabeth, New Jersey. He died in Burlington, Vermont on August 19, 1975. His remains were cremated, and his ashes interred in Vail Memorial Cemetery, Parsippany, New Jersey.

U.S. House of Representatives
Preceded by Randolph Perkins	Member of the U.S. House of Representatives from New Jersey's 6th congressional district March 4, 1933-January 3, 1945	Succeeded by Clifford P. Case
