= Dudley-Anderson-Yutzy =

- Industry: public relations
- Founded: 1909 (as Pendleton Dudley and Associates)
- Defunct: 1983 (as independent company), 1988 (as division of Ogilvy & Mather)
- Fate: Purchased by Ogilvy & Mather
- Headquarters: New York, New York, USA

Dudley-Anderson-Yutzy (D-A-Y) was a public relations firm established by Pendleton Dudley, purportedly at the suggestion of Ivy Lee.

== History ==
Founded in New York City in 1909 and originally named Pendleton Dudley and Associates, Dudley's company's masthead was changed to Dudley-Anderson-Yutzy in 1946 after Thomas D. Yutzy and George Anderson joined as partners.

During the late 1960s Dudley, Anderson and Yutzy died, creating a leadership vacuum at the firm. In 1970, in the wake of declining business fortunes, sisters Barbara Hunter and Jean Schoonover bought the company. The two had been employed at the firm since shortly after World War II. During Hunter and Schoonover's first month of ownership, they discovered that male account executives at D-A-Y were being paid at the rate of $25,000 per year, while females had a base salary of $18,000.

In 1983 Hunter and Schoonover sold D-A-Y to Ogilvy & Mather. At the time of the firm's acquisition it was considered the world's oldest continually operating public relations firm. Ogilvy & Mather continued to operate D-A-Y as a separate division until 1988.

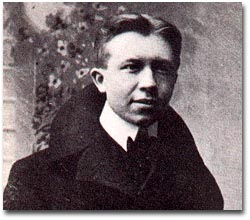
Explorer Vilhjalmur Stefansson was retained by Pendleton Dudley as a celebrity spokesperson to promote meat consumption.

== Clients and notable campaigns ==
D-A-Y was considered a pioneering company in public relations. Among its notable successes was helping to increase the annual consumption of bananas in the U.S. from 17.4 pounds to more than 22 pounds over a ten-year period by highlighting the health benefits of the fruit. It was also credited with the popularization of orange juice in the 1930s as part of a campaign for the Florida Citrus Commission, an effort for which the firm hired Woman's Home Companion writer Marie Teitgen as the D-A-Y "Director of Home Economics." In 1927, to help promote increased meat consumption, the firm - at the behest of its client the American Meat Institute - financed a two-year all meat and water diet for Vilhjalmur Stefansson. In 1975 it was tasked with organizing commemorations for the two hundredth anniversary of the capture of Fort Ticonderoga. The celebration of the Brooklyn Bridge centennial - which the firm was retained to organize - was called "the public relations triumph of 1983" by Inc.

As with many PR agencies of the era, however, D-A-Y's work was not without controversy. Three weeks before the Triangle Shirtwaist Factory fire of 1911, Dudley - on behalf of the Protective League of Property Owners - helped organize opposition to the mandatory installation of sprinklers in warehouses. Later, after World War II, it was revealed Dudley had worked as a middleman to funnel payments made by the Reader's Digest to Lawrence Dennis, an American writer prosecuted by the U.S. government as a pro-Nazi agitator.

AT&T, which retained D-A-Y in 1909, continued as a client until Dudley's death in 1966. Other clients included Verbatim, Kool-aid and Borden. Tabasco sauce was represented by D-A-Y from the 1920s until it was purchased by Ogilvy in 1983.
