= Pendleton Dudley =

American journalist (1876–1966)

- Pendleton Dudley pictured in 1947
- Born: September 8, 1876; Troy, Missouri
- Died: December 10, 1966 (aged 90)
- Citizenship: American
- Education: Columbia University (BA)
- Occupation: public relations
- Spouse: Hermine Jahns (m. 1910)
- Children: Jane and Margaret
- Awards: Gold Anvil Award (1955)

Pendleton Dudley (September 8, 1876 – December 10, 1966) was an American journalist and public relations executive. Once considered the "dean of public relations", he is best known as the long-time outside publicity counsel to AT&T and as a founder of the predecessor organizations to the Public Relations Society of America and the Institute for Public Relations. He was the father of the choreographer Jane Dudley and composer Margaret Purcell, and was the husband of the motorist Hermine Jahns.

== Early life and education ==
Dudley was born in Troy, Missouri, to Peter Dudley and Cornelia Dudley (née Pendleton). The Dudleys had come to Missouri from Kentucky by wagon a few years before the younger Dudley's birth. Peter Dudley operated a general store in Troy. Pendleton Dudley attended Mexico High School in Mexico, Missouri, for two years before he had to drop-out to assist with the family store due to his father's ill health.

Dudley began working as a part-time reporter and typesetter for the weekly Troy Free Press while still employed at the family store. This eventually led to a job at The Mexico Ledger. In 1898, inspired by an article he had read in the Saturday Evening Post titled "Working Your Way Through College", Dudley began putting-away a portion of his earnings to attend university. In 1899, having saved $100, he moved to New York City and enrolled at Columbia University, graduating in 1906. During his time at Columbia he contributed to the campus humor magazine Jester of Columbia.

== Career ==
After graduating from Columbia Dudley held a variety of odd jobs, including as a retail clerk, a bond salesman, and an occasional stringer for the New York Times. He was eventually hired as a reporter for the Wall Street Journal on the recommendation of his friend Ivy Lee. During his time covering financial news for the Wall Street Journal, Dudley observed that many of the city's most prominent businessmen were essentially "inept" at dealing with the media. In 1909 he left the Wall Street Journal and opened a publicity firm at 34 Pine Street in Manhattan, Pendleton Dudley and Associates. Historically, the firm has been considered the fifth public relations agency established in the United States.

One of Dudley's first large accounts was AT&T, a client he would keep until his death in 1966. Dudley was also retained to mount a campaign to launch the political career of Woodrow Wilson, then president of Princeton University. Dudley's client in this endeavor is unknown and he would carry the details of the assignment to his grave. He last spoke about the Wilson project in 1959 to say only that it was a "highly confidential matter", exposure of which would be "damaging to our profession". Prior to the Triangle Shirtwaist Factory fire of 1911, Dudley helped organize opposition to the mandatory installation of sprinklers in warehouses at the behest of another client, the Protective League of Property Owners. Following World War II, it was revealed Dudley had worked as a middle-man to funnel payments from DeWitt Wallace to Lawrence Dennis; Wallace had hired Dennis to write "smear pieces" against Henry A. Wallace for Reader's Digest.

In the 1940s, Dudley brought two former newspaper editors on to his firm as partners, changing the company's name to Dudley-Anderson-Yutzy.

Dudley was heavily involved with the Public Relations Society of America, founding one of its predecessor groups and serving as the first chairman of the Foundations for Public Relations Research and Education, forerunner to the Institute for Public Relations.

== Personal life ==
In 1910, Dudley married Hermine Jahns. The following year his wife gave birth to their first child, Jane Dudley. At the time, Dudley wrote that the birth of Jane "incidentally solved our problem as to whether or not we should send our boy to Columbia ... neither of us believes in college for girls." With his wife he had a second daughter, Margaret.

In 1915 Dudley returned to Mexico, Missouri, where he was feted as one of two guests of honor, along with Jouett Shouse, at the Mexico High School alumni banquet. For a five-year period after they founded Reader's Digest, DeWitt Wallace and Lila Bell Wallace rented and lived in a cottage on Dudley's Pleasantville, New York property, having responded to a newspaper ad Dudley had taken out.

In retirement, Dudley lived at his home in Pleasantville and maintained ownership of his firm. In 1965, a year before his death, he moved to the University Club of New York. His memorial service was held at Columbia University's St. Paul's Chapel; Alfred A. Knopf Sr. delivered the eulogy.

He had three siblings.

== Legacy ==
At the time of his 1966 death, Dudley was known as the "dean of public relations". In a 1970 survey of public relations practitioners undertaken by the University of Michigan, he was voted third in a poll of the "most outstanding public relations figures" of the 20th century (Ivy Lee was voted first).

In 1957 Dudley endowed the Pendleton Dudley Scholarship at Macalester College in response to a scholarship fundraising drive undertaken by Dewitt Wallace. It is annually awarded to "an unusually talented young man who aspires to be a teacher."
