= John R. Ramsey =

American politician (1862-1933)

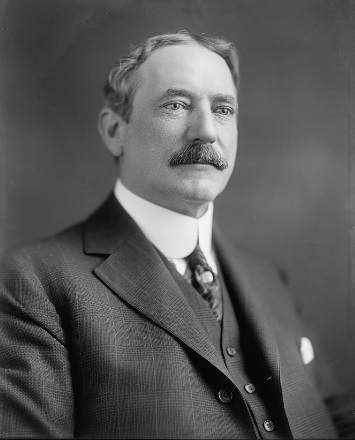
- Harris & Ewing photo, circa 1917.

Member of the U.S. House of Representatives from New Jersey's 6th district
- In office March 4, 1917 – March 3, 1921
- Preceded by: Archibald C. Hart
- Succeeded by: Randolph Perkins

Bergen County Clerk
- In office 1895–1910

Personal details
- Born: April 25, 1862 Wyckoff, New Jersey, U.S.
- Died: April 10, 1933 (aged 70) Hackensack, New Jersey, U.S.
- Resting place: Hackensack Cemetery
- Party: Republican
- Spouse: Alice Huyler (m. 1906)

John Rathbone Ramsey (April 25, 1862 – April 10, 1933) was an American Republican Party politician who represented New Jersey's 6th congressional district in the United States House of Representatives from 1917 to 1921.

Ramsey was born in Wyckoff, New Jersey on April 25, 1862. He attended the public schools and a private school in Parkersburg, West Virginia, where he lived from 1872 to 1879. He studied law in Hackensack, New Jersey, and was admitted to the bar in 1883 and commenced practice in Hackensack. He was county clerk of Bergen County from 1895 to 1910 and was a delegate to the 1908 Republican National Convention. He was president of the Hackensack Brick Co. from 1909 to 1933 and was director of several banks. His wife was automotive pioneer Alice Huyler Ramsey.

Rathbone was elected as a Republican to the Sixty-fifth and Sixty-sixth Congresses, serving in office from March 4, 1917 to March 3, 1921, but was an unsuccessful candidate for renomination in 1920.

After leaving Congress, he resumed the manufacture of brick. Rathbone died in Hackensack on April 10, 1933, and was buried there in Hackensack Cemetery.

U.S. House of Representatives
Preceded by Archibald C. Hart	Member of the U.S. House of Representatives from New Jersey's 6th congressional district March 4, 1917-March 3, 1921	Succeeded by Randolph Perkins
