= Alice Huyler Ramsey =

Vehicular pioneer (1886–1983)

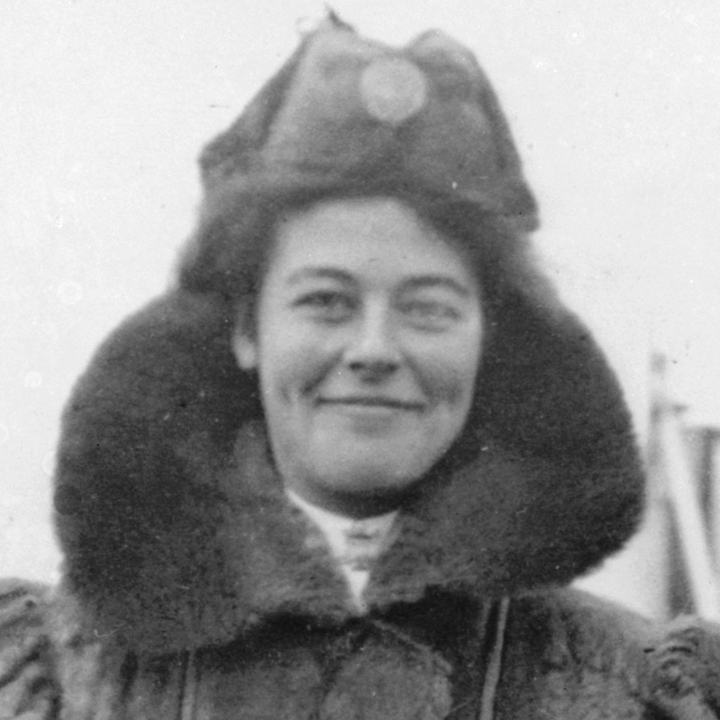
- Born: November 11, 1886; New Barbadoes Township, New Jersey, U.S.
- Died: September 10, 1983 (aged 96); Covina, California, U.S.
- Occupation: Vehicular pioneer
- Spouse: John R. Ramsey (m. 1906; died 1933)
- Children: John R., Jr. and Alice
- Parent(s): Ada and John Huyler

Alice Huyler Ramsey (November 11, 1886 – September 10, 1983) was an American who was the first woman to drive an automobile across the United States from coast to coast, a feat she completed on August 7, 1909.

== Early life ==
Ramsey was born Alice Taylor Huyler, the daughter of John Edwin Huyler, a lumber dealer, and Ada Mumford Farr. She attended Vassar College from 1903 to 1905. On January 10, 1906, in Hackensack, New Jersey, Ramsey married congressman John R. Ramsey (1862–1933), with whom she had two children: John Rathbone Ramsey, Jr. (1907–2000), and Alice Valleau Ramsey (1910–2015), who married Robert Stewart Bruns (1906–1981).

== Career ==
In 1908 her husband bought her a new Maxwell runabout. That summer she drove over 6,000 miles near their Hackensack home. In September 1908 she drove one of the three Maxwells which were entered in that year's American Automobile Association's (AAA) Montauk Point endurance race, being one of only two women to participate. She won a bronze medal by getting a perfect score in the race. One of the other Maxwell drivers was Carl Kelsey, who did publicity for Maxwell-Briscoe. It was during this event that Kelsey proposed that she attempt a transcontinental journey, with Maxwell-Briscoe's backing. The company would supply a 1909 touring car for the journey and would also provide assistance and parts as needed. The drive was originally meant as a publicity stunt for Maxwell-Briscoe and would also prove to be part of Maxwell's ongoing strategy of specifically marketing to women. At that time, women were not often encouraged to drive cars.

=== Transcontinental drive ===
On June 9, 1909, the 22-year-old housewife and mother began a 3,800-mile (6,100 km) journey from New York City to San Francisco in a green, four-cylinder, 30-horsepower Maxwell DA. On her 59-day trek she was accompanied by two older sisters-in-law and 19-year-old friend Hermine Jahns, none of whom could drive a car. They arrived amid great fanfare on August 7, although about three weeks later than originally planned.

The group of women used maps from the American Automobile Association to make the journey. Only 152 of the 3,600 miles (244 of the 5,767 kilometers) that the group traveled were paved. Over the course of the drive, Ramsey changed 11 tires, cleaned the spark plugs, repaired a broken brake pedal, and had to sleep in the car when it was stuck in mud. The women mostly navigated by following the telephone poles with more wires in hopes that they would lead to a town.

Along the way, they crossed the trail of a manhunt for a killer in Nebraska, Ramsey received a case of bedbugs from a Wyoming hotel, and in Nevada they were surrounded by a Native American hunting party with bows and arrows drawn. In San Francisco, crowds awaited them at the St. James Hotel. Ramsey was named the "Woman Motorist of the Century" by AAA in 1960. In later years, she lived in West Covina, California, where in 1961 she wrote and published the story of her journey, Veil, Duster, and Tire Iron. Between 1909 and 1975, Ramsey drove across the country more than 30 times.

After her husband's death in 1933, Ramsey lived with Anna Graham Harris in New Jersey and then later in West Covina, California, until Anna's death in 1953, and eventually with Elizabeth Elliott in Covina, California, from 1968 until Ramsey's death on September 10, 1983.

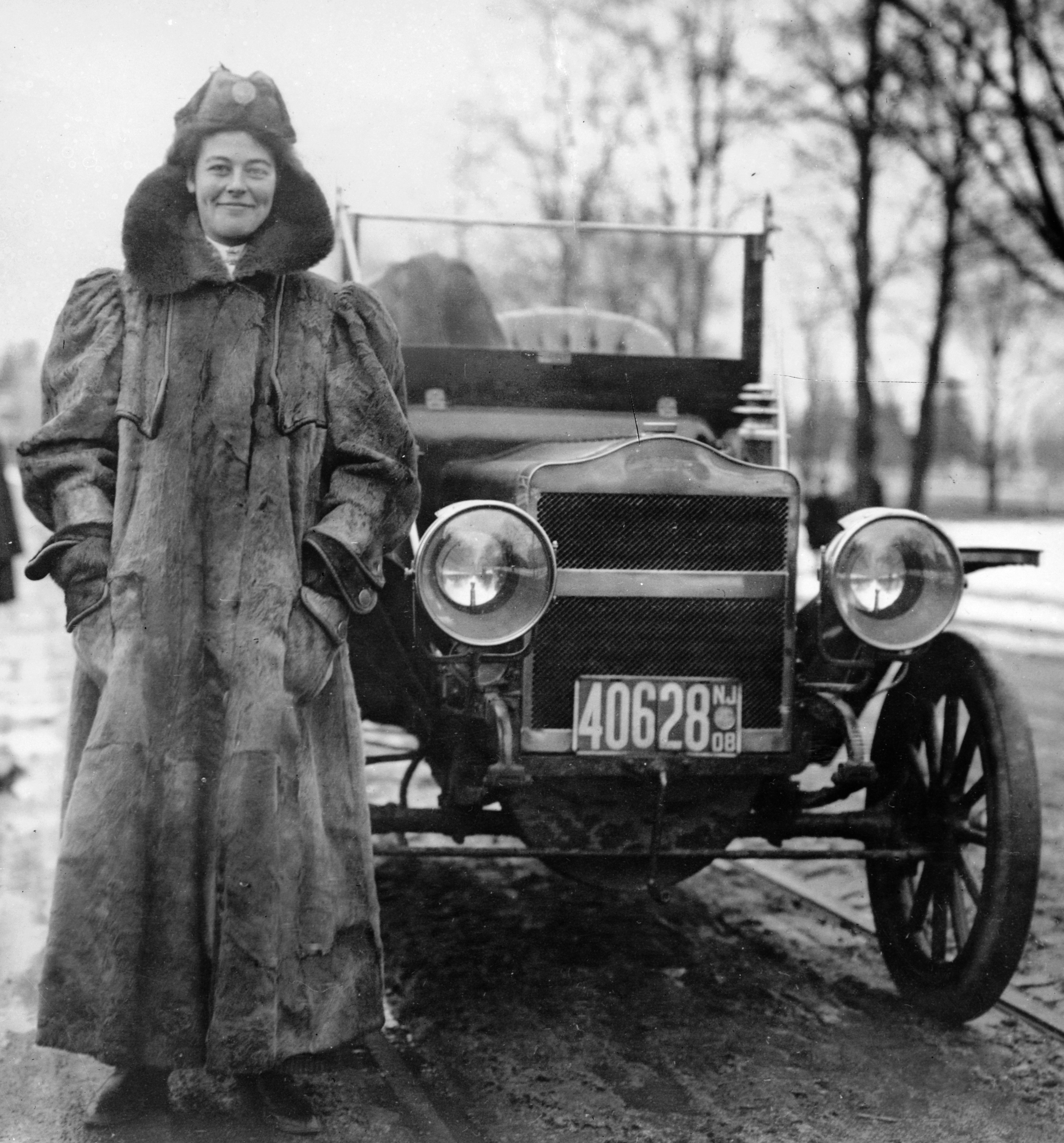
Alice Huyler Ramsey, standing beside her automobile, c. 1908

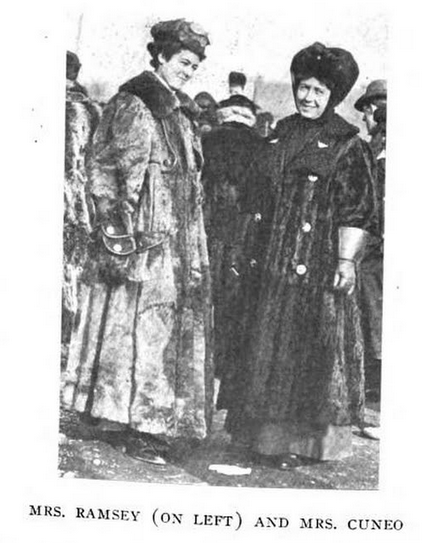
Alice Huyler Ramsey and fellow driver Joan Newton Cuneo, from a 1909 publication

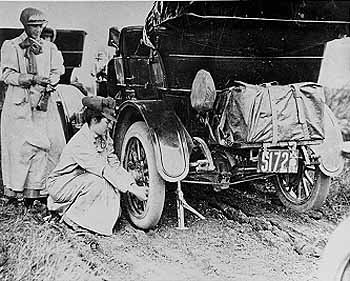
Alice Huyler Ramsey (1887–1983) in 1909, changing a tire on her green Maxwell

== Legacy ==
On October 17, 2000, Ramsey became the first woman inducted into the Automotive Hall of Fame.

== Books ==
- Ramsey, Alice Huyler (1961). Veil, Duster, and Tire Iron. Covina, Calif.: Grant Edward Dahlstrom; Castle Press. OCLC 7937235.
- Ramsey, Alice Huyler (2005). Alice's Drive: Republishing Veil, Duster, and Tire Iron. Tucson, AZ: Patrice Press. ISBN 9781880397565. OCLC 58043308.

== See also ==
- Vermont (automobile) – first automobile to cross the United States
