= Stanley Bosworth =

Educator

Stanley Anselm Bosworth (August 20, 1927 – August 7, 2011) was the founding headmaster of Saint Ann's School in Brooklyn, which he headed from 1965 to 2004.

Stanley Bosworth was born in New York City and raised in Washington Heights, the child of Murray and Bertha Bosworth. Murray had immigrated from Russia. Stanley Bosworth was drafted into the American Army during the Second World War, in which he was a codebreaker stationed in Germany. Afterwards, he lived in Paris, studying poetry and philosophy at the Sorbonne, and would later go on to earn an advanced degree in philosophy at New York University, where he taught for some time.

Bosworth would go on to teach French at the now-defunct Walden School on the Upper West Side. In 1965, he was selected as the first headmaster at Saint Ann's School, where he was known for his eccentric, aphoristic leadership.

== Death ==
Bosworth died at his home in Carroll Gardens, Brooklyn of complications of dementia on August 7, 2011, at the age of 83.
