= Lewis J. Martin =

American politician

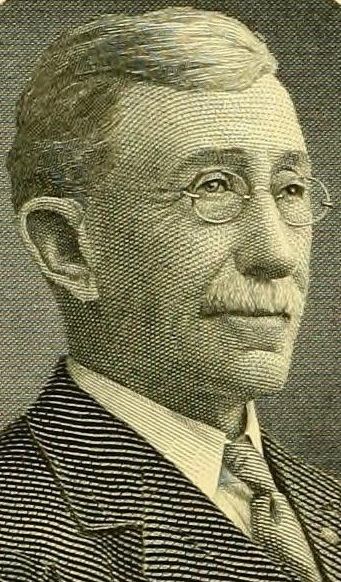

Member of the U.S. House of Representatives from New Jersey's 6th district
- In office March 4, 1913 – May 5, 1913
- Preceded by: Archibald C. Hart
- Succeeded by: Archibald C. Hart

County Judge of Sussex County, New Jersey
- In office 1911 – May 5, 1913
- Appointed by: Woodrow Wilson

Member of the New Jersey Senate from Sussex County
- In office 1898–1903
- Preceded by: Jacob Gould
- Succeeded by: Jacob Cole Price

Member of the New Jersey General Assembly from Sussex County
- In office 1879–1881
- Preceded by: George Greer
- Succeeded by: William E. Ross

Sussex County Clerk
- In office 1869

Personal details
- Born: February 22, 1844 Deckertown, New Jersey
- Died: May 5, 1913 (aged 69) Washington, D.C.
- Resting place: Newton Cemetery, Newton, New Jersey, US
- Party: Democratic

Lewis J. Martin (February 22, 1844 – May 5, 1913) was an American lawyer and Democratic Party politician who briefly represented New Jersey's 6th congressional district in the United States House of Representatives in 1913.

== Early life and career ==
Martin was born near Deckertown (now Sussex, New Jersey) on February 22, 1844. He attended the common schools. He studied law, was admitted to the bar in 1867 and commenced practice in Branchville, New Jersey.

He was chief clerk in the office of the county clerk of Sussex County in 1868 and 1869, and was county clerk of Sussex County in 1869. Martin was a member of the New Jersey General Assembly from 1879 to 1881. He was a judge of the Sussex County Court from 1881 to 1896. Martin served as attorney to the Board of Chosen Freeholders of Sussex County from 1896 to 1911, when he was appointed county judge by Governor of New Jersey Woodrow Wilson and served until his death. He was a member of the town committee from 1896 to 1907, and was a member of the New Jersey Senate from 1898 to 1903.

== U.S. House of Representatives ==
He was elected as a Democrat to the Sixty-third Congress and served from March 4, 1913, until his death in Washington, D.C. on May 5, 1913. He was interred in Newton Cemetery in Newton, New Jersey.

== See also ==
- List of members of the United States Congress who died in office (1900–1949)

U.S. House of Representatives
Preceded by Archibald C. Hart	Member of the U.S. House of Representatives from New Jersey's 6th congressional district March 4, 1913-May 5, 1913	Succeeded by Archibald C. Hart
