= Archibald C. Hart =

American politician

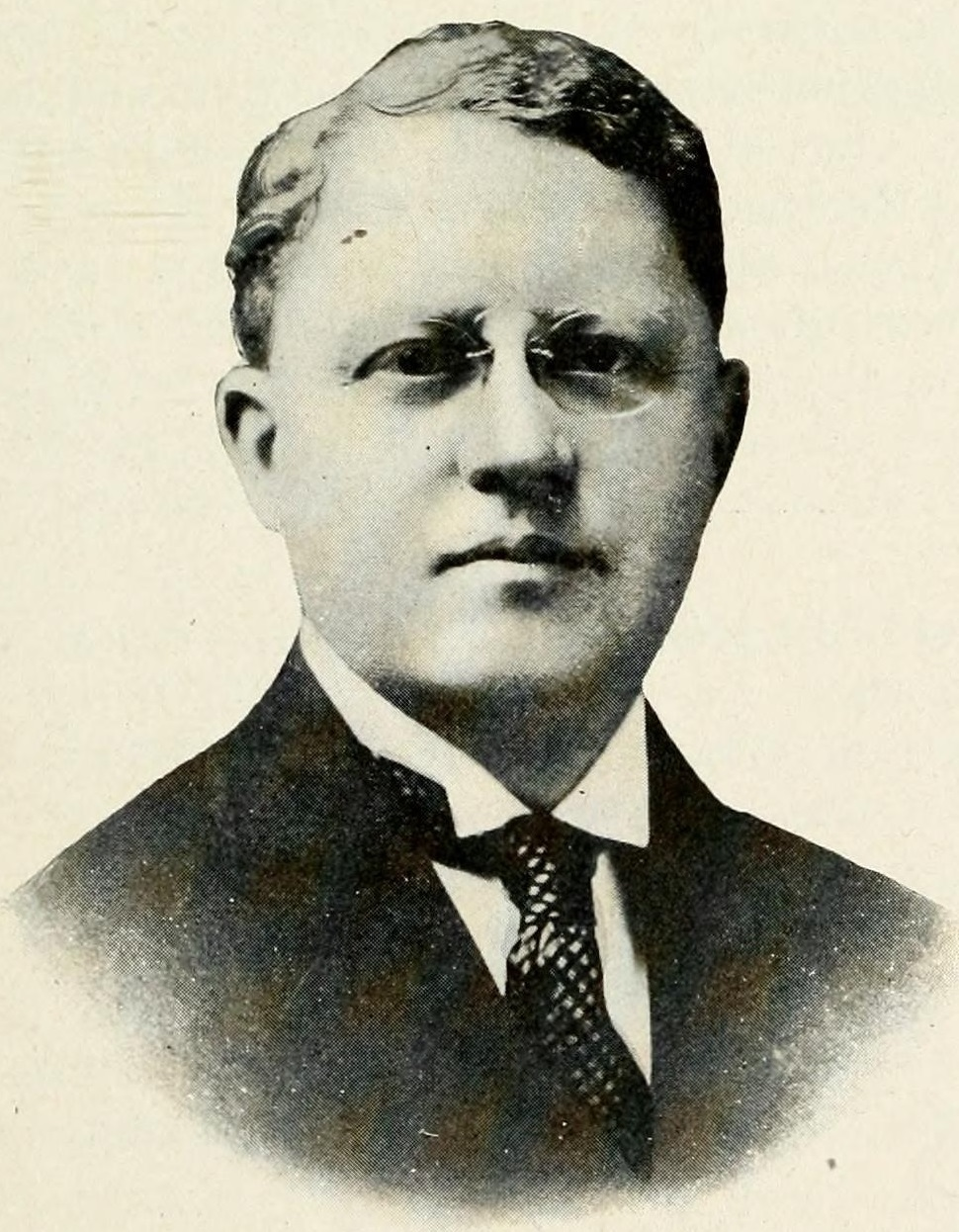
- From Volume I of 1917's Scannell's New Jersey First Citizens.

Prosecutor of Bergen County
- In office 1920–1930

Member of the U.S. House of Representatives from New Jersey's 6th district
- In office July 22, 1913 – March 3, 1917
- Preceded by: Lewis J. Martin
- Succeeded by: John R. Ramsey
- In office November 5, 1912 – March 3, 1913
- Preceded by: William Hughes
- Succeeded by: Lewis J. Martin

Personal details
- Born: February 27, 1873 Lennoxville, Quebec, Canada
- Died: July 24, 1935 (aged 62) Teaneck, New Jersey, U.S.
- Resting place: Hackensack Cemetery
- Party: Democratic

Archibald Chapman Hart (February 27, 1873 in Lennoxville, Quebec – July 24, 1935 in Teaneck, New Jersey) was an American lawyer, military veteran, and Democratic Party politician who represented New Jersey's 6th congressional district in the United States House of Representatives from 1912 to 1913 and again from 1913 to 1917.

== Early life and education ==
Hart was born in Lennoxville, Quebec on February 27, 1873. He moved with his parents to New York City in 1882 and to Hackensack, New Jersey, in 1884. He attended the common schools and studied law. He was admitted to the New Jersey bar in 1896 and commenced practice in Hackensack.

=== Spanish American War ===
Hart served in the Second Regiment, New Jersey Volunteer Infantry, during the Spanish–American War and served four years in the Twenty-third Regiment of the New York Army National Guard. By profession, he was a banker, publisher, and real estate operator.

He was also selected as a delegate to the 1908 Democratic National Convention.

== Congress ==
Hart was elected as a Democrat to the Sixty-second Congress to fill the vacancy caused by the resignation of William Hughes and served in office from November 5, 1912, to March 3, 1913, but was an unsuccessful candidate for the Democratic nomination in 1912 to the Sixty-third Congress.

He was later elected to this Congress to fill the vacancy caused by the death of Lewis J. Martin and reelected to the Sixty-fourth Congress, where he served in office from July 22, 1913, to March 3, 1917. He declined to be a candidate for renomination in 1916.

== Later career and death ==
He resumed the practice of law and his former business pursuits in Hackensack and resided in Teaneck, New Jersey. He was the prosecuting attorney for Bergen County from 1920 to 1930.

He died in Teaneck on July 24, 1935, and was interred in Hackensack Cemetery in Hackensack.

== Electoral history ==
=== United States House of Representatives ===
United States House of Representatives elections, 1930
Party	Candidate	Votes	%	±%
Republican	Randolph Perkins (incumbent)	72,868	56.46	▼8.66
Democratic	Archibald C. Hart	55,283	42.83	
Socialist	Henry J. Cox	774	0.60	▲0.40
Communist	Charles Dzevetzko	146	0.11	
Total votes		129,071	100.0	
Republican hold				

U.S. House of Representatives
Preceded by William Hughes	Member of the U.S. House of Representatives from New Jersey's 6th congressional district November 5, 1912 – March 3, 1913	Succeeded by Lewis J. Martin
Preceded by Lewis J. Martin	Member of the U.S. House of Representatives from New Jersey's 6th congressional district July 22, 1913–March 3, 1917	Succeeded by John R. Ramsey
