= Margaret Purcell =

American composer (1914–1991)

- Born: August 18, 1914; New York, New York
- Died: Fall 1991 (aged 76–77); Charleston, South Carolina
- Occupation: Composer
- Parents: Pendleton Dudley (father); Hermine Dudley (mother)
- Relatives: Jane Dudley (sister)

Margaret Purcell (18 August 1914 – Fall 1991) née Dudley, was an American composer. Purcell's father was the journalist Pendleton Dudley and her mother the motorist Hermine Dudley. Purcell's sister was the dancer, choreographer, and teacher Jane Dudley.

== Education ==
Margaret Purcell studied piano with pianist and composer Katherine Heyman between 1927 and 1928, who was a proponent of the music of Alexander Scriabin. She also later studied composition with the English composer Richard Arnell, who also taught at Trinity College of Music. Letters exist between Arnell and Purcell from the 1950s, in which he offers her advice on aspects of music.

== Personal life ==
Her father Pendleton Dudley was a journalist and worked in public relations, and her mother Hermine Dudley was the first women motorist to drive across the United States. Hermine took her daughter Margaret on a trip abroad in 1938, taking several weeks to explore the fjords and roads of Norway and Sweden. Margaret's later marriage to Richard Purcell was short, due to an accident. During her lifetime she lived in New York, Martha's Vineyard, Massachusetts, and Charleston, South Carolina, where she died.

== Career ==
The archive of Purcell's unpublished works resides in London at the Trinity Laban Conservatoire of Music and Dance. Her compositional output ranges from solo piano and songs, to chamber and orchestral works.

Purcell's orchestral work Chalumeau was premiered at the Town Hall in New York City, 113 West 43rd Street, on 25 January 1947, with Harold Kohon conducting the American Chamber Music Ensemble. This concert also included works by Vincent d'Indy and Richard Arnell. Another concert featuring Purcell's music including her Nine Piano Pieces dedicated to Arnell, Two Songs (Monastery Evening and The Call), and an Impromptu for Piano, occurred in London 7 March 2001 performed by Julia Richter. This event also featured choreography by her sister Jane Dudley, and took place at Studios 1 and 2, The Place.

Purcell's setting of text demonstrates a wide interest in authors including Rabindranath Tagore, Langston Hughes, Walter De La Mare, Otomo no Yakamochi and the Hindu mystic Lalla.

== Selected works ==
Orchestral
Overture: Bergen Harbour	Full orchestra	1944. "To Jule Eisenbud"
Chalumeau	String Orchestra	1945
Chamber
Clarinet Quartet	Clarinet and strings	1st movement missing. 2nd & 3rd movements complete.
Pied Piper	Flute, Clarinet and Bassoon	
Vocal
All my Love	Contralto and Piano	1961 (Anonymous Scottish poem)
Autumn	Contralto and Piano	1957 (Oe no Chisato)
Beloved I	Contralto and Piano	1961 (Poem from Selections of Vivekananda)
Beloved II	Contralto and Piano	1961
Cancionero I	Contralto and Piano	1960 (Poem from the Spanish middle-ages)
Cancionero II	Contralto and Piano	1960
Cancionero V	Contralto and Piano	1961
Carol I	Contralto and Piano	1961
Carol II	Contralto and Piano	1961
Carol III "Northern Wind"	Contralto and Piano	1961
Come Back. Cancionero VI	Contralto and Piano	1961 (Poem by Rabindranath Tagore)
Days and Moments	Contralto and Piano	1960 (Walter de la Mare)
Dive Deep	Contralto and Piano	1961 (Poem from Gospel of Ramakrishna)
Four Songs for Contralto: I Wait My Lord; No Regret; Lament; Song for Little Snook	Contralto and Piano	1956 – 1957: Chinese poem, 500BC.; Langston Hughes.; 13th Arabian poem.; Song missing.
Greek Lullaby	Contralto and Piano	1959
Hymn	Contralto and Piano	1960 (Gospel of Ramakrishna)
Love	Contralto and Piano	1960 (Anonymous English poem, 1605)
Love II	Contralto and Piano	1961
Love Song	Contralto and Piano	1960 (18th century poem)
Lullaby for Bunny-love I	Contralto and Piano	1955
Lullaby for Bunny-love II	Contralto and Piano	1959 (Shakespeare)
Lullaby I	Contralto and Piano	1961
Lullaby II	Contralto and Piano	1961
Lullaby III	Contralto and Piano	1961
Mist	Contralto and Piano	1957 (Otomo no Yakamochi)
Mozarabic	Voice and Piano	
Not I but thou	Contralto and Piano	
Poem I	Contralto and Piano	1961 (Poem by Rabindranath Tagore)
Poem II	Contralto and Piano	1959 (Hindu mystic, Lalla)
Psalm 55	Contralto and Piano	1960
Self of my self	Contralto and Piano	1960 (Hindu mystic, Lalla)
Sky	Contralto and Piano	1960 (Fujiwara no Tadahira)
Song	Contralto and Piano	1960 (Anonymous 15th century poem)
Song & Poem I	Contralto and Piano	1960
Song & Poem I	Contralto and Piano	1960
Song and Poem I	Contralto and Piano	1961
Song, Variation on B	Contralto and Piano	1961
South Shore	Voice and piano	
Stary Sky	Contralto and Piano	1960 (9th century Irish poem)
The Gentle Now	Contralto and Piano	1964
The Reed of Pan	Contralto and Piano	1959 (12th century poem)
The Risen Sun	Contralto and Piano	1960 (Walter de la Mare)
Three Songs for Tenor: I travelled with them; Poem; The Plum Tree	Tenor and Piano	1957: Al-Mu'yamid ibn Abbad.; Saigyo Hoshi.; Fujiwara no letaka.
Tomorrow shall be my dancing day	Contralto and Piano	1959 (Anonymous 15th century Enslish poem)
True Love	Contralto and Piano	1959 (Anonymous 13th Century English poem)
Turtle Dove	Contralto and Piano	1959 (Ancient Spanish Ballad)
Two Songs for Tenor: Plaineth; Twilight	Tenor and Piano	1951: Anonymous.; William Sydney Walker.
Two Songs: Monastery Evening; The Call		1949 "Dedicated to Richard Murdock"
Western Wind	Contralto and Piano	1958 (Anonymous 15th century English poem)
Why Tarry	Voice and Piano	1961
Winter Evening	Contralto and Piano	1960 (Walter de la Mare)
Solo Instrument
Fantasy I "Bells"	Piano	1958
Fantasy II	Piano	
Fantasy III	Piano	1964
Fantasy IV	Piano	1964
Fantasy V	Piano	1963
Impromptu	Piano	1948
Nine Piano Preludes	Piano	"Dedicated to Richard Arnell"
Prelude I	Piano	1958
Prelude II	Piano	
Prelude III	Piano	1958
Rondeaux	Piano	
Song	Accordion	
Song	Piano	1964 "To Dad, with all my love from Margie"
Toccata I	Piano	1958
Toccata II	Piano	1958
