= Ethel Webling =

English painter and illustrator ( 1859 - 1929)

Ethel Webling (26 October 1859 – 1929) was an English artist, specialising in portrait miniatures and illustration.

== Early life and family ==
Ethel Webling was born in St Pancras, London and was the daughter of Robert James Webling, a silversmith and jeweler, and his wife Maria. She had four sisters named Lucy, Josephine, Rosalind, and Ruth, who were all dramatic actors, and another named Peggy who was an author and playwright. Ethel, the eldest of the siblings, took up art, studying at the Slade School of Art.

== Career ==
From 1881 to 1894, she exhibited eleven times at the Royal Academy of Arts, most notably with a miniature of John Ruskin in 1888 and a pastel of Sir Herbert Beerbohm Tree as Hamlet in 1892. In the 1880s she, along with other female artists, was commissioned by Ruskin to make copies of Old Master works for the Guild of St. George in Sheffield. She also secured the patronage of Christiana Herringham, and an 1887 pastel portrait of Herringham's two sons was donated to Royal Holloway, along with much of Herringham's collections. In 1894 Ethel also contributed a set of six miniature portraits ito an exhibition of women's portraits at the National Academy of Design in New York.

She was connected to the world of Shakespearean theatre through her sisters' work. In 1884 she created ninety sketches of Henry Irving's production of Twelfth Night at the Lyceum Theatre in a copy of the play, which was acquired by the Folger Shakespeare Library in 2003. In 1898, she created a hand-illustrated book documenting Herbert Beerbohm Tree's production of Shakespeare's Julius Caesar at Her Majesty's Theatre. In 2017, Shakespeare Birthplace Trust research determined that this collection item was a unique record of the production rather than an imagined staging.

Ethel supported the movement for women's suffrage, signing the Declaration in Favour of Women's Suffrage: Being the Signatures Received at the Office of the Central Committee for Women's Suffrage, Etc. in 1889.

== Later years and death ==
In 1917, she was called to testify in the trial of psychic Almira Brockway, whom Webling consulted on the whereabouts of her soldier nephew, who was missing in action. She died in 1929.
