= Archipelago Films =

New York film and television production company

Archipelago Films, Inc.
- Industry: Film and Television
- Founded: 1991
- Founder: Andrew Young; Susan Todd
- Products: Motion pictures, television documentaries
- Website: archipelagofilms.com

Archipelago Films is a New York based film and television production company. It was founded in 1991 by Academy Award-nominated and Emmy Award-winning filmmakers Andrew Young and Susan Todd. Together, they have produced, directed, and provided cinematography for dozens of documentaries on social and environmental topics. In addition to their documentary work, Young and Todd have a filmography that include 3D Giant Screen/IMAX® films, short narrative films, museum exhibit pieces, and films for nonprofit NGOs and corporations.

In addition to traditional documentary techniques, which include interviews and cinema verité-style shooting, they also use a variety of digital cinematography techniques such as utilizing miniature cameras, probe lenses, aerial mounts, underwater housings, and remote control cameras to visualize the perspectives of their subjects.

== History ==
The name of the company is associated with its first film, The Spirit of Kuna Yala, made in 1991. The film features the Kuna Indians of Panama's San Blas archipelago as they "unite to protect their rainforest homeland, Kuna Yala, and the tradition it inspires." The film is told entirely in the words of the Kunas.

The company's second film, Children of Fate: Life and Death in a Sicilian Family, was nominated for an Academy Award for best documentary feature. The film follows up on the same Sicilian family documented in the 1961 film Cortile Cascino, which was directed by Andrew Young's father, Robert Young. In the updated portrait, Angela Capra is still fighting for her family, against "a vicious cycle of poverty, ignorance and crime" in a Palermo slum. Children of Fate won the Grand Jury Prize and the Cinematography Award at the Sundance Film Festival.

In 1996, Young and Todd produced, directed, and photographed Cutting Loose, a feature-length documentary about the New Orleans Mardi Gras, for French and German television. Variety described the film as "impressive on a technical level, and engrossing..." It also won the Filmmaker Trophy for Documentary at the Sundance Film Festival.

Archipelago Films has also collaborated with Edward James Olmos and his company Olmos Productions for several feature documentaries. One of these films, commissioned by the United States Justice Department, It Ain't Love, is a story of teenage dating violence, following members of a young improv company as they re-enact their abusive relationships. Subsequently, they directed the HBO documentary: Americanos: Latino Life in the United States which featured notable Hispanic icons, including Carlos Santana and Tito Puente. Their depiction of the lives of teenage gang members in Eastern Los Angeles, Lives in Hazard, was introduced by president Bill Clinton primetime on NBC.

In addition to contributing to various nature series and productions, Archipelago has produced a number of nature films. Archipelago's Madagascar: A World Apart was featured as part of the PBS series Living Edens. Archipelago Films has also had an ongoing collaboration with the Wildlife Conservation Society's Bronx Zoo, working on the media components of new exhibits, including the film at the Congo Gorilla Forest exhibit.

Archipelago Films has been filming wildlife in Eastern North America. Their footage of the breeding rituals of the North American wood duck was used in the PBS Nature show An Original DUCKumentary, which won the 2013 Emmy Award for Outstanding Nature Programming, and was nominated for Best Factual Series.

In 2018, Archipelago Films made their first 3D Giant Screen project, Backyard Wilderness, produced through Andrew Young and Susan Todd's 501(c)3 organization Arise Media, SK Films, and Tangled Bank Studios. Young and Todd directed the film together with Young as Director of Photography. The film follows a young girl who “gradually discovers the intricate secrets that nature has hidden so close to her front door,” captured with cameras “mounted inside dens and nests, and moving along the forest floor and pond bottom.” It earned accolades from the Giant Screen Cinema Association, the Beijing International Film Festival, The Jackson Hole Science Media Awards, and International Wildlife Film festival. The release of Backyard Wilderness was also accompanied by an impact campaign consisting of programming at more than 50 libraries and science centers, as well as an app titled “Seek.” Seek “encourages kid-friendly citizen science” and is the work of the iNaturalist group.

Recently, Archipelago Films has continued their work in IMAX cinema, with SK Films distributing Wings Over Water in 2022. Young was director, producer, and director of photography, and Todd was a producer. The film tells the story of the “triumphs and challenges” of three bird families: the Sandhill Crane, the Yellow Warbler and the Mallard Duck. The conservation narrative is heavily focused on prairie wetlands, where 200 species of migratory birds rely on its ecosystem. Called “one of the most epic bird films ever produced” by Forbes, the production was also supported by the National Audubon Society, the Max McGraw Wildlife Foundation, Delta Waterfowl, and Ducks Unlimited. It features narration from actor Micheal Keaton, as well as music from Huey Lewis, who have both expressed passions for conservation. Like Backyard Wilderness (2018), Wings Over Water (2022) also had educational materials released along with the film, and had exhibitions in museums and science centers across the United States, including the American Museum of Natural History and Denver Natural History Museum. From the Giant Screen Cinema Association

== Filmography and awards ==
Film and Television
Year	Film	Awards	Notes
1990	The Spirit of Kuna Yala (59 min.)	Golden Apple, National Educational Film & Video Festival; Red Ribbon, American Film and Video Festival; Earthwatch Film Award; Finalist, USA Film Festival	
1992	Children of Fate (85 min.)	Academy Award Nomination, Best Documentary; Grand Jury Prize, Sundance Film Festival; Cinematography Award, Sundance Film Festival; Grand Prix, Cinéma du Réel; Silver Centaur, Saint Petersburg International Film Festival; Golden Apple, National Educational Film & Video Festival; Best Documentary, Ft. Lauderdale Film Festival	Cinemax
1993	Lives in Hazard (57 min.)	Directors Guild of America Award Nomination; Golden Apple & Best of Classroom, Nat. Educational Film Festival	NBC
1996	Cutting Loose (90 min.)	Filmmaker Trophy, Sundance Film Festival; Cinematography Award, Sundance Film Festival; Golden Spire, San Francisco Film Festival	Smithsonian Channel
1997	It Ain't Love (58 min.)	Best of Festival, Windy City Documentary Festival; George Stoney Award, Cinema Arts Center; Golden Apple, National Educational Film & Video Festival	
1998	Madagascar: A World Apart (52 min.)	Emmy Award, Best Cinematography; Emmy Award Nomination, Best Directing; Best Cinematography, Jackson Hole Wildlife Film Festival	PBS Living Edens
1999	Saving Africa’s Forests (8 min.)	Best Non-Broadcast Film, International Wildlife Film Festival; Finalist, Jackson Hole Wildlife Film Festival	Permanent installation at Bronx Zoo
1999	Americanos (85 min.)	Best Cinematography, Sundance Film Festival; Best Documentary, Alma Awards	HBO
2001	Glacier Bay: Alaska’s wild coast (54 min.)	Emmy Award Nomination, Best Science/Nature Film; Emmy Award Nomination, Best Cinematography; Best Nature Program, Aurora Awards	PBS Living Edens
2003	Tiger Testimonials (6 min.)		Video installation at Bronx Zoo
2003	AIDS Warriors (48 min.)		PBS
2004	The Last Royals (54 min.)		National Geographic
2005	Deadly Messengers (54 min.)	Emmy Award, Outstanding Science Programming	PBS
2005	Wild Chronicles: Madagascar (20 min.)		National Geographic
2008	Small Wonders, Big Threats (12 min.)		Special venue feature at Bronx Zoo
2012	Unburden (20 min.)	Best Dramatic Film, Action/Cut Short Film Competition; Grand Jury Prize, Gasparilla International Film Festival; Lifetree Award, Lifetree Film Festival	Short film
2018	Backyard Wilderness (45 min.)	Audience Choice, Beijing International Film Festival Best Creativity Film Beijing International Film Festival Best Film Short Subject, Giant Screen Cinema Association Big Idea Award, Giant Screen Cinema Association Best Film For Lifelong Learning, Giant Screen Cinema Association Best Cinematography, Giant Screen Cinema Association Best Visual Effects, Giant Screen Cinema Association Science Media Award, Jackson Wild Media Awards Best Children's Film, Missoula International Wildlife Film Festival Gold Remi Award , WorldFest Houston	
2022	Wings Over Water (45 min.)	Best Film Short Subject, Giant Screen Cinema Association Best Film For Lifelong Learning, Giant Screen Cinema Association Best Visual Effects, Giant Screen Cinema Association Best Sound Design, Giant Screen Cinema Association Best Cinematography, Giant Screen Cinema Association Best Giant Screen Film, Beijing International Film Festival Best Scientific Communication Film, Beijing International Film Festival Best Children's Film Wildlife Film Festival Rotterdam	
