= William Kurelek =

Canadian artist and writer (1927–1977)

- Born: March 3, 1927 near Whitford, Alberta, Canada
- Died: November 3, 1977 (aged 50); Toronto, Ontario, Canada
- Education: University of Manitoba
- Occupation: Artist
- Years active: 1950s–1977
- Notable work: The Maze, Passion of Christ series
- Spouse: Jean Andrews (m. 1962)

William Kurelek, CM RCA (March 3, 1927 – November 3, 1977) was a Canadian artist and writer. His work was influenced by his childhood on the prairies, his Ukrainian-Canadian roots, his struggles with mental illness, and his conversion to Roman Catholicism.

== Early life ==
William Kurelek was born near Whitford, Alberta in 1927, the oldest of seven children in a Ukrainian immigrant family: Bill, John, Winn, Nancy, Sandy, Paul, and Iris. His father, Dmytro Kurelek, was born in Boriwtsi, Bukovina. Mary Huculak, his mother, was born in Canada, and received her elementary education in a local rural school. Her family had come with the first wave of Ukrainian immigration to Canada and was also from Boriwtsi. Dmytro and Mary were cousins. Dmytro arrived to work on the Huculak farm early in 1923. The couple married in the summer of 1925, his mother not quite nineteen at the time.

His family lost their grain farm during the Great Depression and moved to a six-hundred-acre former dairy farm near Stonewall, Manitoba, around 1933. A cousin let the family off from his wagon at the gate of their new farm in pitch darkness. The back of their farm bordered on the bog, today Oak Hammock Marsh. Some of his paintings in the books A prairie boy's summer and A prairie boy's winter depict Kurelek and other children in the setting of the bogland. Treelines along the horizon recorded by him in these paintings are still recognizable in the area.

"Victoria School could be seen from our milkhouse a mile away." It was the one-room schoolhouse that Kurelek and his brother, John, attended. When about to enter high school, their father announced that they would do so in Winnipeg, where he purchased a house on Burrows Ave., seeing this as the economically wiser course than throwing money away on rent. Weekends, food was brought in by their parents from the farm to help offset the cost of living in the city. Eventually, their sister Winnie joined her brothers. They attended Isaac Newton High School a few blocks away. Kurelek was at the top of his class in German, and did well in all the other subjects. Just around the corner from the house was St. Mary the Protectoress Ukrainian Orthodox church where he attended Ukrainian school, and found a very positive father figure in Rev. P. Majewsky.

Zaporozhian Cossacks, 1952

Kurelek graduated from high school in 1946, and enrolled in the fall of that year in the Arts General Course at the University of Manitoba, graduating with his degree in May 1949. By this time the family farm had been sold and his father had moved the family to Vinemount, Ontario near Hamilton. Kurelek had developed an early interest in art, which was not encouraged by his hard-working parents. Despite this, he enrolled at the Ontario College of Art (OCA) in Toronto. His explanation to his father was that there was money to be made in commercial art. In fact, he had no intention of going into commercial art. During this time, he worked at odd jobs to support himself, such as at a carwash on University Ave. At OCA, he found himself to be the only student with a university degree. Here, he studied the great contemporary Mexican artists: Diego Rivera, David Alfaro Siqueiros, José Clemente Orozco. His innate appeal and love of murals may have originated in his boyhood, when in his absence his father ventured one day upstairs and into his son's room to discover, much to his horror, the walls covered in unseemly illustrations.

Kurelek's friends at the OCA told him about the Instituto Allende in San Miguel, Mexico, which might grant him a scholarship if he produced something worthwhile. Fired by the thought of studying with one of the great Mexican mural painters, he painted his first self-portrait. Though he studied at the Ontario College of Art in Toronto and at the Instituto Allende in Mexico, he was primarily self-taught from books. Zaporozhian Cossacks, a gift to his father, is the last painting Kurelek did before leaving for Europe for the first time, and shows the influence of the Mexican muralists on his work.

== England ==
By his mid-twenties he had moved to England. In 1952, suffering from clinical depression and emotional problems, he admitted himself into the Maudsley Psychiatric Hospital in London. There he was treated for schizophrenia. In hospital he painted, producing The Maze, a dark depiction of his tortured youth. His experience in the hospital was documented in the LIFE Science Library book The Mind, published in 1965.

In this hospital, Kurelek met an occupational therapist who changed the course of his spiritual life. Margaret Smith brought him a book of poems, wrapped in a dust jacket that she had made of a Catholic newspaper. "I was a staunch atheist at the time...," Kurelek recalled, and upon discovering her faith, teased her about it. Later, he asked her if she was praying for him, and she answered, "Yes, I am." From here, they began to attend church services together. He took a correspondence course from the church, and met with Father Edward Holloway, a theologian trained at the English College in Rome, who helped him over some final stumbling blocks. In February 1957, Kurelek entered the Roman Catholic Church by a ceremony of conditional baptism. Margaret Smith, and his friend David John, a sculptor who did work for the church, were his godparents.

He was transferred from the Maudsley to the Netherne Hospital, where he stayed from November 1953 to January 1955, to work with Edward Adamson (1911–1996), a pioneer of art therapy. At Netherne he produced three masterpieces - Where Am I? Who Am I? Why Am I? (donated to the American Visionary Arts Museum by Adamson at its inauguration in 1995), I Spit On Life, and A Ball of Twine and Other Nonsense. In 1984, when the Art Gallery of Ontario exhibited Selections from the Edward Adamson Collection, Adamson donated to the Ontario Psychiatric Association a large pencil drawing by Kurelek of one of the interiors of Netherne Hospital, showing a group of patients at leisure.

== Framer ==
By the end of 1956, Kurelek was working for F.A. Pollak Limited, an elegant framing shop near Buckingham Palace. He worked here for 25 months. Frederick Pollak, an Austrian Jew, who had fled from Germany in the thirties and settled in London in 1938 establishing his shop for the framing and restoration of antiques, had made frames for the Louvre. Framing was an art that dated back to the Renaissance, and a single frame could cost thousands of pounds and require months of work. Pollak's became another school for Kurelek, where he learned the closely guarded secrets of gilding, which eventually found their way into his techniques as a painter. His apprenticeship at Pollak's, building and restoring frames, would serve him in a practical way until a few years before his death. When he returned to Canada in 1959, the Isaacs Gallery in Toronto immediately recognized the skills in framing that he had acquired in Europe. In later years, Avrom Isaacs commented that Kurelek would take more time building a frame than actually painting its canvas. Isaacs became Kurelek's agent for life; it was a business arrangement that remained unwritten. Glimmering Tapers round the Day's Dead Sanctities from 1970 is part of his Nature, Poor Stepdame series, and indicates that he was still building frames for his own paintings though quite renowned as an artist by this time.

== Canadian artist ==
Kurelek's first exhibition at the Isaac's Gallery was from March 26 to April 7, 1960. The show had 20 paintings. Among them, both his self-portraits (1950, and 1957); 3 Trompe-l'œil, paintings of a kind which had won him a place for three years in succession in the Royal Academy Summer Exhibition; Remorse from his hospital period; the Brueghel-like Farm Children's Games in Western Canada, a forerunner of his children's paintings to come; Saw-Sharpener, a look at his days as a lumberjack; When I Have Come Back Home; The Modern Tower of Babel; Behold Man Without God, this last reflecting the beginning of a change in attitude to prayer and the church. Though he was working on his The Passion of Christ According to St. Matthew series by this time, none of these religious paintings were included as they would be unsaleable. Canadian poet John Robert Colombo, for whom Kurelek had recently illustrated his first book of poetry, best describes the opening: "There were a lot of strange looking people, not the usual art crowd. Bill looked terribly out of place at his own opening. He had a reddish complexion and looked like a lumberjack; he looked as if he were in the wrong country, the wrong century, the wrong situation. It didn't look as if he had produced this work!" The Isaacs' popular opening nights drew city sophisticates, affecting the bohemian dress of their day. This time they contrasted sharply with Kurelek, his parents, and their Ukrainian friends. Nonetheless, it was the largest crowd the gallery had ever drawn, and by the following year the Isaac's Gallery had moved into a larger building.

In 1961, the women's committee of the Art Gallery of Ontario invited the prestigious Alfred Barr from the Museum of Modern Art in New York City to visit and select a Canadian painting for his museum's collection. At that time abstract expressionism was in vogue. Barr arrived and astonished them by choosing a painting by Kurelek: Hailstorm in Alberta. When the ladies committee telephoned Kurelek to come to the AGO to meet with Barr, he did not even know that Av Isaacs had entered one of his paintings into the competition. Living economically at the time, Kurelek offered to take a streetcar, but they talked him into taking a cab which was sent for him.

Kurelek first visited the Catholic Information Centre at Bathurst and Bloor streets in Toronto in November 1959. Its emphasis at the time was the instruction and encouragement of converts, which fit in with his recent conversion. He soon found himself attending twice a week, helping out on one of its committees. Here he met Jean Andrews: "She not only had a charming smile, she was a real beauty too." Jean was a nurse, Anglo-Canadian, and part of Our Lady of the Wayside Praesidium at the centre, "it was devoted to rehabilitating prostitutes and dope addicts - a rather brave kind of Christian charity work that I admired." In her mid-thirties, about the same age as him, she was interested in children and having a family of her own. Their courtship was encouraged by the centre and on October 8, 1962, the couple wed. He titled a painting of his wife which he did the year they were married: Mendelssohn in Canadian Winter, as she enjoyed listening to Mendelssohn's violin concerto very much. In it, his wife was seated in a plain church-basement background; five years later he repainted the background to the current one portending a gloomy future, in keeping with his didactic work. The atmosphere that it most likely had originally was that of Green Sunday as this painting pre-dates his didactic period.

Kurelek's marriage was swiftly fruitful, with three children born by 1966. They would go on to adopt a fourth child.

== Didactic Art ==
In May 1963, Kurelek's "Experiments in Didactic Art" exhibition opened at the Isaac's gallery, with the new works: The Day the Bomb Fell on Hamilton, Hell (The Worm That Dies Not), The Wage of Sin Is Death, and Dinnertime on the Prairies. About Dinnertime on the Prairies, Paul Duval wrote, "I cannot recall any Canadian religious painting to equal it for sheer dramatic impact." John Robert Colombo wrote about this painting: "an almost perfect combination of the prairies and the religious image". Elizabeth Kilbourn wrote about the show: "If this is didactic art, I would willingly expose myself to more even at the risk of conversion." In 1964, on a trip back to Stonewall and the bog, Kurelek's diary records him still struggling with how to fuse his religious message with his nature paintings. Harry Malcolmson had the answer for him when he gave him a negative review in the next didactic show of 1966. Malcolmson wrote: "satire generally implies making a point by indirection. There is about as much indirection in Kurelek's sledge hammer attack as in the Ten Commandments.... This is not so much an art show as a fire and brimstone sermon exhorting us to right conduct." Kurelek took this criticism to heart and in the didactic shows following, made his paintings subtler and borrowed long poetic titles for them, i.e. from the poet Francis Thompson's poem "The Hound of Heaven" for his Nature, Poor Stepdame series. Thy Young Skyey Blossoms from this series illustrates the more poetic approach to his didactic paintings.

== Ethnicity ==
Alongside his didactic paintings, Kurelek was also continuing with his more conventional ones. In the fall of 1964, he painted twenty paintings to honour his father, and a couple of years later another to honour his mother, though in the latter he could not restrain sermonizing outright in write-ups for the paintings. His lengthy awkward sermons placed Christianity before the hardship of pioneer women. "Mercifully, the texts had very little circulation, and the paintings were praise indeed for the pioneer women who helped to build this country." Kurelek's awareness of his Ukrainian ethnicity began in 1964 with his first return to the prairies to paint since leaving in 1949. His painting Manitoba Party is at the beginning of this period (he paints himself as a child hiding under the table inside the tent). This growing ethnic awareness in himself was met by a growing social awareness in the Ukrainian community, and in 1965, Anna Balan, Olga Hamara, and Stella Olynyk from the Ukrainian Women's Association of Canada approached him for a series for the Canadian Centennial in 1967, intended to celebrate Ukrainian women and how they helped to shape Canadian pioneer life. The ladies wanted to upgrade their community from the folk arts, and invited Kurelek to help. He titled his series: "Ukrainian Woman Pioneer in Canada". His write-up this time simply thanked the ladies of UWAC for their help along the way with the project.

Originally Ukrainian Orthodox, and briefly a professed atheist, Kurelek, converted to the Roman Catholic Church in 1957, by 1959 had started on his St. Matthew's Passion series, 160 paintings on the Passion of Christ. He completed it in 1970. All 160 paintings inaugurated the opening of the new St. Volodymyr Institute in Toronto, as its first art show on February 26, 1970. The Kolankiwskys, who attended the opening, showed up at suppertime on the Kureleks' doorstep. They were planning to open an Art Gallery in Niagara Falls and wanted to purchase the entire series. Having no hope of selling any of these paintings, now with an entire gallery to be devoted to them, Kurelek saw this as nothing less than a miracle. That same year the Kolankiwskys organized a three-week tour of Soviet Ukraine, of the art galleries and churches. Kurelek went along, and was allowed by the Soviet authorities to visit his father's village, see the house where his father was born, and spend four brief hours with his relatives.

== Author ==
Kurelek met May Cutler in June 1971. They were introduced by Mira Godard during his exhibition of "The Last Days" series at the Marlborough Godard Gallery in Montreal, Quebec. Cutler wondered if he would do a children's book for her. That book became A prairie boy's winter, his first book as a published author. Two years later the twenty original paintings for the book were exhibited at this same gallery. The ten made available for sale were gone in half an hour. People unable to buy one traveled to Toronto, where the other ten were sold just as quickly the following week at the Isaacs' Gallery. On the heels of this success, a series of other Kurelek books by Tundra quickly followed. Cutler wrote later to Robert Fulford that she was the first person to ask Kurelek to do a book: "Now everyone wants Kurelek to do books." He wrote and illustrated a series of children's books, several of which have become modern classics. In 1974 he illustrated a new edition of W. O. Mitchell's Who Has Seen the Wind. He won the Amelia Frances Howard-Gibbon Illustrator's Award for A Prairie Boy's Winter in 1974 and A Prairie Boy's Summer in 1976.

Kurelek's personal ethnic awareness translated into a growing recognition of others' ethnicity. In 1973 at a conference on ethnic studies in Toronto, Kurelek met Abe Arnold who became his collaborator on the book Jewish Life in Canada. Helen Worthington of the Toronto Star called them Canada's odd couple. "One is a shy, sensitive, introverted and devout Ukrainian Catholic; the other is a brash, energetic, outgoing, and committed Jew." Kurelek's wife's Irish ancestry prompted him to work on an Irish series of paintings, and Quebec separatism, a French-Canadian in the hope of promoting peace. His bewilderment, that neither of these last two series found a publisher, overlooked that the success of the Jewish series was due to Abe Arnold's great efforts and promotion of it. Kurelek went on to do an Inuit series, travelling in Oct. 1975 to Pangnirtung in the Northwest Territories at that time, today Nunavut.

Kurelek also did a series of 20 paintings depicting the Nativity as if Christ had been born in various Canadian settings: an igloo, a trapper's cabin, a boxcar, a motel. He maintained a cottage near Combermere, Ontario, where he got his inspiration for a book of paintings entitled The Polish Canadians, and was a friend of the nearby Madonna House Apostolate. His visits to Ukraine in 1970 and again in 1977, were published posthumously in To My Father's Village.

== Travels ==
Kurelek hitchhiked from Canada to Mexico in 1950 and the Instituto Allende in San Miguel. In 1952, he arrived in England at the Maudsley Hospital. While here, he took a three-week trip to Europe to look for a school of art where he might study. He went to Vienna, behind the Iron Curtain, and saw the eight large Brueghels on display at the Kunsthistorisches Museum. In Belgium and the Netherlands, he saw Van Eyck's altarpiece, as well as paintings by Bosch and Brueghel. While in London, he spent time at the art galleries: the Tate; the National Gallery that carried Vincent van Gogh and Bosch's The Mocking of Christ.

Following his conversion, he visited Lourdes in 1958, and took a trip to the Holy Land in 1959, which in itself was somewhat of an adventure. First taking the Orient Express, again behind the Iron Curtain, through Yugoslavia and Turkey, he had himself smuggled into the Holy Land on an American grain cargo boat from İskenderun to Beirut. Then, by plane he went to Jerusalem. Here he visited the sites of Calvary and Christ's tomb combined by that time into the Church of the Holy Sepulchre; the Upper Room, scene of the Last Supper; the Garden of Gethsemane; Lazarus's tomb in Bethany on the other side of Mount Olivet; and Bethlehem, with its Church of the Nativity; before trekking by foot over the strip of no man's land into Israel, conscious all the time of traversing holy ground, the road the Holy Family had traveled. His experience of the Holy Land, which in his eyes had changed little from two thousand years earlier, is reflected in the faces, places, and landscapes depicted in his series The Passion of Christ According to St. Matthew. He returned to London by way of Rome.

In 1969, he took a trip around the world, stopping in South Africa to visit his sister Sandy, then to Calcutta to visit a mission school in Darjeeling, and finally to Hong Kong to visit his foster-child. In 1970, he took his first trip of two to visit his father's village in Soviet Ukraine. In Canada, he travelled to all the places that are found in his paintings.

== Last years ==
The split in Kurelek between his creativity and religion continued to the end of his life. In 1975, while on a pilgrimage to Lourdes again, he completed 73 illustrations for Bohdan Melnyk's translation of Ivan Franko's Fox Mykyta. Initially, he knew nothing about Franko, but when suggested that the Ukrainian classic should be part of mainstream culture, went ahead with the project. "Since greed, hypocrisy, opportunism are often self-defeating, Fox astutely plays upon these moral flaws. The drawings sparkle with energy, humor, and hard-won wisdom of both Franko and Kurelek." Having finished the illustrations, Kurelek read the book more closely and voiced the concern that Franko's fox was using clerical disguises for selfish ends. He held up the publication of the book and it was only published posthumously.

In 1976, a similar drama unfolded with author Gloria Kupchenko Frolick and her novella The Chicken Man. Kurelek completed 15 paintings to illustrate it, and then had second thoughts. "If she wished to use his work to illustrate her fiction, she would have to change the text, turning the abortion into a miscarriage performed by an unqualified midwife." Despite his knowing that it was based on a real story. The author changed the story to the illustrator's liking, and it was published.

In January 1976, Kurelek painted the mural at the St. Thomas More College Chapel in Saskatoon. It was a culmination of many influences, the Mexican muralists, Breughel, and his Christianity. Having trouble with heights, his assistant Geralyn Jansen climbed to the apex and painted God into the mural in the aniconic image of the sun.

Kurelek was made a member of the Royal Canadian Academy of Arts. In 1976, he was made a Member of the Order of Canada.

He died of cancer in Toronto in 1977. His archives, and a substantial body of his work, including the Passion series mentioned above, are held at Niagara Falls Art Gallery and Library and Archives Canada.

== In popular culture ==
In 1981, the hard rock band Van Halen released their fourth album titled Fair Warning, with a cover that features several closeup details of William Kurelek's painting The Maze from 1953.

== Record sale prices ==
At the Cowley Abbott Auction of Important Canadian & International Art, December 6, 2023, #Lot #6, Kurelek's Streets Pier, Worthing, circa 1957, gouache, 30 x 21.5 ins ( 76.2 x 54.6 cms ), Auction Estimate: $25,000.00 - $35,000.00, realized a price of $144,000.00. At the same auction house in the fall of 2024, Important Canadian & International Art, November 28, Lot #6, Kurelek's A Little Girl and Her Snowman (1973), Auction Estimate: $12,000.00 - $15,000.00, realized a price of $216,000.00.

== Publications ==
=== Solo works ===
- O Toronto (1973). Toronto: New Press.
- Someone with Me: An Autobiography (1973). Ithaca, New York: Centre for Improvement of Undergraduate Education, Cornell University.
- A Prairie Boy's Winter (1973). ISBN 0-88776-102-X.
- Lumberjack (1974). ISBN 0-88776-378-2
  - German: Die Holzfäller. Transl. Ilse Stasmann. Jungbrunnen, Vienna 1982
- A Prairie Boy's Summer. (1975). ISBN 0-88776-116-X.
- The Passion of Christ (1975). Niagara Falls: Niagara Falls Art Gallery & Museum.
- Kurelek's Canada (1975). Toronto: Pagurian Press Limited.
- The Last of the Arctic (1976). Toronto: Pagurian Press Limited.
- A Northern Nativity (1976). ISBN 978-0-88776-099-0.
- Fields (1976). Montreal: Tundra Books.
- Someone with Me: An Autobiography (1980). (revised condensed reprint) Toronto, McClelland and Stewart, 1980. ISBN 0-7710-4564-6.
- The Ukrainian Pioneer (1980). Niagara Falls: Niagara Falls Art Gallery. Based on the 1971 mural of the same title.
- The Polish Canadians (1981). Montreal: Tundra Books.
- Someone with Me (reprint) (1988). Niagara Falls: Niagara Falls Art Gallery.
- To My Father's Village (1988). Montreal: Tundra Books. ISBN 978-0-88776-220-8.

=== In collaboration ===
- They Sought A New World (1985) Montreal: Tundra Books. Text by Margaret Engelhart, with snippets of the artist's commentary and paintings illustrating Engelhart's text.
- With historian Abraham Arnold. Jewish Life In Canada (1976). Edmonton: Hurtig Publishers.
- Kurelek Country (1999) Toronto: Key Porter Books. Preface by his dealer, Av Isaacs; biographical essay by historian Ramsay Cook.
- With Joan Murray (1983). Kurelek's Vision of Canada. Edmonton: Hurtig Publishers. Exhibition catalogue.

=== Works illustrated by him ===
- Kupchenko-Frolick, G. (1989). The Chicken Man. Stratford, Ontario: Williams-Wallace Publishers.
- Ivan Franko. (1978). Fox Mykyta. Montreal: Tundra Books. (72 illustrations.)
- Mitchell, W.O. (1976). Who Has Seen the Wind. Toronto: Macmillan of Canada.
- De Marco, D. (1974). Abortion in Perspective. Cincinnati: Hiltz & Hayes Publishing. (Section head illustrations.)

=== Selected exhibitions ===
- Vanishing Point: A Rural Perspective. Alberta Government House, 2010–2012.
- Kurelek: The Messenger. Touring Winnipeg, Victoria, and Hamilton, 2011–2012.
- Kurelek from the Community: An autobiography through his art and writings, Ukrainian Cultural Heritage Village, 2012
- In 2020, Kurelek was in a group show titled Next Year's Country, linked with artists as seemingly distant as Louise Noguchi at the Remai Modern, Saskatoon.
- William Kurelek: The Presence of Melancholy, Winnipeg Art Gallery, 2022–2023.
- William Kurelek: Jewish Life in Canada, McMichael Canadian Art Collection, 2022.

== Film and video about him ==
- Artist's Studio, a film by Halya Kuchmij.
- William Kurelek's The Maze (1969 & 2011). Directed by Robert M. Young and David Grubin, produced and reimagined by Nick Young and Zack Young. 65 minutes. MachinEyes.
- Kurelek (1967). Directed by William Pettigrew. 10 minutes, 7 seconds, colour. National Film Board of Canada.
- Pacem in Terris (c. 1970). Directed by John Giffin, written by Murray Abraham. 14 minutes, 23 seconds, colour. Film Arts.
- The Ukrainian Pioneers (1975). Directed by John Giffin, written by Juliette Mannock. 13 minutes, 51 seconds, colour. Film Arts.
