= José Cuéllar =

American anthropologist, musician and educator (1941–2026)

- Born: José Bernardo Cuéllar; April 3, 1941; San Antonio, Texas, U.S.
- Died: January 21, 2026 (aged 84); San Francisco, California, U.S.
- Other names: José B. Cuéllar; Dr. Loco
- Occupations: Academic; Musician
- Spouse: Stacie Powers Cuéllar

José Bernardo Cuéllar (April 3, 1941 – January 21, 2026), also credited as José B. Cuéllar and known musically as Dr. Loco, was an American anthropologist, musician and educator. He was professor emeritus of Latina/Latino Studies at San Francisco State University (SFSU), where he taught courses in Chicano/Latino studies, music, and cultural performance. Cuéllar is recognized for his work as a scholar of Chicano culture and as the bandleader of Dr. Loco’s Rockin’ Jalapeño Band, as well as for his contributions to the multimedia project surrounding the film Alambrista: The Director’s Cut and his research and performance with ancient Mesoamerican ocarinas at Harvard University.

== Early life and education ==
Cuéllar was born and raised in San Antonio, Texas, where his early experiences in a predominantly Mexican American community shaped his cultural and musical foundations. As a high school senior, he used savings originally intended for business school tuition to purchase a tenor saxophone, a decision he later described as pivotal in redirecting his life toward music and cultural activism. He began performing professionally in Texas with the Del-Kings, a Chicano R&B band, before serving four years in the United States Air Force, where he trained as a dental technician.

After completing his military service, Cuéllar studied music at Golden West College in Huntington Beach, California, during the late 1960s, a period marked by the rise of the Chicano Movement and anti–Vietnam War activism in which he became increasingly engaged. Cuéllar later earned a B.A. in anthropology from California State University, Long Beach, followed by an M.A. and Ph.D. in anthropology from the University of California, Los Angeles.

== Academic career ==
Cuéllar taught in the Department of Latina/Latino Studies at San Francisco State University, where he last held the title of professor emeritus. At SFSU he offered courses on topics such as comparative music folklore, oral history methods, Aztec philosophy, Mexican American history and heritage, Indigenous cultures of the Americas, Latino studies, Latina/o media, and Latina/o transculturation.

Beyond his teaching, Cuéllar has been associated with the Moses Mesoamerican Archive and Research Project (MMARP) at Harvard University, an interdisciplinary initiative on Mesoamerican religions and cultures.

== Music and performance ==
Cuéllar is internationally known as "Dr. Loco", the founding director of Dr. Loco’s Rockin’ Jalapeño Band. His work as a performer draws on Chicano and Mexican American musical traditions and is closely tied to his academic interest in Chicano culture. Harvard Magazine describes him as a musician and Latin American scholar, noting his role as “saxophonist Dr. Loco” of the Rockin’ Jalapeño Band.

He produced and performed on four music recordings with the band: Con Safos (1991), Movimiento Music (1992), Puro Party (1995), and Barrio Ritmos & Blues (1998). He also composed and performed the musical soundtrack for the director’s cut of the film Alambrista!.

The Mexican rock band Maldita Vecindad referred to Cuéllar as “el último pachuco,” highlighting his role as one of the last traditional barrio storytellers within Chicano musical culture.

== Alambrista project ==
Cuéllar played a central musical role in the 2000s relaunch of Robert M. Young’s 1977 film Alambrista! as Alambrista: The Director’s Cut, a multimedia project that combined the re-edited film, a new soundtrack, and a companion book of essays. In a review of the volume Alambrista and the U.S.-Mexico Border: Film, Music, and Stories of Undocumented Immigrants (2004), ReVista notes that the soundtrack for the director’s cut was created by “Dr. Loco & Sus Tiburones del Norte” and highlights Cuéllar’s contribution as a Raza Studies professor at SFSU who provided notes on composing the film’s music.

David Carrasco wrote that “it’s really Dr. Loco’s music that makes a new version of the film,” giving the story “new nuances and new power.” Cuéllar’s description of the “Okie Dokie Shuffle” emphasizes musical transculturation, bringing together Anglo and Mexican American traditions to reflect the hybrid social world depicted in the film.

== Mesoamerican instrument research ==
Cuéllar was active as a researcher and performer of ancient Mesoamerican wind instruments, especially ocarinas, through his collaboration with Harvard University’s Peabody Museum of Archaeology and Ethnology. As a Hrdy Fellow at the Peabody Museum in 2012, he was invited to research and record more than two hundred ocarinas from the museum’s collections. In an article titled “They Needed to Be Heard,” Davíd Carrasco describes Cuéllar as an anthropologist and musician who sought to “breathe life” into the instruments by playing them again after centuries of silence.

Harvard Magazine reports that a performance by Cuéllar led curators to reconnect the instruments he was playing with hundreds of similar ocarinas stored in the museum’s vaults. His work contributed to the exhibition Ocarinas of the Americas: Music Made in Clay, where his performances helped reintroduce ancient Mesoamerican soundscapes to modern audiences.

== Death ==
Cuéllar died from lung cancer in San Francisco on January 21, 2026, at the age of 85.

== Honors and awards ==
Cuéllar’s honors, awards, and grants include:

- Rockefeller Humanities Gateway Fellowship (1997–98)
- Diversity in Teaching and Learning Distinguished Faculty Award (2000)
- Ford Foundation Grant (2001–2003)
- Distinguished Alumnus Award, College of Arts and Letters, California State University, Long Beach (2002)
- Pillar of Achievement Award, Golden West College (2003)

== Selected works ==
=== Recordings ===
- Con Safos (1991), with Dr. Loco’s Rockin’ Jalapeño Band
- Movimiento Music (1992)
- Puro Party (1995)
- Barrio Ritmos & Blues (1998)
- Soundtrack for Alambrista: The Director’s Cut

=== Publications ===
- Cuéllar, José (2001). "Chicanismo". The Oxford Encyclopedia of Mesoamerican Cultures. Oxford University Press.
- Cuéllar, José (2001). "El Saxofón in Tejano and Norteño Music". ¡Puro Conjunto! An Album in Words and Pictures. University of Texas Press. ISBN 9780292781740.
- Cuéllar, José (2004). "Contribution on composing the music for Alambrista: The Director's Cut". Alambrista and the U.S.-Mexico Border. University of New Mexico Press. ISBN 9780826333766.
