= The Maze (painting) =

1953 painting by William Kurelek

The Maze (Canada, 1953), Gouache on board, 91 × 121 cm, Bethlem Royal Hospital in London

The Maze is a painting that Canadian artist William Kurelek produced while a patient at Maudsley Hospital in London. Kurelek was born in 1927 into a Ukrainian immigrant community in Alberta, Canada, and suffered through childhood from the oppression of his farmer father. As a young adult he grew mentally ill, and at Maudsley received not only treatment but a room to paint. The Maze can be interpreted as Kurelek's attempt to justify this privilege; as Kurelek writes, "I had to impress the hospital staff as being a worthwhile specimen to keep on."

The Maze was painted in gouache colors. Kurelek describes it as "a painting of the inside of my skull." That skull has been split open vertically to reveal various compartments inside. Through the eyes, nose, and mouth we can see the rest of the body lying in a wheat field. Inside the skull itself, each compartment holds a scrap of paper, representing a memory or thought. The center compartment, however, holds only a white rat, which represents Kurelek's spirit. The rat is wound up and inert, having run through the maze of the skull chewing a piece of each scrap of paper and finding it undigestible.

The skull in the painting has been opened up by ribbon, to suggest the work of the doctors at the mental hospital, attempting to make a proper diagnosis. Kurelek depicted the rat spirit as inert, unwilling to leave his prison even though it has been opened up for him. This was Kurelek's way of showing his doctors what their job was. He writes, in his autobiography, "Now clean me out, I challenge you scientists, and put me back together again – a happy, balanced, mature, fulfilled personality. Lift that rat out and unwind him and let him run free!"

== Background ==
After being disenchanted with several art schools in Canada and Mexico, Kurelek took a cargo ship from Montreal to London. He arrived in 1952 with, as he describes, "two express purposes." Those were to finish his art schooling and to be admitted into a psychiatric hospital, where he may find a cure for his depression and his chronic eye pains. He read about Maudsley's reputation in a Montreal library, so the day after his arrival in London he admitted himself.

In his autobiography, Kurelek writes that, leading up to the painting of The Maze, he was growing disillusioned with psychotherapy and was desperate for a cure. Part of the anxiety came from the fear that he would not have enough money to stay much longer, so in his mind, "something [had] to be done." But his main doctor, Dr. Cormier, was unhelpful in his "serenity and aloofness." Kurelek writes, "Just as the protest marchers of today despair of attracting attention by peaceful means, and sometimes set themselves alight with gasoline or do physical damage to property, I decided violence against myself was the only recourse I now had." One evening Kurelek cut his arm, and when he revealed this to Cormier the next day, the doctor inquired into the circumstances but didn't panic.

After the episode Kurelek was invited back as an inpatient to be treated by a different doctor, Dr. Carstairs, who appears in the film William Kurelek's The Maze. Carstairs provided Kurelek with a room that doubled as a studio where he could paint. Kurelek felt very strongly that he had to justify his being there for the doctors, so he commenced painting The Maze, "depicting all [his] psychic problems in a neat package."

== Interpretation ==
The following interpretations of The Maze were provided by Kurelek himself, in his autobiography Someone with Me and his accounts for the Bethlem Royal Hospital, which houses the painting today.

=== Outside the Skull ===
The rat spirit at the center cavity of the skull now has a view to the outside, but the outside world is not depicted as an attractive place either.

Wheatfield backdrop: The backdrop of the painting is a wheat field being devoured by grasshoppers under the blazing hot sun (this derives from an incident on the Kurelek farm when William was a boy). Kurelek writes, "this refers to my belief that my problems stemmed in a large part from my father taking out on me his raging impotence in the face of farming failures."

Body of the skull: The body, seen through the eyes, nose and mouth, is in a prostrate position, to imply that Kurelek "couldn't stand up to life any longer."

Excrement: Lying before the nose, seen directly through it, is a pile of excrement with flies buzzing around. Kurelek compares this to that which he and other children would leave in the fields, and for him it has Swiftian and Shakespearean implications: "the world is a dung heap and the human race is a cloud of flies crawling over it to suck a living out."

Mouth cavern: The area of the skull's mouth has been filled with sawdust, covering up a poetry book, a classical record envelope, and a Michelangelo drawing. This was Kurelek's way of saying that his artistic sensibility, the last thing he had to live for, was gone, buried by what he referred to as his depersonalization.

The burs: In the caverns above the mouth area there are several spiky burs; when Kurelek was young he had the sensation that these were stuffing up his throat. One has been dissected, cutting through many layers, only to find a worm in the center. This was a reference to the doctors' effort of analysis and diagnosis turning out to be "not worth the trouble." Another of the burs is inverted with spikes pointed inward, piercing through a small child. On either side of the bur is a smiling face and an angry face, representing two sides to Kurelek's father. His father is referenced as another bur behind, "the hard domineering blue bur, opening up the mushy yellow bur, my mother, to release a common lot of burs, my brothers and sisters, and one unique orange one - myself."

=== Inside the Skull ===
==== Politics (Upper Left) ====
The Ukraine panel: In this panel an apparently Ukrainian peasant woman is bound to a pole and gagged, with a giant faceless figure towering over her. The woman, representing Ukraine itself, is about to be raped by Russia, and her plight is a depiction of Kurelek's one-time attachment to Ukrainian nationalism. The plight caused depression for Kurelek, as he asked himself, "would I got to war to defend or save her?...I had in mind the words of the World War I poet – Wilfred Owen, 'It is sweet and fitting to die for one’s country' – the old lie."

The Chinese soldier panel: The picture in this panel is designed as a shield with a crest on it. It depicts a Chinese soldier in Korea bayonetting Kurelek. This image is meant to represent his fear of war, which derived from his father keeping him out of the army.

The political protest panel: In this panel men, women and children parade through the streets with protest signs, the foremost sign reading "WAR IS PEACE." This is a representation of Kurelek's disillusionment with the "idealistic zeals" of his "Communist and fellow traveller friends." He writes, "The ones who yell the loudest for liberty are the biggest oppressors when they succeed in overthrowing the current conservative system."

==== Childhood (Upper Right and Top) ====
The small boy panel: In this panel a small boy sits alone on a field with children playing and other activity in the background. Kurelek describes this as "an actual memory of the time my mother complained to the teacher about us Kurelek children being bullied and then they retaliated by shunning us altogether."

The bully panel: In this panel Kurelek represents himself being beaten up and bloodied by a macho bully. It is not an actual memory but something he always feared. In the foreground are a boy pointing and smiling and a girl watching. This is more grounded in memory, for Kurelek writes, "The girls who tormented me especially rejoiced when I was knocked down for trying to stand up for my rights."

The fish panel: In this panel five fish lie in a puddle of water on the prairie while two others lie in an adjacent dry spot. Kurelek recalled killing them, as they had "no escape," with a slingshot with his brother. He then thought this was an appropriate symbol for "the cruelty of such a merciless closed society as one finds in a country schoolhouse." Kurelek also called this panel a visualization of "[his] father's philosophy, the survival of the craftiest, pointed out by the plight of the foolish fish."

The peasant panel: In this panel a peasant man is kicking his barefoot son from the house into a snowstorm. Inside the house are several other children seated at what is likely the dinner table. This again represents not an actual memory but a fear of what could happen. Kurelek also claims it represents "the cruelty of the mid-European parent who figures he owns his children because he gave them life."

==== Social Pleasure (Middle Left) ====
The merry-go-round panel: In this panel a merry-go-round strings along dancing puppet couples. Kurelek calls them rag dolls with smiles sewn on their faces, unable to actually feel pleasure in the experience on account of depersonalization. This depiction is based on dance classes at Maudsley Hospital. On the wall are painted wallflowers, "to commemorate those who can’t get invitations to dance."

The bull panel: In this panel a bull is running after a cow, dragging a nose iron behind him. His passion, represented by his red color, seemingly blocks out the pain of the nose iron. The bull, Kurelek writes, "represents my fear of the animal side of sex in me."

==== The Museum of Hopelessness (Middle Right) ====
This is one comparatively large panel representing hopelessness. It is Kurelek's depiction of "the uselessness of effort in a meaningless world." On the wall there is a poster series on the evolution of life, culminating in man. Another poster is titled "The Future," and it shows a giant mushroom cloud. The museum has several named installations, each described below:

- Courage - a determined individual banging his head against a brick wall
- Love - a pair of wooden puppets "going through the motion of kissing but feeling nothing because of depersonalization
- Patience - a glass pyramid precariously balanced on a ball
- Friendship - "an apparatus designed to work only if the victim stays primly in place at a safe distance: the frog daren’t struggle or he’ll make contact and get hurt by electric shock"
- Religion - a wooden crucifix stuck in an ant hill. It's almost destroyed from having been eaten away at by ants, representing rationalist and atheist arguments.
- Industry - a squirrel in a treadmill, to say that "the harder you work the more is expected of you"
- Continence - a boiling pot, to say "if you repress sex or anger they may perhaps some day blow up causing you hurt"
- Hope - a man trying to break out of the museum of hopelessness. His muscles, brain and backbone have been removed and his pickaxe has been blunted, rendering his attempt hopeless.

==== The Scientists (Lower Left) ====
The four compartments in the lower left of the skull depict a choice Kurelek had to make, between the outside world (the left most panel) and the hospital (the other three.) The test tube compartment depicts Kurelek's view of himself analyzed by the doctors, but the two leftward compartments represent two differing interpretations of that analysis: a benevolent conspiracy (below) and a malevolent persecution (above).

The snatches of sunshine panel: In this panel a man is crawling through a dark stretch of forest-like terrain, separated by a hedge barrier from a crowd of people walking in the sunshine. The subject passes several rays of light breaking through the hedge, in his struggle to move alongside the crowd. This panel depicts Kurelek out of the hospital but still cut off from "normal society."

The test tube panel: In this panel many doctors, several of them publicly known, are probing a human subject inside a test tube. Kurelek believed that science could provide a cure-all for all troubles, but at the same time found the doctors' constant watch over him to be sometimes unpleasant. He believed they were mostly Freudians and would trace most of his problems to sexual maladjustments, so he depicts his discomfort as nakedness in this panel. Above the half-naked subject in the test tube is a snake, functioning as a catalyst to reveal more about the subject. Kurelek writes, "In this case the doctor might introduce some extremely unpleasant idea at the conference that would make me squirm with embarrassment.”

The benevolent conspiracy panel: In this panel, each doctor makes a unique attempt to help and satisfy Kurelek. One uses a Trophy Chalice, representing honor. Another uses good food. Another brings a woman in to lie with him. Still another tries with "gentle, concerned nursing."

The malevolent persecution panel: In this panel many crows are attacking a pinned-down lizard, representing the other extreme of Kurelek's view of the doctors. He writes, "The doctors who dress in hospital whites are represented in their true color - black, just like birds of prey." He represented them as not actually caring if the subject is cured or not, though later he claimed this was a false idea, and attributed it to his father's phobia of hospitals. The father had developed the phobia from an incident with William during his college years. A doctor had recommended for him a tonsil operation. His parents refused to pay for it so William used money he had earned as a lumberjack. But something went wrong and Kurelek hemorrhaged, coughing blood everywhere, and lost consciousness. The next thing he knew he saw his parents standing before him "seething with anger" at what had happened. According to his autobiography, this was the first evidence for Kurelek that his parents actually cared.

==== Physical Destruction (Lower Right) ====
The self-mutilation panel: In this panel a young man is cutting open his arm and analyzing his bones. He is in a studio with a skeleton and several coffins, but chooses to look at "second-hand information," a drawing. Kurelek interprets this in several ways: 1) an attempt to discover by observation if he is real like other people, 2) an attempt to break out of his depersonalization by facing "the reality of death and the decay of the body," and 3) "a form of violent protest to force society to help [him] and pay attention to [his] needs."

The conveyor belt panel: In this panel a man is tied to a conveyor belt headed for death, with a clock tied to his feet. For Kurelek this represented not just himself but all mankind, as the "inevitability of death" is for everyone only a matter of time. The clock is there to report just how much time that is, and for the man that is supposed to be Kurelek it reads he is one-third of the way there.

== Out of the Maze ==
Soon after painting The Maze, Kurelek was transferred to Netherne Hospital. While under the care of Edward Adamson, "the father of art therapy in Britain," Kurelek continued to produce more masterpieces, several of which are still in the Adamson Collection. However, it was not the science of the doctors that led to his eventual recovery. Describing his walks on the Netherne grounds, he writes, "I walked and walked, going round and round in the labyrinth of my mind just as that rat in my painting. If the doctors didn’t seem able or interested in untangling the snarl, then I, at least, should do and try everything in my power before giving up." A year after painting The Maze, Kurelek attempted suicide.

Freedom at last from the prison of The Maze would come with Kurelek's later conversion to Roman Catholicism; this evolution is depicted in the film William Kurelek's The Maze. In 1971, he painted Out of the Maze which he presented as a gift to Maudsley Hospital. The work depicts Kurelek with his wife and four children saying grace at a picnic near a pond on the prairie. Ostensibly an image of peace, the painting holds reminders of a darker Kurelek vision. In the bottom left corner, a bisected skull reminds the viewer of the artist's troubled past. And in the far upper right, a dark storm is on the horizon.

This painting is part of the collection of the Bethlem Royal Hospital Archives and Museum, along with The Maze.

== Influences ==
Many have cited Hieronymus Bosch and Pieter Bruegel the Elder as influences for Kurelek's work in general, The Maze specifically. In his account of the painting in his autobiography Someone with Me, Kurelek cites Jonathan Swift as a major influence on the work, as well as Shakespeare. Kurelek writes, "the psychological symbols of The Maze gradually shifted to more spiritual ones. They took on the appearance of Swiftian satire."

== Legacy ==
Images of The Maze have been used in psychology classes, including that of James Maas at Cornell University. Maas was also involved in the making of the original film The Maze: The Story of William Kurelek (1969), which won a Red Ribbon Award for outstanding educational documentary in the 1972 American Film Festival. The film chronicles Kurelek's life through his paintings and on-camera revelations, using The Maze painting as the centerpiece. It has recently been expanded and re-imagined as a new film, William Kurelek's The Maze (2011). The new version provides higher resolution images of the paintings, adds an original musical score, animates characters within the paintings, and "gives us a far better understanding of at least one figure Kurelek depicted in his famously enigmatic 1953 painting: his father."

Some of the panels of the painting were used, without permission, for the cover art in the 1981 Van Halen album Fair Warning. This was the band's fourth album and its darkest yet, so the musicians sought imagery to match that tone. Alex Van Halen discovered The Maze, but did not consider using more than one of the panels. Instead, he initially just wanted to use one image: the "Courage" installation in the Museum of Hopelessness, wherein an individual is hopelessly ramming his head into a brick wall. In the end, the painting was "severely cropped and modified, ostensibly to highlight the most striking images inherent in the work."

== Sources ==
- Adamson, E. (1983). Art as Healing. London, Coventure
- "Biography", William Kurelek: The Messenger. Retrieved on 29 August 2013.
- "Fair Warning", Van Halen News Desk. Retrieved on 30 August 2013.
- Goddard, Peter (Spring 2012). "William Kurelek: The End Time", Canadian Art 110–4.
- Goddard, Peter. "Unravelling the puzzle of William Kurelek's The Maze", TheStar.com, Toronto, 8 November 2012. Retrieved on 1 August 2013.
- Grubin, David & Robert M. Young (Directors) (2011). William Kurelek's The Maze (Motion picture). Los Angeles: MACHINEYES.
- "In the Frame for June 2011", Bethlem Blog, London, 9 June 2011. Retrieved on 12 August 2013.
- "Kurelek, William (1927–1977) / The Maze / LDBTH149", Bethlem Royal Hospital: Archives and Museum Services, London. Retrieved on 27 August 2013.
- Kurelek, William. Someone With Me. Ithaca, NY: Center for the Improvement of Undergraduate Education, Cornell University, 1973.
- Walker, J. (1992). 'Glossary of Art, Architecture & Design since 1945', 3rd. ed. London, Library Association Publishing
- "William Kurelek (1927–1977): The Maze (Canada, 1953)", Peter Nahum At The Leicester Galleries, London. Retrieved on 1 August 2013.
