= Children of Fate: Life and Death in a Sicilian Family =

- Directed by: Andrew Young; Susan Todd
- Music by: John T. La Barbera
- Production company: Archipelago Films
- Distributed by: First Run Features
- Release date: 1993
- Running time: 85 minutes
- Country: United States
- Language: English

Children of Fate: Life and Death in a Sicilian Family is a 1993 documentary film about life in the slums of Palermo, Sicily, directed by Andrew Young and Susan Todd.

== Synopsis ==
The film is a sequel to Cortile Cascino, a 1961 documentary shot by Andrew Young's father, Robert M. Young, which depicted the eponymous Palermo slum and told the story of Angela Capra and her family. Children of Fate picks up the story 30 years on, showing Capra now separated from her husband, and the fates of her children.

== Awards ==
The film was nominated for an Academy Award for Best Documentary Feature.

Awards
Preceded by A Brief History of Time	Sundance Grand Jury Prize: Documentary; 1993	Succeeded by Freedom on My Mind
