= Human Error (film) =

- Directed by: Robert M. Young
- Starring: Caroline Ashley
- Release date: 2004
- Running time: 95 minutes
- Country: United States
- Language: English

Human Error is a 2004 film directed by Robert M. Young. It stars Caroline Ashley and Xander Berkeley.

== Cast ==
- Caroline Ashley as Catherine
- Xander Berkeley as Hanrahan
- Tom Bower as Merkin
- Sarah Clarke as Company Spokesperson
- Robert Knott as Dobbitt
