= Alambrista! =

1977 film by Robert M. Young

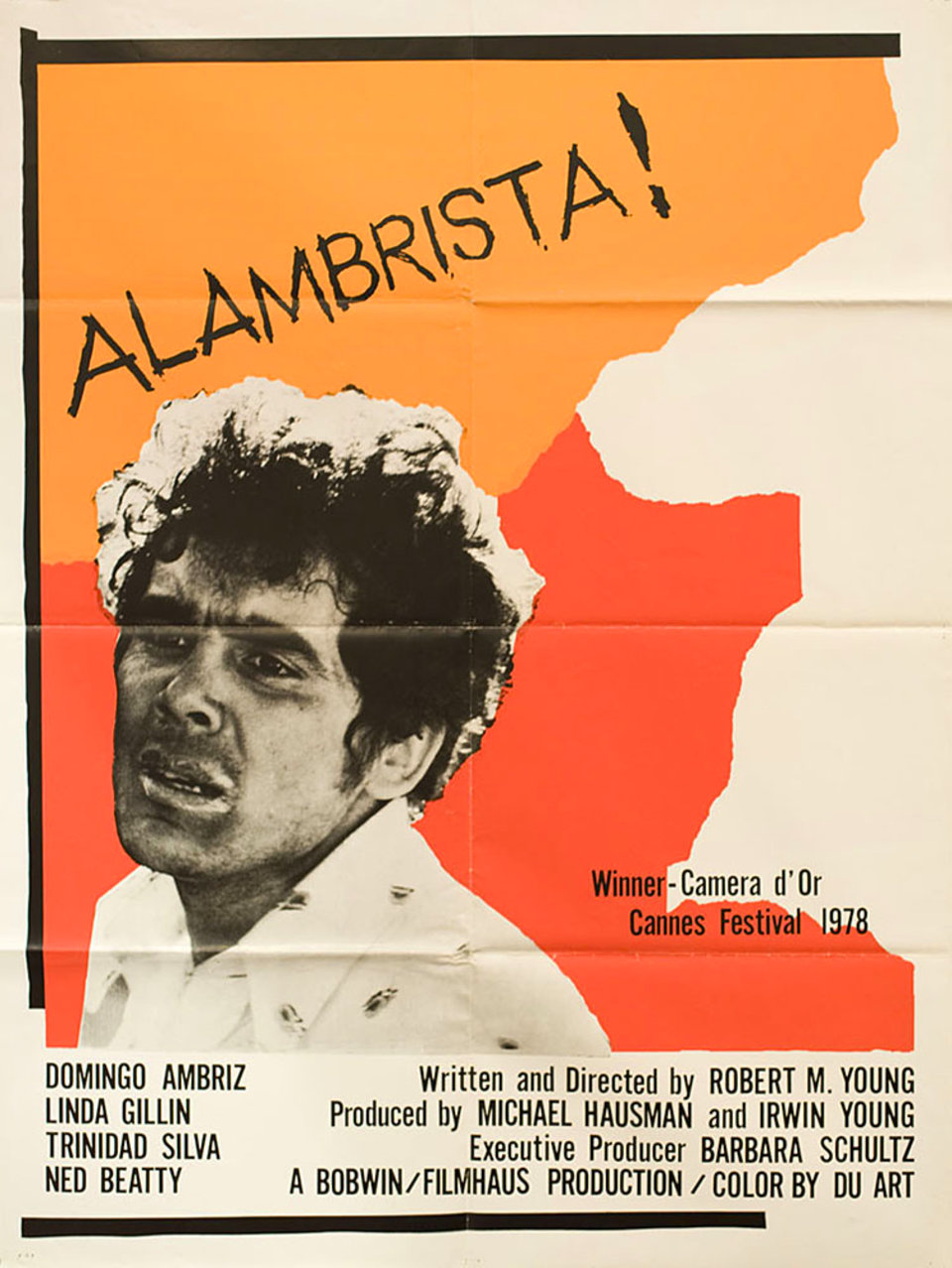
- Theatrical release poster
- Directed by: Robert M. Young
- Written by: Robert M. Young
- Produced by: Michael Hausman; Irwin Young
- Starring: Domingo Ambriz; Linda Gillen; Trinidad Silva; Ned Beatty
- Cinematography: Tom Hurwitz; Robert M. Young
- Edited by: Edward Beyer
- Music by: Michael Martin Murphey
- Production company: Filmhaus
- Distributed by: First Run Features
- Release date: October 16, 1977
- Running time: 110 mins.
- Country: United States
- Languages: English, Spanish

Alambrista! is a 1977 film directed by Robert M. Young and starring Domingo Ambriz and Trinidad Silva. It won four awards in 1977. In 2023, the film was selected for preservation in the United States National Film Registry by the Library of Congress as being "culturally, historically, or aesthetically significant".

== Outline ==
Roberto, a farmer from Michoacán, aims to cross the border to provide for his family. Upon reaching the United States, he finds himself fleeing from immigration authorities. Nevertheless, he encounters various individuals who offer him assistance.

== Cast ==
- Domingo Ambriz as Roberto
- Trinidad Silva as Joe
- Linda Gillen as Sharon
- Ned Beatty as Angelo Coyote
- Jerry Hardin as Man in cafe

In 2003, it was re-edited and remastered with a new soundtrack by Jose "Dr. Loco" Cuellar, Greg Landau, Francisco Herrera and Tomas Montoya and was re-released with a book on University of New Mexico Press.

== Awards ==
- Golden Camera – Cannes Film Festival (Robert M. Young)
- Interfilm Award – Mannheim-Heidelberg International Film Festival (Robert M. Young)
- Golden Seashell – San Sebastian International Film Festival (Robert M. Young)
- OCIC Award – San Sebastian International Film Festival (Robert M. Young)
- National Film Registry (Inducted)
