= Slave of Dreams =

- Directed by: Robert M. Young
- Written by: Ron Hutchinson
- Produced by: Dino De Laurentiis; Martha De Laurentiis
- Starring: Edward James Olmos; Sherilyn Fenn; Adrian Pasdar; Philip Newman
- Cinematography: Giuseppe Maccari
- Edited by: Norman Buckley
- Music by: Christopher Tyng
- Release date: December 10, 1995
- Running time: 95 minutes
- Country: United States
- Language: English

Slave of Dreams is a 1995 television film based on the story of Joseph in the Bible, directed by Robert M. Young, produced by Dino De Laurentiis and Martha De Laurentiis and written by Ron Hutchinson. The film stars Adrian Pasdar as Joseph, Sherilyn Fenn as Zulaikha and Edward James Olmos as Potiphar.

== Cast ==
- Edward James Olmos as Potiphar
- Sherilyn Fenn as Zulaikha
- Adrian Pasdar as Joseph
- Philip Newman as Nakht
- Nadia Sawalha as Ankh
- Nabil Shaban as Soothsayer
- Orso Maria Guerrini as Pharaoh
- Nevork Malikyan as Pharaoh's Adviser
- Anthony Samuel Selby as Etham
- Emanuele Carucci as Raneb

== See also ==
- List of historical drama films
