= Trinidad Silva =

American actor (1950–1988)

- Trinidad Silva in UHF (1989)
- Born: Trinidad Silva Jr. January 30, 1950; Mission, Texas, U.S.
- Died: July 31, 1988 (aged 38); Whittier, California, U.S.
- Occupation: Actor
- Years active: 1977–1988

Trinidad Silva Jr. (January 30, 1950 – July 31, 1988) was an American comedian and character actor who played small supporting roles in a number of films of the 1980s.

He is known for the roles of Jesus Martinez, a gang leader in the TV series Hill Street Blues; Frog in the film Colors; and Raul, the bizarre animal lover in "Weird Al" Yankovic's first film, UHF.

== Biography ==
Silva was born in Mission, Texas.

=== Death ===
On July 31, 1988, Silva, his wife, and toddler son had gone out to lunch after Sunday church services, and were returning home when a drunken driver drove through a red light into the driver's side of the family's pickup truck at an intersection in Whittier, California. Silva and his son, who allegedly were not wearing seatbelts, were both thrown from the vehicle. His son survived the crash with abrasions and bruising but no major injuries. Silva, however, flew 100 feet (30 m) before striking the pavement, and died instantly. He was 38 years old. His wife also survived with minimal injury. Douglas Robert Owens pleaded guilty to vehicular manslaughter, drunken driving, and hit-and-run charges. Owens was sentenced to 10 years in state prison, which was the maximum allowed under the law.

Silva's death occurred during production of the 1989 "Weird Al" Yankovic film UHF. Parts of the film had to be rewritten since he had not finished filming his scenes. The film was dedicated to his memory. Yankovic would later reveal on his Ask Al website that the circumstances of Silva's death had contributed to his refusal to do advertisements for alcohol.

He is buried at the San Fernando Mission Cemetery in Mission Hills, Los Angeles, California.

== Filmography ==
=== Film ===
Year	Title	Role	Notes
1977	Alambrista!	Joe	
1979	Walk Proud	Dagger	
1979	The Jerk	Punk ("Mr. Nussbaum")	
1982	National Lampoon's Movie Madness	Carlos - 'Growing Yourself'	
1983	Second Thoughts	Latino #1	
1983	El Norte	Monte	
1984	Crackers	Ramon	
1987	Jocks	Chito	
1988	The Milagro Beanfield War	Milagro townsperson	
1988	The Night Before	Tito	
1988	Colors	Leo "Frog" Lopez	
1989	UHF	Raul Hernandez	Final film role; Dedicated to his memory

=== Television ===
Year	Title	Role	Notes
1977	Baretta	Harold	1 episode
1977	Police Story	Chicano #3	1 episode
1977	Visions	Domingo	1 episode
1979	Visions	Joe	1 episode
1979	The White Shadow	Julio	1 episode
1981	Lou Grant	Venice Knights gangleader	1 episode
1981–1987	Hill Street Blues	Jesus Martinez	guest star; 28 episodes
1981	Barney Miller	Puente	1 episode
1982	T. J. Hooker	Ramon Cruz	1 episode
1984	Maximum Security	Puck	pilot only
1986	Stir Crazy	Juan	1 episode
1986	Hunter	Hector Rivas	1 episode
1988	Stones for Ibarra	Basilio Garcia	TV movie
1988	Home Free	Eddie Fuentes	TV movie
