= Talent for the Game =

1991 film by Robert M. Young

- Home video release poster
- Directed by: Robert M. Young
- Written by: David Himmelstein; Thomas Michael Donnelly; Larry Ferguson
- Produced by: Martin Elfand
- Starring: Edward James Olmos; Lorraine Bracco
- Cinematography: Curtis Clark
- Edited by: Arthur Coburn
- Music by: David Newman
- Distributed by: Paramount Pictures
- Release date: April 26, 1991
- Running time: 91 minutes
- Country: United States
- Language: English
- Box office: $336,396

Talent for the Game is a 1991 film directed by Robert M. Young and starring Edward James Olmos, Lorraine Bracco, Terry Kinney, Jamey Sheridan, and Jeff Corbett. The plot concerns a baseball scout.

Scenes were filmed on the Palouse in the small town of Genesee, Idaho, between Lewiston and Moscow, and nearby Garfield, Washington. Other scenes were shot in northern Idaho at Kellogg.

After a disappointing debut in a limited number of theaters in Florida, it went quickly to video.

== Plot ==
Virgil Sweet is a veteran baseball scout for the California Angels. He is in danger of losing his life's work because the Angels' new owner, Gil Lawrence, is unhappy with the farm system and threatening to eliminate the team's scouts.

Virgil hasn't discovered a great young prospect for quite a while. One day, when the car that he and girlfriend Bobbie, who also is employed by the team, are driving breaks down on a rural road, Virgil happens upon a country boy named Sammy Bodeen who has a pitching arm worthy of the major leagues.

Greeted back in Anaheim with considerable skepticism, Virgil arranges a tryout for Sammy. The boy is wild at first and Virgil's great find appears to be a big joke. Once he calms down, however, Sammy proves to have everything it takes to make it big.

Team management, desperate for a new star, immediately begins to overplay the arrival of Sammy with wildly overblown hype. A public-relations blitz promotes the boy as baseball's next great star, even though he has yet to throw a pitch in a big-league game. By the time Sammy takes the mound for his first Angels game, expectations are so high that he cannot possibly live up to them.

He is roughed up by opponents in the first inning, humiliating the owner and making fans furious. But, gradually, with a surprise assist from Virgil on the field, Sammy settles down and begins to look like a star in the making.

== Cast ==
- Edward James Olmos as Virgil Sweet
- Lorraine Bracco as Bobbie
- John E. Coleman as Angels Coach
- Jeff Corbett as Sammy Bodeen
- Jamey Sheridan as Tim Weaver
- Terry Kinney as Gil Lawrence
- Thomas Ryan as Paul
- Felton Perry as Fred
- Tom Bower as Rev. Bodeen
- Janet Carroll as Rachel Bodeen
- Daniel A. Haro as Burns
- Murphy Sua as Dick Bortner
- David Riley as Toby Curry
- James Keane as Ray Coffey
- Zachary I. Young as Rudy Coffey
- Dennis Boutsikaris as Greg Rossi
- Leslie Bevis as Marla
- John Yajko as Riggs

== See also ==
- List of baseball films
