= Cowley Abbott Canadian Art Auctioneers =

Canadian art auction house

Cowley Abbott Canadian Art Auctioneers is a Toronto-based auction house specializing in Canadian historical, post-war and contemporary art. Founded in 2013 as Consignor Canadian Fine Art, it was renamed Cowley Abbott Canadian Art Auctioneers in 2019.

== History ==
In 2012, Ryan Mayberry launched consignor.ca. In 2013, Rob Cowley and Lydia Abbott joined as managing partners, and the business opened Consignor Canadian Fine Art at 326 Dundas Street West in Toronto.

Before the launch, Cowley had worked for more than a decade at a Toronto auction house, including five years as chief auctioneer. Abbott had previously worked at Waddington's and Heffel Auction, while Mayberry continued to work with Mayberry Fine Art in Winnipeg.

Consignor held its first sale online in September 2013. It saw positive growth within its first year, as in May 2014 it broke the record for a Canadian online auction, with Jack Bush's Summer Lake achieving a price of $310,000. On May 31, 2016, it held its first semi-annual live sale - a success, due in part to the discovery of a Lawren Harris oil sketch, Algoma (Algoma Sketch 48), in a private collection in Australia which achieved a price of $977,500.

It was rebranded as Cowley Abbott in 2019 with both online and live sales held semi-annually. In the fall of 2020, it presented what was called an online live presentation due to new provincial public health restrictions but by spring 2021, live auctions were normal again and its live platform was "well received" with good results "rolling out quickly".

The start of its private collection sales occurred in fall 2022. The private collection belonged to a couple called "brilliant" in hindsight, who started collecting in the early 1960s but preferred to remain anonymous for the sale. It included a range of pieces, from early historical works to the Group of Seven.

The first private collection auction broke 12 artist records. It had been expected to bring $8–$12 million at auction but Cowley Abbott's two session live auction event, which also included their live auction of important Canadian art in the afternoon, achieved a combined $19.6 million. The Cowley Abbott's two-session spring live auction event on June 8, grossed more than $16 million with An Important Private Collection of Canadian Art cumulatively achieved a gross total of over $27 million across the two auctions to date with a final installment coming in December 2023. It was on track "to become the highest-grossing private collection of Canadian art ever sold at auction" according to Art Daily and did indeed fetch $36.6M, the cumulative total in fall 2023, the three sales generating 29 broken records for Canadian artists.

Both parts of the 2023 sales attracted significant attention from the collecting audience. The catalogues, filled with detailed essays by Canada's art historians, were thought to be "treasures for any library". "Cowley Abbott devoted care, appreciation and devotion to these auctions", wrote Galleries West magazine in the spring of 2023 and this comment was confirmed in fall 2023 by the expertly curated catalogues prepared for the auctions.

== Notable sales ==
- November 2013: Tom Thomson Daydreaming painting sold for over $170,000 at Consignor Art Auction;
- November 2014: William Kurelek Ukrainian Proverb painting sold for $41,400 at Consignor Art Auction;
- May 2017: Maud Lewis Black Cats painting sold for $36,800 at Consignor Art Auction;
- June 2021: David Bowie DHead XLVI (1997) painting sold for $108,120;
- June 2023: Cowley Abbott is entrusted with the set of four colour screen prints of Queen Elizabeth II from Andy Warhol's Reigning Queens series by the Winnipeg Art Gallery which deaccessioned them; they were subsequently sold for $936,000.
- Fall 2022-Fall 2023: An Important Private Collection of Canadian Art fetches in total $36.6 million, the highest price for a Canadian private collection at auction.
- December 6, 2023: William Kurelek Kurelek's Streets Pier, Worthing, circa 1957, painting sold for $144,000.00;
- fall 2024: William Kurelek A Little Girl and Her Snowman (1973) painting sold for $216,000.00;
