= Cortile Cascino =

- Original title: Cortile Cascino
- Directed by: Robert M. Young; Michael Roemer
- Written by: Robert M. Young; Michael Roemer
- Distributed by: NBC-TV (cancelled)
- Release date: 1962 (unbroadcast)
- Running time: 45 minutes
- Country: United States (Note: Filmed in Italy.)
- Languages: English; Italian

Cortile Cascino is a 1962 (Note: Sources vary on the date, some report the date as 1961.) documentary filmed, written and directed by Robert M. Young and Michael Roemer. The documentary was produced for NBC White Paper, a television series that ran on NBC from 1960 to 1980. The film details the lives of inhabitants living in a Palermitano slum (Cortile Cascino), in Palermo, Italy. The main focus of the film is 23 year old Angela Capra and her family. After viewing footage of the film, NBC deemed it too extreme for American viewers and two days before it was scheduled to be broadcast, NBC abruptly cancelled it.

In 1987, Britain's public-service television Channel 4 indicated they wanted to broadcast the film, and asked Young to create a 10-minute update on the fate of Capra and her family. Young's son Andrew (Note: Andrew Young was 2 years old at the time of the original film, and had accompanied his father to Italy during the filming of the documentary)and his wife Susan Todd took an interest in the project and traveled back to Sicily, where they found Capra and her relatives still living in Palermo. Andrew and Todd instead made their own documentary, Children of Fate: Life and Death in a Sicilian Family, detailing what had transpired in Capra and her family's lives during the preceding 30 years.

== Background ==
Robert Young had been one of the main contributors to NBC White Paper during its first two seasons, making three documentaries for the series. For Cortile Cascino, Young asked Roemer, an accomplished filmmaker, to collaborate with him on the project. Upon arrival in Palermo, Young wanted to immerse himself in the lives of the inhabitants residing in the slum area, while Roemer was hesitant to live without running water and sanitary conditions. The pair decided they would film the production in cinéma vérité, filming first and arranging the footage later. They conducted interviews of the residents first, making English voice-over dialogue for the interviews, while the remainder of the filming was conducted after the structure was written, with two editors cutting the footage daily.

The main character in the film, 23 year old Angela Capra, is shown feeding her children on stale and stolen pasta, while frequently enduring beatings from her alcoholic and unemployed husband. Capra relays to the filmmakers how one of her daughters came down with a fever, refused to eat and died of malnutrition. Capra is also shown giving birth to her fourth child with assistance from her female friends. The rest of the documentary is split into different sections examining the lives of the occupants. Scenes in the film show the different jobs the residents hold, with men and boys digging through the city dump, weaving rope from human hair clippings collected off barber shop floors, children sorting rags, collecting metals and polishing furniture. Additionally, the film depicts residents employed by the various enterprises the Sicilian Mafia control, gambling, prostitution, illegal slaughter-houses and meat markets. The Mafia also controls concessions for funerals, showing gravediggers removing previously buried remains, making room for new ones. The documentary ends with a reversal of the beginning of the film, showing the two filmmakers leaving the slum riding out on the train.

== Cancellation by NBC ==
Cortile Cascino was originally scheduled to be broadcast on May 18, 1962 on White Paper, but a few days before the airing, NBC abruptly cancelled the premiere. In addition to the graphic images of poverty and despair portrayed in the slum, Irving Gitlin, producer of White Paper, also objected to "chronological manipulations" in the film. Gitlin complained that a wedding showed another couple, instead of the actual couple, they ended the film with the death of Capra's daughter, and had also staged the birth of Capra's fourth child because they were leaving Italy and she hadn't given birth yet. Young wanted to add a disclaimer to the film, but NBC insisted he change it instead. When Young refused, he was fired, and the film was "vaulted" and never aired.

However, Young and Roemer both argued that the liberties they took "captured the truth about life" in the slum more accurately than following the actual chronological timeline of the events. In an interview with the author of Robert M. Young: Essays on the Films, Young speculated that "Gitlin's complaints were motivated by political reasons". Young said the Kennedy administration was supporting the Democratic Italian government, to prevent Italy from becoming a communist society, and the administration's endeavor would have been threatened by the portrayal of such intense poverty depicted in the film. Roemer said the real reason was because of an "intense personal animosity" between Young and Gitlin.

== Epilogue ==
The 1993 documentary by Andrew Young and his wife Susan Todd find Angela Capra, now 53 years old, divorced from her abusive husband, and living nearby in an apartment and supporting herself as a cleaning woman. Her children still live near her, with one son spending time in prison. The documentary is interspersed with scenes from the earlier film, and won the prize for Excellence in Cinematography Award Documentary at the Sundance Film Festival in 1993, and was nominated for an Academy Award for Best Documentary Feature. The documentary was also the first time that footage from the original film was shown.

== See also ==
- Robert M. Young Filmography
- Extreme poverty
- Organized crime in Italy
