= William Kurelek's The Maze =

- Theatrical release poster
- Directed by: Robert M. Young; David Grubin
- Produced by: Stanley Plotnick; Irwin Young (executive producers); Nick Young; Zack Young
- Starring: William Kurelek
- Cinematography: Robert M. Young
- Edited by: David Grubin; Zack Young; Nick Young; Roger Cohen
- Music by: Nick Young; Zack Young
- Production company: MachinEyes
- Release date: 1969
- Running time: 65 minutes
- Country: United States
- Language: English

William Kurelek's The Maze is a documentary film about the life of celebrated Canadian artist William Kurelek, "dramatically told through his paintings and his on-camera revelations." The film documents the artist's struggles with attempted suicide and what he called a "spiritual crisis." At the center of the film is Kurelek's work The Maze, which he describes in the film as "a painting of the inside of [his] skull which [he] painted while in England as a patient in Maudsley and Netherne psychiatric hospitals." This painting depicts a man's "unraveled head lying in a wheat field. A curled up laboratory rat, representing his spirit, is trapped inside a maze of unhappy thoughts and memories."

== Story ==
William Kurelek (1927-1977) was the son of Ukrainian immigrants to Canada. Although demonstrating artistic talent in his youth, William's ability was ridiculed by his father, who did not see the value of his interests. The self-doubt his father instilled in him brought on suicidal despair and institutionalization. He spent a year in a British mental hospital and didn't overcome his spiritual and emotional crisis until he converted to Roman Catholicism in 1957. Ultimately, Kurelek made a name for himself as a landscape painter and a highly regarded illustrator of children's books.

In the film, Kurelek reflects on his artistic development under the disapproving eyes of his father. Many paintings besides The Maze are featured in the film, accompanied by the insights of Kurelek and others, including three psychiatrists and a priest. Members of Kurelek's family are also interviewed, including his wife, sister, mother, and father, "who begrudgingly admits pride in his son's success, though he would still have preferred a more masculine and lucrative occupation for William."

== Production ==
=== Primary version ===
In 1969, director Robert M. Young was asked to make a film about psychotic art by Cornell University professor James Maas. When Young saw Kurelek's painting The Maze in Maas' slide collection, he knew he had to make a film about the man who painted it. "What was so remarkable about this painting to me," says Young, "was that I felt I was looking into someone's mind. It had in it his sexuality, his fears, his questions about whether he was really even human... a self awareness and understanding that he was being observed by doctors and [a curiosity] as to whether or not he was mental... It's a painting that really encompasses very much in a person's life."

Partnered with filmmaker David Grubin, Robert M. Young traveled to London to document the hospitals where Kurelek had stayed, and the doctors who treated him. Eventually he made his way to Canada, to interview Kurelek himself, and his family. A short version of the film, titled The Maze: The Story of William Kurelek, was finished in 1969 for educational classes, to help demonstrate the strong relationship between art and psychology. In 1972, the American Film Festival named this version outstanding educational documentary of the year, and it went on to be studied and used in classrooms.

A longer and more complex version of the film was worked on in the editing room but was never completed and became lost.

=== Resurrection ===
Over 40 years later, the longer version was recovered and brought to life by Robert M. Young's sons, Nick Young and Zack Young, through their company MachinEyes. They have expanded the film by editing in the lost footage (much of it following Kurelek's father, Dmytro), adding an original score, and using modern visual effects to animate the characters and figures of the painting. "We feel that the longer version of the film that the public has yet to see gives a much deeper insight into Kurelek's story," says Nick. "We've been able to track down just about all of the paintings in the original film as well as others and have rephotographed them with equipment that was not available to our father when he made the original film. There is so much detail and hidden meaning in these paintings and WIlliam Kurelek's story becomes all the more compelling when one experiences in High Definition what a masterful artist he was."

=== Composing a score ===
Brothers Nick and Zack Young also comprise the Los Angeles-based rock band A.i. (once signed to DreamWorks and now independent – aimusic.com). Nick and Zack researched what music Kurelek listened to while painting to help develop an authentic score. "We explored traditional Ukrainian folk music and Ukrainian instruments, as well as Beethoven," says Zack Young, "This music organically melded with Kurelek's aesthetic and helped blur the lines between the old interview footage and the new high res paintings… between reality and what Kurelek called 'unreality.' We also wrote an A.i. song for the end credits titled "Someone With Me," which is named after Kurelek's autobiography."

== Reception ==
The film has been screened across Canada and in part of the U.S. receiving overall positive reviews. Writer Kate Taylor of The Globe and Mail wrote of the film, "A 1969 doc about the Canadian painter's relationship with madness has been remade for a new generation." James McNally of Toronto Screen Shots wrote, "The longer film really dazzles, with more focus on the individual paintings, and the use of animation really evokes the powerful emotions that must have gone into their creation." One critic from theartmarket.ca even went so far as to claim "william kurelek's the maze is the best film i have ever seen on canadian art." Peter Goddard of the Toronto Star claimed the film "does little to demystify the life of the late Canadian painter" but still admitted the film "gives us a far better understanding of at least one figure Kurelek depicted in his famously enigmatic 1953 painting: his father" and said the animations of the paintings were executed "to surprisingly good effect."

William Kurelek' The Maze had its world premiere at the 2011 Mill Valley Film Festival in California. It was also accepted into the Starz Denver Film Festival in the same year. The film also accompanied the traveling exhibition William Kurelek: The Messenger across Canada, screening at the Winnipeg Art Gallery, the Art Gallery of Hamilton, and the Art Gallery of Greater Victoria. On October 19, 2012 the film had its Toronto premiere at St. Anne's Church, presented by Workman Arts and the Rendezvous with Madness Film Festival, and Rendezvous screened it again at their festival the following month.

== Out of the Maze ==
In the process of hunting down Kurelek's paintings to rephotograph them, the Young brothers met and decided to interview on camera his family members, art dealer, and assistants. One of the family members interviewed was William's youngest brother Paul, shown on a farm he bought that is adjacent to his father's farm (which is featured in William Kurelek's The Maze). Eventually the Youngs decided to use this material for a film currently in production, Out of the Maze, featuring never-before-seen Kurelek paintings and offering "personal insights into [his] life and art." The film's title is inspired by the 1971 Kurelek painting Out of the Maze, a sequel to The Maze, which William presented to Maudsley Hospital as a gift. At the center of the work is a family - representing Kurelek himself, his wife, and his four kids - enjoying a picnic on the sunlit prairie. However, the scene is not altogether idyllic: in the bottom left corner lies a bisected skull, reminding the viewer of the "maze" prison of the artist's past. And in the far upper right a dark storm is on horizon, signaling impending disaster.

This film will be a bonus feature released in conjunction with William Kurelek's The Maze.
