= Louise Noguchi =

Canadian artist (born 1958)

- Born: Louise Mitsuko Noguchi; 1958 (age 67–68); Toronto, Ontario, Canada
- Education: MFA, University of Windsor; AOCA from Ontario College of Art, Toronto
- Website: www.louisenoguchi.com

Louise Noguchi (born 1958) is a multidisciplinary visual artist in Toronto who for five decades has used video, photography, sculpture, and installation to examine notions of identity, perception and reality.

== Early career ==
Louise Noguchi was born in Toronto, and received her MFA from the University of Windsor and AOCA from the Ontario College of Art in Toronto. She has been active in the Toronto art community since 1981.

== Work ==
Her sculptural installation work in the 1980s dealt with the theme of the hunter. In 1999, she co-authored Compilation Portraits - Louise Noguchi with Kym Pruesse and Suzanne Luke (Robert Langen Gallery). In the 1990s, she explored the language of violence which is concealed in the Wild West mythology of rodeo cowboys, trick roping, sharp shooting, gun spinning and knife throwing. In her video Crack (2000), for instance, a cowboy's bull whip beheads a white flower, with one crack. (Crack and her other videos have been shown at the Art Gallery of Ontario).

More recently, she has looked to contemporary culture as a source for material, including her background as a Japanese descendant. In a series in 2013, Noguchi has taken archival digital prints of the Royal Ontario Museum's collection of Buddha heads that were broken or sawed off by thieves and vandals, but had been part of rock walls at various religious sites in China. In the following years, she examined Japanese Canadian history, as in 2025, when she did The Shape of Loss, a co-created, live installation during the all-night Nuit Blanche festival at the Japanese Canadian Cultural Centre Gallery, Toronto. Part of it as well as a time-lapse video of her performance remained in the gallery until the show closed in 2026.

== Selected exhibitions ==
Her work has been included in solo and group exhibitions across Canada and internationally. She has had solo exhibitions starting at Carmen Lamanna Gallery in Toronto (1982), and other shows such as Louise Noguchi: Selected Work 1982-85 were held at the Power Plant, Toronto (1989), at Oakville Galleries, and the Agnes Etherington Art Centre, Kingston (1999); at Birch Contemporary Gallery, Toronto (2005); and at Centre A: Vancouver International Centre for Contemporary Asian Art and the Thames Art Gallery (2008).

In 2024, the two-person show Louise Lawler Louise Noguchi was shown at the Beauty Supply Room in Toronto, curated by Kate Whiteway. In 2024 as well, the exhibition Louise Noguchi: Selected Works 1986-2000 opened at the Art Gallery of Ontario. It included three works from her career: Crack, a video showing flowers demolished by a whip; Fruits of Belief: The Grand Landscape, an installation that merged sculpture and photography; and Eden, a sculpture made using a mirror. In 2025, her exhibition The Shape of Loss was shown at the Japanese Canadian Cultural Centre Gallery in Toronto.

She has participated in group shows since 1978 and been in exhibitions at the Contemporary Art Gallery and the Canadian Embassy Gallery, Vancouver (1996); the Canadian Embassy in Tokyo, Japan (1996); Oakville Galleries, and the Canadian Museum of Contemporary Photography, Ottawa (1997–1999); Deutsches Museum, Munich (2002); the Art Gallery of Ontario, Toronto (2002 and 2016) (the Art Gallery of Ontario received a large-scale installation from the Canada Council Art Bank in the late 1990s and also put it on exhibition in 2005), with Stan Douglas in the Space of Making, Berlin (2005), and in the United States (2009). In 2020, she was in a group show titled Next Year's Country, linked with artists as seemingly distant as William Kurelek at Remai Modern, Saskatoon.

== Selected solo exhibitions prior to 2000 ==
- Carmen Lamanna Gallery (1982), Toronto, Canada.
- ’’Extensions of the Heart’’ (1984), Carmen Lamanna Gallery, Toronto, Canada;
- ’’We Draw to Kill the Beasts’’ (1985), Carmen Lamanna Gallery, Toronto, Canada;
- Carmen Lamanna Gallery (1986), Toronto, Canada;
- Carmen Lamanna Gallery (1987), Toronto, Canada;
- ’’Out of the Garden...Into the Forest’’ (1989), Carmen Lamanna Gallery, Toronto, Canada;
- ’’Louise Noguchi: Selected Work 1982-1985’’' (1989), The Power Plant Gallery, Toronto, Canada;
- Southern Albert Art Gallery (1990), Lethbridge, Canada;
- Stride Gallery, Calgary (1990);
- Forest City, London (1992);
- Optica, Montréal (1993);
- Cold City, Toronto (1993);
- L.A. (Industrial Arts) (1993);
- Compilation Portraits, Cold City Gallery, Toronto (1995);
- CEPA Underground (1997) (inaugural exhibition), Buffalo, USA
- Modus Operandi (2 person exhibition with Ginette Legaré) (1999).

== Selected group exhibitions ==
- Photoworks Gallery (1978), Toronto;
- The Viewing Rooms (1979), New York, New York;
- The Funnel (film screening) (1980), Toronto;
- Artventure (1980), Royal Bank Plaza, Toronto;
- Gallery 76 (1981), Toronto;
- First Purchase (1981), The Art Gallery at Harbourfront, Toronto;
- Carmen Lamanna Gallery (1981), Toronto;
- Women in Art (1982), Art Rental, Art Gallery of Ontario, Toronto;
- Attitude (1983), Canada National Exhibition, Toronto;
- The New City of Sculpture (1984), Studio 620, Toronto;
- Territories (1985), Eye Level Gallery, Halifax, Nova Scotia;
- Art Cologne (1986), Rheinhallen of the Cologne Art Fair, Cologne, West Germany;
- Patio Lawn Slope (1986), University of Toronto, Scarborough Campus, Toronto;
- Mapping the Surface (1986), Mendel Art Gallery, Saskatoon, Saskatchewan;
- How We See (1986) - What We Say, The Art Gallery at Harbourfront, Toronto, Canada;
- Shikata Ga Nai (1987), Hamilton Artist Inc., Hamilton, Ontario (touring);
- Drawing Out the Form: Sculpture Touched by Drawing (1987), The Nickle Art Museum, University of Calgary, Calgary, Alberta;
- The Today Show (1988), The Japanese Cultural Centre, Toronto;
- Textiles, That is to Say (1994), Museum for Textiles, Toronto, Or Gallery, Vancouver;
- For Lack of Evidence (1996), Chateau de La Roche-Guyon, France;
- Rococo Tattoo (1997), Power Plant Gallery, Toronto;
- (Travelling Exhibition) Track Records: Trains and Contemporary Photography (1997–1999), Oakville Galleries, Oakville; Canadian Museum of Contemporary Photography, Ottawa; Presentation House and Contemporary Art Gallery, Vancouver; The Illingworth Kerr Gallery, Calgary; Centre culturel Université de Sherbrooke; MacKenzie Art Gallery, Regina; Winnipeg Art Gallery, Winnipeg;
- La Face/The Face (1999) - Daizbao, Montreal;
- Crime and Punishment (1999), Agnes Etherington Art Centre, Kingston;
- Louise Noguchi & June Pak: somewhere between (2012), Centre 3, Hamilton, ON;
- Tributes and Tributaries 1971-1989 (2016–2017), Art Gallery of Ontario, Toronto, ON;
- Next Year's Country (2020), rRemai Modern, Saskatoon, SK;
- The Return (2023), Ace Hotel Toronto, Toronto, ON;
- Louise Lawler, Louise Noguchi: Beauty Supply Room (2023), Beauty Supply, Toronto, ON;

== Public collections ==
Noguchi's work is in the public collection of the Art Gallery of Ontario, Oakville Galleries; the Agnes Etherington Art Centre, Kingston; the Robert McLaughlin Gallery, Oshawa; and elsewhere. She is represented by Birch Contemporary Gallery in Toronto.

== Teaching ==
She was a professor in the Art and Art History Program, a collaborative joint program between the University of Toronto Mississauga and Sheridan College where she taught photography and performance-based art from 1971 on.
