= Robert M. Young (director) =

American film director and producer (1924–2024)

- Born: Robert Milton Young; November 22, 1924; New York City, U.S.
- Died: February 6, 2024 (aged 99); Los Angeles, California, U.S.
- Other name: Robert M. Young
- Education: Harvard University (B.A., 1949)
- Occupations: Director; screenwriter; producer; cinematographer

Robert Milton Young (November 22, 1924 – February 6, 2024) was an American film and television director, cinematographer, screenwriter, and producer. Young was considered a trailblazer in the independent filmmaking sector and for frequently casting Edward James Olmos in his movies, directing him in Alambrista! (1977), The Ballad of Gregorio Cortez (1982), Saving Grace (1986), Triumph of the Spirit (1989), Talent for the Game (1991), Roosters (1993), Slave of Dreams (1995), and Caught (1996). He produced Olmos's directorial debut, American Me (1992).

== Early life and education ==
Robert Milton Young was born in New York City on November 22, 1924. His father was a cameraman who later owned a film laboratory. Robert began college at MIT to become a chemical engineer. He left after two years to join the U.S. Navy during World War II and served in the Pacific in New Guinea and in the Philippines. Upon returning to America after the war, he decided to study English literature at Harvard University.

Young also developed an interest in filmmaking and graduated from Harvard in 1949.

== Career ==
After graduation, Young formed a cooperative partnership with two friends making educational films. In 1960, he worked for NBC making public affairs programs for NBC White Paper. In 1960, on behalf of NBC, he went to the American South to make the film Sit-In about the civil rights protests and sit-ins. The film won a Peabody Award.

Young later left NBC to pursue narrative film work.

Young won a Guggenheim Fellowship in 1975.

In 1985 he was a member of the jury at the 14th Moscow International Film Festival.

== Death ==
Young died in Los Angeles on February 6, 2024, at the age of 99.

== Filmography ==
=== Filmmaking credits ===
==== Feature films ====
Title	Year	Director	Producer	Writer	Notes
Nothing But a Man	1964	No	Yes	Yes	
The Plot Against Harry	1971	No	Yes	No	
Short Eyes	1977	Yes	Yes	No	Directorial Debut
Alambrista!	1977	Yes	No	Yes	
Rich Kids	1979	Yes	No	No	
One-Trick Pony	1980	Yes	No	No	
The Ballad of Gregorio Cortez	1982	Yes	No	Yes	
Saving Grace	1986	Yes	No	No	
Extremities	1986	Yes	No	No	
Dominick and Eugene	1988	Yes	No	No	
Triumph of the Spirit	1989	Yes	No	No	
Talent for the Game	1991	Yes	No	No	
American Me	1992	No	Yes	No	
Caught	1996	Yes	No	No	
China: The Panda Adventure	2001	Yes	No	No	IMAX film
Human Error	2004	Yes	No	No	

==== Documentaries ====
Title	Year	Director	Writer	Notes
Secrets of the Reef	1956	Yes	Yes	
At the Winter Sea Ice Camp: Part 4	1967	Yes	No	Short film
The Eskimo: Fight for Life	1970	Yes	Yes	
Children of the Fields	1973	Yes	No	Short film
To Fly!	1976	No	Yes	IMAX short film
Children of Fate: Life and Death in a Sicilian Family	1993	Yes	No	
William Kurelek's The Maze	2011	Yes	No	Co-directed with David Grubin

Cancelled film: Cortile Cascino (1962)

==== Television ====
Title	Year	Director	Producer	Writer	Notes
World Wide '60	1960	Yes	No	No	Television series (episode "The Living End")
Sit-In	1960	Yes	No	No	Episode of TV series 'NBC White Paper'
Angola: Journey to a War	1961	Yes	No	No	Episode of TV series 'NBC White Paper')
J.T.	1969	Yes	No	No	Television film
National Geographic Specials	1972–1976	Yes	No	No	Television documentary series (4 episodes)
Amanda Fallon	1973	No	No	Creator	Unsold pilot
Special Treat	1978	Yes	No	No	Television series (episode "Snowbound")
We Are the Children	1987	Yes	No	No	Television film
Solomon & Sheba	1995	Yes	No	No	Television film
Slave of Dreams	1995	Yes	No	No	Television film
Caught	1996	Yes	No	No	Television film
Nothing Sacred	1997–1998	Yes	No	No	Television series (2 episodes)
Battlestar Galactica	2004–2009	Yes	No	No	Television series (5 episodes)
Walkout	2006	No	Co-Executive	No	Television film

=== Technical credits ===
==== Feature films ====
Title	Year	Cinematographer	Camera operator
Nothing But a Man	1964	Yes	
Namu, the Killer Whale	1966		Yes
Alambrista!	1977	Yes	
The Plot Against Harry	1989	Yes	
American Me	1992		Yes
Berkeley	2005		Yes

==== Documentaries and other ====
Title	Year	Cinematographer	Sound	Editor	Notes
Secrets of the Reef	1956	Yes			
Stalking Seal on the Spring Ice	1967	Yes			Short series in 2 films
Jigging for Lake Trout	1967	Yes			
Group Hunting on the Spring Ice	1967	Yes			Short series in 3 films
Fishing at the Stone Weir	1967	Yes			Short series in 2 films
Building a Kayak	1967	Yes			Short series in 2 films
At the Winter Sea Ice Camp	1967	Yes			Short series in 4 films
At the Spring Sea Ice Camp	1967	Yes			Short series in 3 films
At the Caribou Crossing Place	1967	Yes			Short series in 2 films
At the Autumn River Camp	1967	Yes			Short series (only part 2)
The Eskimo: Fight for Life	1970	Yes			
Deal	1977	Yes			
Out on a Limb: An Introduction to Jack Hodgins	1981		Yes		Short film
Imperfect Union: Canadian Labour and the Left, Part 2: Born of Hard Times	1989		Yes		
Children of Fate: Life and Death in a Sicilian Family	1993	Yes		Yes	
The Last Winter	2002			Yes	Short film
William Kurelek's The Maze	2011	Yes			

==== Television ====
Title	Year	Cinematographer	Second unit director	Notes
High Adventure with Lowell Thomas	1957		Yes	Television documentary series
National Geographic Specials	1972–1976	Yes		Television documentary series (4 episodes)
Special Treat	1978	Yes		Television series (episode "Snowbound")
Walkout	2006		Yes	Television film
