= Mahoney =

Mahoney is an Irish surname originally designating the descendants of Mathghamhain.

== Notable people ==
- Alexander Mahoney (1947– ), New Zealand cricketer
- Ann Mahoney (1976– ), American television, film, and stage actress
- Anne Rankin Mahoney (1937–2025), American sociologist
- Atholstan Mahoney (1908–1979), New Zealand rugby union player
- Balls Mahoney (1972–2016), American professional wrestler
- Bernard Joseph Mahoney (1875–1939), Roman Catholic Bishop of Sioux Falls
- Bob Mahoney (baseball) (1928–2000), American Major League Baseball pitcher
- Brian Mahoney (disambiguation), multiple people
- Bryan Mahoney (disambiguation), multiple people
- Caitlin Mahoney (1990– ), American female volleyball player
- Carolyn Mahoney (1946– ), American mathematician
- Charles Mahoney (disambiguation), multiple people
- Chris Mahoney (disambiguation), multiple people named Chris or Christopher
- Connor Mahoney (1997– ), English professional footballer
- Cynthia L. Mahoney (1951–2006), American nun
- Dan Mahoney (disambiguation), multiple people
- Daniel Mahoney (disambiguation), multiple people
- Dave Mahoney (1892–1947), Australian rules footballer
- David Mahoney (1981– ), American soccer goalkeeper
- David Mahoney (1987– ), British producer and performer
- David J. Mahoney (1923–2000), American business leader, philanthropist and author
- Dej Mahoney (living), British legal and business consultant
- Dennis Mahony (1821–1879), American newspaper editor
- Denzel Mahoney (1998– ), American professional basketball player
- Edward Joseph Mahoney (1949–2019), American singer, songwriter and multi-instrumentalist
- Eugene T. Mahoney (1928–2004), American politician
- Florence Mahoney (1929– ), Gambian Creole author
- Francis Mahoney (disambiguation), multiple people
- Frank Mahoney (disambiguation), multiple people
- George Mahoney (1865– ), American Medal of Honor recipient
- George E. Mahoney (1867–1955), Wisconsin politician
- George P. Mahoney (1901–1989), Irish American Catholic building contractor and Democratic Party politician
- Gerald Mahoney (1892–1955), Australian politician
- Ike Mahoney (1901–1961), American football player
- Jack Mahoney (disambiguation), multiple people
- James E. Mahoney (1858–1926), American officer
- James Patrick Mahoney (1927–1995), Canadian Catholic bishop
- James Patrick Mahoney (New York bishop) (1925–2002), American Catholic bishop
- Janet Mahoney, English actress
- Janet Claire Mahoney, (1953– ), Australian actress
- Jaylen Mahoney (2000– ), American football player
- Jeremiah Mahoney (Medal of Honor) (1840–1902), American Medal of Honor recipient
- Jeremiah T. Mahoney (1878–1970), American lawyer and judge
- Jerry Mahoney (disambiguation), multiple people
- Jessie Callahan Mahoney (1887–1956)
- Jim Mahoney (1934– ), American former Major League Baseball player
- Jim Mahoney (umpire) (1931–2004), Australian football goal umpire
- Joan Mahoney (1943– ), American legal scholar
- Joanie Mahoney (1965– ), American politician
- Jock Mahoney (1919–1989), American actor
- Joe Mahoney (1987– ), professional baseball first baseman
- John Mahoney (disambiguation), multiple people
- Joseph Mahoney, Welsh professional rugby league footballer
- Josh Mahoney (1977– ), professional Australian rules footballer
- Julie Mahoney (1978– ), Canadian fencer
- Kevin Mahoney (1965–2011), American singer
- Liam Mahoney (1987– ), professional Canadian football wide receiver
- Louis Mahoney (1938–2020), Gambian-born British actor
- Lynn Mahoney (1964– ), American university president
- Maggie Mahoney (1922–2011), American film actress
- Margaret A. Mahoney, American politician
- Marie Mahoney (1924–2016), American professional baseball player
- Mark Mahoney (1957– ), American tattoo artist
- Mary Mahoney (1940–2021), Australian medical practitioner
- Mary Eliza Mahoney (1845–1926), African-American nurse
- Matthew Mahoney (disambiguation), multiple people
- Maureen Mahoney (1954– ), American lawyer
- Megan Mahoney (1983– ), American professional basketball player
- Merchant M. Mahoney (?–1946), Canadian diplomat
- Michael Mahoney (disambiguation), several people named Michael or Mike
- Murphy Mahoney (2001–), English professional footballer
- Neale Mahoney (1982–), American economist
- Neil Mahoney (1906–1973), American professional baseball scout
- Patrick Mahoney (1827–1857), Irish soldier
- Pat Mahoney (1929–2012), Canadian judge, politician, lawyer and businessman
- Paul Mahoney (disambiguation), multiple people
- Peter P. Mahoney (1848–1889), U.S. Representative from New York
- Rebecca Mahoney, (1983– ), New Zealand rugby union player
- Reed Mahoney (1998– ), Australian rugby league player
- Richard Mahoney (disambiguation), multiple people
- Robert Mahoney (1921–2017), American politician
- Rosemary Mahoney (1961– ), American non-fiction writer
- Simon Mahoney, British author
- Stephen Mahoney (1890–1974), American football player and coach
- Steve Mahoney (1947– ), Canadian politician
- Suzanne Somers (née Mahoney) (1946– ), American actor
- Thomas Mahoney (disambiguation), multiple people
- Tim Mahoney (disambiguation), several people named Tim or Timothy
- Tony Mahoney (1893–1924), American baseball player
- Tony Mahoney (1959– ), English professional football striker
- Travis Mahoney (1990– ), Australian medley and backstroke swimmer
- Ule Mahoney (1917–?), Panamanian baseball player
- Victoria Mahoney, American filmmaker and actress
- Walter J. Mahoney (1908–1982), New York politician
- Will Mahoney (1894-1967), American-born vaudevillian performer and stage actor
- William Mahoney (disambiguation), several people
- Willis Mahoney (1895–1968), American politician

== Fictional characters ==
- Breathless Mahoney of Dick Tracy
- Carey Mahoney of the Police Academy franchise
- Mrs. Mahoney of Kim Possible
- Denise Mahoney of Scrubs

== See also ==
- Mahony
- O'Mahony
- Beck-Mahoney Sorceress, racing staggerwing biplane
- Bruce-Mahoney Trophy, Californian inter-school sports trophy
- Eugene T. Mahoney State Park, near Ashland, Nebraska
- Lescher & Mahoney, American architectural firm
- Mahoney tables, set of reference tables used in architecture
- Segal McCambridge Singer & Mahoney, U.S.-based law firm
- Warren and Mahoney, New Zealand multi-disciplinary architectural practice
- W. P. Mahoney House in Kingman, Arizona
