= O'Mahony =

- O'Mahony arms
- Parent house: Eóganachta
- Country: Kingdom of Desmond
- Founder: Mathgamain mac Cian
- Final ruler: The 20th Duke O'Mahony (circa 1740-1790)
- Titles: King of Munster; Prince of Rathlin; The King of Glanmire; The Duke O'Mahony; Lord of Iveagh; Lord of Kinalmeaky; Lord of Tubrid
- Dissolution: 1740-1790

O'Mahony (Irish: Ó Mathúna, traditionally: Ó Mathghamhna) is the original name of the clan, with breakaway clans also spelled O'Mahoney, or simply Mahony, Mahaney and Mahoney, without the prefix. Brodceann O'Mahony was the eldest of the four sons of Mathghamain, known as "The Four Descendants".

The O'Mahonys were Cenél nÁeda princes of the ancient Eóganacht Raithlind. They were also for a period kings of Munster and Desmond, and take their name from Mathghamhain, son of Cian, son of Máel Muad mac Brain, King of Munster from around 960 to 970, and then again from 976 to 978. From 970 to 976 he was king of Desmond. His son Cian became a close ally of Brian Bóruma and married his daughter Sadb. From this marriage descend the O'Mahonys. Their Dukedom of O'Mahony came to an end in 1740.

== List of people ==
- Bernard O'Mahoney, crime author
- Dave Allen (comedian), Real name David Tynan O'Mahony. Famous Irish-English comedian.
- Bertha Mahony, children's literature specialist
- Charles Mahoney (disambiguation)
- Conor O'Mahony (priest), Irish Jesuit priest
- Cynthia L. Mahoney, Episcopalian nun and former chaplain in New York City, present at "Ground Zero" following the terrorist attacks of September 11, 2001
- Dan Mahoney (baseball), baseball player
- Dan Mahoney (journalist), Irish-American journalist investigated for possible Communist activities
- Dan Mahoney (politician), Australian politician
- Daniel O'Mahony, author
- Darragh O'Mahony, rugby player
- Dennis Mahony, newspaper founder
- Dermot O'Mahony, Irish politician and farmer
- Doireann O'Mahony, Irish barrister
- Duncan O'Mahony, Canadian football player
- Eugene O'Mahony, Irish museum curator and entomologist
- Flor O'Mahony, Irish politician
- Francis Sylvester Mahony, Irish humorist
- Frank P. Mahony, Australian artist
- Frank Mahony, Australian public servant
- George P. Mahoney, Catholic politician from Maryland
- Gwen O'Mahony, Canadian politician
- J. Daniel Mahoney, U.S. judge and founder of the Conservative Party
- Jeremiah Mahoney (Medal of Honor), Medal of Honor recipient from the American Civil War
- Joan Mahoney, American law professor
- Jock Mahoney, American actor and stuntman
- John Mahoney (1940–2018), English-American actor
- John O'Mahony, scholar and founder of the Fenian Brotherhood
- John O'Mahony (Mayo politician)
- John Keefer Mahony, Canadian recipient of the Victoria Cross
- Joseph C. O'Mahoney, United States Senator from Wyoming
- Katharine A. O'Keeffe O'Mahoney (1855–1918), Irish-born American educator, lecturer, writer, editor
- Margaret O'Mahony, Irish civil engineer
- Margaret Murphy O'Mahony (born 1969), Irish politician
- Marion Mahony Griffin, American architect and artist
- Maureen Mahoney, appellate lawyer
- Patricia Mahoney, American diplomat
- Patrick Mahoney, Irish recipient of the Victoria Cross
- Pat Mahoney, PC, Canadian judge, politician, lawyer and businessman
- Paul Mahoney (American lawyer), American law professor
- Paul Mahoney (English judge), British judge of the European Court of Human Rights
- Peter O'Mahony, rugby player
- Pierce Charles de Lacy O'Mahony, Irish Protestant Nationalist, philanthropist, politician and MP
- Roger Mahony, American Cardinal of the Roman Catholic Church
- Rosemary Mahoney, American writer of non-fiction narrative
- Seán O'Mahony, Irish politician
- Sean O'Mahony (Gaelic footballer) (born 1976), Gaelic footballer
- Sean O'Mahony (journalist) (1932–2020), British music writer and magazine editor
- Steve Mahoney, Canadian politician
- Suzanne Somers née Mahoney, U.S. actress
- Thomas O'Mahony, politician
- Walter J. Mahoney, American lawyer and politician
- William Mahony (disambiguation)
- William B. Mahoney, U.S. journalist and substance-abuse counselor

Places

- Dunlough Castle
- Mahoney Lake
- Mahoneys Corner, Nova Scotia
- Bishop James Mahoney High School
- Dunmanus Castle

Flying machines and equations

- Beck-Mahoney Sorceress
- Benjamin–Bona–Mahony equation
- Mahoney tables

== See also ==
- Mahoney
- Eóganachta
- Irish nobility
- Dromore Castle (disambiguation)

Other Munster families

- O'Donoghue
- O'Brien, Prince of Thomond
- O'Donovan
- McGillycuddy of the Reeks
- O'Grady of Kilballyowen
