= Mahony =

Mahony may refer to:

== Artists and entertainers ==
- Bertha Mahony (1882–1969), children's literature publisher
- Dennis Mahony (1821–1879), Irish-born American journalist and politician
- Eoghan Mahony, American television writer and producer
- Francis Sylvester Mahony (1804–1866), also known as Father Prout, Irish humorist
- Frank P. Mahony (1862–1916), Australian artist and member of the Dawn and Dusk Club
- Leo Halpin Mahony (born 1931), American architect
- Marion Mahony Griffin (1871–1961), American architect and artist

== Politicians ==
- Frank Mahony (public servant) (1915–2000), Australian public servant and Director-General of Security
- Philip Mahony (politician) (1897–1972), Irish politician
- Robert Mahony, politician

== Sportspeople ==
- Bill Mahony (William Victor Mahony, born 1949), Canadian Olympic swimmer
- Chris Mahony (born 1981) New Zealand rugby union player
- Harold Mahony (1867–1905), Irish tennis player
- Jerry Mahony (born 1956), British auto racing driver
- Junior Mahony (1897–1973), Irish hurler
- Pauric Mahony (born 1992), Irish hurler
- Philip Mahony (hurler) (born 1991), Irish hurler
- Tom Mahony, Irish hurler

== Others ==
- John Keefer Mahony (1911–1990), Canadian recipient of the Victoria Cross
- Roger Mahony (born 1936), American cardinal of the Roman Catholic Church
- William Mahony (disambiguation)

- William Mahony (politician, born 1877) (1877–1962), member of the Australian House of Representatives
- William Mahony (New South Wales politician) (1856–1918), member of the New South Wales Legislative Assembly
- William Mahony (bishop) (1919–1994), Bishop of the Roman Catholic Diocese of Ilorin

== See also ==
- Mahoney
- O'Mahony
