= Jerry Mahoney =

Jerry Mahoney may refer to:

- Jerry Mahoney (umpire) (1860–1947), Major League Baseball umpire
- Jerry Mahony (born 1956), racing driver
- Jerry O Mahoney, Irish Gaelic footballer
- The namesake of the Bruce–Mahoney Trophy
- A dummy used by ventriloquist Paul Winchell
