= Dunmanus Bay =

Inlet in County Cork, Ireland

Coordinates: 51°33′07″N 9°43′12″W

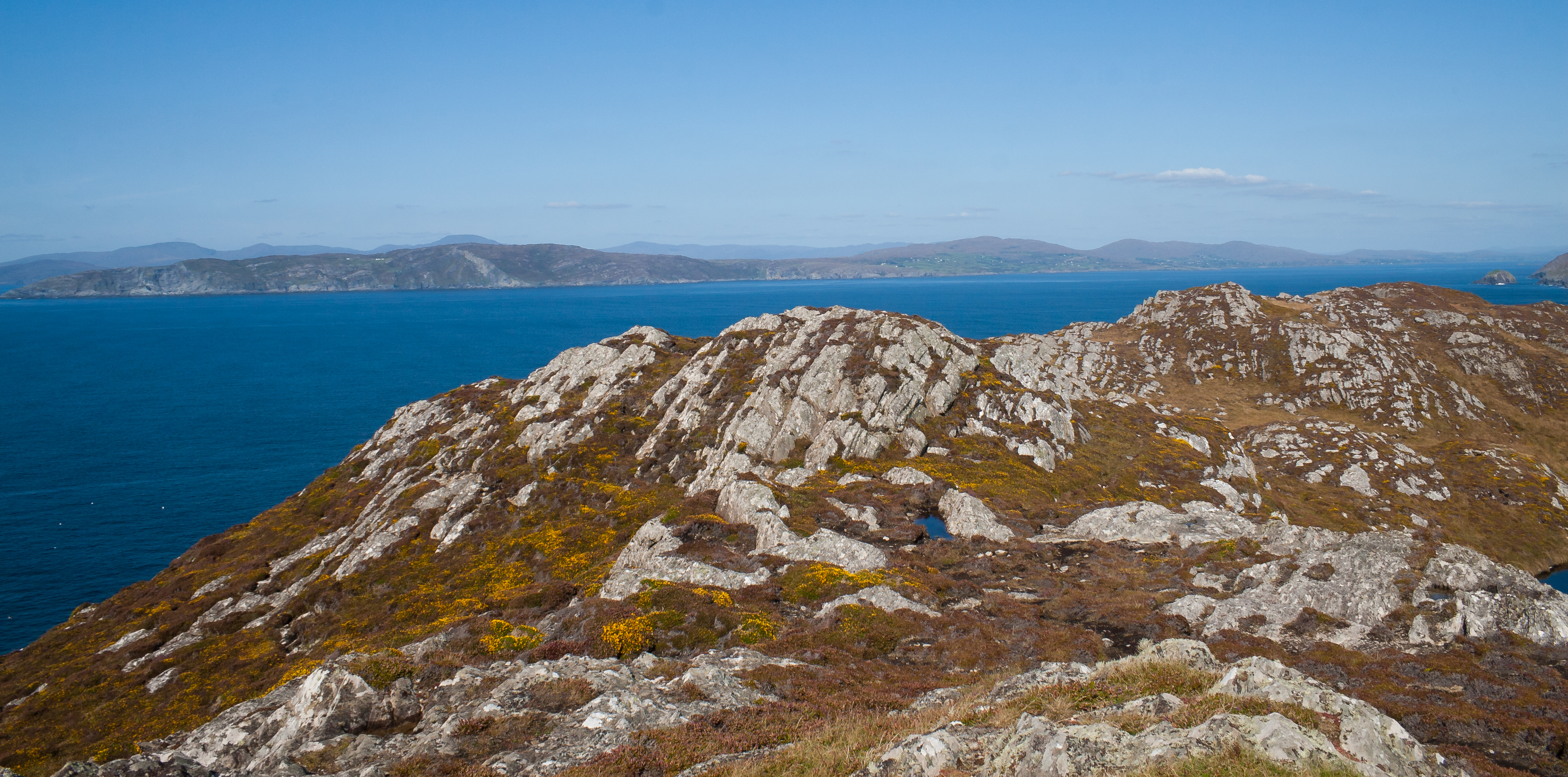
Dunmanus Bay as seen from Three Castle Head

Dunmanus Bay is a bay in County Cork, Ireland. The bay lies between Mizen Head to the south and Sheep's Head to the north with the small village of Durrus at the head of the bay. The bay is out of the main tidal flow with no significant rivers flowing into it and is little frequented by vessels. On the eastern shore of the bay are the ruins of Dunmanus Castle built by the O'Mahony clan in 1430. To the south, Dunlough Castle, an earlier O'Mahony fortification, stands atop the cliffs at the northern perch of the Mizen peninsula.

Rinneen Island is a small islet in the bay, just off Dunmanus Pier.
