= Mathghamhain mac Cian =

Irish nobleman (died 1014)

Mathghamhain mac Cian was a nobleman of the Eóganacht Raithlind and a grandson of Brian Boru, one of the High Kings of Ireland. He was the son of Cian mac Máelmuaid and his wife Sadhbh, daughter of Brian Boru. The Leabhar Oiris records Mathghamhain fighting at the Battle of Clontarf for the High King and committing a familial revenge killing. He died at the Battle of Clontarf, in 1014.

Mathghamhain's descendants eventually became sovereigns over territory in west Cork, notably around the Iveragh Peninsula and the town of Bandon. Today, his descendants use the surname O'Mahony, O'Mahoney, Mahoney, Mahony, Maughon or Mahaney, Irish Ó Mathghamhna or modernised Ó Mathúna.
