= Holy Cross Cemetery (Malden, Massachusetts) =

Roman Catholic cemetery in Middlesex County, Massachusetts

Coordinates: 42°25′39″N 71°02′09″W

The Holy Cross Cemetery & Mausoleum is a Roman Catholic cemetery located in Malden, Massachusetts, United States. It was established in 1868 and has over a half-million interments on 180 acres.

== History ==
On May 19, 1868, the Roman Catholic Cemetery Association was incorporated to obtain up to 100 acres of land in Malden "for a rural cemetery or burial ground, and for the erection of tombs, cenotaphs or other monuments, for or in memory of the dead." The officers of the corporation were Archbishop John Joseph Williams, Father George A. Hamilton, and Father George F. Haskins. Holy Cross Cemetery was consecrated on September 27, 1868. A new chapel and mausoleum opened in 1984.

=== Grave of Patrick J. Power ===
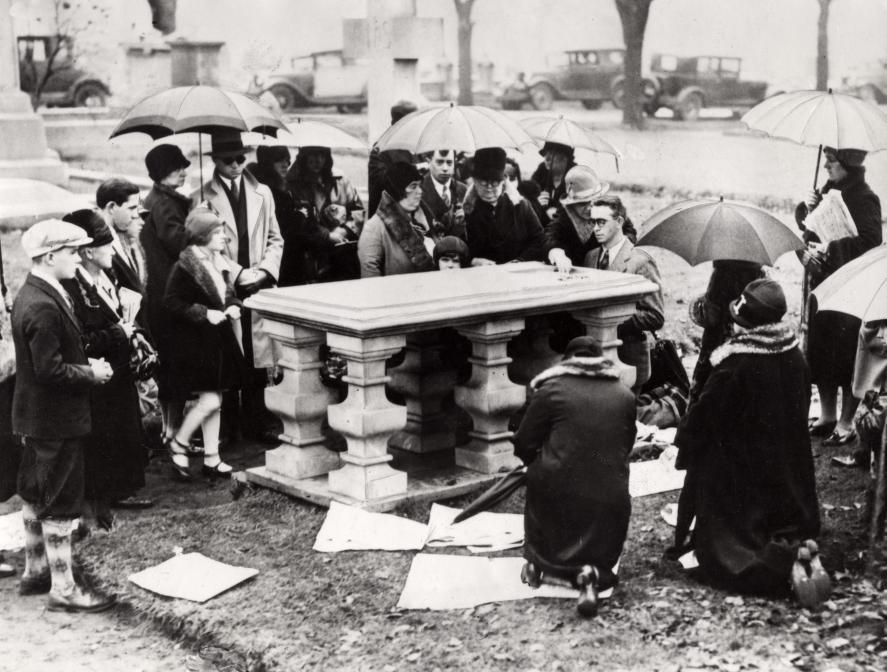
The people around the grave of Patrick J. Power believe they can be healed by touching the tombstone (1929)

In October 1929, pilgrims began flocking to the grave of, Patrick J. Power, a 25-year old priest who died in 1869. The pilgrims believed that the rain water caught in the depression on Power's tomb had curative properties. On November 10, 1929, between 100,000 and 150,000 people visited Power's grave. The tablet on his grave was damaged by the crowd and the gates were locked that night to keep the crowds out. Hundreds of people camped outside of the cemetery that night to be the first ones inside in the morning. The following day, between 50,000 and 70,000 people prayed at Power's grave. 100 officers from the Massachusetts State Police and the Malden, Everett, and Melrose police departments were brought in to keep order. 40,000 people turned up on November 13 and 50,000 came on November 14. Due to the large number of visitors, mayor John D. Devir deputized all cemetery employees as special police. On November 15, rain shrunk the number of visitors to 10,000–15,000. 30,000 people visited on November 16, including Cardinal William Henry O'Connell, who refused to comment on the alleged cures. A record 200,000 people turned out on Sunday, November 17, including Boston's mayor-elect James Michael Curley and his ill wife. Malden's entire police reserve force was called out and reinforcements were received from the Massachusetts State Police and the Metropolitan District Mounted Police as well as from the city's fire department and local American Legion post. The following day, boxer Jack Sharkey, who prayed for his partially blind daughter, was one of the 15,000 to 20,000 people who visited the grave the despite rain. A weekday record of 40,000–55,000 pilgrims turned out on November 19, including the widow of Governor Curtis Guild Jr. That day, cemetery officials announced that starting the following week, Holy Cross would only be open between 7 am and 5 pm. On November 22, Cardinal O'Connell announced that Holy Cross Cemetery would be closed to the public starting Monday (November 25) until the church could investigate the reported cures. Between 100,000 and 150,000 people visited Power's grave on the last day the cemetery was opened to the public and hundreds were turned away in the following days. On December 13, 1929, Power's body was relocated to a new grave in front of the cemetery's chapel surrounded by a 7-foot wire fence. The cemetery was temporarily opened for Christmas Eve and Christmas Day to allow people to visit the graves of their family and friends, but several hundred people were turned away from Power's grave. On April 2, 1930, cemetery officials announced that the cemetery would reopen but police would be on guard to prevent loitering at Power's grave. Dozens of people still visit Power's grave each day.

== Notable interments ==
- Joseph Gaudentius Anderson, auxiliary bishop of Boston
- Alexis Arapoff, painter
- Charles Brickley, football player and coach
- George Brickley, baseball and football player
- John Cazale, actor
- Tony Conigliaro, baseball player
- Sammy Curran, baseball player
- Dan Daly, actor
- Gerard F. Doherty, state representative and chairman of the Massachusetts Democratic Party
- Jim Donnelly, baseball player
- Paddy Duffy, boxer
- James Fitton, priest and missionary
- Thomas A. Flaherty, member of the United States House of Representatives
- Leo Hafford, baseball player and football coach
- Jerry Hurley, baseball player
- P. J. Kennedy, businessman and politician
- Clementina Poto Langone, Boston civic leader
- Frederick C. Langone, Boston city councilor
- Martin Lomasney, political boss of Boston's West End
- Toby Lyons, baseball player
- Torbert Macdonald, member of the United States House of Representatives
- Jeremiah Mahoney, Medal of Honor recipient
- Jim McKeever, baseball player
- John B. Moran, Suffolk County District Attorney
- Barney Olsen, baseball player
- Cyclone Ryan, baseball player
- John Shea, baseball player
- Jim Sullivan, baseball player
- Joe Sullivan, baseball player
- John Andrew Sullivan, member of the United States House of Representatives and the Boston Finance Commission
- Frances Sweeney, journalist and activist
- Peter Francis Tague, member of the United States House of Representatives and postmaster of Boston
- Henry A. Walsh, priest
