= John J. Douglass =

American politician (1873–1939)

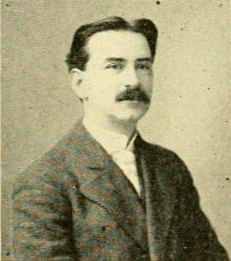

Member of the U.S. House of Representatives from Massachusetts
- In office March 4, 1925 – January 3, 1935
- Preceded by: Peter Francis Tague
- Succeeded by: John Patrick Higgins
- Constituency: 10th district (1925–33); 11th district (1933–35)

Member of the Massachusetts House of Representatives
- In office 1899–1900

Delegate to the 1917 Massachusetts Constitutional Convention
- In office June 6, 1917 – August 13, 1919

Member of the Massachusetts House of Representatives Second Suffolk District Ward 2 Boston
- In office 1906–1906

Member of the Massachusetts House of Representatives
- In office 1913–1913

Personal details
- Born: John Joseph Douglass; February 9, 1873 East Boston, Massachusetts, U.S.
- Died: April 5, 1939 (aged 66) West Roxbury, Massachusetts, U.S.
- Resting place: St. Joseph Cemetery, West Roxbury, Massachusetts
- Party: Democratic
- Education: Boston College; Georgetown University

John Joseph Douglass (February 9, 1873 – April 5, 1939) was a member of the United States House of Representatives from Massachusetts.

== Life and career ==
He was born in East Boston, Suffolk County, Massachusetts, on February 9, 1873. Douglass graduated from Boston College in 1893 and from the law department of Georgetown University, Washington, D.C., in 1896. He was admitted to the bar in 1897 and commenced practice in Boston.

Douglass was a member of the Massachusetts State House of Representatives in 1899, 1900, 1906, and again in 1913. Douglass was delegate to the Massachusetts constitutional convention in 1917 and 1918; author and playwright; delegate to the Democratic National Conventions in 1928 and 1932. Douglass was elected as a Democrat to the Sixty-ninth and to the four succeeding Congresses (March 4, 1925 – January 3, 1935); chairman, House Committee on Education (Seventy-second and Seventy-third Congresses). Douglass was an unsuccessful candidate for renomination in 1934. Douglass resumed the practice of law; served as commissioner of penal institutions of Boston from 1935 until his death in West Roxbury, Massachusetts in 1939.

Douglass is buried in St. Joseph Cemetery. He was survived by two sons; Paul Joseph Douglass of Manhasset, NY and John Joseph Douglass of Newark, DE.

U.S. House of Representatives
Preceded by Peter F. Tague	Member of the U.S. House of Representatives from Massachusetts's 10th congressional district March 4, 1925 – March 3, 1933	Succeeded by George H. Tinkham (redistricted)
Preceded by George H. Tinkham (redistricted)	Member of the U.S. House of Representatives from Massachusetts's 11th congressional district March 4, 1933 – January 3, 1935	Succeeded by John P. Higgins
Political offices
Preceded by	Member of the Massachusetts House of Representatives; 1899–1900	Succeeded by
Preceded by	Member of the Massachusetts House of Representatives; Second Suffolk District; Ward 2 Boston; 1906–1906	Succeeded by
Preceded by	Member of the Massachusetts House of Representatives; 1913–1913	Succeeded by
