= Barney Olsen =

American baseball player (1919–1977)

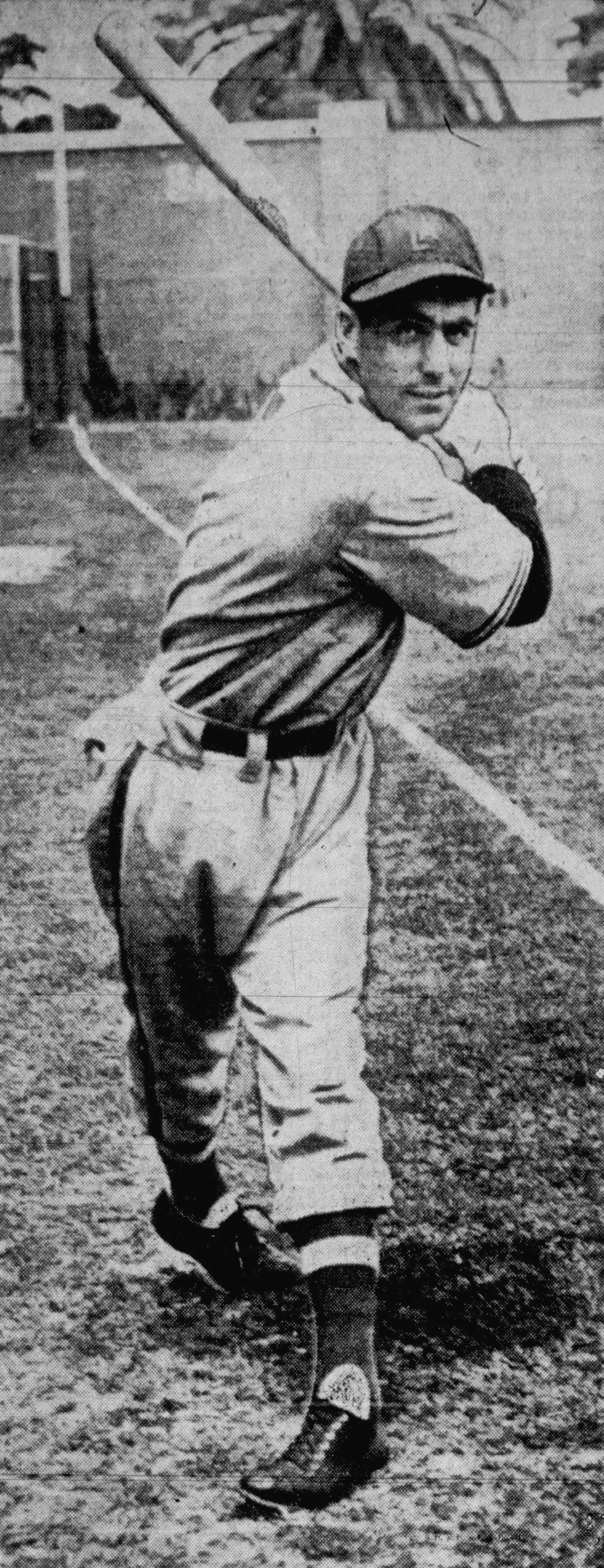
- Olsen, circa 1942
- Center fielder
- Born: September 11, 1919; Everett, Massachusetts, U.S.
- Died: March 30, 1977 (aged 57); Everett, Massachusetts, U.S.
- Batted: Right Threw: Right

MLB debut
- August 23, 1941, for the Chicago Cubs

Last MLB appearance
- September 28, 1941, for the Chicago Cubs

MLB statistics
- Batting average: .288
- Home runs: 1
- Runs batted in: 4
- Stats at Baseball Reference

Teams
- Chicago Cubs (1941)

Bernard Charles Olsen (September 11, 1919 – March 30, 1977) was an American center fielder in Major League Baseball. He played for the Chicago Cubs.

== Career ==
Olsen was born on September 11, 1919 in Everett, Massachusetts. He was a four-sport (baseball, football, basketball, and track) star at Everett High School and batted .400 during his senior season. After graduating, Olsen signed with the Chicago Cubs and was assigned to the Moline Plowboys of the Three–Eye League. He played for the Plowboys, Tulsa Oilers, Nashville Volunteers, and Milwaukee Brewers before being called up by the Cubs in 1941. He made his Major League debut on August 23, 1941 against the Brooklyn Dodgers. He started in center field and went 3 for 4 at the plate. On March 31, 1942, the Cubs sent Olsen to the Los Angeles Angels. He finished the year with a .302 average, 15 home runs, 87 RBI, and 33 stolen bases. On September 1, 1942, the Angels sold Olsen's contract to the Philadelphia Athletics. However, he never reported to Philadelphia, as his playing career was interrupted by service in the United States Navy during World War II. He returned to the Angels in 1946 and was traded to the St. Louis Cardinals prior to the start of the 1947 season for Eddie Malone. He then spent the next three seasons playing for the Cardinals farm teams in Columbus, Rochester, and Houston. He finished his career in 1950 with the independent Tampa Smokers of the Florida International League.

== Personal life ==
On November 2, 1941, Olsen married Alice Delahoyde at the Little Flower Church in Everett. After baseball, he worked as truck driver for Standard Electric Supply Company. Olsen died on March 30, 1977 at Everett's Whidden Memorial Hospital. He was buried at Holy Cross Cemetery in Malden, Massachusetts.
