= Thomas A. Flaherty =

American politician

Thomas Aloysius Flaherty
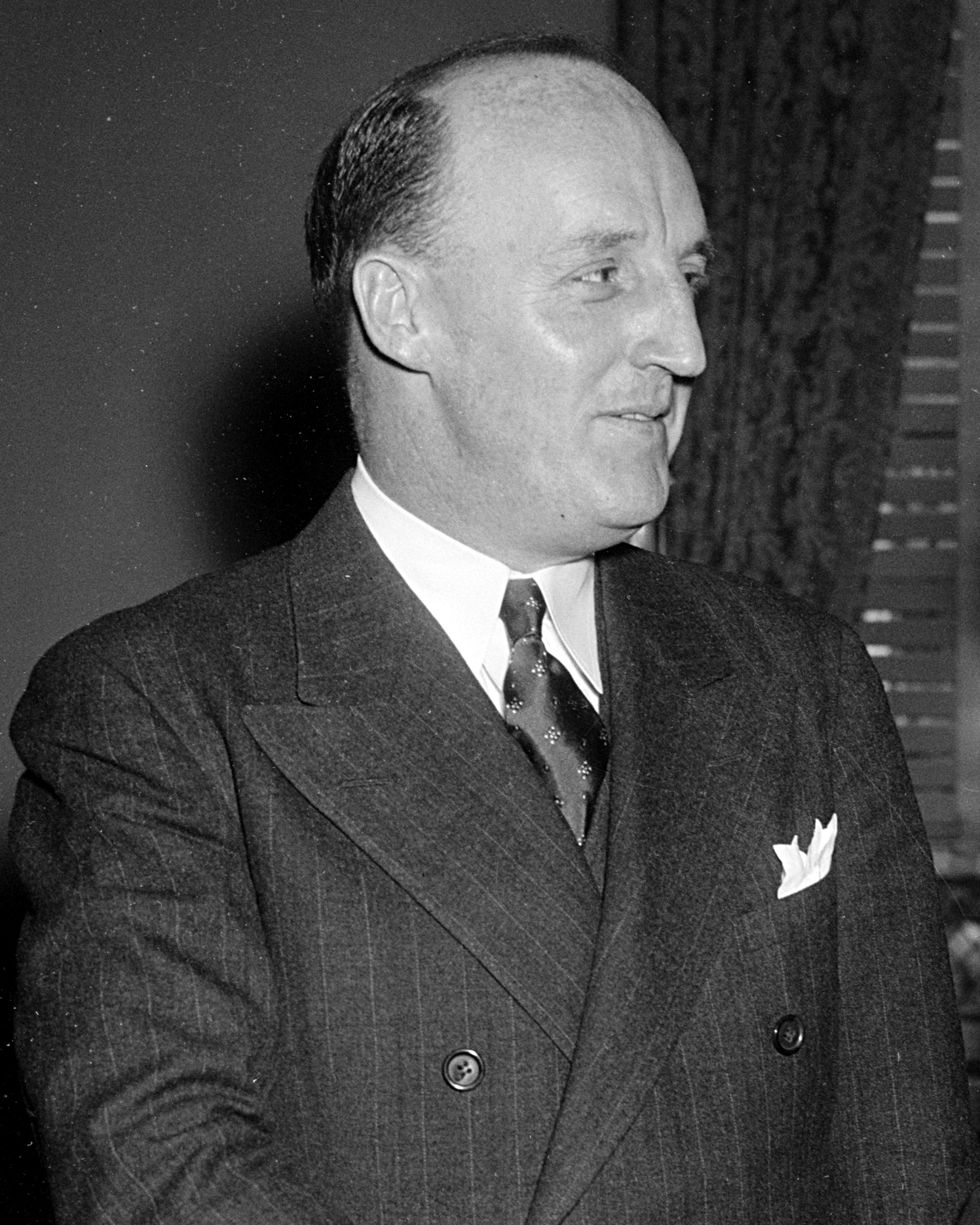

Member of the U.S. House of Representatives from Massachusetts's 11th district
- In office December 14, 1937 – January 3, 1943
- Preceded by: John Patrick Higgins
- Succeeded by: James Michael Curley

Member of the Massachusetts House of Representatives Second Suffolk District
- In office 1935-1937
- Succeeded by: John Patrick Doherty

Chair of the Massachusetts Department of Public Utilities
- In office 1945–1946
- Preceded by: Carroll L. Meins
- Succeeded by: Hirsh Freed
- In office 1949–1953
- Preceded by: Edward N. Gadsby
- Succeeded by: David M. Brackman

Personal details
- Born: December 21, 1898 Boston, Massachusetts, U.S.
- Died: April 27, 1965 (aged 66) Charlestown, Massachusetts, U.S.
- Resting place: Holy Cross Cemetery, Malden, Massachusetts
- Party: Democratic
- Education: Northeastern University
- Profession: Civil servant, real estate broker and appraiser

Military service
- Branch/service: United States Army
- Years of service: 1918
- Battles/wars: World War I

Thomas Aloysius Flaherty (December 21, 1898 – April 27, 1965) was a member of the US House of Representatives from Massachusetts. Flaherty was born in Boston, Massachusetts, December 21, 1898. He attended the public schools, Boston College High School and Northeastern University Law School.

He served as a private in the United States Army in 1918. Later he took a job with the United States Veterans' Administration in Boston before he was elected to the Massachusetts House of Representatives in 1934. In 1937, he was elected as a Democrat to the Seventy-fifth Congress to fill the vacancy caused by the resignation of John P. Higgins and was reelected to the next two succeeding Congresses, serving from December 14, 1937, to January 3, 1943. He was not a candidate for renomination in 1942.

Later in his career, he served in positions within the city of Boston including as transit commissioner from 1943 to 1945 and chairman of the Board of Review within the Assessing Department in the city of Boston from 1956 to 1960. Flaherty was also chairman of the Massachusetts Department of Public Utilities from 1946 to 1953 and served as the commissioner from 1953 to 1955. A real estate broker and appraiser, he was a resident of Charlestown, where he died on April 27, 1965. He was interred at Holy Cross Cemetery in Malden, Massachusetts.

== See also ==
- 1935–1936 Massachusetts legislature
- 1937–1938 Massachusetts legislature

== Notes ==
U.S. House of Representatives
Preceded by John P. Higgins	Member of the U.S. House of Representatives from Massachusetts's 11th congressional district December 14, 1937 – January 3, 1943	Succeeded by James Michael Curley
Political offices
Preceded by	Member of the Massachusetts House of Representatives; 1935–1937	Succeeded by John Patrick Doherty
