= Jack Mahoney =

Jack Mahon(e)y may refer to:

- Jock Mahoney (or Jacques Mahoney, 1919–1989), American actor
- Jack Mahony (footballer) (born 2001), Australian rules footballer
- Jack Mahony (rugby union), Irish international rugby union player
- Jack Mahoney (ethicist) (1931–2024), Scottish Jesuit and moral theologian
- Jack Mahoney (composer), Tin Pan Alley composer
- Jack Mahoney, the alter ego of the superhero who is known as The Moth
- Jack Mahoney (baseball)

== See also ==
- John Mahoney (disambiguation)
