= Michael Mahoney =

Michael Mahoney may refer to:

- Michael Sean Mahoney (1939–2008), historian of science
- Michael P. Mahoney (1842–1925), attempted to assassinate Mayor John Purroy Mitchel of New York City
- Mike Mahoney (catcher) (born 1972), Major League Baseball catcher
- Mike Mahoney (first baseman) (1873–1940), first baseman in Major League Baseball
- Mike Mahoney (footballer) (born 1950), English football goalkeeper
- Mike Mahoney (American football) (born 1951), American college football player and coach
- Jerry Mahoney (umpire) (Michael Jeremiah Mahoney, 1860–1947), Major League Baseball umpire
- Michael Mahoney-Johnson (born 1976), English footballer
- Mike Ma (born 1995), American ecofascist writer
- Michael Mahoney, 19th-century American thief known by the alias Wreck Donovan
- Michael Mahoney, a character in the film A Night Like This
