= Chris Mahoney =

Chris or Christopher Mahoney or Mahony may refer to:

- Chris Mahony (born 1981), rugby union player
- Chris Mahoney (baseball) (1885–1954), Major League Baseball player
- Chris Mahoney (rower) (born 1959), British rower
- Christopher J. Mahoney (fl. 2000s–2020s), U.S. Marine Corps general
