= Frank Mahoney =

Frank Mahoney may refer to:

- Ike Mahoney (Frank John Mahoney Jr., 1901–1961), American football player
- Frank Mahoney (athlete) (born 1929), Bermudian Olympic sprinter
- Benjamin Franklin "Frank" Mahoney, American co-founder of the Ryan Airline Company

== See also ==
- Frank Mahony (disambiguation)
- Francis Mahoney (disambiguation)
