= Frank Mahony =

Frank Mahony may refer to:

- Frank P. Mahony (1862–1916), Australian artist
- Frank Mahony (public servant) (1915–2000), Australian public servant and Director-General of ASIO

== See also ==
- Francis Sylvester Mahony, Irish humorist and journalist
- Frank Mahoney (disambiguation)
