= Paul Mahoney =

Paul Mahoney may refer to:

- Paul G. Mahoney (born 1959), American law professor
- Paul John Mahoney (born 1946), British jurist, appointed to the European Court of Human Rights

== See also ==
- Mahoney
