= John P. Higgins =

American politician

John Patrick Higgins
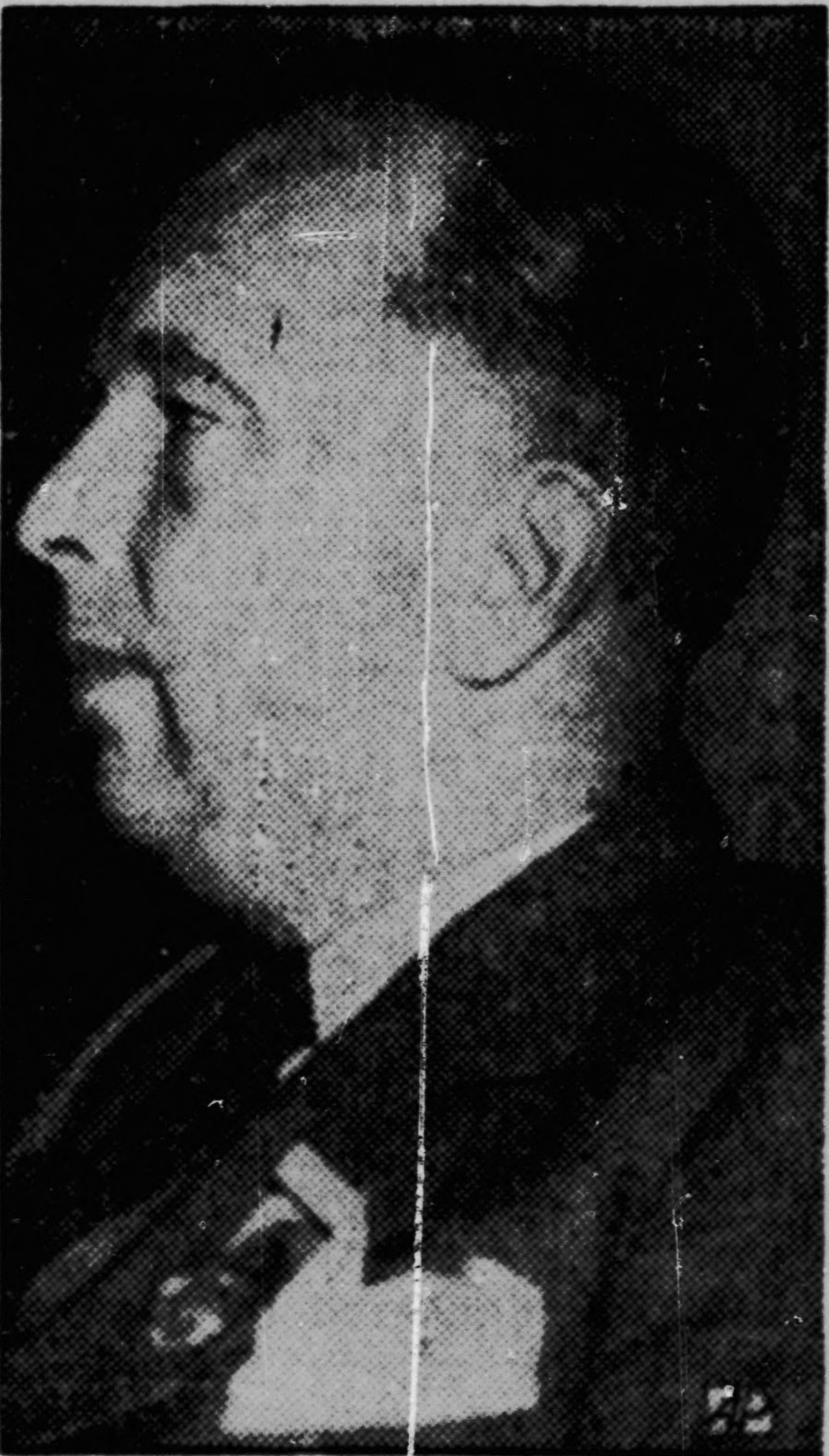

Member of the U.S. House of Representatives from Massachusetts's 11th district
- In office January 3, 1935 – September 30, 1937
- Preceded by: John J. Douglass
- Succeeded by: Thomas A. Flaherty

Member of the Massachusetts House of Representatives
- In office 1929-1934

Personal details
- Born: February 19, 1893 Boston, Massachusetts, U.S.
- Died: August 2, 1955 (aged 62) Boston, Massachusetts, U.S.
- Spouse: Elinor McNamara
- Children: 1
- Education: Harvard University; Boston University Law School; Northeastern College of Law
- Profession: Chemist, Attorney, Jurist

Military service
- Branch/service: United States Navy
- Years of service: 1917–1919
- Rank: Ensign
- Battles/wars: World War I

John Patrick Higgins (February 19, 1893 – August 2, 1955) was an officer in the United States Navy, chemist, attorney, and U.S. Representative from Massachusetts.

Higgins was born in Boston, Massachusetts, where he attended the public schools and graduated from Harvard University in 1917. During the First World War, he served as an Ensign in the United States Navy from 1917 until 1919. Returning to civilian life, Higgins was employed as a chemist from 1919 until 1922. He then resumed his academic studies, enrolling in the Boston University Law School and Northeastern College of Law in 1925 and 1926. He was admitted to the bar in 1927 and commenced practice in Boston.

Entering politics, Higgins was a member of the Massachusetts House of Representatives from 1929 through 1934. He was elected as a Democrat to the Seventy-fourth Congress, was unopposed in his re-election to the Seventy-fifth Congress and served from January 3, 1935, until his resignation on September 30, 1937.

Higgins was appointed by Gov. Charles F. Hurley on October 1, 1937, as chief justice of the Massachusetts Superior Court, in which capacity he served until his death in 1955. He was the first Irish Catholic to be chief justice and the youngest person ever appointed to the post. He was a Knight of Columbus.

Appointed in January 1946 by the Justice Department with the approval of President Truman to be the United States judge on the 11 country International Military Tribunal for the Far East at Tokyo, Japan, Judge Higgins resigned in June 1946 to return to his family and his duties as Chief Justice of the Massachusetts Superior Court.

During his Congressional career, Congressman Higgins advocated for improved working conditions and benefits in America and against religious persecution in Mexico.

Higgins died in Boston and was interred in St. Joseph Cemetery, West Roxbury, Massachusetts.

== See also ==
- 1929–1930 Massachusetts legislature
- 1933–1934 Massachusetts legislature

== Works cited ==
- Lapomarda, Vincent A. (1992). The Knights of Columbus in Massachusetts (second ed.). Norwood, Massachusetts: Knights of Columbus Massachusetts State Council.

U.S. House of Representatives
| Preceded by John J. Douglass | Member of the U.S. House of Representatives from Massachusetts's 11th congressional district January 3, 1935 – September 30, 1937 | Succeeded by Thomas A. Flaherty |
Legal offices
| Preceded by | Chief Justice of the Massachusetts Superior Court; October 1, 1937 – August 2, 1955 | Succeeded by |
| Preceded by None | judge of the International Military Tribunal for the Far East; January 3, 1946 – June 1946 | Succeeded by None |
