= Kilcoe Castle =

15th-century castle in West Cork, Ireland

- Kilcoe Castle in 2013

- Kilcoe Castle in Ireland
- 51.54024°N 9.41442°W
- Type: Medieval castle

History
- Built: 1458
- Built for: MacCarthys of Muskerry

Site notes
- Height: 26 m (85 ft)
- Area: County Cork, Ireland
- Architectural style: Tower house
- Restored: 2004
- Governing body: On private land
- Owner: Jeremy Irons

Kilcoe Castle is a 15th-century coastal tower house located on a 0.81 ha (2 acres) island, called Mannin Beg, in the Kilcoe townland in Roaringwater Bay in West Cork, Ireland.

== Design ==
The structure, similar to some other tower houses of Irish clans involved in maritime and fishing trade, is built directly on the coastline, with parts of rock smoothened and made into a slipway, possibly to enable the hauling up of boats, fishnets and supplies. The building is a rectangular, four-storey tower 20 m (65 ft) in height, with another 26 m (85 ft) high, seven-storey tower, with a smaller footprint, attached at one corner. The design with a flanking tower is characteristic of West Cork castles, another example is Dunmanus Castle situated on the opposite side of the peninsula. In steep stairsteps there are slits that were designed to allow the castle's defenders to poke intruders with spears, a common feature in medieval castles. Its walls are between 0.91 and 2.13 m (3 and 7 ft) thick.

There are passages in the walls between the larger tower and the smaller one, enabling access to individual rooms. Two of these rooms could serve as prisons, with the upper one with windows for more valuable prisoners and hostages, and the lower dark one for the more common criminals. The arrangement with two prison rooms, and the fact that the dungeon was on one of the upper floors rather than underground, may have been unique to this castle. The towers are furnished with crenellations typical of Irish tower houses. The structure is surrounded by a stone wall which offered privacy and protection against the waves and intruders. The wall is punctured by arrow loops, and topped with a walkway. It is the largest castle in the Roaringwater Bay, and the design with an additional corner tower distinguishes it from other tower houses in the area.

== History ==
The castle was built in 1458 by the Clan Dermod branch of the MacCarthys. In 1603, during a lengthy siege, it was defended by Fineen O'Driscoll's son Conchobhar (Connor) and ultimately surrendered to the English forces of George Carew led by Captain George Flower. According to legend, the invaders threw the defenders off the top. It was the last castle to fall in Munster (and more specifically in the former barony of Carbery) after the defeat at Kinsale. After the surrender, the castle fell into disrepair, and it was not until 1966 when the farmer who owned the land where the castle was situated registered it. In 1972, it was sold to Edward Samuel, an architect based in London.

== Restoration ==
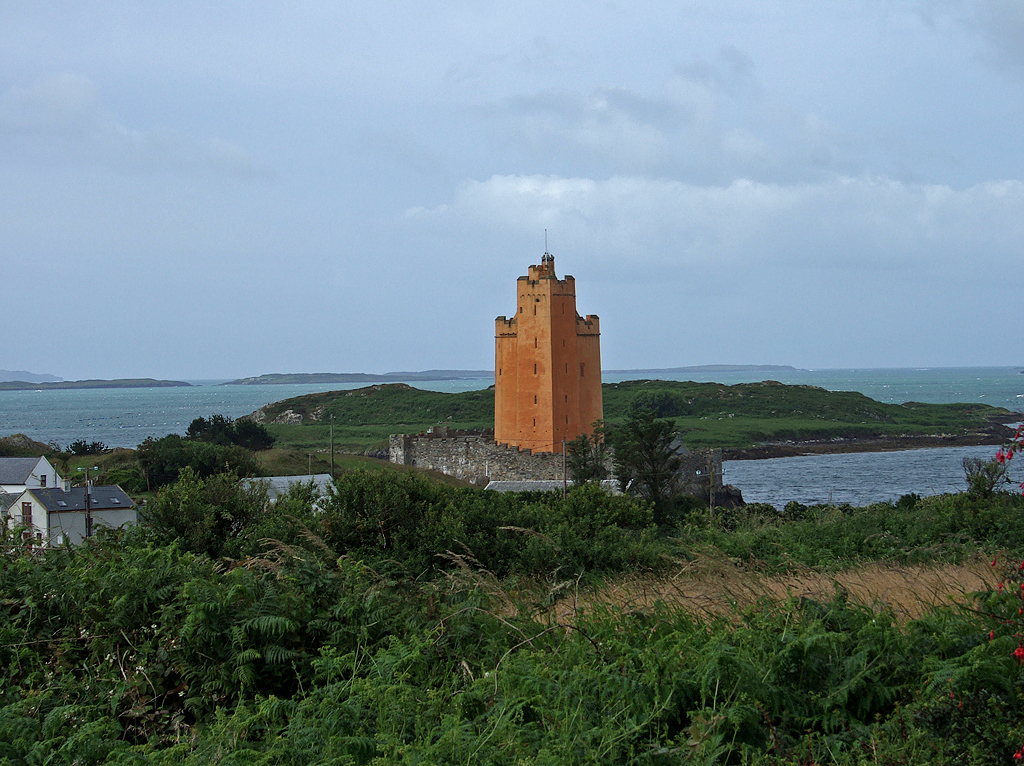
A view of the castle in 2007

Since the late 1970s, a planning permission existed obtained by Samuel to restore the building for residential use. He also built a bridge linking the castle's island with the mainland.

In 1996, the castle was offered for sale. Despite some protests against giving it to private ownership, in 1997 the land and the castle were purchased for IR£150,000 by English actor, Jeremy Irons, who had already lived in a farmhouse in the vicinity with his wife Sinéad Cusack. They lodged a new planning permission application in February 1998, with the plan to spend over £1 million on restoration. Restoration plans included a store room on the ground floor; dormitory-type design on the first floor; a kitchen, living room, and dining room on the third; a chapel and a library on the fourth; and an en-suite bedroom on the fifth. In place of a traditional septic tank, a peat-based biocycle system was installed. The main tower's third floor was made into a large, two-storey living space, a solar, with plenty of daylight. The tower's turret on floor seven was also restored. Irons took a year off acting to focus on the project, and planned to offer the castle as a retreat to writers, historians and archeologists. He has also made castle tours available for fundraising initiatives.

The restoration was done in a way to minimise the disturbance to the fabric of the building, for example no holes were drilled in the external masonry. Lime mortar and harling finish was put on the outside of the towers. Additional parts of walls and buildings, for example a cottage based on originally preserved foundations, were built. Supervision, designs, and planning were carried out by a team of experts from the UK, Ireland, and France; and for the work itself Irons hired local people, often ones who randomly showed up at his door. Stone for restoration was brought in from Castlehaven, County Cork and Liscannor, County Clare, and a crane to support the works from France. The entire restoration, the leading theme of which Irons described as a "jazz riff on the medieval", took six years to complete.

=== Colour ===
There were contentions initially as to the colour of the facade, but ultimately it was decided on peach-coloured mixture of ferrous sulphate used in iron fillings with limewash which was expected to oxidize gracefully and retain a "terra-cotta orange" colour. The owner himself referred to the colour as "ochre", protested against calling it "pink", and dismissed the occasional criticism. As a counter to the concerns of some critics, who stated that the castle should have retained a grey stone facade, additional evidence has suggested that some medieval castles were rendered on the outside and painted using available dyes.
