= Dunmanus Castle =

15th century gothic castle on Mizen peninsula, Ireland

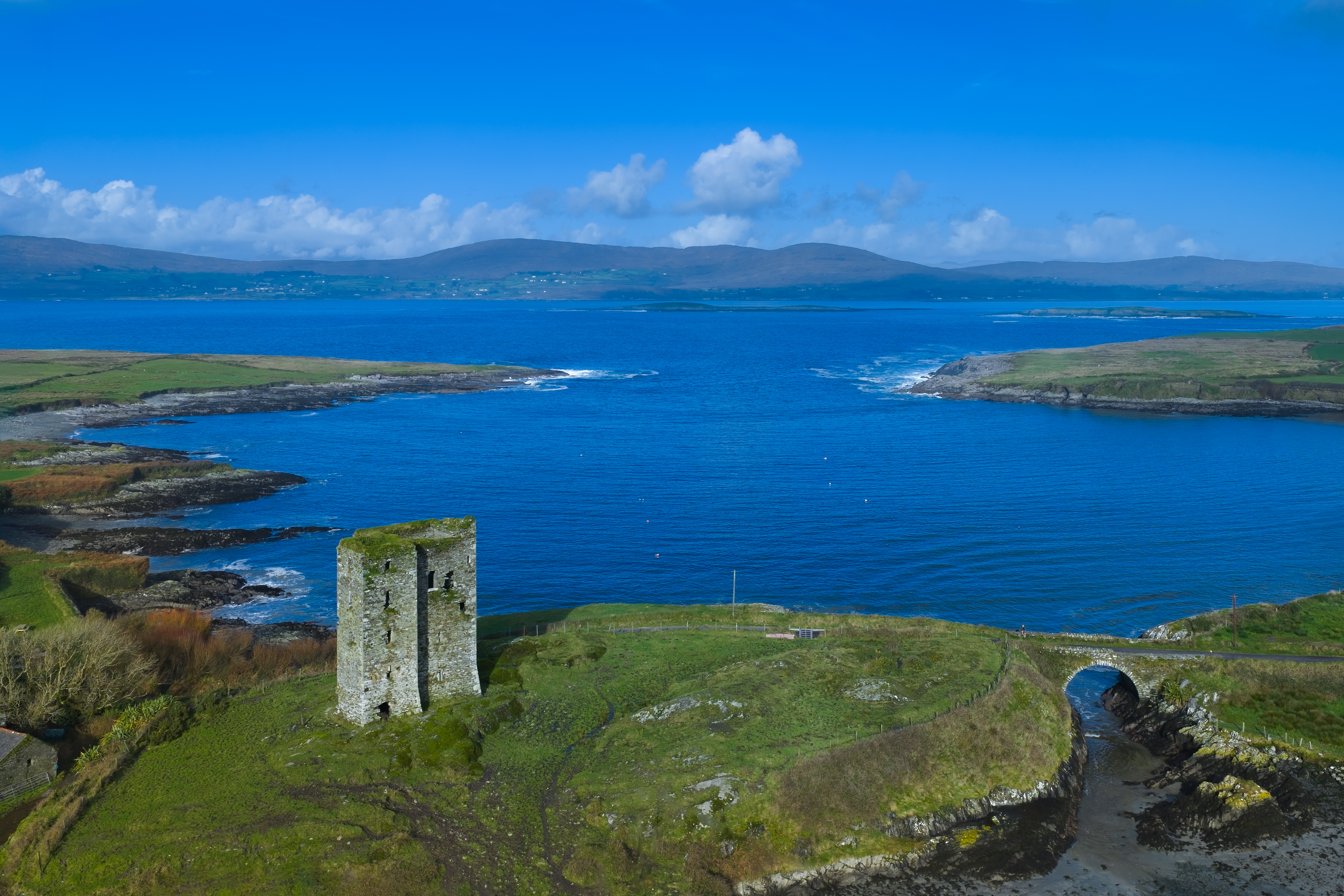
- The castle with Dunmanus Bay in the background

- Dunmanus Castle in Ireland
- 51.53962°N 9.66402°W
- Type: Medieval castle

History
- Built: between 1430-60
- Built for: O'Mahonys

Site notes
- Area: County Cork, Ireland
- Architectural style: tower house
- Governing body: On private land

Dunmanus Castle is a 15th-century coastal gothic tower house located on a rock outcrop on the southern side of Dunmanus Bay in West Cork, Ireland.

== History ==
The castle is one of reportedly 12 castles belonging to the family of O'Mahonys in West Cork, with other examples being the castles on Three Castle Head and in Rossbrin. The Dunmanus Castle is said to have been built by Donogh O'Mahony in 1430, although other accounts date the construction to between 1440 and 1460. In 1602, during the Siege of Dunboy, one of Carew's sergeants with a group of soldiers raided Dunmanus Castle and took cattle and horses. Weeks later the castle was raided again, this time by Owen O'Sullivan, who killed all four guards and used the tower house to facilitate the plundering of the land around it. Ultimately the Irish clans were outlawed in 1643, and their lands, including the Dunmanus Castle, were handed over to the new English settlers.

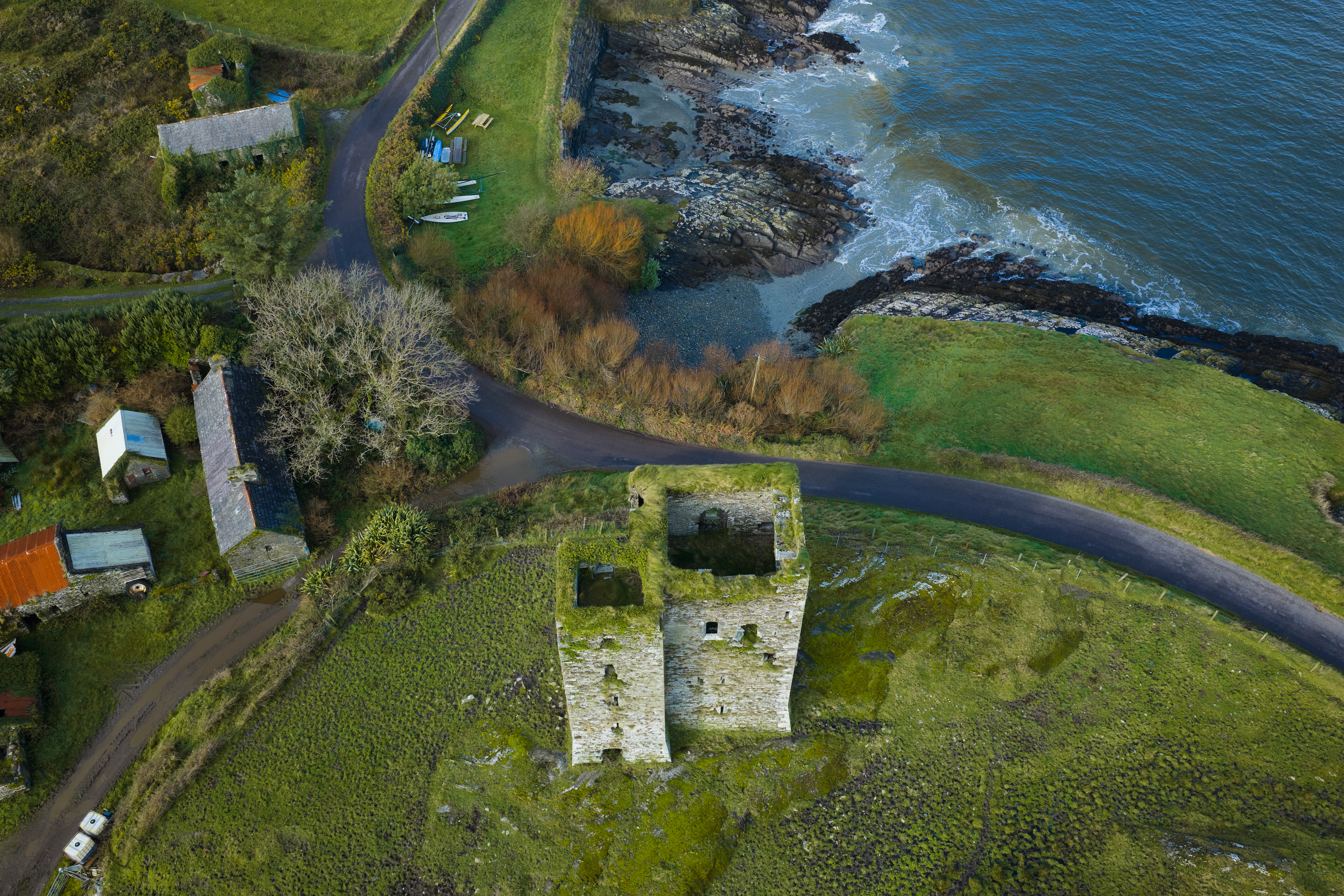
Dunmanus Castle, aerial view clearly showing the design with additional tower

== Design ==
The tower house design is typical of Irish clan castles, and is thought to have been a prototype for other tower houses in the region. It is located on the shoreline, on a rock outcrop naturally extending from the Dunmanus Harbour. The structure was constructed on the site of an earlier fort which might have been called Dún Manus. There is a ground level entrance to the ground floor, and the raised main entrance above it to the upper chambers. This arrangement was typical of Irish tower houses, and provided better protection against intruders. The living chambers were situated on the third floor, above vaulting, and had three wide windows, each decorated differently. Less common features of Dunmanus Castle include the adjoining second five-story tower, similar to the castles of Kilcoe and Blarney, a complex of stairways connecting the tower to the three stories of the main tower, and the presence of a dungeon. The square dungeon is 3.5 meter square and 3 meters high, and the only entry to it was through a trap door covered with a slab of stone. On the west wall of the castle there had been a stone carving of what is said to have been Donagh O'Mahoney, but it was stolen in the 1976.

== Restoration attempts ==
Unsuccessful calls for restoration were made as early as in 1962, and then in the 1970s. A survey done in 1982 revealed that "..repairs are required around the window opes [of the north wall]. There are also breaks around the window opes in the south wall which need to be repaired. In the west wall, there is a large vertical breach which needs to built up and the east wall also needs to be built up. The tops of the walls are being ravelled away and would need to be repaired". In 1984, a campaign was started by the descendants of the O'Mahony clan to restore the castle, with the aim to acquire the building and transform it into a heritage centre and museum. The declaration was made during the 32nd annual gathering of O'Mahonys at the site, a tradition started by Eoin 'Pope' O'Mahony who considered Dunmanus his favourite castle, and to honour whom a plaque in front of the castle was unveiled in 1971.
