= Cian mac Máelmuaid =

Cían mac Máelmuaid was a son of Máel Muad mac Brain, who was twice King of Munster. Cían's father had been killed by Brian Boru at the Battle of Belach Lechta. He was a member of Uí Echach Muman or Eóganacht Raithlind, and an "ancestor of the family of O'Mahony".

Cían became a close ally of Brian, and reputedly married his daughter Sadb, according to later traditions and the antiquarian John O'Mahony. Several sources suggest that Cian lived at Enniskean in County Cork, and that the village derives its name from him.

He had a son, Mathghamhain mac Cian who died at the Battle of Clontarf in 1014.
