= Tim Mahoney (disambiguation) =

Tim Mahoney (born 1956) is a U.S. representative who represented Florida.

Tim Mahoney may also refer to:

- Tim Mahoney (Minnesota politician) (born 1953), member of the Minnesota House of Representatives
- Timothy S. Mahoney, Pennsylvania politician
- Tim Mahoney (guitarist), musician from Omaha, Nebraska
- Tim Mahoney, contestant on the inaugural season of The Voice
- Tim Mahoney (North Dakota politician), mayor of Fargo, North Dakota
