= Daniel Mahoney =

Daniel Mahoney may refer to:

- Daniel A. Mahoney (1849–1893), Wisconsin Democratic legislator from Kenosha County
- Daniel O. Mahoney (1854–1944), Wisconsin Republican legislator from Vernon County
- Danny Mahoney (1888–1960), American baseball player
- J. Daniel Mahoney (1931–1996), New York Conservative politician and judge
