= Matthew Mahoney =

Matthew Mahoney may refer to:

- Matthew Mahoney (footballer) (born 1968), former Australian rules footballer
- Matt Mahoney (soccer) (born 1995), American soccer player
- Matt Mahoney, a developer of PAQ
- Matt Mahoney, city councillor for Ward 8 (Erin Mills) in Mississauga
