= John Mahoney (disambiguation) =

John Mahoney (1940–2018) was an English-American actor.

John Mahoney may also refer to:

- John Mahoney (footballer) (born 1946), Welsh international footballer
- John Christopher Mahoney (1882–1952), United States federal judge
- John Francis Mahoney (1884–1929), Canadian lawyer and political figure
- John Friend Mahoney (1889–1957), American physician
- John J. Mahoney, member of the Massachusetts House of Representatives since 2011
- John Mahoney (Ohio politician) (1949–2011), member of the Ohio Senate
- John W. Mahoney (1926–2006), lawyer, judge and politician in Newfoundland, Canada
- J. Daniel Mahoney (1931–1996), judge of the United States Court of Appeals
- John Mahony (ethicist) (born 1931), Scottish Jesuit and moral theologian
- John C. Mahoney (mayor) (1881–1946), American mayor

== See also ==
- John Mahony (1863–1943), Irish sportsman
- John Keefer Mahony (1911–1990), Canadian Victoria Cross recipient
- Jack Mahoney (disambiguation)
