= Segal McCambridge Singer & Mahoney =

American law firm

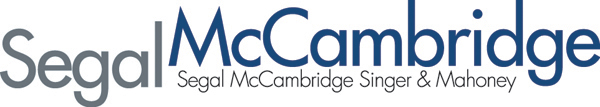
- Headquarters: Willis Tower; 233 S. Wacker Drive; Suite 5500; Chicago, Illinois
- No. of offices: 10 U.S. Offices
- No. of attorneys: 140
- No. of employees: approximately 350
- Major practice areas: Toxic Tort and General Litigation
- Key people: William Mahoney (Co-Chair); Christian Gannon (Co-Chair); Mark Crane (Managing Shareholder)
- Date founded: 1986
- Founder: Donald Segal; Edward J. McCambridge; Jeffrey Singer; William F. Mahoney
- Company type: Corporation
- Website: smsm.com

Segal McCambridge Singer & Mahoney, Ltd., is a U.S.-based law firm with approximately 140 lawyers in eight offices. Headquartered in Chicago, Illinois, Segal McCambridge is a litigation firm with broad experience in appellate, commercial, complex toxic tort, construction, employment and labor law, environmental, insurance, pharmaceutical and medical device, professional liability, products liability, transportation and warranty matters.

== Overview ==
In 1986, Chicago attorneys William F. Mahoney, Edward J. McCambridge, Donald Segal, and Jeffrey Singer, founded Segal McCambridge Singer & Mahoney, Ltd. By the mid-nineties, the firm had grown to 20 attorneys. Today, Segal McCambridge has ten offices across the United States: Austin (1999), Chicago (1986), Detroit (1997), Ft. Lauderdale (2020), Houston (2018), Indianapolis (2021), Jersey City (2008), New York City (2003), Philadelphia (2000), and St. Louis (2015).

Segal McCambridge is headquartered in the Willis Tower (formerly the Sears Tower) in Chicago, Illinois.

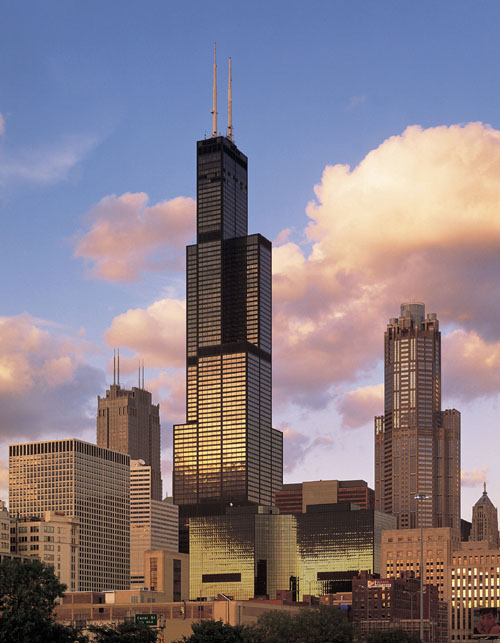
Segal McCambridge is headquartered in the Willis Tower (formerly the Sears Tower) in Chicago, IL.

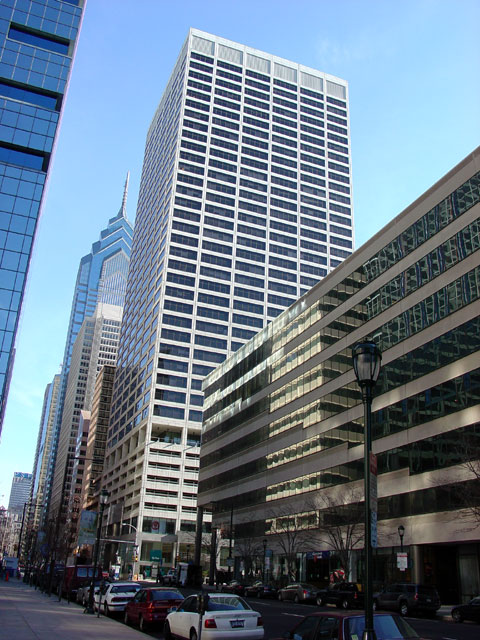
1818 Market Street, home to Segal McCambridge's Philadelphia office.
