= Richard Mahoney (disambiguation) =

Richard Mahoney (born 1951) is a former Secretary of State of Arizona.

Richard Mahoney may also refer to:

- Richard Mahoney (Costa Rican footballer) in 2002 Copa Interclubes UNCAF
- Richard Mahoney (rugby union) in 2007–08 National Division Three South
- Richard J. Mahoney, Canadian political candidate
