= Jim Mahoney (umpire) =

Australian rules football umpire

James Francis Mahoney (17 November 1931 – 26 November 2004) was an Australian football goal umpire in the VFL. Mahoney's career lasted 30 years. He was awarded Life membership of the Victorian Football League Umpires Association in 1974 and was VFL Goal Umpires Advisor (1981–87). Mahoney umpired 289 games at the elite level as a goal umpire.

== Early life ==
Mahoney was born on 17 November 1931, in Newtown, New South Wales. In 1942 his family moved to Port Melbourne, Victoria. There he played football for the Port Melbourne Football Club thirds in the VFA. During his playing career his team managed to stay undefeated for 7 seasons (127 games). In 1959 he retired from football aged 27 to take up goal umpiring.

== Umpiring career ==
Mahoney began umpiring at the VFL Reserve Grade. He umpired in the 1964 VFL Reserve Grade grand finale. The following year, after the retirement of Jack Lee, Mahoney was promoted to the VFL senior list. Mahoney umpired in the semi-finals of the VFL in 1967, however it was not until 1971 that he officiated in a VFL grand finale.

He became a VFL Umpires Association life member in 1974. In 1981, having reached the then mandatory retirement age of 50, he ended his on-field career. The 1981 VFL grand final was a fitting end to a career believed at the time to be a record for goal umpiring at 289 matches.

== Coaching career ==
Despite initial thoughts that his involvement was finished following the 1981 season, Jim would give another six years to goal umpiring as the inaugural VFL Goal Umpires Advisor. His term was a watershed for goal umpiring.

For the first time goalies had a recognized coach and, with Assistant Coach Barry Page and a panel of former goal umpires as observers, he began coaching his squad with the experience and a philosophy from his own career. Physical fitness became a priority, all matches were observed and assessed by a goal umpires observer and over a number of years the average age of the list began to drop as younger men were given opportunities at the highest level.

== Achievements ==
- VFL Umpires Association life member
- Most games for any goal umpire in the VFL (later research revealed Charles Bell had in fact umpired more matches - 310)
- VFL Goal Umpires Advisor (1981-7)

== See also ==
- List of Australian rules football umpires
