= Thomas Mahoney =

Thomas Mahoney may refer to:

- Thomas Mahoney (architect) (1855–1923), New Zealand architect
- Thomas H. D. Mahoney (1913–1997), American professor and politician
- Thomas Joseph Mahony, Canadian politician
