= Anne Rankin Mahoney =

American sociologist

- Born: Anne Rankin; September 7, 1937; Pennsylvania, U.S.
- Died: September 19, 2025 (aged 88); Denver, Colorado, U.S.
- Occupations: Sociologist, writer, college professor

Anne Rankin Mahoney (September 7, 1937 – September 19, 2025) was an American sociologist, writer, and college professor. She taught at the University of Denver for 33 years.

== Early life and education ==
Anne Rankin was from Meadville, Pennsylvania, the daughter of William T. Rankin and Ardena Jackson Rankin. She graduated from Kent State University in 1959, with a bachelor's degree in sociology and English. She earned a master's degree in sociology at Northwestern University, and completed doctoral studies in sociology at Columbia University.

== Career ==
Mahoney was director of research for the Manhattan Bail Project from 1961 to 1963. She taught sociology at Brooklyn College and Hunter College. She was a professor of sociology and criminology at the University of Denver for 33 years, and was director of the women's studies program there from 1992 to 1995. She attended the International Forum on Women in Beijing. She retired from the University of Denver in 2006, with emerita status.

== Publications ==
Mahoney's scholarship focused on juvenile justice and family dynamics, and was published in academic journals including Inquiry, Family Relations, Law & Society Review, Children and Youth Services Review, Journal of Marital and Family Therapy, Justice Quarterly, Journal of Aging Studies, Journal of Applied Behavioral Science, Early Childhood Education Journal, Journal of Social Issues, Judicature, Michigan Family Review, Family Process, and The Justice System Journal. Mahoney also wrote poetry, and a memoir.

- "Factors Affecting Physicians' Choice of Group or Independent Practice" (1973)
- "The Effect of Labeling Upon Youths in the Juvenile Justice System: A Review of the Evidence" (1974)
- "Gifted delinquents: What do we know about them?" (1980)
- "Family Participation for Juvenile Offenders in Deinstitutionalization Programs" (1981)
- "American Jury Voir Dire and the Ideal of Equal justice" (1982)
- "Time and Process in Juvenile Court" (1985)
- "Jury trial for juveniles: Right or ritual?" (1985)
- Juvenile Justice in Context (1987)
- "Citizen Evaluation of Judicial Performance: The Colorado Experience" (1988)
- "Change in the older-person role: An application of Turner's process role and model of role change" (1994)
- Ruts: Gender Roles and Realities (1996, editor)
- "Children, families, and feminism: Perspectives on teaching" (1996)
- "Gender Dilemmas and Myth in the Construction of Marital Bargains: Issues for Marital Therapy" (1996, with Carmen Knudson-Martin)
- "Language and Processes in the Construction of Equality in New Marriages" (1998, with Carmen Knudson-Martin)
- "Will Old Gender Scripts Limit New Millennium Families' Ability to Thrive?" (2000, with Carmen Knudson-Martin)
- "Beyond Different Worlds: A 'Postgender' Approach to Relational Development" (2004, with Carmen Knudson-Martin)
- "Moving Beyond Gender: Processes that Create Relationship Equality" (2005, with Carmen Knudson-Martin)
- Couples, Gender, and Power: Creating Change in Intimate Relationships (2009, with Carmen Knudson-Martin)
- Both Career and Love: A Woman's Memoir 1959–1973 (2020)
- Moments (poems, 2025)

== Personal life ==
Rankin married lawyer Barry Mahoney in 1965. They had two children. She died in 2025, at the age of 88.
