= Brian Mahoney =

Brian Mahoney may refer to:

- Brian Mahoney (footballer) (born 1952), English footballer
- Brian Mahoney (basketball) (born 1948), American college basketball coach

== See also ==
- Bryan Mahoney (disambiguation)
