= Jack Mahony (rugby union) =

Irish rugby union player

- Born: Cork, Ireland
- Died: 14 June 1974

Rugby union career
- Position: No. 8
International career
Years	Team	Apps	(Points)
1923	Ireland	1	(0)

Jack Mahony was an Irish international rugby union player.

Educated at Christian Brothers College, Cork, Mahony was a CBC rugby and swimming captain, while also playing hurling for the school. He captained the Munster Schools representative rugby team.

Mahony gained an Ireland cap in a match against the 1923 grand slam-winning England team at Leicester, with persistent injuries derailing his career thereafter. He played club rugby for Cork Constitution and Dolphin.

== See also ==
- List of Ireland national rugby union players
