= Dunlough Castle =

Norman fortification in County Cork, Ireland

Coordinates: 51°28′58″N 9°49′46″W

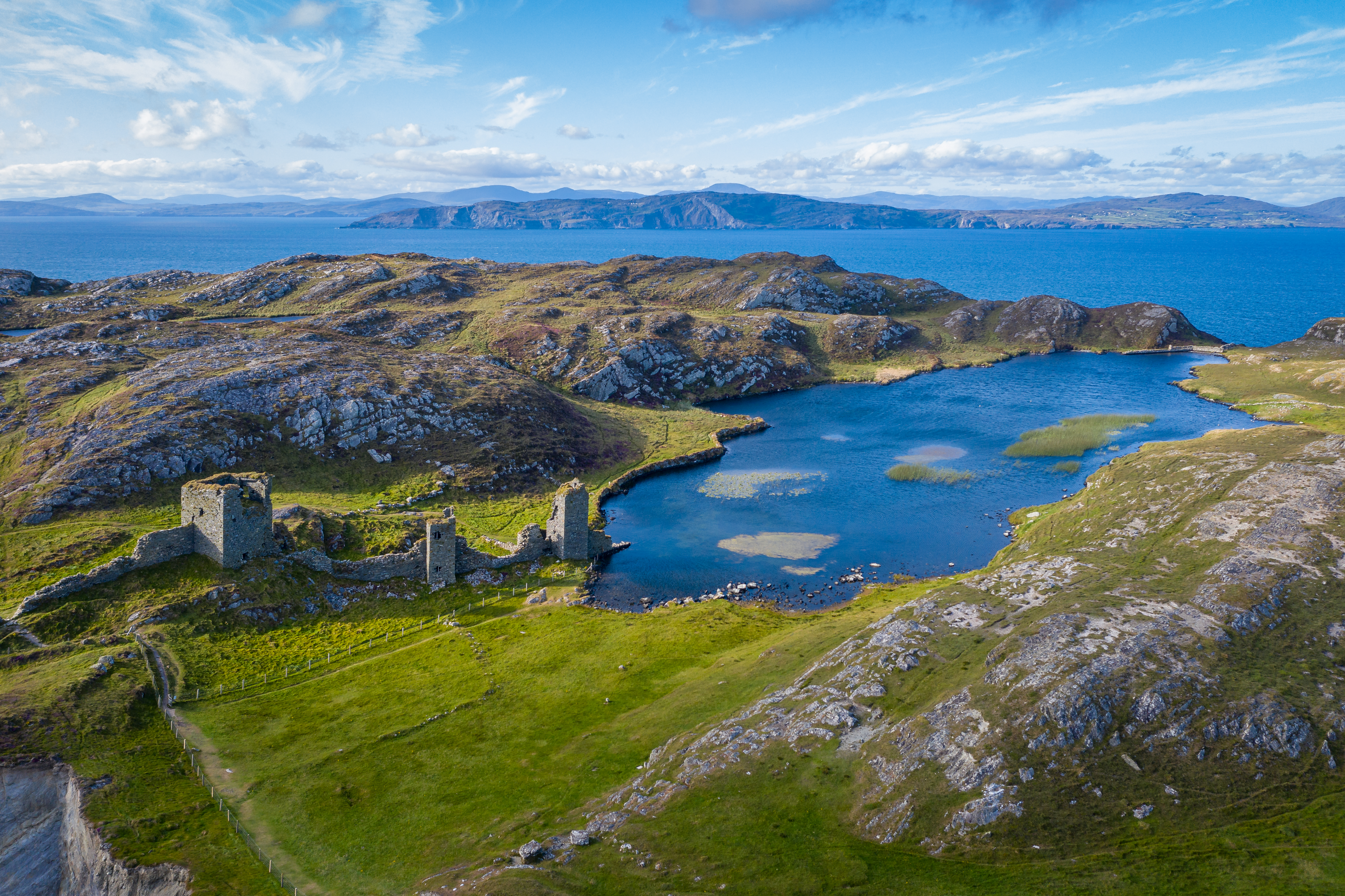
View of Dunlough Castle

Dunlough Castle, standing atop the cliffs at the northern tip of the Mizen Peninsula, looks at the Atlantic Ocean from the extreme southwest point of Ireland. Founded in 1207 by Donagh O’Mahony, Dunlough is one of the oldest castles in Ireland and an example of Norman architecture and dry stone masonry.

== Physical characteristics ==
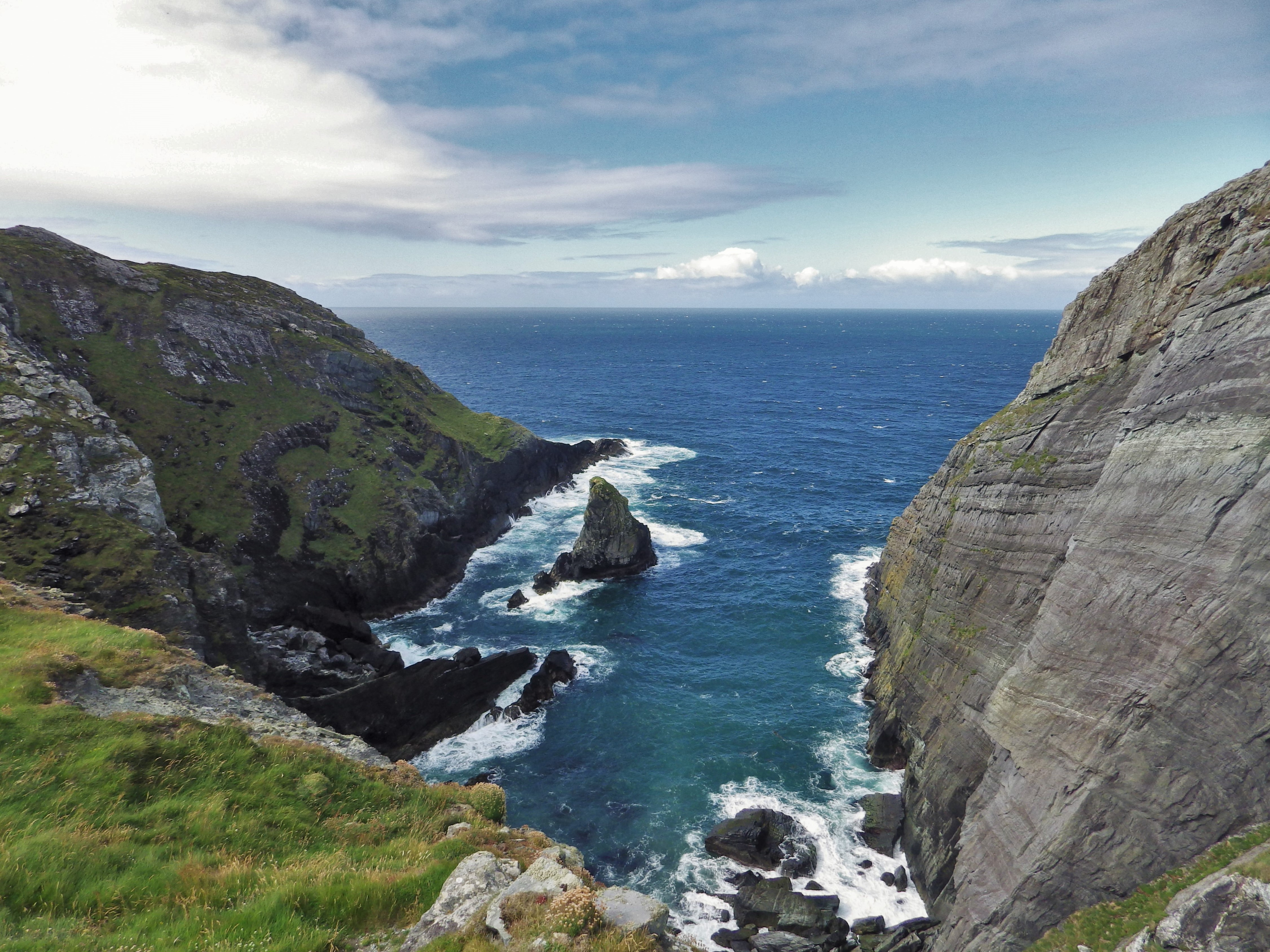
"Three Castles Head" facing the Atlantic Ocean

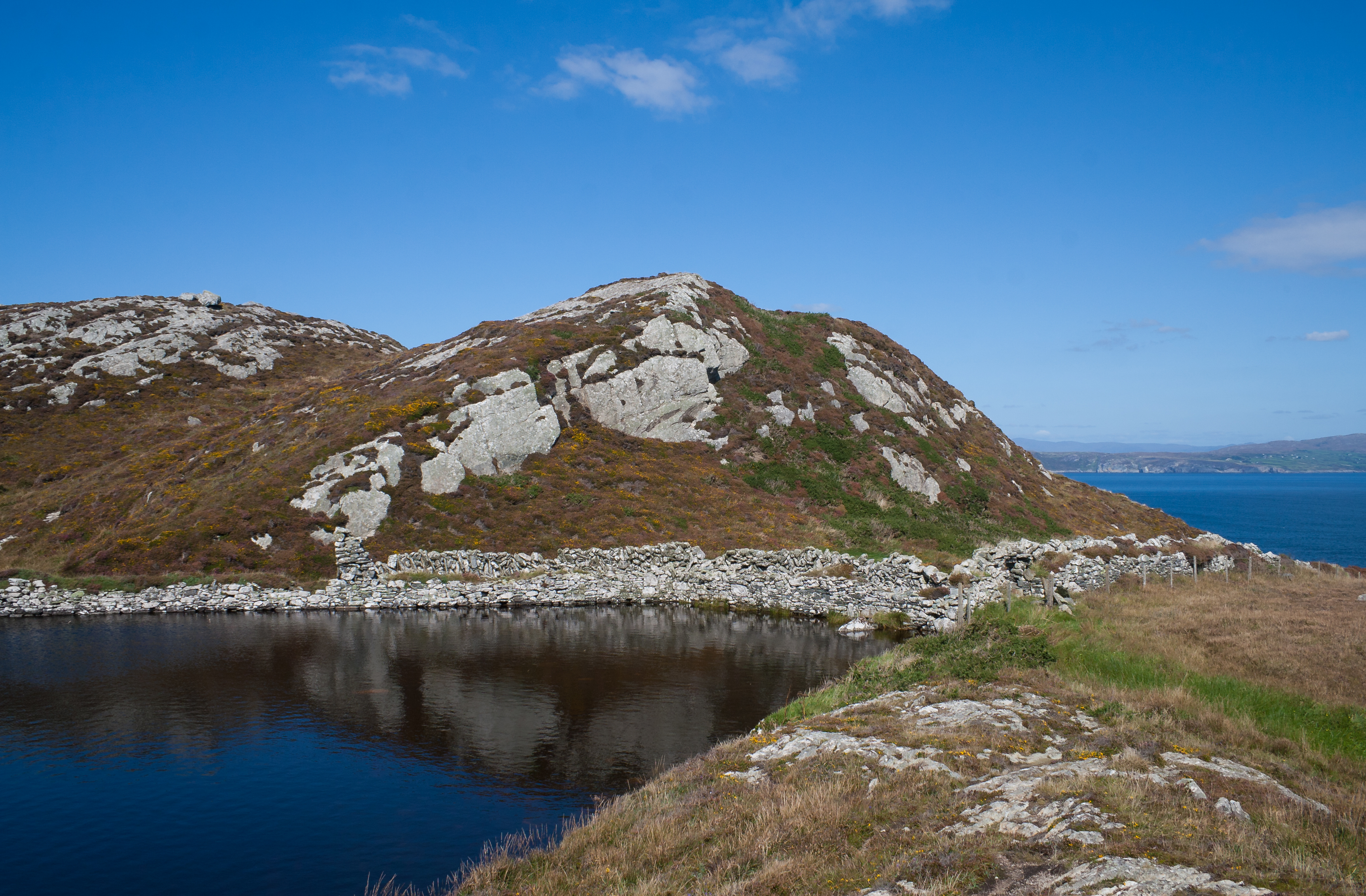
Wall at the eastern shore of Dun Lough

Dunlough Castle is a series of three fortified towers, or keeps, which stand almost invisibly upon the isthmus connecting “Three Castles Head” with the mainland. The only route of access is from the south across private farm land. The towers are connected by a wall spanning more than one hundred feet from the western cliffs to the shores of an apparently man-made lake. The wall is mostly fallen today; yet in places it stands approximately 15 feet (4.6 m). At the eastern shore of the lake, a wall from the same period serves as a dam, preventing the lake's water from pouring over the cliffs into Dunmanus Bay several hundred feet below. Passage around the eastern shore of the lake is awkward; while the castle and wall block the western shore. A small footpath between the westernmost ruins and the 400-foot (120 m) cliffs allows access to the towers and rocky cliffs beyond. As one writer has observed, "To an invading army, the cliff’s edge, the defensive wall, the lake and the sternly inaccessible approach would have made the castle appear impregnable". It is not known if Dunlough was ever attacked.

== History ==
At the time the first Norman soldiers and settlers arrived in Ireland in 1169, the O'Mahonys were the declining but still powerful princes of Eóganacht Raithlind, occupying approximately the area from Cork City west to Mizen Head. Their regional prominence had been diminished greatly since the MacCarthy dynasty had come south from Tipperary in the early 12th century, and faded even more rapidly as the Normans took hold of southern Ireland. Their primary Irish rivals (and allies) were the McCarthys and the O'Briens. But all these groups were militarily outclassed by the Normans who followed in the wake of King Henry II's initial invasion.

In 1177, King Henry of England granted "the kingdom of Cork" to the Cambro-Norman knights Robert Fitz-Stephen and Milo de Cogan. De Cogan received the lands of west Cork, and began a push toward the Atlantic which drove regional families from the holdings in central Cork. The O'Mahony clan, led by their chieftain Donagh "the Migrator", settled at the furthest point, the tip of the Mizen peninsula. The castle was not attacked, and the O'Mahony family remained there for 400 years until the castle was confiscated by the British crown in 1627.

== Architecture ==
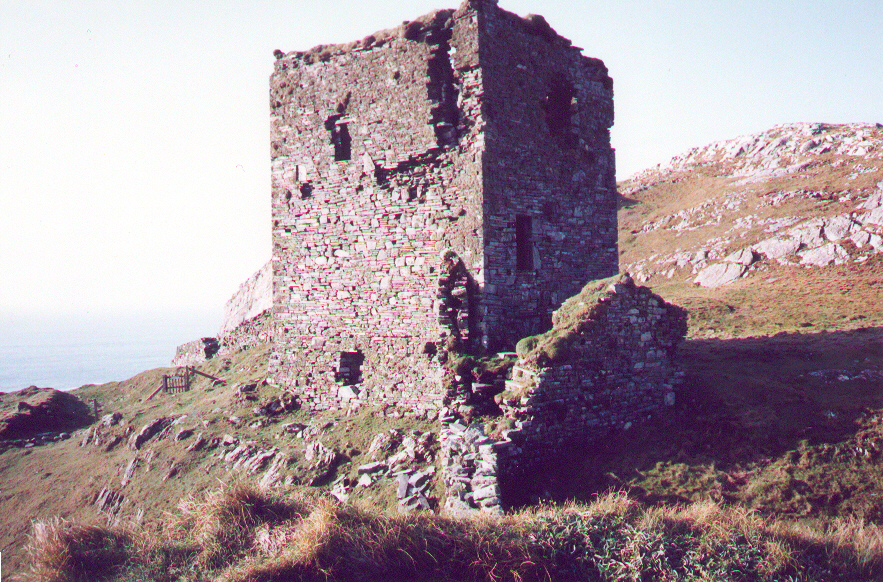
Western Tower

As an example of dry stone masonry, Dunlough is unusual in that it features three towers with distinct designs, each rather smaller than the typical solitary towers of the region. Designed to fit its environment, the three keeps and the connecting wall would have been a daunting target for invading armies, though it is unknown if any ever attempted to take the castle.

Each keep is three stories high, typical of rectangular towers of its day. No turrets or parapets are present among the remaining structure. The eastern keep was probably the gate tower, though the gateway itself is today in ruins. The western tower is the largest, and was most likely the residence for most of the inhabitants. Typical of "sub-towers" found in larger Norman castles, the central keep provided additional lookout and storage, and served to reinforce the strength of the connecting wall.

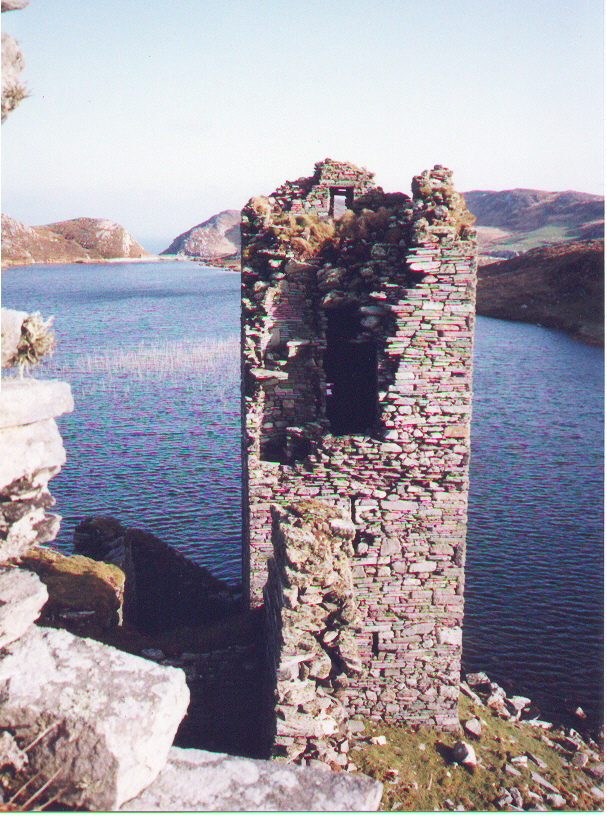
Eastern Tower

Dunlough's interior design is in keeping with other early Irish castles. The presence of a spiral staircase in the eastern tower is offset by the linear staircases of the western tower, while the central tower incorporates both types of stairs. The spiral stairs of the eastern tower are today visible from the outside, due to the crumbling of the outer walls. The simple, rectangular towers of Dunlough foreshadowed the regional castles which were built in later years, many of which still stand. Plain and unornamental, these castles, many of them O'Mahony keeps, rise from the landscape along both shores of the Mizen peninsula.

A common characteristic of the O'Mahony castles, evident at Dunlough's western keep, is the second-storey door. Usually directly above or just to the side of the first-storey entrance, the second-storey door was probably accessed by means of a removable wooden ladder. Inside, the door leads either forward to the second storey (commonly wooden) or upward through the wall to third level. The third storey at Dunlough, as at other O'Mahony castles, is a stone floor which served as the banquet and gathering hall. This was a common feature of most Norman keeps from the early period.

Dunlough's deterioration is attributable in part to the dry stone masonry used in its construction. This method is unusual for castles in this area, which, built in later years, made more use of wet mortar and sand. Yet the use of dry stone masonry was common in earlier Irish buildings.
