= William Mahoney =

William Mahoney may refer to:

- William Mahoney (mayor) (1869–1952), Irish-American mayor of St. Paul, Minnesota
- William Mahoney (footballer) (1885–1939), Australian rules footballer who played for the Geelong Football Club
- William Austin Mahoney (1871–1952), Canadian architect
- William B. Mahoney (1912–2004), U.S. journalist and writer who had a successful late-in-life second career as a substance-abuse counselor
- William F. Mahoney (1856–1904), U.S. Representative from Illinois
- Bill Mahoney (1939–2021), Canadian ice hockey player and coach
- William P. Mahoney Jr. (1916–2000), United States Ambassador to Ghana

== See also ==
- William Mahony (disambiguation)
