= Simon Mahoney =

British army officer, chef and author

- Born: Portsmouth, Hampshire
- Education: Plymouth, Lympestone, London, Aston, Leicester
- Occupations: former Royal Marine Officer, Senior social worker, writer, broadcaster, group worker
- Known for: First Catch Your Rabbit
- Children: Fiona Mahoney, Jaelith Mahoney, David Mahoney, Christopher Mahoney

Simon Mahoney is a former Royal Marines young officer, social work team leader, freelance artist and author.

== Career ==
He initially pursued his career as a junior officer with the Royal Marines in 1960s. He was diagnosed with uveitis in 2010 and had partially lost his eyesight at the age of 66. He lost his eyesight completely in 2018.

He wrote his first book as an autobiography titled A Descent into Darkness which is based on his life story and elaborates about how he overcame the challenges after losing his eyesight completely. He later pursued his career as a writer and developed an interest in cooking soon after the death of his wife who died due to the stroke during lockdown which was imposed as a result of the COVID-19 pandemic.

In 2020, he wrote his second book titled First Catch Your Rabbit which offers useful cooking tips for visually impaired and partially sighted people and blind, also to be found useful by widowers and students. The book was published as an e-book in the latter part of 2020. Simon wrote the book with the help of using a specially adapted PC and word-processing software which was provided by the Blind Veterans UK organisation.
