= Bryan Mahoney =

Bryan Mahoney may refer to:

- Big B (rapper), Bryan Mahoney, American rapper
- Bryan Mahoney, candidate in Wild Rose (electoral district)

== See also ==
- Brian Mahoney (disambiguation)
