= Chris Mahony =

New Zealand rugby union player

- Born: Christopher B. Mahony; 19 June 1981 (age 45) Auckland, New Zealand
- Height: 1.85 m (6 ft 1 in)
- Weight: 98 kg (216 lb)
- University: University of Otago; University of Oxford

Rugby union career
- Position: Fullback centre or wing
Senior career
Years	Team	Apps	(Points)
–	Auckland		

Chris Mahony (born 19 June 1981 in Auckland, New Zealand) is a former rugby union player for the Auckland Air New Zealand Cup team, playing fullback centre or wing. He played for Oxford University where he has completed a Masters in African Studies and a DPhil in Politics.

== Education ==
Mahony holds Bachelor of Commerce (B.Com.) and of Laws (LL.B.) degrees from the University of Otago, and a Master’s in African Studies (M.Sc.) and a D.Phil. in Politics from the University of Oxford.

He was admitted to the bar of the High Court of New Zealand in 2006 where he appeared for the Crown in criminal and refugee matters.

== Career ==
Mahony played for Auckland in the National Provincial Championship from 2006 to 2008. Auckland won the Air New Zealand Cup in 2007. He represented Oxford University, winning four Blues from 2006 to 2009. He also played for Coventry.

In 2003, Mahony drafted recommendations on governance and corruption for the Sierra Leone Truth and Reconciliation Commission. In 2008, he directed the Witness Evaluation Legacy Project at the Special Court for Sierra Leone. He taught international human rights and international criminal law while completing his doctorate at the University of Oxford. From 2012-2013, he was the deputy director of the New Zealand Centre for Human Rights Law, Policy and Practice at Auckland University, Faculty of Law.

From 2015 to 2018, Mahony worked for the United Nations Development Programme on Strategic Policy, Conflict Prevention, and Transitional Justice. In 2017, he taught law at Peking University.

Mahony was also a research fellow at the Centre for International Law Research and Policy and a visiting research fellow at Georgetown University Law Center. At the World Bank, he has worked in the Governance Global Practice, the Independent Evaluation Group, and the Finance Competitiveness and Innovation Global Practice. Chris Mahony is the co-founder and CEO of Peloria.

== Personal life ==
In 2017, Mahony was present at the Charlottesville, Virginia, car attack of a crowd of protesters. He was walking down the road together with Brennan Gilmore when the car was seen at the top of the hill before it came down. Mahony chased the car and alerted the police of the incident.

== Publications ==
BOOKS

- Morten Bergsmo, Mark Klamberg, Kjersti Lohne, and Chris Mahony (eds), Power in International Criminal Justice, Florence: Torkel Opsahl Academic EPublisher, 2020 (884 pp.).
- The Justice Sector Afterthought: Witness Protection in Africa, Pretoria: Institute for Security Studies, 2010. Cited by the United Nations Special Rapporteur on the promotion of truth, justice, reparation and guarantees of non-recurrence
- Kirsten Ainley, Rebekkah Freidman and Chris Mahony (eds). Evaluating Transitional Justice: Accountability and Peacebuilding in Post-Conflict Sierra Leone New York: Palgrave Macmillan 2015. Reviewed here and here. Cited by the joint UN-World Bank Report on Conflict prevention.
- Mary Crock, Farida Fozdar and Chris Mahony (guest eds), A ‘slippery fish’: The differential application of human rights obligations to the settlement of refugees in the ‘Group of Five’ States (Special Edition of) International Journal of Migration and Border Studies, (2017) (1).

BOOK CHAPTERS

- Development and National Prosecutions: Addressing Power and Exclusion for Sustainable Peace and Development in Bergsmo et al (eds) Power in International Criminal Justice, Florence: Torkel Opsahl Academic EPublisher, 2020 (649-868 pp.) (co-author with Djordje Djordjevic).
- Make the ICC Relevant: Aiding, Abetting, and Accessorizing as Aggravating Factors in Preliminary Examination, in Morten Bergsmo and Carsten Stahn (editors), Quality Control in Preliminary Examination: Volume 2, Torkel Opsahl Academic EPublisher, Brussels, 2018
- A Case Selection Independence Framework for Tracing Historical Interests’ Manifestation in International Criminal Justice, in Bergsmo and Wui Ling (eds) ‘The Historical Origins of International Criminal Law’ Torkel Opsahl Academic EPublisher, 2015. Cited by the joint UN-World Bank Report on Conflict prevention.
- If you’re not at the table, you’re on the menu: Complementarity and Self-Interest in Domestic Processes for Core International Crimes in Bergsmo (eds) ‘Military Self Interest in Accountability for Core International Crimes’, Torkel Opsahl Academic EPublisher, 2015
- Transitional Justice in Sierra Leone: Theory, History and Evaluation in Kirsten Ainley, Rebekka Freidman and Chris Mahony (eds). ‘Evaluating Transitional Justice: Accountability and Peacebuilding in Post-Conflict Sierra Leone’, New York: Palgrave Macmillan 2015 (co-author with Ainley and Friedman)
- A Political Tool? The Politics of Case Selection at the Special Court for Sierra Leone in Kirsten Ainley, Rebekka Freidman and Chris Mahony (eds). ‘Evaluating Transitional Justice: Accountability and Peacebuilding in Post- Conflict Sierra Leone’, New York: Palgrave Macmillan, 2015
- The Truth about the Truth: Insider Reflections on the TRC in Kirsten Ainley, Rebekka Freidman and Chris Mahony (eds). ‘Evaluating Transitional Justice: Accountability and Peacebuilding in Post-Conflict Sierra Leone’, New York: Palgrave Macmillan, 2015 (co-author with Yasmin Sooka). Cited by the joint UN-World Bank Report on Conflict prevention.
- The Potential and Politics of Transitional Justice: Interactions between the Global and the Local in Evaluations of Success in Kirsten Ainley, Rebekka Freidman and Chris Mahony (eds). ‘Evaluating Transitional Justice: Accountability and Peacebuilding in Post-Conflict Sierra Leone’, New York: Palgrave Macmillan, 2015 (co- author with Ainley and Friedman)
- Witness Sensitive Practices in International Fact-Finding Outside Criminal Justice: Lessons for Nepal in Morten Bergsmo (ed) Quality Control in Fact-Finding, Florence: Torkel Opsahl Academic EPublisher, 2013 (225-274). Reviewed in the European Journal of International Law. Cited by UN Special Rapporteur’s report to the Human Rights Council and by the joint UN-World Bank Report on Conflict prevention.
- Prioritising International Sex Crimes before the Special Court for Sierra Leone: Another Instrument of Political Manipulation? in Bergsmo (Eds) ‘International Sex Crimes as a Criminal Justice Theme’, Oslo: Torkel Opsahl Academic EPublisher, 2012. (p59-80). Reviews available here and here

JOURNAL ARTICLES AND ACADEMIC PAPERS

- Weighting Justice Reform Costs and Benefits Using Machine Learning and Modern Data Science. Policy Research Working Papers; 10449. © World Bank, Washington, DC. 2023, http://hdl.handle.net/10986/39832 License: CC BY 3.0 IGO.” (co-author)
- ‘A method and app for measuring the heterogeneous costs and benefits of justice processes’, Front. Psychol., 16 May 2023, Sec. Forensic and Legal Psychology, Volume 14 – 2023 | https://doi.org/10.3389/fpsyg.2023.1094303 (co-author)
- ‘The Relationship Between Influential Actors’ Language and Violence: A Kenyan Case Study Using Artificial Intelligence’, Background Paper, LSE-Oxford Commission on State Fragility, Growth and Development, International Growth Centre, 2019 (co-author).
- ‘Conflict Prevention and Guarantees of Non-Recurrence’, Background paper to the United Nations-World Bank Flagship Study on Development and Conflict Prevention (co-author) (forthcoming 2017).
- ‘International Criminal Justice Case Selection Independence: An ICJ barometer’ Brussels: Torkel Opsahl Academic EPublisher, FICHL Policy Brief Series No. 58 (2016).
- ‘The Justice Pivot: US International Criminal Law Influence from outside the ICC’, Georgetown Journal of International Law, 2015, 46(4).
- ‘Sierra Leone: The Justice v. Reconciliation Archetype?’ Brussels: Torkel Opsahl Academic EPublisher, FICHL Policy Brief Series No. 33 (2015).
- Chris Mahony, Jay Marlowe, Natalie Baird and Louise Humpage, ‘Aspirational yet precarious: New Zealand refugee settlement policy’s compliance with international human rights obligations’, in Mary Crock, Farida Fozdar and Chris Mahony (guest eds), A ‘slippery fish’: The differential application of human rights obligations to the settlement of refugees in the ‘Group of Five’ States (Special Edition of) International Journal of Migration and Border Studies, (2017) (1).
- Mary Crock, Farida Fozdar and Chris Mahony, ‘Introduction’, in Mary Crock, Farida Fozdar and Chris Mahony, (guest editors) A ‘slippery fish’: The differential application of human rights obligations to the settlement of refugees in the ‘Group of Five’ States (Special Edition of) International Journal of Migration and Border Studies (2017) (1).
- Where Politics Borders Law: The Malawi-Tanzania Boundary Dispute, New Zealand Centre for Human Rights, Africa Working Paper Series, February 2014 (co-author)
- Review of ‘Rescuing a Fragile State: Sierra Leone 2002–2008’ edited by L. Gberie Waterloo, Ontario: Wilfrid Laurier University Press, 2009.’ Journal of Modern African Studies, 50 (3) 2012. (review)
- Addressing Corruption in Post Conflict Sierra Leone, Governance Review, CGG, June 2006.

POLICY BRIEFS, POLICY REPORTS, BOOK REVIEWS

- “From Justice for the Past to Peace and Inclusion for the Future: A Development Approach to Transitional Justice”, UNDP, 2020 (co-author).
- “AI can help trace language to violence”, World Bank Blog, 2021 (co-author).
- “Machine learning in Uganda brings the power of risk financing to strengthen refugee and host community resilience” Nasikaliza Blog, The World Bank, 2021 (co-author).
- “Transitional Justice, the Rule of Law, and Conflict Recurrence” Development for Peace Blog, The World Bank, 2018 (co-author).
- “United Nations; World Bank. 2017. Pathways for Peace: Inclusive Approaches to Preventing Violent Conflict. Washington, DC: World Bank (contributing author).
- Towards the transformative: 3rd Generation Rule of Law Reform to manage political risk, United Nations Development Program, forthcoming.
- ‘International Criminal Justice Case Selection Independence: An ICJ barometer’ Brussels: Torkel Opsahl Academic EPublisher, FICHL Policy Brief Series No. 58 (2016).
- ‘Sierra Leone: The Justice v. Reconciliation Archetype?’ Brussels: Torkel Opsahl Academic EPublisher, FICHL Policy Brief Series No. 33 (2015).
- Where Politics Borders Law: The Malawi-Tanzania Boundary Dispute, New Zealand Centre for Human Rights, Africa Working Paper Series, February 2014 (co-author).
- Chris Mahony, Meghan Bolwell, Hannah Clark and Lee-Lon Wong, Comparative Analysis of International Refugee Resettlement International Law Obligations and Policy, A report on the WUN conference held at the University of Auckland, December 2013.
- Ainley, Kirsten, Datzberger, Simone, Friedman, Rebekka and Mahony, Chris (eds.) (2013) Ten years on: transitional justice in post conflict Sierra Leone: report and analysis of a conference held at Goodenough College, London. In: International Relations Public Conference: Ten Years On: Sierra Leone’s Post-Conflict Transition, 11 December 2012, Goodenough College, London, UK.
- Review of ‘Rescuing a Fragile State: Sierra Leone 2002–2008’ edited by L. Gberie Waterloo, Ontario: Wilfrid Laurier University Press, 2009.’ Journal of Modern African Studies, 50 (3) 2012. (review)
- Outreach Strategy for War Crimes Division of High Court of Uganda, OTJR, 2009 (co-author)
- Recommendations on Governance in ‘Witness to Truth: Report of the Sierra Leone Truth and Reconciliation Commission’, Volume 2, Accra: Graphic Packaging Ltd 2004
- The Historical Antecedents to the Conflict in ‘Witness to Truth: Report of the Sierra Leone Truth and Reconciliation Commission’, Volume 3A, Accra: Graphic Packaging Ltd 2004 (co-author)
