= Patrick Mahoney =

Irish recipient of the Victoria Cross

- Born: c. 1827; Waterford, Ireland
- Died: 30 October 1857 (aged 29–30); Lucknow, British India
- Military career
- Allegiance: United Kingdom
- Branch: Madras Army
- Rank: Sergeant
- Units: 1st Madras European Fusiliers
- Conflicts: Indian Mutiny
- Awards: Victoria Cross

Patrick Mahoney VC (c. 1827 – 30 October 1857) was an Irish recipient of the Victoria Cross, the highest and most prestigious award for gallantry in the face of the enemy that can be awarded to British and Commonwealth forces.

== Details ==
He was about 30 years old, and a sergeant in the 1st Madras European Fusiliers (later The Royal Dublin Fusiliers), Madras Army during the Indian Mutiny when the following deed took place for which he was awarded the VC:

For distinguished gallantry (whilst doing duty with the Volunteer Cavalry) in aiding in the capture of the Regimental Colour of the 1st Regiment Native Infantry, at Mungulwar, on the 21st of September, 1857.

(Extract from Field Force Orders of the late Major-General Havelock, dated 17 October 1857.)

He was killed in action at Lucknow, India, on 30 October 1857.
