= Cynthia L. Mahoney =

Episcopalian nun and former chaplain in New York City

- Born: November 15, 1951; Camden, South Carolina, U.S.
- Died: November 1, 2006 (aged 54); Aiken, South Carolina, U.S.

Cynthia L. Mahoney (also known as Sister Cindy Mahoney) (November 15, 1951 – November 1, 2006) was an Episcopalian nun and chaplain in New York City who was present at "Ground Zero" following the terrorist attacks of September 11, 2001.

== Work at Ground Zero ==
"She worked in the pit after 9/11 with the fatality team, and worked as an EMT and assisted the New York City Coroner's Office during and in the aftermath of the disaster. She spent six months at New York City's Ground Zero site ... she blessed human remains pulled from the smoldering debris of Ground Zero, prayed with the workers who painstakingly combed the rubble each day and comforted relatives of the dead when they visited the site" (as per and also her obituary in the Associated Press).

== Death ==
Mahoney died, aged 54, on November 1, 2006, at her Aiken, South Carolina, home. She had been suffering from asthma, reactive airways dysfunction syndrome, chronic obstructive pulmonary disease and gastroesophageal reflux disease; she believed that the cause of these ailments was her exposure to toxic substances at "Ground Zero". Sister Cindy summoned David Worby, the lawyer representing thousands of ailing "Ground Zero" workers, to her Aiken, South Carolina, hospice and requested that he act as her guardian and fulfill her dying wish by overseeing her autopsy after she's gone ... [she suffered] post-traumatic stress syndrome, Worby said. She had witnessed WTC victims burn or jump to their deaths, and prayed over countless human remains ... Mahoney asked that results of her autopsy be used in any class-action lawsuit filed by ground zero workers who say the air around the site has sickened them.
