= Jerry Mahoney (umpire) =

American baseball umpire (1860-1947)

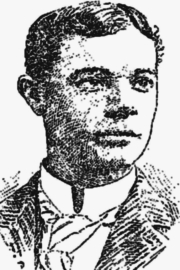
- Born: Michael Jeremiah Mahoney; December 19, 1860; Lowell, Massachusetts, U.S.
- Died: April 1, 1947 (aged 86); Lowell, Massachusetts, U.S.
- Occupation: Umpire
- Years active: 1891 (AA), 1892 (NL)
- Employer(s): American Association, National League

Michael Jeremiah "Jerry" Mahoney (December 19, 1860 – April 1, 1947) was an American professional baseball umpire.

Mahoney umpired 49 American Association games in 1891, and he umpired 16 National League games the following year in 1892, all of them as the lone umpire.
