= Francis Mahoney =

Francis Mahoney may refer to:

- Francis Mahoney (basketball), American basketball player
- Francis J. Mahoney, American lawyer and politician from New York
- Francis X. Mahoney, American politician, member of the Illinois House of Representatives

== See also ==
- Francis Sylvester Mahony, Irish humorist and journalist
- Frank P. Mahony (Francis Prout Mahony), Australian painter, watercolorist and illustrator
