= Beck-Mahoney Sorceress =

Type of aircraft

Sorceress
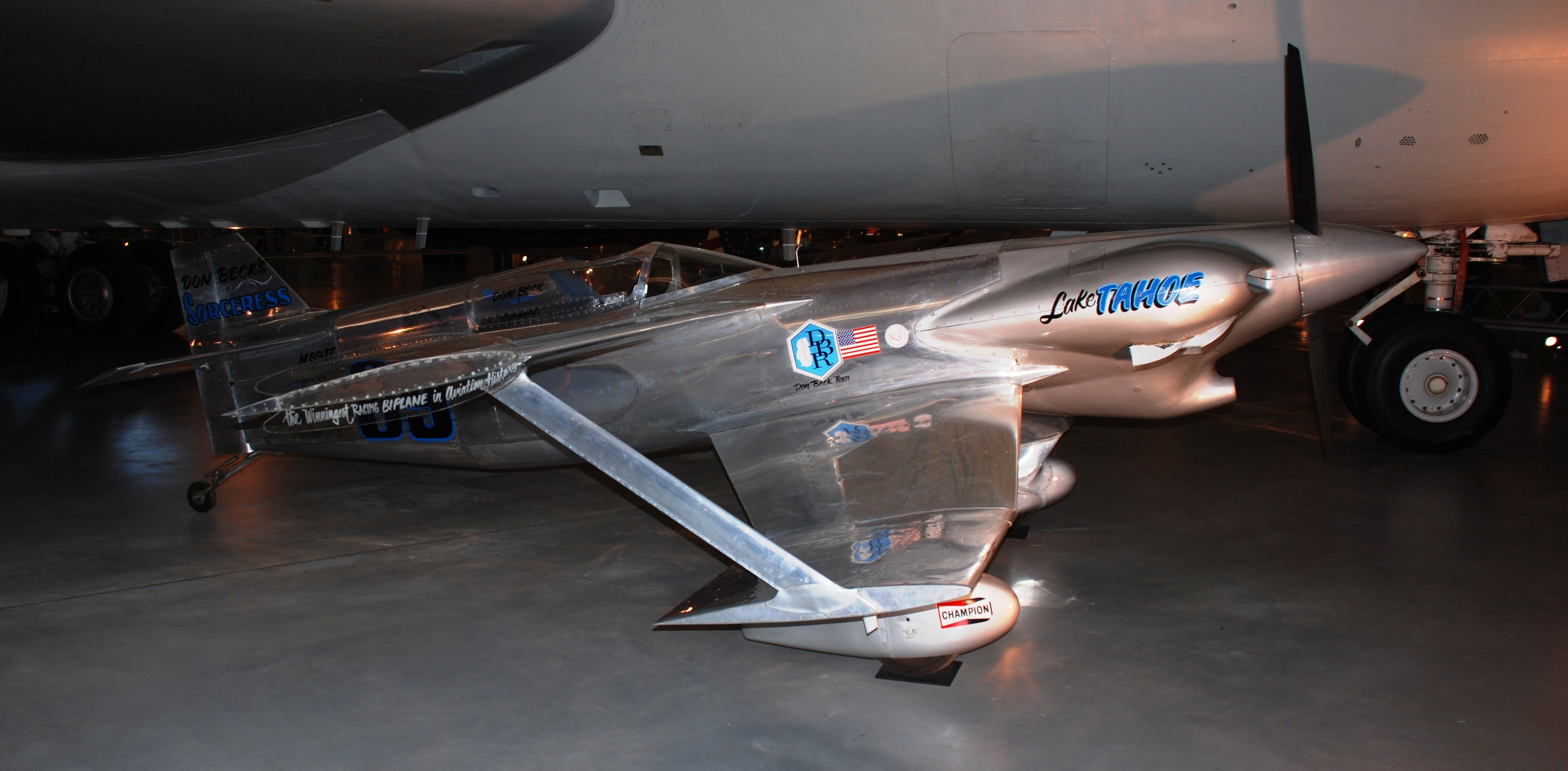

General information
- Type: Racing biplane
- National origin: United States
- Designer: Lee and Seldon Mahoney
- Status: Preserved at the Steven F. Udvar-Hazy Center
- Number built: 1

History
- Introduction date: 1970
- Retired: 1983

The Beck-Mahoney Sorceress is a racing staggerwing biplane originally designed by the father and son team of Lee and Seldon Mahoney with later improvements accomplished by pilot Don Beck.

The aircraft is notable as being the first biplane to exceed 200 mph (320 km/h) on a race pylon course and also held the distinction of being the most successful racing biplane in history, until Tom Aberle's Phantom, which has won eight Reno Gold championships since its introduction in 2004. It was donated to the Smithsonian National Air and Space Museum after its last race, where it is currently housed in the Steven F. Udvar-Hazy Center in Chantilly, Virginia.

== Design ==
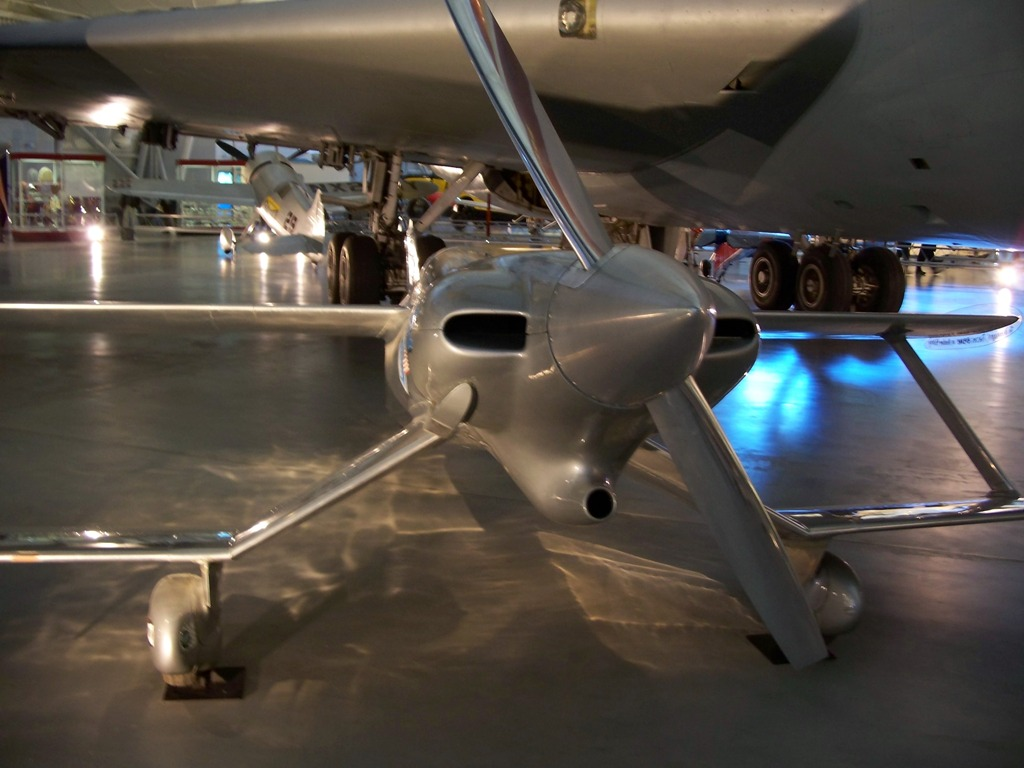
Front view

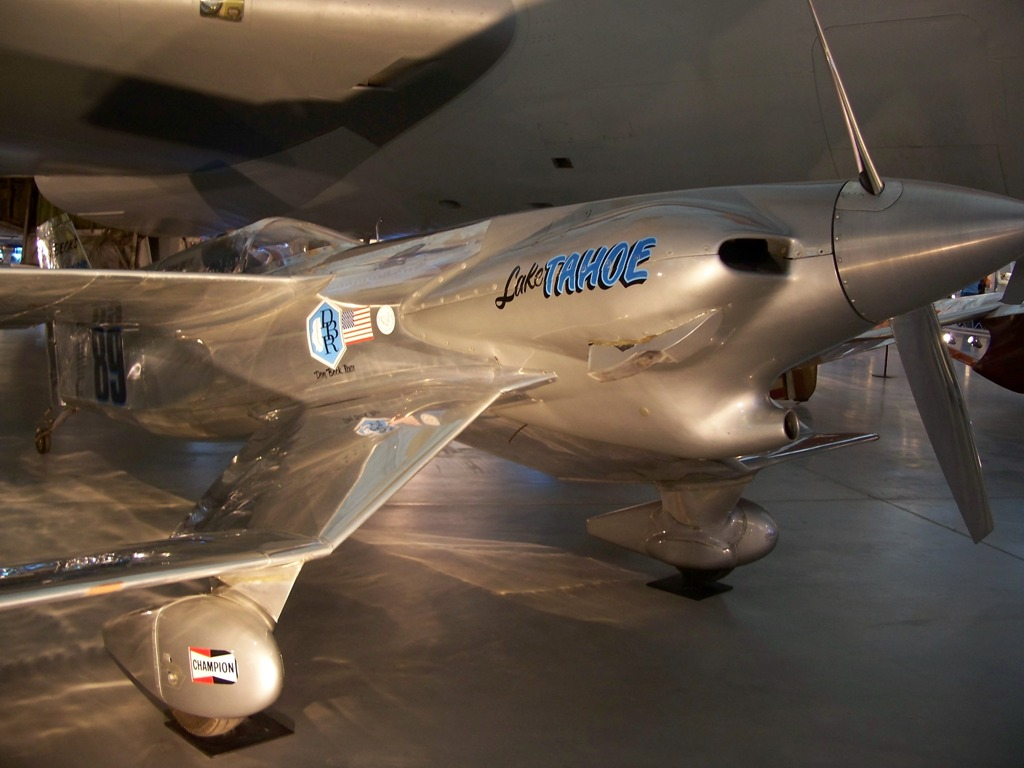
Front three quarter view

A reverse-stagger biplane, Sorceress represents the state of the art at the time of its design and remains one of the great design classics of air-racing within the United States.

Lee Mahoney, the designer, had experience in airframe construction with composite materials, metal-to-composite bonding technologies, and computational fluid dynamics, applying his experience to design Sorceress, and achieve success with several noteworthy design features, including: Use of engine exhaust air flow forms a Coandă effect-bonded laminar flow over the fuselage, increasing rudder efficiency by several orders of magnitude. Mahoney had originally designed the fuselage so that a fin would not be necessary - the fuselage would have ended with a rudder, but his partners however preferred a more conventional treatment, giving Sorceress one of the smallest conventional fins of any racing biplane to date. The aerofoil sections of the wings are designed as mirror image 'vanes' of symmetrical section - they interfere with each other's flow in a manner which provides very high efficiency in turns, whereas one vane-set/wing begins to lose efficiency, the other gains more, allowing for extremely high lift in turns with minimal loss of velocity Sorceress gains a great deal from composite bonding, with one of the first airframes to demonstrate almost perfect streamlining combined with very great strength; the wing interplane struts are for show only, Sorceress being capable of flight without them, but racing rules require them.

== Controversy ==
Sorceress was designed within the rules of the ARPA Biplane class of 1965 and conformed to them without deviation, however, by 1972 competitors lobbied successfully to have Sorceress banned from competition.

Items of contention included: The original configuration used a limited model of the Teledyne Continental O-360, a commonplace engine, but oil sump configuration and the use of electronic ignition failed scrutiny checks. The original undercarriage suffered collapse on several occasions and the Sorceress team were instructed to improve the undercarriage with stronger struts and larger wheels. The wing area of the original wings was deemed excessive and had to be reduced. The lower wing outboard of the interplane struts was removed and swash-plates fitted to the tips.

Lee Mahoney took a lot of these criticisms, rule changes and comments personally, speaking about his experiences in an interview with 'Air Progress' magazine:

Not withstanding the negative early experiences, Sorceress retains her claim to being the most technologically advanced biplane of any sort ever constructed, and her racing history subsequent to the controversy has gone on to prove the faith and skill of her designer, backers, and pilots.

== Results and records ==
Sorceress placed in the following Reno Air Races, racing as #89:

- 1970: Biplane Consolation, 7th place, 152.380 mph (245.232 km/h), pilot: Lee Mahoney (crossed the finish line first, but automatically moved to last as it was racing as a fill-in).
- 1971: Biplane Gold, 2nd place, 175.290 mph (282.102 km/h), pilot: Paul Deschamps
- 1972: Biplane Gold, 1st place, 189.723 mph (305.330 km/h), pilot: Don Beck
- 1973: Biplane Gold, 2nd place, 184.620 mph (297.117 km/h), pilot: Don Beck
- 1974: Biplane Gold, 2nd place, 191.530 mph (308.238 km/h), pilot: Don Beck
- 1975: Biplane Gold, 1st place, 198.990 mph (320.243 km/h), pilot: Don Beck
- 1976: Biplane Gold, 1st place, 202.153 mph (325.334 km/h), pilot: Don Beck
- 1980: Biplane Gold, 8th place, 210.730 mph (339.137 km/h), pilot: Don Beck (crossed finish first, disqualified for illegal passing)
- 1982: Biplane Gold, 3rd place, 206.290 mph (331.992 km/h), pilot: Don Beck
- 1983: Biplane Gold, 2nd place, 202.350 mph (325.651 km/h), pilot: Don Beck

Sorceress set a number of speed records in the Sport Biplane Class, including:

- 190.48 mph, qualifying heat record, 1970 Reno Air Races
- 189.723 mph, championship race record, 1972 Reno Air Races
- 202.153 mph, championship race record, 1976 Reno Air Races

== Specifications ==
Data from Jane's All The World's Aircraft 1971–72

General characteristics

- Crew: 1
- Length: 17 ft 0 in (5.18 m)
- Wingspan: 16 ft 0 in (4.88 m)
- Wing area: 98 sq ft (9.1 m^{2})
- Empty weight: 698 lb (317 kg)
- Max takeoff weight: 1,110 lb (503 kg)
- Fuel capacity: 45 US gal (37 imp gal; 170 L)
- Powerplant: 1 × Lycoming O-290-3 4-cylinder air-cooled horizontally-opposed piston engine, 125 hp (93 kW)

Performance

- Maximum speed: 202 mph (325 km/h, 176 kn)
- Range: 1,199 mi (1,930 km, 1,042 nmi)
- Rate of climb: 1,495 ft/min (7.59 m/s)
