= William Mahony =

William Mahony may refer to:

- William Mahony (politician, born 1877) (1877–1962), member of the Australian House of Representatives, 1915–1927
- William Mahony (New South Wales politician) (1856–1918), member of the New South Wales Legislative Assembly, 1894–1910
- William Mahony (bishop) (1919–1994), Bishop of the Roman Catholic Diocese of Ilorin
- Bill Mahony (William Victor Mahony, born 1949), Canadian Olympic swimmer

== See also ==
- William Mahoney (disambiguation)
