= Jeremiah Mahoney (Medal of Honor) =

- Born: 1840
- Died: November 24, 1902 (aged 61–62)
- Burial place: Holy Cross Cemetery and Mausoleum; Malden, Massachusetts
- Military career
- Allegiance: United States of America; Union
- Branch: United States Army; Union Army
- Rank: Sergeant
- Units: Company A, 29th Massachusetts Volunteer Infantry Regiment
- Conflicts: American Civil War
- Awards: Medal of Honor

Jeremiah Mahoney (1840 – November 11, 1902) was a Sergeant in the United States Army and a Medal of Honor recipient for capturing the flag of the 17th Mississippi Infantry at the Battle of Fort Sanders along with two other men.

Mahoney is buried in Holy Cross Cemetery and Mausoleum Malden, Massachusetts.

== Medal of Honor citation ==
Rank and organization: Sergeant, Company A, 29th Massachusetts Infantry. Place and date: At Fort Sanders, Knoxville, Tenn., November 29, 1863. Entered service at. Fall River, Mass. Birth: ------. Date of issue: December 1, 1864.

Citation:

Capture of flag of 17th Mississippi Infantry (C.S.A.).

== See also ==
- List of Medal of Honor recipients
- List of American Civil War Medal of Honor recipients: M–P
