= Bruce–Mahoney Trophy =

Trophy

Bruce-Mahoney Trophy
- St. Ignatius Wildcats Sacred Heart Cathedral Fightin' Irish
- Sports: Football, Volleyball, Men's and Women's Basketball, Baseball
- First meeting: October 1945; St. Ignatius, 20–6 (Football)
- Latest meeting: September 25, 2026; St. Ignatius, 24-7 (Football)
- Next meeting: October 6, 2026 (Girls Volleyball)
- Stadiums: Kezar Stadium, USF War Memorial, McCullough Gymnasium, Sobrato Center, Chase Center, Oracle Park
- Trophy: Bruce-Mahoney Trophy

Statistics
- All-time series: St. Ignatius Leads, 57–20–3 (.731)
- Longest win streak: St. Ignatius, 12 (1974–1985)
- Current win streak: St. Ignatius, 5 (2021–present)

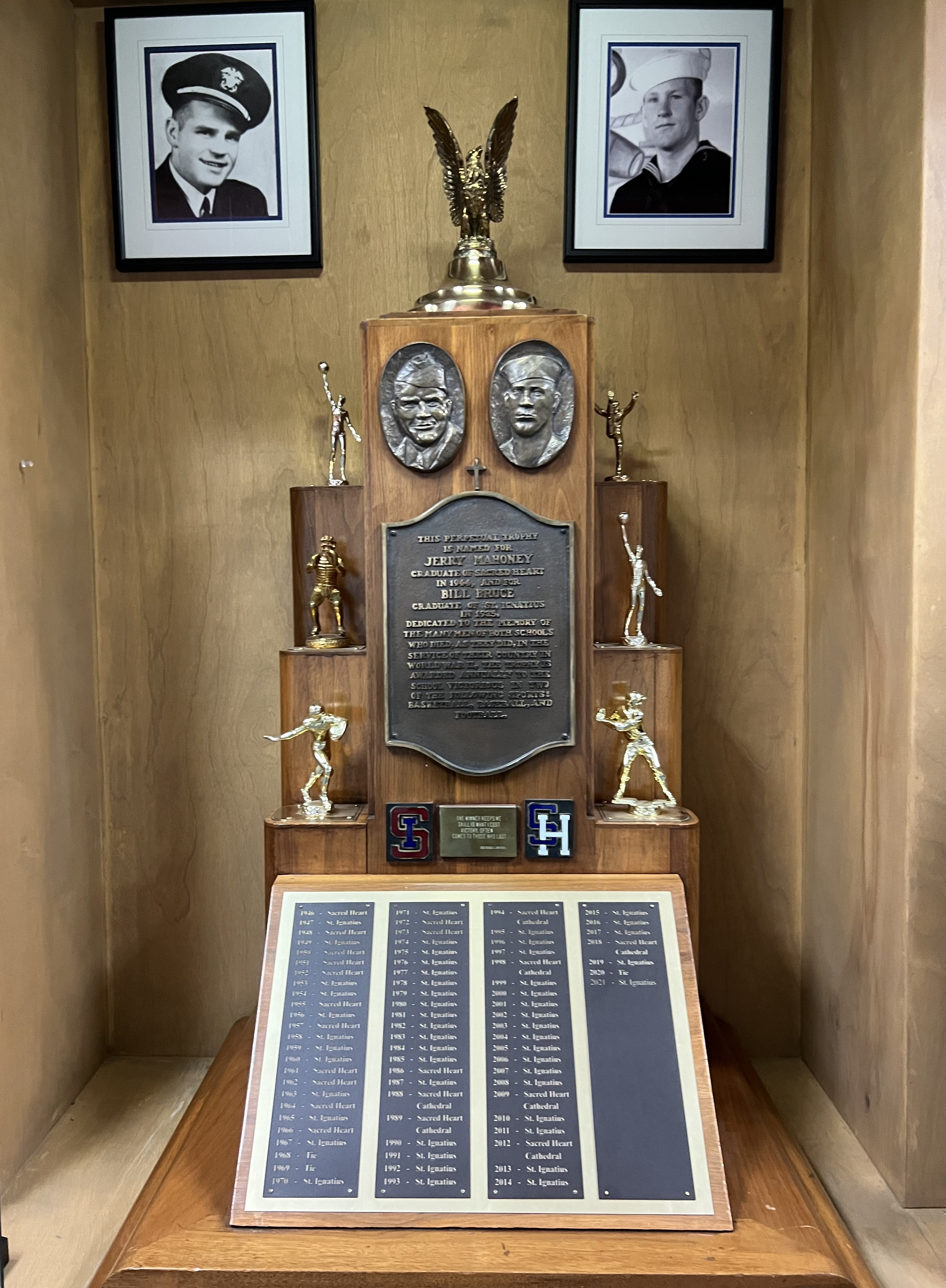
The Bruce–Mahoney Trophy

The Bruce–Mahoney Trophy is a trophy awarded annually to the winner of an annual sports competition series between Sacred Heart Cathedral Preparatory and St. Ignatius College Preparatory in San Francisco, California. The two Catholic high schools are longtime cross-town rivals. Although the athletic rivalry between the schools first began with a St. Patrick's Day rugby game in 1893, and is the oldest high school rivalry west of the Rocky Mountains and the oldest Catholic School rivalry in the nation, the Trophy, in its 78th year and named in honor of an alumnus of each school — Bill Bruce and Jerry Mahoney, both of whom were killed in World War II — was inaugurated in 1947, with its first "awarding" retroactive to the end of WWII and the 1945-46 season.

The two schools play against each other in football, boys basketball, baseball, and as of 2021, girls volleyball and basketball. In basketball and baseball, where the teams play more than one game per season, only the first game counts towards winning the Trophy. The Trophy is awarded to the school that wins three out of the five games.

St. Ignatius has won the Trophy a total of 57 times and Sacred Heart Cathedral has won the Trophy 20 times through 2025–2026. There have been three years (1967–68, 1968–69 and 2019–20) when the Trophy was not contested and the result was recorded as a "Tie," with the Trophy retained by its then-current holder (St. Ignatius in all three cases). The longest period of time either school has held the trophy is 12 years, by St. Ignatius (1974–1985).

Although the schools had been rivals since the late 1800s, the Bruce–Mahoney Trophy was not inaugurated until 1947, and at the time only consisted of boys sports (both schools were all-boys institutions until the late 20th century). In 2021, SI and SH announced that starting with the 2021–2022 athletic season, the Trophy would be determined by both boys and girls sports, in a best-of-five format with the inclusion of girls volleyball and girls basketball.

St. Ignatius College Preparatory is the current holder of the trophy, winning it in the 2025–26 season.

== Bill Bruce ==
Lieutenant Bill Bruce (class of 1935) was an alumnus of St. Ignatius. He excelled in both academics and athletics, especially football. He participated in many extracurricular activities, including serving as president of the student body.

He enlisted in the United States Navy at the outbreak of World War II. After flying more than 50 combat missions in Europe, he was killed on April 14, 1943, in an airplane crash while training new pilots at the Naval Air Station in Pasco, Washington.

== Jerry Mahoney ==
Seaman First Class Jerry Mahoney (class of 1944) was an alumnus of Sacred Heart. He excelled in football and basketball, earning All-City honors in both sports during his senior year.

He enlisted in the United States Navy after graduation. He was killed on February 5, 1945, when the merchant ship on which he was serving, the SS Henry B. Plant, was sunk by a German U-boat off the coast of Ramsgate, Kent.

== Football winners ==
Through 2026–27, St. Ignatius has won a total of 66 games while Sacred Heart has won 30 with 7 ties since the inaugural game in 1893. This year's game, held at Kezar Stadium, was won by SI 24-7.

== Basketball winners ==
In boys basketball, St. Ignatius has won 45 games while Sacred Heart has won 26. SI won this year's contest, held at USF's War Memorial Gym, 72-42.

In girls basketball, St. Ignatius has won three games and Sacred Heart has won two. SI won this year's contest, held at USF's War Memorial Gym, 61-43.

== Baseball winners ==
Records are not available for years where the other two games had already been won by the same school in that academic year. In years for which records are available, St. Ignatius has won 19 games while Sacred Heart has won 15. St. Ignatius won the most recent game 6-3, in the Spring of 2025, to complete a 5-sport sweep over Sacred Heart for the 2024-2025 season. The 2026 game is yet to be scheduled.

== Volleyball winners ==
St. Ignatius has won five matches, while Sacred Heart has won zero. In the most recent match on September 23, 2025, St. Ignatius beat Sacred Heart 3 sets to 2.
