= Rosemary Mahoney =

American writer (born 1961)

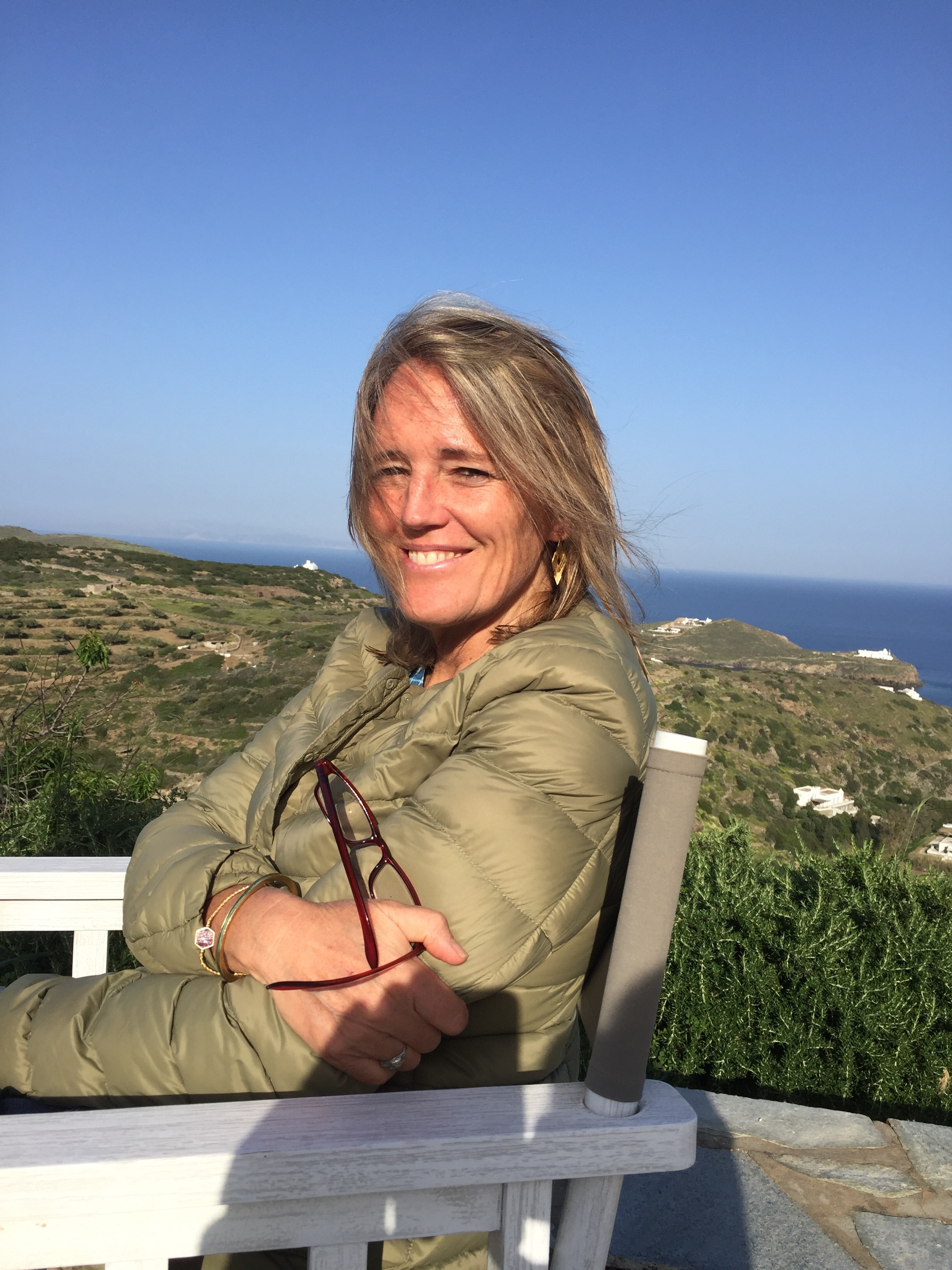
Rosemary Mahoney

Rosemary Mahoney (born January 28, 1961 Boston, Massachusetts) is an American writer. She has published six books of narrative non-fiction and numerous magazine articles. For the American Spectator, Christopher Caldwell wrote, "Mahoney has an effortlessly pretty prose style and an uncanny eye . . . . a literary talent that amounts to brilliance."

Mahoney grew up in Milton, Massachusetts, and graduated from St. Paul's School (Concord, New Hampshire), Harvard College (1983), and Johns Hopkins University (1985). She is a citizen of the United States and Ireland and lives in Greece. She has taught at Hangzhou University in the People's Republic of China and at The Johns Hopkins University. She worked briefly for Lillian Hellman.

Mahoney has been awarded numerous awards for her writing, including a Guggenheim Fellowship, a grant from the National Endowment for the Arts, a Whiting Writers Award, a nomination for the National Book Critics’ Circle Award, and Harvard's Charles Edmund Horman Prize for creative writing. She is the author of six books of non-fiction: The Early Arrival of Dreams: A Year in China, a New York Times Notable Book; Whoredom in Kimmage: The World of Irish Women, a National Book Critics Circle Award finalist; A Likely Story: One Summer with Lillian Hellman; The Singular Pilgrim: Travels on Sacred Ground; Down the Nile: Alone in a Fisherman's Skiff, and For the Benefit of Those Who See: Dispatches from the World of the Blind.

Her travelogue, Down the Nile; Alone in a Fisherman’s Skiff, was among the National Book Critics' Circle's Best Books of 2007 and was selected by writer Jan Morris for Conde Nast Traveller’s list of the 86 best travel books of all time. Mahoney's For the Benefit of Those Who See: Dispatches from the World of the Blind, is based on her experiences teaching at the Braille Without Borders schools for the blind in both Lhasa, Tibet and Kerala, India.

Mahoney has written for numerous publications, including The New York Times, The Washington Post, the London Observer, The New York Times Book Review, the Los Angeles Times, National Geographic Traveler, O, The Oprah Magazine, The Wall Street Journal, the Chicago Tribune, and The New York Times Magazine.

She has attended Yaddo.

== Awards ==
· Guggenheim Fellowship

· Whiting Writer's Award

· National Book Critics' Circle Award Nomination

· Freedom Forum Fellowship, Corporation of Yaddo

· National Endowment for the Arts Grant

· Charles Edmund Horman Prize for Creative Writing, Harvard College

· Transatlantic Review Award

== Works ==
- The Early Arrival of Dreams: A Year in China. Fawcett Columbine. 1990. ISBN 978-0449905524. (Reprinted by Houghton Mifflin, 2003. ISBN 978-0618035496)
- Whoredom in Kimmage: Irish Women Coming of Age. Houghton Mifflin, 1993. ISBN 978-0-395-60201-0.
- A Likely Story: One Summer with Lillian Hellman. Doubleday, 1998. ISBN 978-0-385-47793-2.
- The Singular Pilgrim: Travels on Sacred Ground. Houghton Mifflin Harcourt. 2004. ISBN 978-0-618-44665-0. "rosemary mahoney."
- Down the Nile: Alone in a Fisherman's Skiff. Hachette. 2007. ISBN 978-0-316-10745-7.
- For the Benefit of Those Who See: Dispatches from the World of the Blind. Little, Brown. 2014. ISBN 978-0-316-04342-7.
