= Charles Mahoney =

Charles Mahoney may refer to:

- Charles Mahoney (martyr) (c. 1640–1679), Irish priest and Catholic martyr
- Charles Mahoney (artist) (1903–1968), English artist
- Charles H. Mahoney (1886–1966), American politician, attorney and businessman
- John Mahoney (Charles John Mahoney, 1940–2018), English-American actor
