= Dennis Mahony =

Irish American newspaper editor

Dennis Aloysius Mahony
- Born: January 20, 1821; Rosscarbery, County Cork, Ireland
- Died: November 6, 1879 (aged 58)

Dennis Aloysius Mahony (January 20, 1821, in Rosscarbery, County Cork, Ireland – November 6, 1879) was one of the founders of the Dubuque Herald (now the Telegraph Herald), a newspaper in Dubuque, Iowa, during the American Civil War.

== Biography ==
Mahony was born in Rosscarbery, County Cork, Ireland. At the age of nine, he emigrated with his family to Philadelphia, Pennsylvania, in 1831. He studied theology and law before moving to Iowa in 1843, but initially held several other jobs (teaching, postmaster, justice of the peace) before being admitted to the bar in 1847.

He was elected to the Iowa House of Representatives from Jackson County in 1848 and in 1858. In 1849 he became editor of The Miner's Express; and in 1852 he co-founded the Dubuque Herald, the first daily paper in Iowa. Mahony was also active in regional politics.

=== Civil War ===
Mahony was a highly partisan Northern Democrat of Copperhead sympathies and wrote articles which negatively criticized Abraham Lincoln and the conduct of the Civil War. He was arrested on August 14, 1862, by U.S. Marshal H.M. Hoxie for publishing an editorial article that was allegedly disloyal to the government. He was transported from Dubuque to Washington, D.C., and held at the Old Capitol Prison. He was released from prison on November 10, but only after signing a document stating that he would "form an allegiance to the United States, and would not bring any charges against those who had arrested and confined him."

During his captivity, he was the Democratic nominee for Congress; he was defeated by William B. Allison. He would later serve two terms as sheriff of Dubuque County.

Mahony wrote a book about his experience entitled Prisoner of State which was published in 1863. He, Stilson Hutchins, and John Hodnett established the St. Louis Star newspaper in 1866, but Mahony sold his share and returned to Dubuque, where he edited the Dubuque Telegraph until his death.

He is buried at St. Patrick's Cemetery in Garryowen, Iowa, in the northwest corner of Jackson County, a few miles south of Bernard, Iowa.

== See also ==
- Clement Vallandigham
