= Dean Lake =

Dean Lake or Deans Lake may refer to:

- Dean Lake (Annapolis), a lake in Nova Scotia
- Dean Lake (Colchester), a lake in Nova Scotia
- Dean Lake, Ontario
- Dean Lake, Minnesota, an unorganized territory
- Dean Lake (Crow Wing County, Minnesota), a lake in Minnesota
- Dean Lake (Wright County, Minnesota), a lake in Minnesota
- Deans Lake (Minnesota), a lake in Scott County
- Dean Lake (Montana), a lake in Montana
- Dean Lake (Duchesne County, Utah)
