= Dan Mahoney (journalist) =

American journalist (1916–1999)

Dan Mahoney (1916–1999) was an Irish-American journalist who was investigated in the 1950s by Joseph McCarthy and James Eastland for possible communist activities and party membership.

Born in County Cork, Ireland, Mahoney emigrated to the United States with his family when he was nine. He went to work as a copy boy for the New York Daily Mirror, a Hearst-owned publication, when he was still in his teens and organized there for the Newspaper Guild, as did his brother and fellow-journalist William B. Mahoney. Dan Mahoney worked at the Mirror for nearly 22 years (with time out to serve in the Army during World War II).

In June 1955 journalist Winston Burdett went before the Senate Internal Security Subcommittee and fingered numerous other members of the media as potential communists. One of a number that he implicated was Mahoney. Mahoney received his subpoena in November 1955 and testified the following January in the same set of hearings at which National Guardian co-founders John T. McManus and James Aronson also testified.

At the hearing he testified that he was not presently a communist and denied ever having committed "any subversive act". When queried further, about past membership in the party, he cited the Fifth Amendment and refused to answer the subcommittee's questions. The next day the Mirror fired Mahoney.

He went on to work as a writer and editor for publications of the Hotel and Restaurant Workers Union and, subsequently, as a small-business owner in a suburb of New York City and in the U.S. Virgin Islands and then as an actor in Cork, Ireland. He finally settled in Oakland, California, where he died in 1999.
