= Winston Burdett =

American journalist (1913–1993)

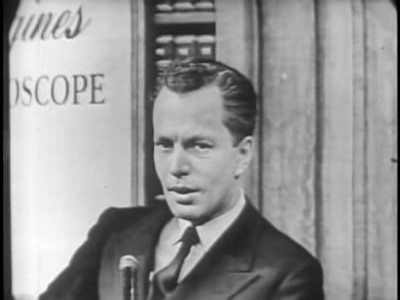
- Winston Burdett from a 1954 interview of Leslie Munro
- Born: Winston Burdett; December 12, 1913; Buffalo, New York, U.S.
- Died: June 19, 1993 (aged 79); Rome, Italy
- Occupations: Broadcast journalist; War correspondent

Winston Burdett (December 12, 1913 – May 19, 1993) was an American broadcast journalist and correspondent for the CBS Radio Network during World War II and later for CBS television news. During the war he became a member of Edward R. Murrow's team of war correspondents known as the Murrow Boys. From 1937 to 1942 Burdett was involved with the Communist Party. He testified before the Senate Internal Security Subcommittee in 1955, detailing his espionage work for the Soviet Union in Europe and naming dozens of other party members.

== Early life ==
Winston Burdett was born December 12, 1913, in Buffalo, New York, where his father was a civil engineer. Burdett attended Harvard University graduating summa cum laude in three years, leaving at age 19 in 1933. Burdett continued his education with graduate work in Romance languages at Columbia University.

== Career and spy work ==
=== Early career and spying ===
Burdett stayed at his first job, at the Brooklyn Daily Eagle, for five years. During his time at the Eagle Burdett worked as a film, theater and book critic. Burdett first joined the Communist Party in 1937 while working at the Eagle, through a group there that was affiliated with the American Newspaper Guild (ANG). He was approached about spying by Nathan Einhorn. Einhorn, a reporter and executive secretary of the New York ANG local, wanted Burdett to meet with Joseph North, the editor of New Masses, the Communist Party USAs journal. At the meeting North suggested a spy mission and introduced him to an unnamed man. At another meeting in New York's Union Square Burdett learned that his mission was in Finland. Finland had fought a 1939 Soviet invasion to a stalemate. His contact at Union Square was later identified by Burdett in a photo as the liaison between CPUSA and the KGB, Jacob Golos.

Burdett left the United States in February 1940, funded by CPUSA and using his press credentials to travel as a roving correspondent. Burdett first traveled to Stockholm and met another contact, "Mr. Miller". Burdett was disillusioned by the party when he met the liaison for his work as a spy in Finland - a tough, crude and offensive KGB man. Miller handed him $200 and detailed the mission. Burdett was to report back on the morale of the Finnish population and troops. Three weeks later, Burdett was visiting Finnish troops in the field when Finland signed the Moscow Peace Treaty. He returned to Stockholm where he told Miller that the Finnish were mostly ready to continue fighting. Miller paid Burdett another $400, thanked him and left.

Burdett detailed his involvement with the Communist Party and his work as a spy at a Senate Internal Security Subcommittee hearing in 1955. Burdett spied intermittently for another two years. He visited the Soviet consulate in Bucharest twice and made a contact in Belgrade, neither resulted in a mission. Burdett worked in Ankara under a Soviet embassy official. Burdett left the party and his spying behind in March 1942.

=== Work at CBS ===
Burdett was one of Edward R. Murrow's original "Murrow's Boys." He was hired by CBS in 1940 while still a member of the Communist Party, information he did not divulge to CBS until a loyalty questionnaire in 1951. As a Murrow cohort he helped pioneer the field of broadcast journalism through radio reports that he and the other "Boys" filed.

For CBS Burdett covered the invasion of Norway, the Axis retreat in North Africa, the invasion of Sicily, the fight for Italy, and the Allied capture of Rome. During the war, the Nazis kicked Burdett out of two countries, Norway and Yugoslavia. After being expelled from Yugoslavia, Burdett began working in Ankara, Turkey. It was here that he would do his most extensive spy work, all while on the payroll at CBS. While working in Ankara, his wife was murdered.

While working out of Rome, Burdett, Joe Masraff, and a CBS cameraman from Cairo went into Yemen to cover a story. They vanished for four weeks, no one in the New York City office knew their whereabouts other than they went into Yemen. When the trio emerged four weeks later, they emerged with what Marvin Kalb, the Director of the Joan Shorenstein Center on the Press, Politics and Public Policy at Harvard University called "the most beautifully shot, beautifully written significant, substantive story about an Arab revolution . . ." While reporting on Iraq in 1959 Burdett, along with UPI's William McHale, was expelled from the nation by Iraqi authorities.

Burdett retired from CBS in 1978 after 22 years in the Rome bureau. After his retirement, during the May 1981 assassination attempt on Pope John Paul II, veteran CBS News correspondent Richard C. Hottelet in New York anchored a news bulletin on CBS Radio, and spoke by telephone with Winston Burdett in Rome.

== Senate testimony ==
=== Testimony ===
In the early 1950s he told the story of his wife's death, which he speculated was due to his refusal to spy for the Soviet Union any longer, to New York Municipal Judge Robert Morris. Morris subsequently encouraged him to speak up about the incident to the Senate Internal Security Subcommittee, where Morris had counseled a few years earlier. The June 28, 1955, testimony was damning; he provided a list of names to the committee of others who were Communists in 1930s, dozens of people were affected by Burdett's testimony.

Burdett's testimony detailed his involvement with the Communist Party and ten other members of the Communist group at the Brooklyn Eagle. He also recalled his spy work for the Soviet Union in detail. Of the first five journalists called from Burdett's testimony at a 1955 hearing before the Senate Internal Security Subcommittee, only one admitted affiliation with the Communist Party, Charles Grutzner of the New York Times. Other journalists that Burdett named included David A. Gordon, of the New York Daily News, who took the Fifth Amendment 29 times, Melvin L. Barnet, a New York Times copyreader since 1953. Barnet lost his job because of his failure to answer questions at the hearing. Another witness, Charles S. Lewis, who had moved on to become news director of WCAX radio and TV stations in Burlington, Vermont, was much more cooperative with the Senate panel. He admitted that "he had been living with this dark secret." Ira Henry Freeman, a New York Times reporter and New York Herald Tribune Military and Aviation Editor Ansel Talbert also testified.

Burdett's testimony prompted at least 35 subpoenas by the Senate Internal Security Subcommittee, headed by Senator James O. Eastland, in November 1955. Of those subpoenas 26 went to present or past New York Times employees. Though many at CBS considered him a traitor after that testimony, Murrow and the network protected him and had him reassigned to Rome. He became an expert in Vatican affairs and lectured students visiting Rome from the rooftop of the CBS building. Burdett also worked for the Federal Bureau of Investigation (FBI) as an informant. The FBI still has 900 pages of classified documents regarding Winston Burdett.

=== July 1955 witnesses ===
This is a list of people named in Burdett's June 1955 testimony who subsequently testified in July before the subcommittee.

- Melvin L. Barnet: New York Times copyreader. Was promptly fired based on his testimony, he took the 5th Amendment and refused to confirm membership in the Communist Party.
- Ira Henry Freeman: New York Times reporter. Admitted to a one-year affiliation with the Communist Party and was allowed to keep his job.
- David A. Gordon: New York Daily News reporter. Took the 5th amendment 29 times. The News fired him within 24 hours.
- Charles S. Lewis: news director WCAX, Burlington, Vermont. Admitted to Communist ties.

=== November subpoenas ===
This is a list of other newspaper employees who were subpoenaed and testified in November 1955 due to Burdett's June testimony.

- James Glaser: a New York Post copy editor.
- Clayton Knowles: a New York Times Washington correspondent from 1947 to 1954.
- Benjamin Fine: New York Times education editor.
- Alden Whitman: New York Times copy editor.
- Seymour Peck: New York Times employee.
- Robert Shelton: New York Times copy editor.
- Jack Shafer: New York Times foreign desk copy editor.
- Nathan Aleskovsky: assistant editor of the Times Sunday Book Review section.
- Samuel Weissman: supervisor of indexers for the New York Times Index.
- Matilda Landsman: New York Times stenographer and secretary.
- Jerry Zalph: New York Times proofreader.
- Otto Albertson: New York Times proofreader.
- John T. McManus: general manager of the independent left-wing weekly National Guardian, New York Times employee from 1921 to 1937.
- James Aronson: executive editor of the National Guardian, New York Times employee in 1946–48.
- Richard O. Boyer: freelancer who contributed profiles to The New Yorker and wrote for the Daily Worker.
- William A. Price: New York Daily News police reporter. Price lost his job as a result of his testimony.
- Dan Mahoney: a rewriter for the New York Daily Mirror.

== Personal life and death ==
Burdett's first wife was Italian anti-fascist journalist, Lea Schiavi. She was murdered in 1942 and Burdett attributed her murder to his decision to leave the Communist Party and stop spying for them. In 1945 he married Giorgina Nathan. He also had two children, Cristina and Richard. Winston Burdett died in Rome on May 19, 1993, after a long illness.

== Selected publications ==
- Encounter With The Middle East in 1969.

== Awards ==
- 1959 Overseas Press Club Award: For his 1958 coverage of the death of Pope Pius XII and the subsequent election of Pope John XXIII.
- 1966 Sigma Delta Chi Award: For distinguished service in journalism.
