= Frank H. Wu =

American law professor and college administrator

- 吳華揚

President of Queens College
- In office July 1, 2020 – July 31, 2026
- Preceded by: William Tramontano (interim)

Chancellor and Dean of the University of California, Hastings College of the Law
- In office July 1, 2010 – December 2015
- Preceded by: Dean Nell, Leo Martinez (acting)

Dean of Wayne State University Law School
- In office 2004–2008
- Preceded by: Joan Mahoney

Personal details
- Born: August 20, 1967 (age 59) Cleveland, Ohio, U.S.
- Spouse: Carol L. Izumi
- Education: Johns Hopkins University (BA); University of Michigan (JD); Harvard University
- Occupation: Law professor, author, academic administrator

Frank H. Wu (Chinese: 吳華揚; pinyin: Wú Huáyáng) is an American legal scholar who served as the president of Queens College of the City University of New York from July 2020 through July 2026. He was previously the William L. Prosser Distinguished Professor at the University of California College of the Law, San Francisco. Wu was also the first Asian American to serve in that position. In November 2015, he announced he would return to teaching.

== Early life and education ==
Wu was born in Cleveland, Ohio, on August 20, 1967, to a Taiwanese American family. Wu's parents were immigrants from Taiwan to the United States. Wu's father was an engineer at Ford Motor Company who lived in Detroit, Michigan.

When Wu was a teenager, a Chinese American man, Vincent Chin, was killed by two white autoworkers in Highland Park, Michigan. The multiple criminal and civil cases that ensued throughout the 1980s have been recognized as birthing the Asian American victims and Asian American movement, and were marked as the 34th Michigan Legal Milestone in 2009. It was the Vincent Chin case that inspired Wu to pursue an active role in civil rights advocacy and the law.

Wu earned his bachelor's degree from Johns Hopkins University in 1988 and his J.D. degree from the University of Michigan Law School in 1991. He also completed courses at the Harvard University Graduate School of Education.

== Career ==
Wu was formerly a law professor at Howard University, resuming a role he held from 1995 to 2004, and visiting professor at Johns Hopkins University, where he taught Asian Americans and the Law. He also was a CV Starr Foundation Visiting Professor at the School of Transnational Law at Peking University, in its English language JD program, in summer of 2009. He has previously taught at Stanford, Michigan, Columbia, Maryland, George Washington University, and Deep Springs College.

From 2004 to 2008, Wu served as the ninth dean of Wayne State University Law School in Detroit, Michigan, succeeding the law school's first female dean, Joan Mahoney (1998–2003). Along with Harold Hongju Koh of Yale Law School and Jim Chen of the University of Louisville School of Law, Wu was one of only three Asian American law school deans in the United States. In April 2007, Wu announced he would resign as dean in May 2008, a year before his appointment was to end, citing his wife's health problems as the leading cause of his resignation. In 2008, he was one of two recipients of the Asian Pacific Fund Chang-Lin Tien Award, given for leadership in higher education. Named for the first Asian American to head a major research university, the award comes with a $10,000 honorarium. He also has received the Trailblazer Award from the National Asian Pacific American Bar Association.

On July 1, 2010, at age 42, Wu became the chancellor and dean of the University of California, Hastings College of the Law in San Francisco, until December 2015. Wu succeeded Nell Newton, who departed in Summer 2009, and acting Chancellor and Dean Leo Martinez. UC Hastings is a unique institution, a standalone law school affiliated with a public system and entitled to brand itself as University of California. Wu was the first Asian American to serve as the chancellor and dean University of California, Hastings College of the Law. In 2012, Wu gained national publicity for rebooting legal education, by announcing that his school would be voluntarily reducing its enrollment by 20 percent over the next three years. UC Hastings was acknowledged as the first leading law school to make such changes.

On March 30, 2020, the Board of Trustees of the City University of New York elected Wu as president of Queens College, City University of New York. He assumed the office on July 1, 2020.

On June 22, 2026, Wu announced his retirement as Queens College president, effective July 30, 2026.

Prior to his academic career, Wu held a clerkship with the late U.S. District Judge Frank J. Battisti in Cleveland, Ohio. He then joined the law firm of Morrison & Foerster in San Francisco, concentrating on complex litigation and devoting a quarter of his time to the representation of indigent individuals.

=== Other activities ===
Wu accepted the trustees of Deep Springs' invitation to serve as a member of the college's governing board; he later was academic affairs chair and vice-chair. Deep Springs College transitioned to co-education during Wu's tenure. Wu previously served as a trustee of Gallaudet University, the school for the deaf and hard-of-hearing, from 2000 to 2010. As a board member, Wu emphasized the significance of shared governance, asserting that decision-making authority at a university leads by serving its many stakeholders, the most important of which are the students. He became vice-chair of that board following the protests over the appointment of Provost Jane Fernandes as president, in 2006.

Wu is a board member of the Leadership Conference for Civil Rights Education Fund, and was appointed on April 17, 2016 as Chairman of the Committee of 100 (United States), the non-profit group of Chinese Americans seeking to promote better US-China relations and the active participation of Chinese Americans in public life, and has chaired its many research projects. He was the Project Advisor for the Detroit Historical Museum exhibit on Chinatown, which opened in spring 2009.

Wu is a commissioner of the Military Leadership Diversity Commission, an organization created to find ways to eliminate any barriers to advancement of minority Service members. Wu was appointed by the Obama administration and served as chair on the 18 member National Advisory Committee on Institutional Quality and Integrity (NACIQI), an organization that advises the Secretary of Education on matters related to postsecondary or higher education accreditation and the eligibility and certification process for higher education institutions to participate in the Federal student aid programs.

In 2008, Wu testified before the Detroit City Council regarding governmental reforms following the controversy regarding Mayor Kwame Kilpatrick. He also has testified before the United States Congress and the Equal Employment Opportunity Commission, and he appeared as an expert witness on behalf of students who intervened in the historic University of Michigan affirmative action case.

Wu frequently appears in the media and on the college lecture circuit. He has debated Dinesh D'Souza and Ward Connerly, among others, on affirmative action and has appeared on both the O'Reilly Factor and Oprah discussing the same. Wu is represented by the American Program Bureau.

In 2017, Wu wrote an article for The Huffington Post titled "A Private Note To Asian-American Activists About New Arrivals". In it, he criticized Asian American progressives for failing to reach out to new Chinese immigrants. The article caused a stir as it was shared in Chinese-language circles where it was interpreted as critical not of progressives but of immigrants, and prompted mixed responses from mainland Chinese (as well as some American-born Chinese) readers.

== Awards ==
- 2004 Named among 20 "Giants in the Classroom" by Black Issues in Higher Education magazine in its 20th anniversary issue (now Diverse Issues in Higher Education)
- 2004 National Asian Pacific American Bar Association's "Best Lawyers Under 40"
- 2004 Crain's magazine "40 under 40"
- 2005 Janet A. Helms Mentoring Award, Columbia University, Teacher's College
- 2005 Tim Dinan Community Service Award, Oakland County (Mich.) Democratic Party
- 2006 Walton A. Lewis Brotherhood Award, Bethel A.M.E. Church, Detroit, Michigan
- 2007 Arthur A. Fletcher Award, American Association for Affirmative Action
- 2007 Special Recognition Award, Wolverine Bar Association
- 2007 Trailblazer Award. Presented by National Asian Pacific American Bar Association.
- 2008 Chang-Lin Tien Education Leadership Award. Presented by Asian Pacific Fund.
- 2012 The Daily Journal's annual "Top 100 Lawyers in California"
- 2013 Ranked Third in the National Jurist's "Most Influential People in Legal Education"
- 2020 Diverse: Issues In Higher Education's "Dr. John Hope Franklin Award"

== Publications ==
Books (author)

- Frank H. Wu (2002). Yellow: Race in America Beyond Black and White.
- Frank H. Wu, Margaret Chon, Eric Yamamoto, Jerry Kang, Carol Izumi (2001). Race, Rights & Reparations: Law and the Japanese Internment.

Books (chapter)

- George Curry, Theodore Hsien Wang (1996). The Affirmative Action Debate.
- Charles Cozic (1996). Illegal Immigration: Opposing Viewpoints.

Books (foreword)

- Wing Young Huie (2007). Looking for Asian American.
- Hazel M. McFerson (editor) (2001). Blacks and Asians: Crossings, Conflict and Commonality.

Articles (op-ed)

- Frank H. Wu (25 July 2019). "Why I care about the Chinese." San Francisco Chronicle.
- Frank H. Wu (17 July 2019). "Tech's modern-day 'Yellow Peril' scare is just the same old racism." The Guardian.
- Frank H. Wu (30 January 2017). "The Truth About Asian Americans And Affirmative Action." HuffPost.
- Frank H. Wu (30 September 2016). "Coming Home to Gallaudet University." HuffPost.
- Frank H. Wu (8 May 2015). "Why Law Firms Fail." "HuffPost".
- Frank H. Wu (27 March 2013). "The Intentional Community of Deep Springs College." HuffPost.
- Frank H. Wu (23 February 2015). "Howard University Changed My Life." HuffPost.
- Frank H. Wu (5 March 2013). "A Lament for Detroit." HuffPost.
- Frank H. Wu (22 June 2012). "Why Vincent Chin Matters." New York Times.
- Frank H. Wu (22 April 2009). "Why Law School Is for Everyone." U.S. News & World Report.
- Frank H. Wu (19 February 2009). "FDR New Deal Legacy Intact, but Internment of Japanese-Americans Lives in Infamy Too." U.S. News & World Report.
- Frank H. Wu (20 August 2008). "On Race: A mockery of Olympic ideals." San Francisco Chronicle.
- Frank H. Wu (17 July 2005). "We all favor diversity, now plan out best path." Detroit Free Press.
- Frank H. Wu (14 June 2002). "The Invisibility of Asian American Scholars." The Chronicle Review.
- Frank H. Wu, Theodore Hsien Wang (30 August 2000). "Singled Out, Based on Race." The Washington Post: A25.
- Frank H. Wu (3 February 1992). "The Fallout From Japan-Bashing." The Washington Post: A11.
- Frank H. Wu (21 January 1991). "...And Others." The Washington Post: A21.
- Frank H. Wu (18 August 1990). "On With The Show; It's wrong to reduce each of us to our respective race." The Washington Post: A21.

Articles (law)

- Frank H. Wu (2011). "Justice Through Pragmatism and Process: A Tribute to Judge Denny Chin." 79 Fordham L. Rev. 1497.
- Frank H. Wu (2010). "Beyond the Symbolic Black and White: The New Challenges of a Diverse Democracy." 53 Howard L.J. 807.
- Frank H. Wu (2009). "Burning Shoes and the Spirit World: The Charade of Neutrality." 44 Harv. C.R.-C.L. L. Rev. 313.
- Frank H. Wu (3 November 2008). "Parental expectations." The National Law Journal.
- Frank H. Wu (2004). "Difficult Decisions During Wartime: A Letter from a Non-Alien in an Internment Camp to a Friend Back Home." 54 Case W. Res. 1301.
- Frank H. Wu (2003). "The Arrival of Asian Americans: An Agenda for Legal Scholarship." 10 Asian L.J. 1.
- Frank H. Wu (January 2001). "Settlements: Winning Over Your Own Client." Practical Litigator 12(1): 5.
- Frank H. Wu (July 2000). "Getting Down to Cases." Practical Litigator 11(4): 5.
- Frank H. Wu (September 2000). "Goodbye to the Bluebook?" Practical Litigator 11(5): 5.
- Frank H. Wu (February 1996). "Changing America: Three Arguments About Asian Americans and the Law." 45 Am. U.L. Rev. 811.

Articles (scholarly)

- Frank H. Wu (2009–2010). "Embracing Mistaken Identity: How the Vincent Chin Case Unified Asian Americans." Asian American Policy Review.
- Frank H. Wu (20 May 2004). "Brown at 50: Keeping Promises." Black Issues in Higher Education.
- Frank H. Wu (2003). "Profiling Principle: The Prosecution of Wen Ho Lee and the Defense of Asian Americans." Asian American Politics: Law, Participation, and Policy.
- Frank H. Wu, Francey Lim Youngberg (2001). "'People from China Crossing the River': Asian Americans & Foreign Influence." Asian Americans and Politics: Perspectives, Experiences, Prospects.
- Frank H. Wu, Gabriel Chin, Sumi Cho, Jerry Kang (1996). Beyond Self-Interest: Asian Pacific Americans Toward a Community of Justice, a policy analysis of affirmative action.

== Filmography ==
- "Politics and Economy: Frank H. Wu on Race in America." NOW. PBS. Commentary broadcast April 12, 2002.
- "Politics and Economy: Frank H. Wu on the Fourth of July." NOW. PBS. Commentary broadcast July 5, 2002.

== Personal life ==
Wu's wife is Carol L. Izumi, a legal scholar.
