= Ansel Talbert =

American journalist (1912–1987)

- Born: Ansel Edward McLaurine Talbert; January 6, 1912
- Died: October 7, 1987 (aged 75); Bridgeport, Connecticut, U.S.
- Occupation: Aviation journalist

Ansel Edward McLaurine Talbert (January 6, 1912 – October 7, 1987) was an American aviation journalist. After being named as a Communist by journalist Winston Burdett, Talbert became well known for his testimony before the Senate Internal Security Subcommittee in 1955. He died at his home in Bridgeport, Connecticut.

== Talbert's work ==
Talbert worked as an aviation writer and editor for more than 50 years. Pre-World War II he interviewed a number of big names in aviation, including Jimmy Doolittle, Charles Lindbergh, Howard Hughes and Billy Mitchell. That work helped call attention to the importance of military aviation in its infancy.

Talbert worked as aviation editor for the now defunct New York Herald Tribune from 1953 until it folded in 1966. After the paper went under he wrote for two aviation trade publications, Travel Agent Magazine and Air Cargo News.
