= Seymour Peck =

American journalist

Seymour Peck (August 23, 1917 — January 1, 1985) was an American journalist. He is well known for his testimony before the Senate Internal Security Subcommittee. He was married to Susan Peck and they lived together for more than 25 years in Hastings-on-Hudson, New York.

== Work at The New York Times ==
Seymour Peck was hired by The New York Times in 1952. He held several positions including deskman for the New York Times Sunday Magazine.

== Peck's Communist affiliation ==
Seymour Peck was forced to testify before the Senate when the Senate Internal Security Subcommittee subpoenaed him in Nov. 1955. The subpoena followed up testimony from journalist Winston Burdett in July of that year. Once on the stand Peck admitted his own involvement with the Communist Party from 1935 to 1949. When pressed by Senators Peck refused to answer questions about the affiliations of other people. He wouldn't name names. Peck a one-time staffer at the defunct Communist leaning New York Compass did not claim the protection of the 5th Amendment to the U.S. Constitution when he refused to answer the questions, he simply refused to answer. This, despite repeated warnings that he risked a contempt citation.

In Dec. 1956 Peck was indicted, along with Robert Shelton, William A. Price, and Alden Whitman, for contempt of Congress by a Washington grand jury. Though he was convicted, the conviction was eventually overturned.

== Death ==
Peck was killed in a car crash on January 1, 1985.

== Trivia ==
Walter Kerr said of Peck, "Seymour Peck’s editorial hand ranged far, wide and deep, touching lightly but expertly ... He seemed less an editor of any sort than the very best sort of guardian angel", in a January 5, 1985 The New York Times article.
