= Melvin L. Barnet =

American journalist (1914–1998)

- Born: November 5, 1914
- Died: June 17, 1998 (aged 83)
- Education: Harvard University
- Occupation: Copy editor

Melvin L. Barnet (November 5, 1914 – June 17, 1998) was a copy editor for The New York Times from 1953 to 1955. He was known for being immediately fired when he invoked the Fifth Amendment to the United States Constitution at a Senate subcommittee hearing in 1955.

== The hearing ==
Barnet, a Harvard-educated journalist, had worked his way to The New York Times when he was implicated, in the testimony of Winston Burdett before the Senate Internal Security Subcommittee, as a Communist.

Barnet was called before the subcommittee on July 13, 1955. The Senators at the hearing were concerned with Barnet's and his associates political activity during the 1930s. Barnet told the subcommittee he had abandoned Communism in 1942. The subcommittee then moved on to question him about other people he may or may not have known "as a Communist."

The committee's attorney presented the names of twenty other people and each time Barnet responded to the question with the same sentence, "I assert my privilege, sir, under the 5th Amendment." When Burdett's name was presented Barnet still refused to identify even his accuser "as a Communist."

After the hearing ended Barnet returned to the Times Washington Bureau where he was handed a note that read, in part, that his conduct "has caused the Times to lose confidence in you as a member of its news staff."

Barnet's career in journalism ended the day of the hearing, he was 40 years old.
