= Alden Whitman =

American journalist (1913–1990)

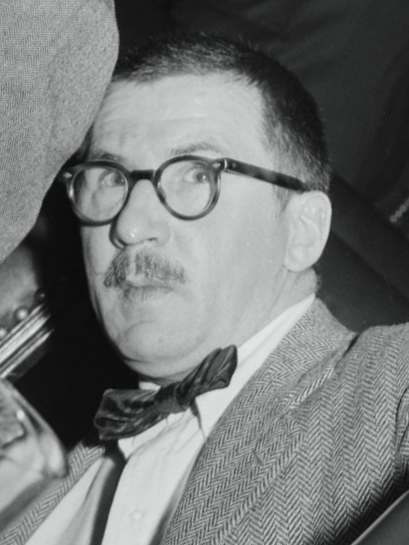
- Whitman in 1956
- Born: October 27, 1913; New Albany, Nova Scotia, Canada
- Died: September 4, 1990 (aged 76); Monte Carlo, Monaco
- Education: Harvard University
- Occupations: Journalist; obituarist; book reviewer; activist
- Years active: 1935–1988
- Employers: New York Herald Tribune (1943—1951); The New York Times (1951—1976)
- Known for: Pioneered the writing of biographical obituaries
- Criminal charges: Contempt of Congress
- Criminal penalty: Probation
- Spouses: Dorothy McLaughlin (m. 1933; div. 1939); Helen Kaposey (m. 1939; div. 1960); Joan McCracken (m. 1960)
- Children: 4
- Awards: George Polk Career Award (1979)

Alden Rogers Whitman (October 27, 1913 – September 4, 1990) was an American journalist who served as chief obituary writer for The New York Times from 1964 to 1976. In that role, he pioneered a more vivid, biographical approach to obituaries, some based on interviews with his subjects in advance of their deaths. Whitman was also the target of a McCarthy-era investigation into communists in the press. Under questioning by the United States Senate Subcommittee on Internal Security in 1956, he acknowledged his affiliation with the Communist Party USA but refused to name other party members. The ensuing eight-year legal battle over contempt of Congress ended with all charges dismissed.

== Early life, career, and political activism ==
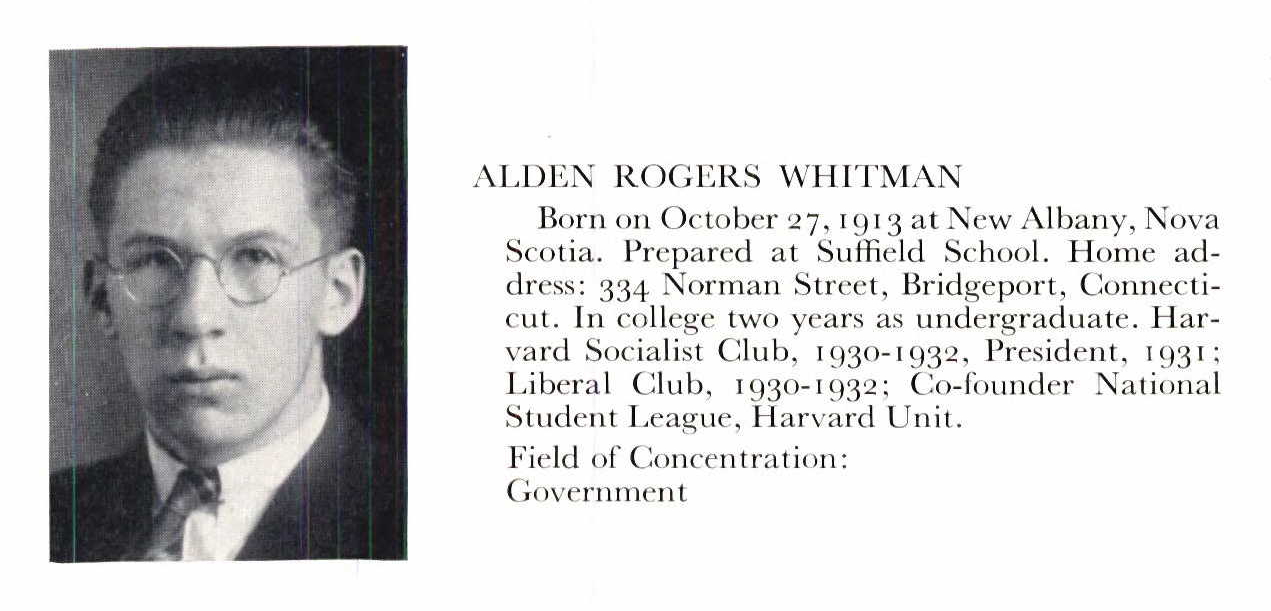
Whitman in the Harvard University yearbook, 1934

Whitman was born in 1913 on his father's farm in New Albany, Nova Scotia. From age two, he lived in his mother's native Connecticut, where both parents taught high school. He showed early interest in journalism, contributing to the local Bridgeport Post-Telegram at 15. "It was like somebody opening up the heavens," Whitman recalled.

Activism, another lifelong theme, became evident in college. Whitman began his Harvard studies in 1930 as a member of the Socialist Club and Party, then edged leftward to the communist-led National Student League. In February 1933, he eloped, "an act", he later interpreted, "of adolescent revolt". His parents withdrew financial support and helped him get a job with a local manufacturer. There, under the sway of union orators, he joined the Communist Party. "It was a fully considered step," Whitman stated in 1984, "and one I've never regretted. Through my membership and because of it, I have, I hope, been able to make some contribution to the fulfillment of the promises of the Declaration of Independence." Upon saving enough to resume college the following year, Whitman wrote his senior thesis on "Strategies and tactics of the Communist Party in the United States." (Note: Documentation of this period diverges on two points. In congressional testimony, Whitman said he joined the Communist Party in "approximately 1935." His 1984 memoir outline, circulated among publishers and colleagues, cites "fall of 1933" as the more precise date. According to Alwood (2007), Whitman participated in the Young Communist League during college. Whitman's college yearbook cites (instead or in addition) the more Ivy-League-oriented National Student League, which appeared on campus in April 1932, near the end of his sophomore year.)

Whitman's communist activities often got in the way of his journalism career. After graduating in 1935, Whitman wrote full-time for the Bridgeport Post-Telegram, but was fired that fall "for attempting to organize a chapter of the American Newspaper Guild." The union-friendly Bridgeport Sunday Herald took him in. "That was a real writing paper," said Whitman. "That's where I learned to write." Eighteen months later, however, his organizing activities ran afoul of a major local employer, General Electric, and he was back on the street.

In 1938, Whitman left his estranged wife and two young children in Bridgeport and followed his future wife to New York City. There, he worked "hand-to-mouth" for a series of Communist-linked, issue-focused groups. Internally, these were conceived as a "United" or "Popular Front" embracing multiple, home-grown leftist constituencies. However, Congress would later label all of the organizations "Communist fronts" and call Whitman to account.

As he outlined in public testimony, Whitman began at the National Committee for People's Rights, a labor advocacy group; then assisted Anna Rochester with a book on farm poverty for International Publishers; wrote anti-Hitler speeches for a veterans organization; raised money on behalf of the North American Committee to Aid Spanish Democracy; served as press agent at Films for Democracy, which aimed to produce leftist movies with Hollywood appeal; and edited cables for Soviet news agency TASS. With the Soviet-German non-aggression pact of August 1939, the Communist Party turned against the war, and Whitman followed suit, joining the New York Peace Committee. Finally, he worked at the American Committee for the Protection of Foreign Born, a legal defense group for immigrants.

When the last of these positions lost funding, in late 1941, Whitman resumed local journalism, this time as a copy editor ("copyreader" was the term at the time). He started at The Buffalo Evening News, then, in 1943, joined the New York Herald Tribune, where he remained for more than eight years, often working the overnight "lobster shift". Like many of his colleagues, Whitman remembered the paper, which folded in 1966, with pride: "We got out an intelligent, well-written, well-edited paper—the best in the city, better than the gray Times—and we did it with great professional eclat and had a good time doing it."

Alongside some ten other party members at the Tribune, Whitman also worked behind the scenes, as he recalled, "doing what good Communists were expected to do—to be active in building the union." But the political mood was changing. Decades later, in his obituary for former U.S. Communist Party leader Earl Browder, Whitman looked back at the period he himself was most active in the party:

The zenith of Communist influence in the United States occurred in the years from 1930 to 1946, when ... Mr. Browder's party, laying claim to native radicalism, attained a membership of 100,000 and, through a network of friendly organizations, exerted a considerable effect on American affairs. (Note: Contemporary scholarship generally affirms Whitman's statement, if in more muted terms. Peak membership is estimated at 75,000 in 1947, with 33,000 in the New York City area. Also, as Whitman acknowledged elsewhere in the Browder obituary, the period was not without hiccups, notably when the party "broke overnight with President Roosevelt's foreign policy upon the signing of the Soviet-German pact in 1939.")

Whitman's biography mirrored this history. He had ventured into communism as a "native" radical contending with the Great Depression, and worked diligently within the "network of friendly organizations". In 1946, the Communist Party expelled Browder and repudiated the coalition strategy. In turn, by 1948, anti-communists within the Newspaper Guild pushed Whitman out of his organizing role and the paper's ownership began to root out communist influence in the newsroom. Around that time, Whitman left the party. (Note: In Senate testimony, Whitman hedged about the year of disaffiliation: "To the best of my recollection, sir, it was 1948. It may have slopped over into 1949, but my memory on that point is not precise." His unpublished memoirs were more forthcoming: "I remained active in the CP [Communist Party] up through the trials of the eleven leaders on the Smith Act charges in 1950")

In his 1984 memoirs, Whitman insisted he never dropped his "Marxist orientation," and offered two explanations for "suspending" his "technical membership". First, disagreement on tactics: he believed the U.S. party's "uncritical support of Soviet policy" ignored "valid national differences on the road to Socialism." Second, self-preservation: he wanted to take "cover" from the "Truman-McCarthy cold war."

Whitman continued at the Tribune until 1951, when he took his copy editing talents to its chief competitor, The New York Times. "Whitman left entirely of his own volition, for a more economically secure workplace" according to Tribune historian and colleague Richard Kluger, "but his politics had plainly endangered him".

== Senate investigation ==
Months after Joseph McCarthy's political downfall and nearly a decade after the investigation of Communists in Hollywood, Congress turned its attention to the press, particularly The New York Times. In July 1955 and January 1956, the Senate Internal Security Subcommittee summoned 34 alleged Communists as witnesses, 18 of them with past or present ties to the Times, Whitman among them. FBI files, released much later, had identified Whitman as a Communist in 1941 and, based on reports from an undercover informant, characterized him as an influential member of the party as late as 1953.

In its editorial pages, the Times argued the investigation was motivated by opposition to "the character of the news" it published. It reiterated its stance against employing current members of the Communist Party but insisted the committee would not "determine in any way the policies of this newspaper". In reality, the fallout was immediate. Upon receiving a subpoena, Whitman was stripped of supervisory responsibilities and demoted to his original copy editing position, or, as he put it, "bumped all the way back to the rim". Lawyers at the Times met with each witness to demand a full accounting and warn them that hiding behind the Fifth Amendment was cause for dismissal.

Under public questioning in the Senate, Whitman acknowledged prior Communist affiliation but denied any seditious intent and refused, based on the First Amendment and an "extremely active New England conscience," to name any colleagues as party members. "The investigative process," read his statement, "like the legislative power to which it is an adjunct" must not impinge on the "beliefs, associations, and activities of individuals connected with the press". Fellow journalists Seymour Peck, Robert Shelton, and William Price responded similarly. All four were cited for contempt of Congress. Whitman was convicted in 1957. The Supreme Court overturned the conviction in 1962 on narrow technical grounds, and Whitman was re-indicted and re-convicted by the Department of Justice under Robert Kennedy. Finally, in 1964, the department moved to dismiss the case, which was formally dropped on November 29, 1965.

In his book on the investigation, Edward Alwood argues that Whitman ran out the clock on McCarthyism. Had he and the other journalists convicted of contempt staged their defense years earlier "they would have faced the more severe punishment meted out to the Hollywood Ten, who had raised similar issues." In the event, Whitman retained his freedom, but was "exhausted by the strain" of sustaining a legal defense with a rotating crew of volunteers, intermittent support from the American Civil Liberties Union and none from the Newspaper Guild. During the period, Whitman divorced wife number two, married wife number three and suffered a heart attack, yet the defining phase of his journalistic career still lay ahead.

== Obituaries ==
Whitman remained at the Times, albeit with few bylines, (Note: Before the Senate subpoena, 18 articles with Whitman's byline were printed in the Times, all book reviews. The FBI considered the book review section to be "the most heavily infiltrated department" at the paper. Five bylines appeared during Whitman's brief legal reprieve in 1960-61. A steady trickle of mostly book reviews reappeared in 1965, when dismissal of all charges was assured.) throughout the McCarthyist ordeal. Colleague David Halberstam suggested Whitman was effectively "blacklisted" and, like "a plant trying to grow through concrete", had to find a neglected gap in the newsroom in order to write freely. Opportunity came late in 1964 as the contempt case headed towards dismissal and an outsize, multi-author, genre-busting Churchill obituary fell into disarray. Whitman was tasked with the clean-up. When he succeeded, (Note: A six-column obituary, "deftly cut" by Whitman, appeared the same morning Churchill died. An 8-page "special supplement" entitled "Winston Churchill: His Life and Times" was published the next day to "wide acclaim". A 160-page book version "was airlifted to bookstores around the world" for sale a day later.) editors asked him to carry forward the new formula. (Note: Several of Whitman's editorial bosses are credited with a role. Harrison Salisbury, assistant managing editor during the events, wrote that Whitman "invented the superobituary under [managing editor] Clifton Daniel's tutelage." While acknowledging Daniel, Whitman said he received his assignment from metropolitan editor Abe Rosenthal and set about refashioning advance obits "in the mold Abe Rosenthal imagined.") "There was a sense," Halberstam recalled, "that whatever leftist bent he had couldn't really hurt people in death."

During his eleven years as head of the historically unglamorous, apolitical and byline-free obituary desk, Whitman penned Churchill-style memorials to some 400 other notables—Ho Chi Minh, Pablo Picasso Helen Keller, Haile Selassie, J. Robert Oppenheimer, and on and on. In almost every case, Whitman drafted the piece well in advance and periodically revised it until the subject's death. By 1967, obituaries began to carry his byline.

Reviewers recognized Whitman as "theoretician and executor" of a "revolution" in obituaries. He replaced the traditional litany of names and dates with biographical essays that conveyed the "flavor" of a person, engaged their specific, sometimes "abstruse", expertise, and placed them in the sweep of history. Whitman, intent on presenting complicated lives without funereal gloss or editorial censure, called the approach "many-sided"; Halberstam, emphasizing the long advance preparation, saw Whitman as a "jewel cutter"; Gay Talese, in a 1966 profile of Whitman, highlighted the roving curiosity of his "marvelous, magpie mind". Whitman's opening sentence on J. B. S. Haldane demonstrates the mix of perspectives:

Facially Professor Haldane resembled Rudyard Kipling; epigrammatically he took after George Bernard Shaw; politically he followed Karl Marx; but in science he was indubitably John Burdon Sanderson Haldane.

The multiple chapters and photos in the Truman obituary are typical of Whitman's mini-biographies.

To inform his work, Whitman deployed the primary tool of other journalists, namely, the interview. "In all the history of journalism, including the caves," Sidney Zion wrote in an obituary of Whitman himself, "nobody ever thought to draw the future dead into their own obituaries". Whitman conducted his first obituary-focused interview with former U.S. president Harry Truman in 1966 at the recommendation of Times managing editor and Truman son-in-law Clifton Daniel. This amiable encounter became Whitman's model: "semistructured conversation", as he put it, "sub specie aeternitatis." (Note: Whitman was not so fond of the actual Truman obituary. Several months after its publication, he wrote a playful-yet-serious manifesto for Newsweek, entitled "Truth in Death." Here, Whitman complained that obituaries, his own, presumably, included, had lent an "odor of sanctity" to Truman who was, in fact, "a narrow man" and "one of the willing architects of a malefic foreign policy that brought death to thousands in Korea and that involved us in a fruitless cold war." Truman was but one "victim" of such embalming, Whitman recognized. "Perhaps," he concluded, "the generation of the 1970s will be willing to accept the notion of clothing the deceased in the same garb he wore in life, gravy stains and all.") The public, however, was intrigued by the potential awkwardness. "Aren't such interviews ghoulish?" came the inevitable question, earning Whitman magazine profiles, a Tonight Show appearance, and an overall "bit of fame".

Despite their notoriety, interviews were a rarity, done for "no more than ten percent" of obituaries. (Note: It's often assumed that Whitman interviewed everyone, that the transcripts were locked away until death, and that every poignant, unattributed quote in his obituaries derived from these confidential encounters. (In her book on obituarists, Marilyn Johnson claims Whitman "cultivated [this] mystique.") The New York Times obituary of Whitman falsely credited him with interviewing people he denied talking to, such as Albert Schweitzer, Helen Keller, Ho Chi Minh, John L. Lewis, Joseph P. Kennedy, Mies van der Rohe, Pablo Casals and Pablo Picasso. Picasso, for one, refused the invitation. Nonetheless, his obituary is among the longest and, thanks to passages from his lovers' memoirs, most intimate.) The object wasn't more material—Whitman's famous interlocutors already offered plenty—so much as refinement, focus, "a glimpse of the inner person". Indeed, the bulk of what he heard appeared in feature stories while subjects remained very much alive; the merest nuggets "filtered into obits". Consider, for example, Alexander Kerensky, briefly leader of a new Russian revolutionary government before Lenin and the Bolsheviks ran him into exile. "For the remainder of his life," according to Whitman, Kerensky "passed his time in fulminations". While their interview generated a front-page article several days after it was conducted, the obituary contained only a single, brief snippet, epitomizing Kerensky's purgatory: "He expressed a nostalgic desire to return to his native land if the authorities 'will not silence me.'" (Note: The quote appeared in a different form in the earlier article: "I will return [to Russia] tomorrow, if it would be possible, on one condition—that I will not be silent.")

Whitman was also the first journalist to write about Donald Trump and put the future president's words in print. In 1973, Whitman interviewed the 26-year-old Donald alongside his 67-year-old father, Fred, to prepare for the latter's death. While the obituary waited until 1999, the interview resulted in a contemporaneous profile of the duo. There, Whitman, with his attention to legacy, portrayed Fred Trump as an accomplished real estate "alchem[ist]" who, in a final act, was turning his building and marketing skills on his unproven successor by propping him up in Manhattan and crediting him with this very power of alchemy: "Everything he touches turns to gold," Whitman quoted Fred, introducing a phrase that would echo through the 2016 election.

While Whitman was resigned to the conventional wealth-and-fame criteria for inclusion on the obituary page, he championed a broader oral history beyond. He served as special advisor to the Columbia University Center for Oral History Research and wrote book reviews to promote oral histories and oral autobiographies, especially those that gave voice to the illiterate, oppressed or ignored. (Note: Among other reviews, Whitman lauded All God's Dangers: The Life of Nate Shaw (Rosengarten, 1974) as an "autobiograph[y] of surpassing greatness" and Amoskeag: Life and Work in an American Factory-City (Hareven and Langenbach, 1979) as a "gripping human saga... [H]istory is best understood from the bottom up.") Speaking to the Oral History Association in 1974, Whitman said:

To understand ourselves as people, I believe we must know so much more than we do now about the lives and thoughts of those groups that comprise the multitude, people, to use a nasty phrase, in the 'subcultures'—the Black, the poor, the Hispanics, the women, the Chicanos. We need to know about their beliefs, their attitudes, their games, their work-lives, their flashpoints, their self-images, their aspirations.

Whitman retired from the Times in 1976, though remaining advance obituaries would appear over the following few years. Insurance mogul James S. Kemper, who died in 1981, was the subject of Whitman's last published obituary; it began, "[He] was very rich."

== Later years ==
Upon retiring from the Times, Whitman picked up the pace of his book reviews, focusing on biography, memoir and history. He contributed regularly to Newsday, Harper's Bookletter, and The Chronicle of Higher Education's short-lived Books & Arts, and appeared in such newspapers as the Chicago Tribune, Los Angeles Times and, of course, The New York Times itself. His final published review, of Eric Hobsbawm's The Age of Empire, afforded yet another contemplation of Marx and capitalism. As David Halberstam remarked, "He kept going. I mean, it was quite an heroic career."

In the 1980s Whitman suffered a debilitating stroke which left him blind. His wife, Joan, hired several Long Island University college students to come to their home in Southampton, New York, to engage in a daily ritual of reading Whitman stories from major newspapers and weekly magazines. He died from another stroke at a hospital in Monaco on September 4, 1990, aged 76. He had traveled the country to attend birthday celebrations for food critic Craig Claiborne, who had turned 70 that day.

== Pseudonyms ==
- Whitman recalled using a "phony name" after his first arrest, during college, while protesting on behalf of Communist union organizer Ann Burlak: "I vanished. It was a close call."
- Between 1939 and 1946, Whitman published dozens of articles, mostly book reviews, in the Daily Worker under the byline Stephen Peabody.
- Arthur Gelb, drama critic at the Times, accused Whitman of assuming his name to woo an aspiring actress at a bar. "I stopped just short of threatening his life," Gelb wrote of the 1953 incident.
- Whitman claimed to have become a "leading medical journalist" under the pen name Roger White while moonlighting during his legal travails.
- In 1958, Whitman courted his third wife, New York Times colleague Joan McCracken, by sending "notes in brown envelopes up to her through the house mail, the first of which read, 'You look ravishing in paisley,' and was signed, 'The American Paisley Association.'"

== Bibliography ==
=== Books ===
- Labor Parties: 1827-1834. International Publishers, 1943.
- Portrait: Adlai E. Stevenson (editor). Harper & Row, 1965.
- The Obituary Book. Stein & Day, 1971.
- Come to Judgment. Viking Press, 1980.
- American Reformers: An H. W. Wilson Biographical Dictionary (editor). H.W. Wilson Co., 1985.

=== Selected obituaries ===
- Albert Schweitzer
- Alexander Kerensky
- Alice B. Toklas
- Charlie Chaplin
- Chiang Kai-shek
- Earl Browder
- Elizabeth Arden
- Haile Selassie
- Harry Truman
- Helen Keller
- Henry Miller
- Ho Chi Minh
- J. B. S. Haldane
- J. Robert Oppenheimer
- Le Corbusier
- Margaret Mead
- Pablo Picasso
- T. S. Eliot
- Upton Sinclair
- Vladimir Nabokov
- William Christian Bullitt Jr.

== Honors ==
1979: George Polk Awards (Career Award)
