= Samuel Weissman =

Samuel Weissman (December 11, 1909 - February 7, 2004) was a long time New York Times employee. He worked as the supervisor of indexers at the Times.

== Family ==
Weissman was married to his wife for 58 years. He had a son named Paul and a daughter-in-law named Lourdes. He also had two grandchildren, Gabriel and Julian.

== Career ==
He worked for The New York Times from August 1935 until his retirement in January 1978.

== Controversy ==
He was one of 26 New York Times employees implicated by Winston Burdett in his testimony before the Senate Internal Security Subcommittee during its investigation into Communism in the media. Weissman testified in Jan. 1956 after being subpoenaed in November of the preceding year. In his testimony he denied present Communist Party membership but invoked the Fifth Amendment when asked about past affiliations with the party.

== Death ==
Weissman died February 7, 2004, at the age of 94.
