= Lea Schiavi =

Italian journalist (1907–1942)

- Born: March 2, 1907; Borgosesia, Province of Vercelli, Piedmont region, Italy
- Died: April 24, 1942 (aged 35); South Persia (Iran)
- Cause of death: Gunshot
- Burial place: Tabriz, Iran
- Education: Conservatoir de Paris
- Occupation: Journalist
- Political party: anti-Fascist and Communist
- Spouse: Winston Burdett

Lea Schiavi, also known as Lea Schiavi Burdett, (March 2, 1907 – April 24, 1942), an Italian dissident journalist writing for left-wing journals in opposition to the Italian fascist government led by Benito Mussolini. Her husband Winston Burdett believed Schiavi was assassinated by either the Russians, Italian anti-fascists, or Persians while traveling through Iran.

== Personal ==
Lea Schiavi was born in Borgosesia, Province of Vercelli, in the Piedmont region, Italy in 1907. Schiavi was educated in the fine arts at the Conservatoire de Paris.

She became a writer and journalist and met Winston Burdett, an American CBS News correspondent, in 1940 while they were both reporting from Belgrad, Yugoslavia. The couple was married while both were reporting from East Europe during World War II. They also reported from the Middle East and were in Lebanon, Turkey, Syria and Iran from 1940 to 1942.

Schiavi was 35 at the time of her murder in Northwestern Iran (Barde Rashan village, Mahabad), Iran and her body was taken to Tabriz, Iran for burial.

== Career ==
Lea Schiavi was an Italian dissident, anti-fascist and possibly a communist. Her opposition to Nazism and Italian Fascism hardened while reporting during the war. She hoped to create an organization that would fight against fascism and Nazism.

She was an Italian journalist and author. Schiavi wrote primarily for left-wing journals. During World War II, Schiavi was reporting from Belgrade, Bucharest, Budapest, and Sofia and while working for Italian newspapers L'Ambrosiano and Il Tempo. Schiavi was doing a photography assignment for the New York City newspaper PM in northern Iran at the time of her death.

== Death ==
Lea Schiavi was murdered by undetermined assailants in South Persia on April 24, 1942, while her husband Winston Burdett was reporting in India.

While the murder was never solved it is believed to be, based on the testimony of Burdett, that the murder was directly related to Burdett's no longer spying for the Soviet Union due to his ongoing disillusionment with Communism. The story Burdett told at the Congressional hearing was that his wife was working in South Persia, reporting from Kurdistan. When her vehicle was stopped by a truck full of Russian soldiers, they immediately started specifically asking if she was in the car. When they found out she was, she was killed instantly. Burdett believed she was killed because she had uncovered links between military training camps in Iran and an upcoming communist coup in Yugoslavia.

In another version of this story, Schiavi was traveling on assignment with the New York newspaper PM, which involved travel through Azerbaijan with Zina Agaian, her Armenian friend and a daughter of a deputy, when a Kurdish boy stopped the vehicle and asked for Schiavi by name. When she responded that it was her, the Kurd killed her by shooting her in the chest.

Yet another version of the story told by Schiavi's father Natalino Schiavi was that Lea had fallen victim to the anarchy that broke out during the Hama Rashid revolt in Iran around 1942.

Another theory was that Lea Schiavi was killed by the Italians because she was too important in anti-fascism efforts by the Italian community in Iran. This theory was investigated at the time by Lauro Laurenti while seeking answers to Schiavi's murder and taken up later by Italian historian Mimmo Franzinelli.

== Context ==
Iran in the early 1940s has been described as a "crossroads" for spies as it was strategically important.

According to Burdett, an officer of the American Counterintelligence Corp told him that there was evidence that Schiavi was assassinated with arrangements by the Russians. During her trip to Iran, Russians had been in training there, and Schiavi came across important information the Russians did not want a journalist to know about. The death of Schiavi caused Burdett to get the American Embassy officials and Tabriz officials involved in helping him investigate the crime.

== Impact ==
Schiavi's murder partly influenced Burdett to testify about his espionage before the Senate Internal Security Subcommittee.
