= Dean Lake (Annapolis) =

Lake in Nova Scotia, Canada

Dean Lake Annapolis
- Location within Nova Scotia
- Location: Annapolis County, Nova Scotia
- Coordinates: 44°26′50″N 65°3′39″W
- Basin countries: Canada
- Surface elevation: 98 m (322 ft)
- Islands: 11
- Settlements: New Albany

Dean Lake Annapolis is a lake of Annapolis County, Nova Scotia, Canada.

== See also ==
- List of lakes in Nova Scotia
