= Nathan Aleskovsky =

American journalist (1912–1969)

Nathan Aleskovsky (December 21, 1912 – November 11, 1969) was an American journalist who was employed by The New York Times in the 1950s. He was working as an assistant to the editor of The New York Times Book Review when in January 1956 he was forced to testify before the Senate Internal Security Subcommittee, chaired by James O. Eastland, after being fingered in fellow journalist Winston Burdett's testimony. Aleskovsky had worked for the Times for five years at the time he was subpoenaed in November 1955.

When Aleskovsky was asked by the committee if he was a Communist he denied "now being a Communist". He refused to say if he had ever belonged to the Party. The New York Times asked for and received Aleskovsky's resignation prior to the hearing. Of the 26 subpoenas that came down in November 1955 for the January 1956 hearings 26 of them went to past or present The New York Times employees, Aleskovsky was among six who cited the Fifth Amendment as protection from answering the subcommittee's questions.

Aleskovsky was born in Brooklyn to Oscar Aleskovsky and Sarah Horowitz Aleskovsky, Jewish emigrants from Belarus. He married Emma Clarke in Davenport, Iowa, in 1940. He died in a car crash in 1969 at age 57.
