= James Glaser =

James Glaser (June 25, 1899 – March 1985) was a copy editor at the New York Post and also spent time working at the New York Times. During his tenure at the Times he was an active member of the Communist Party. Glaser was called before the Senate Internal Security Subcommittee in Jan. 1956 during their investigation into communism in the media.

== Editing the Daily Worker ==
In 1934 Glaser left his copy editing job at the New York Times to take the managing editor position at the Communist-leaning Daily Worker. When he arrived one of his first acts was to write a brief about his move from the Times to the Worker. The next day, when he picked up the Worker, he was shocked to find a completely different brief saying he would be writing a series about graft and corruption at the Times. He rushed from party leader's office to party leader's office trying to figure out who changed the managing editor's copy. Finally he met "Mr. Edwards," the representative from Moscow. "Mr. Edwards explained that the series was necessary to make sure Glaser was "tried and true," and that he didn't carry with him the taint of a capitalist paper, the Times. Glaser never gave into the pressure to write the series.

"Mr. Edwards turned out to be Gerhart Eisler, who later became the propaganda chief for the East German government. It turned out that much of the paper's policy was controlled by Eisler, including its editorial policy.

Glaser, used to a five-day work week at the Times saw employees of the Worker laboring six days a week. Naturally, he tried to change that by ordering a five-day work week. Eisler immediately vetoed his order saying that "we couldn't delay the revolution for a day." Eisler was the true force in command, from work week length to editorial policy; he was the one really managing the Daily Worker.

Harry Gannes, the foreign editor, once turned in a story about imminent communist revolution in France. Glaser, being a watchful journalist, had heard nothing of the sort so he inquired into the story further with Cannes. When he approached Cannes about the story, Cannes said, "Comrade, this is the line." Glaser was flabbergasted, "Do you mean that you just sat down and dreamed this up on the typewriter?" Cannes' only reply was that he shouldn't talk that way to a comrade. Glaser killed the story anyway. When he did Eisler dressed him down, telling him that he "had insufficient political development and still had bourgeois traits."

Glaser dealt with journalistic dishonesty and inefficiency at every turn. Once, when he asked a copyboy for a cut of William Green, the late AFL leader, it was found filed under "P" for "prominent labor fakers."

== The hearing ==
Glaser was subpoenaed by the Senate Internal Security Subcommittee in November 1955. He was one of 26 current and former New York Times employees to be subpoenaed, along with 8 others from different newspapers and a brother to one of the other witnesses. Glaser was implicated during the testimony of journalist Winston Burdett in June 1955.

Glaser cooperated fully with the subcommittee, especially when compared with some of the other newspaper employees who pleaded the First and Fifth Amendments. Glaser told the subcommittee how he was a communist during his time as a copy editor at the New York Times, a post he quit in 1934 to become managing editor of the Daily Worker. The job at the Worker cost Glaser 35% of his salary. He told the subcommittee that two years after joining the Daily Worker he worked up "the strength" to leave both the party and the paper; the strength to stop being such a "lunkhead," "chump" and "poor, miserable, tragic fool." Though he cooperated fully, Glaser opined, "(the hearing was) to make a sort of public spectacle of me, because of the dreadful, terrible mistake I made more than 21 years ago."
