= William B. Mahoney =

American journalist (1912–2004)

William B. Mahoney (1912–2004) was a prize-winning U.S. journalist and writer who had a successful late-in-life second career as a substance-abuse counselor.

Born to a farming family in Ballynacarriga in County Cork, Ireland, in 1912, Bill Mahoney immigrated to the United States with his parents and siblings when he was 14. Not long after the family settled in New York City, he became a copyboy at the New York Daily Mirror, a morning tabloid of the William Randolph Hearst publishing empire. Over the next years, despite being sidelined for a time by tuberculosis, he rose to the sports desk at the Mirror; he also organized for the Newspaper Guild. He was eventually joined both on the Mirror staff and as a Guild organizer by his brother, Dan Mahoney (1916–99). (Dan lost his job on the paper during the post-war purges of actual or suspected Communists).

After the United States entered World War II, Bill—who was unable to serve because of his earlier illness—left the Mirror for free-lance writing, and by the immediate post-war years was being published in such magazines as the Saturday Evening Post and Cosmopolitan. Two Post stories were anthologized, "The Stolen Belt" in the magazine's Best Stories of 1948 collection and "Wrong Guy" in a collection for high-school students.

By 1950, however, free-lance writing was inadequate to support Mahoney's growing family—he had four children from his two marriages, to Beatrice Shishko and Jeanne Adleman. He went back to journalism, joining the staff of the short-lived Daily Compass as a sports writer. After a stint in public relations, he edited the Hotel Trades Council's magazine Hotel, which won many union journalism awards under his leadership.

In the mid-1960s, having struggled for years with an ever-worsening drinking problem, he found sobriety with the help of Alcoholics Anonymous and moved to upstate New York, where he became an alcohol- and substance-abuse counselor for local public health agencies. Eventually he moved to Berkeley, California, and finally, in the early 1990s, to Miami, remaining involved with AA—and sponsoring scores of other alcoholics on their road to sobriety—wherever he lived. He died in Miami in 2004 at the age of 92.

All four of his children and at least one of his grandchildren are published writers (as was his second wife, Jeanne Adleman (1919–99)). His oldest daughter, Judith Mahoney Pasternak, is a journalist and author of several books on travel and popular culture. His two younger daughters, Joan Mahoney and Martha R. Mahoney, are widely published legal scholars. Joan Mahoney served as dean at Western New England College of Law and Wayne State University Law School in Detroit and has written extensively on reproductive rights, constitutional law, legal history, comparative civil liberties, and bioethics. Martha R. Mahoney is a professor at the University of Miami and writes about domestic violence and critical race theory and is co-author (with John Calmore and Stephanie Wildman) of a legal casebook, Social Justice: Professionals, Communities, and Law. Don Mahoney, Bill Mahoney's only son, was a noted direct-mail copywriter until his death in 2015 and co-author of The Rise of Gold in the 21st Century. Judith Mahoney Pasternak's older son, the late Adam T. Lass, wrote on economics, investing, and stocks until his death in October 2016 and co-wrote a travel guide to Washington, DC, with his mother.
