= George Polk =

American journalist (1913–1948)

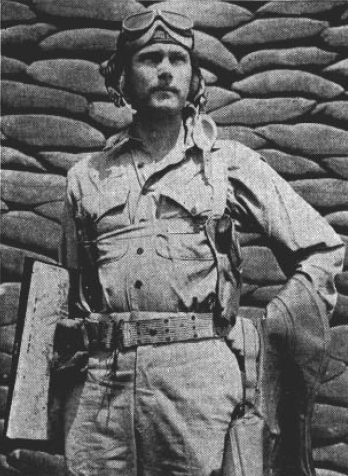
- Polk, c. 1943
- Born: George Washington Polk, Jr. October 17, 1913; Fort Worth, Texas, U.S.
- Died: May 9, 1948 (aged 34); Thessaloniki, Greece
- Occupation: Journalist
- Notable credit: CBS
- Spouse: Rea Coccins

George Washington Polk Jr. (October 17, 1913 – May 9, 1948) was an American journalist for CBS who was murdered during the Greek Civil War in 1948.

== Early life and education ==
Polk was born in Fort Worth, Texas, the son of lawyer George Washington Polk Sr. and librarian Adalaide (née Roe). He studied at the Virginia Military Institute from 1930 to 1933, but withdrew prior to receiving a degree.

== Career ==
In 1933, Polk began working as a salesman. Five years later, in 1938, he completed his undergraduate degree in English at the University of Alaska Fairbanks, and had begun writing for the Fort Worth Press.

After graduating, he lived in Asia, where he joined the Shanghai Evening Post. In 1940, he returned to the United States, working then for the Herald Tribune and teaching at New York University.

=== World War II ===
During World War II, Polk enlisted with a Naval Construction Battalion. After the invasion of Guadalcanal, the first element of Construction Unit Base 1 (CUB-1), an advance fuel and supply base, landed on August 16, 1942. This element was commanded by Ensign George W. Polk, USNR, and consisted of five officers and 118 enlisted personnel, all navy petty officers of aviation support ratings. CUB-1 later received a Presidential Unit Citation for its service. Polk also performed duty as a "volunteer" dive bomber and reconnaissance pilot. He was wounded, suffered from malaria and was hospitalized for almost a year.

== Death ==
On Sunday May 16, 1948, Polk was found dead near the Port of Thessaloniki, shot at point-blank range in the back of the head, with his hands and feet tied.

Polk had been covering the Greek Civil War between the Greek government and communists trying to seize control of the country. His intention was to meet and interview Markos Vafeiadis, a communist military leader.

In Polk's articles, he alleged that several officials in the Greek government embezzled $250,000 in foreign aid ($2.5 million in 2016 dollars) from the Truman administration, a charge that was never proved. Polk, sympathetic to the communists, was outspoken in his criticism of the Truman administration's unqualified support for what he viewed as a "rightist authoritarian regime" in Greece, in its resistance to the communist attempt to seize power.

== Aftermath ==
In the late 1970s, details emerged on how American Mission for Aid to Greece authorities helped the Greek Police frame two young communists for his murder. A communist journalist, Gregorios Staktopoulos, was tried and convicted of helping Vaggelis Vasvanas and Adam Mouzenidis, members of the illegal communist army, commit the murder. The communist guerilla radio station said that Adam Mouzenidis was already dead, having been killed during aerial bombing by the Hellenic Air Force, when Polk was murdered. Staktopoulos himself maintained that the confession that led to his conviction was obtained through torture. In fact, it was later revealed that Mouzenidis had arrived at Salonica, where he was allegedly introduced to Polk, two days after Polk's murder, and Vasvanas was not in Greece at the time.

An investigation by James G. M. Kellis (also known as Killis), a former OSS officer with knowledge of Greek political circles and power brokers, concluded that Greek communist circles lacked the power and influence to commit the murder and cover it up. Kellis worked on contract for the Wall Street law firm of William 'Wild Bill' Donovan, the former head of the OSS, who was hired by journalist Walter Lippman to investigate the case.

Following Kellis' conclusion that it was more likely Polk had been murdered by right-wing groups within or affiliated to the Greek government, the investigation was halted and Kellis was recalled to Washington, D.C. At the time, the U.S. government was financially supporting the Greek government to prevent a communist take-over of the country. The British government supported the Greek government during World War II, but this became financially impossible for the British government following the war's end.

Reporters in New York City started a fundraising project to send an independent investigation committee to Greece. From this effort, the Newsmen's Commission was formed. Members included Ernest Hemingway, William Polk (George Polk's brother), William A. Price (Polk's cousin), and Homer Bigart. This was soon eclipsed in media coverage by the Lippmann Committee, including mostly Washington, D.C.–based journalists, including Walter Lippmann as chairman and James Reston of The New York Times.

Within months of his death, a group of American journalists created the George Polk Awards for outstanding radio or television journalism. These awards were modeled after the Pulitzer Prize, which is awarded for outstanding print journalism in newspapers.

== Personal life ==
Polk married Kay Phillips in 1939.

Polk married Rea Coccins (also known as Rhea Kokkonis), a Greek national and ex-stewardess, seven months prior to his death. They had no children. After being allegedly harassed and threatened by the Greek government, Rea fled to the U.S., where she was debriefed by Donovan's law firm. She became friendly with Barbara Colby, the wife of William Colby, a former OSS officer attached to Donovan's firm, who later would become director of the CIA.

== Criticism ==
In February 2007, Polk's "status as a symbol of journalistic integrity" was challenged by historian Richard Frank, who concluded that Polk made false claims about his service record in World War II. Frank examined the claim, repeated by Edward R. Murrow, that Polk had commanded a unit of 119 marines on Guadalcanal, flew a fighter plane that shot down 11 Japanese aircraft and was awarded a Purple Heart. He concluded that it is not consistent with the available documentation. Frank said that "the inescapable conclusion is that George Polk did not simply verbally recount false tales of his wartime exploits to his family and to his journalist colleagues, he actually forged documents to buttress his stories."

George Polk's brother, William, replied to this attack, which he called slanderous, in a letter to The Guardian on March 19, 2007. He pointed out that Frank did not discuss a single article Polk ever wrote and that his military record is amply substantiated in a range of military documents, including a picture of Polk being decorated by Vice-Admiral John McCain on November 30, 1943, on behalf of the "Airplane Cruiser Detachment ... for their heroic role during the Battle for the Solomons."

In April 2007, Frank responded to William Polk's letters and to what he considered a baffling silence from journalists that greeted his charges.

== U.S. Postal stamp ==
On October 5, 2007, the United States Postal Service announced that it would honor five journalists of the 20th century with first-class rate postage stamps, to be issued on Tuesday, April 22, 2008: Martha Gellhorn, John Hersey, George Polk, Rubén Salazar, and Eric Sevareid. Postmaster General Jack Potter announced the stamp series at the Associated Press Managing Editors Meeting in Washington.

Polk was related to U.S. Presidents James Knox Polk and Andrew Jackson.

== See also ==
- Cold War
- Frank Polk
