= Richard O. Boyer =

Richard O. Boyer (10 January 1903 – 7 August 1973) was an American freelance journalist.

== Background ==
Richard Owen Boyer was born on January 10, 1903, in Chicago.

== Career ==
Boyer worked at various newspapers, including the St. Louis Post Dispatch, Boston Herald, New Orleans Item, and Dallas Times Herald.

Boyer co-founded the Boston Newspaper Guild.

He contributed to The New Yorker magazine during the 1930s and 1940s.

In the late 1940s, he was foreign correspondent for PM newspaper in Germany, France, Italy, and Central America. He was also editor of U.S. Week.

In 1948, he was an editor of the cultural monthly magazine Masses & Mainstream.

Before appearing at a Senate hearing, he had written for the Daily Worker. He was implicated in Winston Burdett's June 1955 testimony before the Senate Internal Security Subcommittee hearings as a Communist. The Senate subpoenaed Boyer in November 1955 and he testified the next January. At the hearing, Boyer refused to answer questions about his affiliations with the Communist Party, under the protection of the First and Fifth Amendment. He was one of many witnesses in 1956 called by the Subcommittee in an "inquiry into New York press. To questions of whether he was a Communist or whether others were party members, the write invoked both his First and Fifth Amendments. Privately, however, Boyer identified himself as a Communist, saying that he had been a party member from the 1930s until 1956, when Nikita Khrushchev, the then Soviet leader, disclosed the secrets of the Stalin regime."

== Death ==
Boyer died age 70 on August 7, 1973.

== Works ==
- The Dark Ship (1947)
- If This Be Treason (1948)
- Labor's Untold Story: The Adventure Story of the Battles, Betrayals and Victories of American Working Men and Women (1955)
