= Joan Mahoney =

American legal scholar (born 1943)

Joan Mahoney (born 1943) is a legal scholar and former dean of two law schools. She served as Dean at Wayne State University Law School in Detroit, Michigan, from 1998 to 2003, the first woman law school dean in Michigan and one of the very few women in the United States to have held the deanship at two different law schools. Prior to her tenure as Dean at Wayne State, she served from 1994 to 1996 as Dean of Western New England College School of Law in Springfield, Massachusetts. (Women law school deans remain a distinct minority; others have included Barbara Aronstein Black at Columbia Law School, Elena Kagan and Martha Minow at Harvard Law School, Kathleen Sullivan at Stanford Law School, and the Hon. Kristin Booth Glenn and Michelle J. Anderson at the City University of New York School of Law).

== Personal life ==
Born in New York City, Joan Mahoney is the daughter of Beatrice Shishko and writer William B. Mahoney. She described herself as a "red diaper baby", having grown up in a leftist family. She received her B.A. and M.A. degrees at the University of Chicago, attended Wayne State Law School and received her J.D. there, and received a PhD. from Wolfson College, University of Cambridge in England. During her time at the University of Chicago she was a member of the University's chapter of the Congress of Racial Equality and participated in the University of Chicago sit-ins alongside Bernie Sanders. She subsequently participated in the Selma to Montgomery marches. A distinguished legal scholar, she has published widely on reproductive rights, constitutional law, legal history, comparative civil liberties, and bioethics, including, inter alia, with Dr. Keith Ewing and Andrew Moretta, MI 5, the Cold War, and the Rule of Law (Oxford University Press, 2020) https://global.oup.com/academic/product/mi5-the-cold-war-and-the-rule-of-law-9780198818625?cc=fr&lang=en&. After retiring, she moved to the UK, however after a few years she returned to academia and started teaching part-time at the University of Southampton. Her sister Martha R. Mahoney is a Professor of Law at the University of Miami School of Law and the author of numerous works on domestic violence and critical race theory.
