= John T. McManus =

American politician

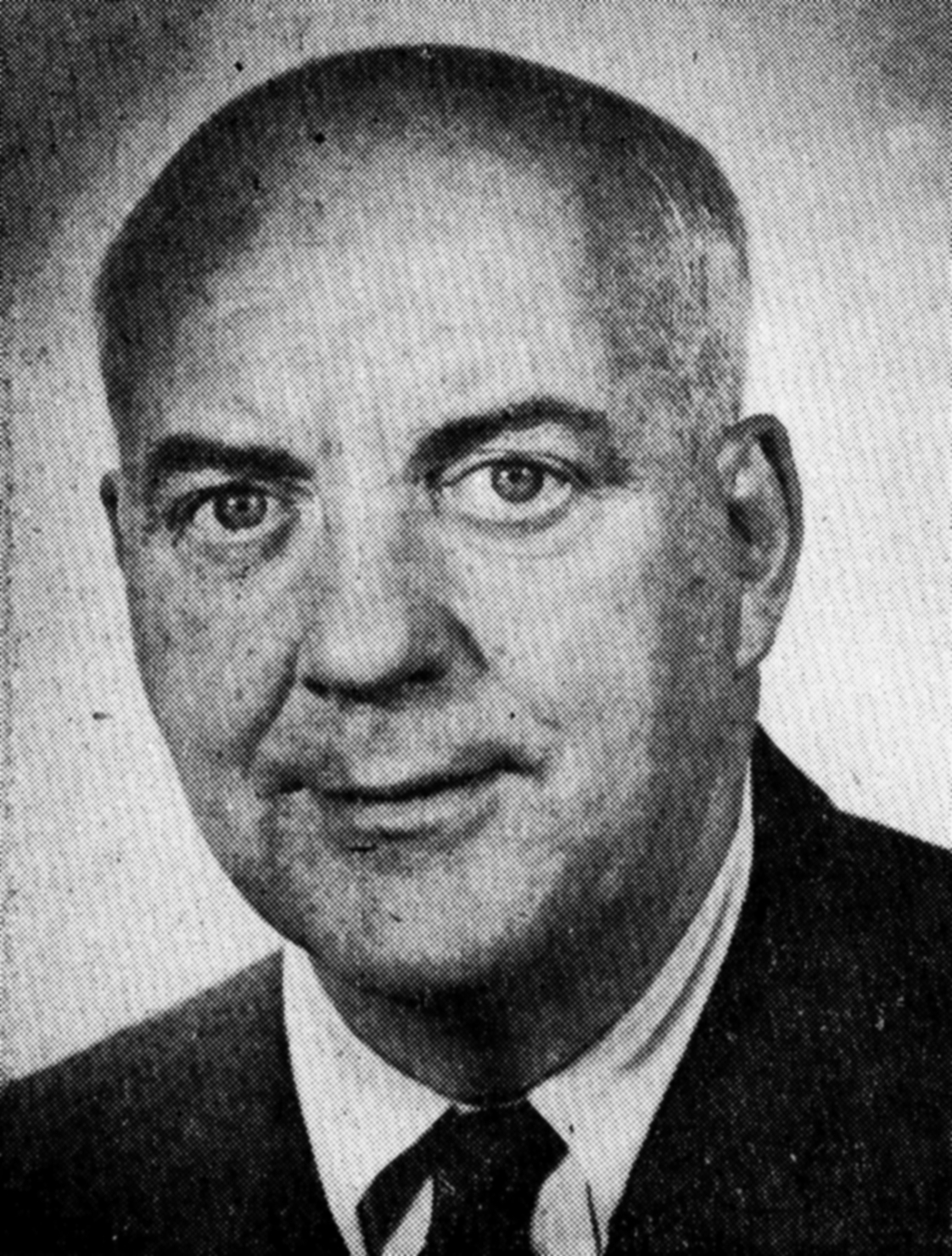
McManus c. 1958

John Thomas McManus (1904 – November 22, 1961) was an American journalist active in progressive politics in the 1950s and 1960s best known as co-founder of the National Guardian, a left-leaning newspaper.

== Early life and education ==
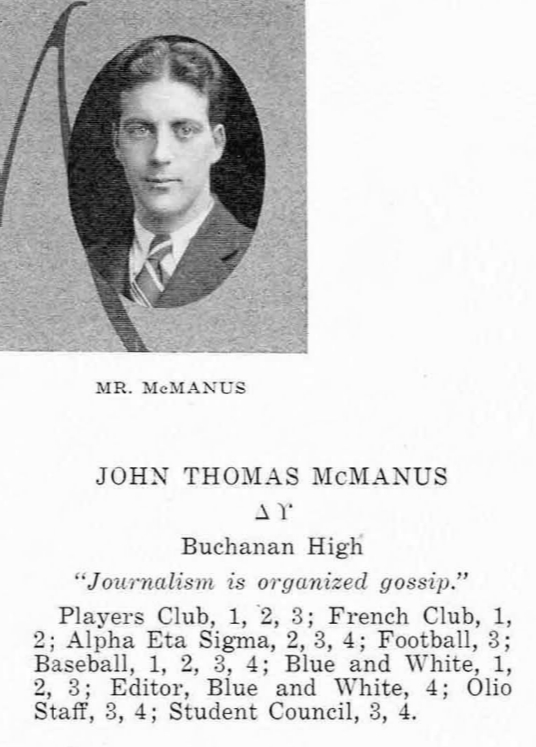
McManus in the Marietta College yearbook, 1929

John Thomas McManus was born in 1904 in New York City. He graduated from Marietta College in 1928.

== Career ==
In 1927, McManus started to work for The New York Times as a copy boy, police reporter, writer on bridge, and movie reviewer.

In 1937, McManus resigned from the Times to join the staff of Time magazine as radio critic. In 1940, William Saroyan lists him among "contributing editors" at Time in the play, Love's Old Sweet Song.

In the 1940s, McManus resigned to join the staff of PM, a left-of-center New York City daily.

In the postwar period, McManus was actively involved in electoral politics. In 1948, he served on the national committee of the Progressive Party in support of the presidential candidacy of former vice-president Henry A. Wallace. In 1950 and 1954, McManus ran for Governor of New York on the American Labor Party ticket. In 1958, he ran again for Governor of New York, this time on the Independent-Socialist ticket.

In 1949, McManus co-founded the National Guardian, a progressive newspaper, with fellow former Times writer James Aronson. The paper was critical of the Cold War and McCarthyism and supportive of the labor movement and racial equality. He would co-edit the paper until his death in 1961.

In November 1955, McManus and Aronson were among 26 former and current New York Times employees subpoenaed by the Senate Internal Security Subcommittee. The subcommittee was investigating Communist infiltration in the American media. The subpoenas were based upon the testimony of Winston Burdett, a famous CBS war correspondent. In 1956, McManus testified, citing Fifth Amendment protections to avoid naming names or admit any knowledge of Communist activities.

== Personal life and death ==
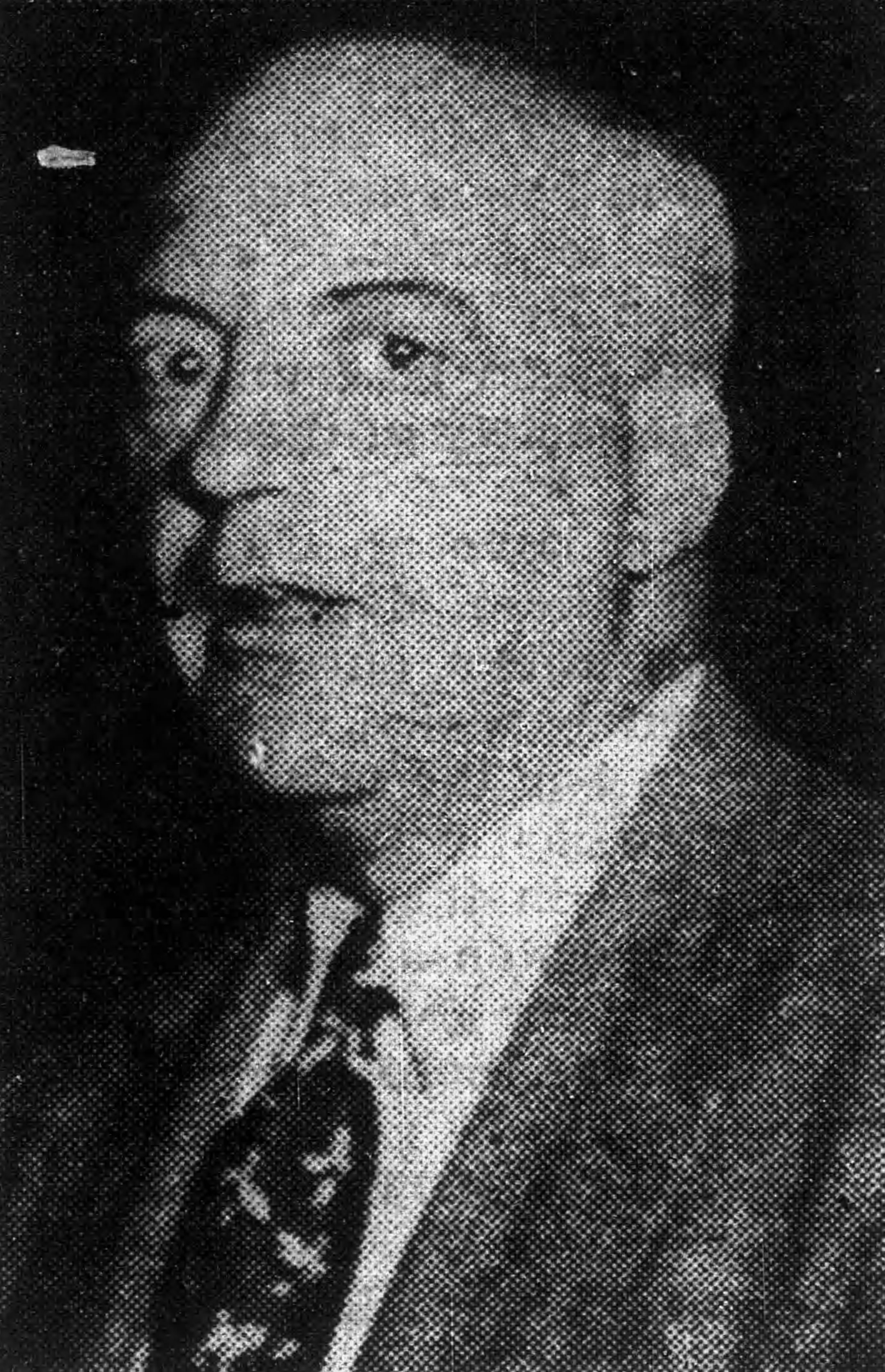
McManus, undated

McManus met his wife, journalist Jane Bedell McManus (ca. 1920–2005), while working at the National Guardian in the 1950s. They adopted two children, Enid Paul Mayberry and Sharon Mayberry, daughters of the previous Jane's husband, dr George Mayberry.

John Thomas McManus died age 56 in November 1961 of a heart attack. His wife moved in 1969 to Cuba to live with her third husband William Lee Brent, whom she met and married on the island, until her death.

== Works ==
- "M. Debalta, Reporter, Sees Ghosts," The New York Times, Aug. 15, 1937

== Legacy ==
In 1952, Whittaker Chambers mentioned McManus in a personal anecdote from the early 1940s:

Across the table from me was sitting John McManus, then Time's very fluent radio writer, later an American Labor Party candidate for Governor of New York. He stared at me balefully. "I should think your favorite movie," he said, "would be The Informer." A mighty armor is our innocence. Guilelessly, I agreed. The picturization of the novel by the brother of my old Daily Worker colleague, Tom O'Flaherty, was in fact one of my favorite movies. It was several minutes before I suddenly realized what McManus meant.

== See also ==
- National Guardian
