= Dean Lake (Crow Wing County, Minnesota) =

Lake in the state of Minnesota, United States

- Location within Minnesota
- Location: Crow Wing County, Minnesota
- Coordinates: 46°36′10″N 93°53′10″W
- Type: Lake
- Surface elevation: 1,211 feet (369 m)

Dean Lake is a lake in Crow Wing County, in the U.S. state of Minnesota.

Dean Lake was named for Joseph Dean, a lumberman who worked in the area.

== See also ==
- List of lakes in Minnesota
