= William A. Price =

American journalist (1915–2009)

William A. Price (April 20, 1915 – April 29, 2009) was an American journalist who worked as the United Nations correspondent and, later, police reporter for the New York Daily News from 1940-1955. He is one of many journalists to be fired and labeled as outcasts because of their alleged affiliations with the Communist Party.

== Military service ==
During WWII, Price flew planes for the U.S. Navy.

== Senate subpoena ==
Price was subpoenaed by and testified before the U.S. Senate Internal Security Subcommittee in November 1955. He was one of dozens of journalists who were subpoenaed in November 1955 due to Winston Burdett's testimony before the subcommittee earlier that summer.

Unlike some of the other writers and news employees called before the subcommittee Price avoided invoking the protections of the Fifth Amendment to avoid answering questions, instead standing behind the First Amendment. He simply refused to answer any questions, telling the subcommittee that they lacked jurisdiction to inquire about his political opinions. The Daily News Executive Editor Richard Clarke immediately fired Price by telegram, saying his testimony had "destroyed [his] usefulness" to the News.

His attempt to invoke the First Amendment was overruled by Senator James O. Eastland multiple times. Due to his testimony Price was indicted on charges of contempt of Congress, along with journalists Alden Whitman and Robert Shelton. Price was eventually convicted of the charge and was sentenced to three months in jail and a fine of $500.

== Personal life ==
Price was an activist for tenant rights on the Upper West Side of Manhattan for over forty years. He was a direct descendant of the American revolutionary William Henry and one of the founders of Scranton, Pennsylvania: Charles Scranton. His cousin, George Polk, a foreign correspondent for CBS, was honored on a U.S. postage stamp in 2008.
