= Deans Lake (Minnesota) =

Lake in the state of Minnesota, United States

- Location within Minnesota
- Location: Scott County
- Coordinates: 44°46′33″N 93°26′48″W
- Type: Lake
- Surface elevation: 748 feet (228 m)

Deans Lake is a lake in Scott County, in the U.S. state of Minnesota.

Deans Lake was named for Matthew Dean, a pioneer who settled near the lake in the 1850s.

== See also ==
- List of lakes in Minnesota
