= Dean Lake (Wright County, Minnesota) =

Lake in the state of Minnesota, United States

- Location within Minnesota
- Location: Wright County
- Coordinates: 45°7′14.5″N 93°50′3″W
- Type: Lake
- Surface elevation: 935 feet (285 m)

Dean Lake is a lake in Wright County, in the U.S. state of Minnesota.

Dean Lake was named for an early settler.

== See also ==
- List of lakes in Minnesota
