= Air Cargo News =

British aviation trade magazine

- Air Cargo News cover, Summer 2026
- Editor: Damian Brett
- Categories: Aviation
- Frequency: Quarterly (print) daily (online)
- Circulation: 10,727
- Founded: 1983; 43 years ago
- First issue: 16 March 1983; 43 years ago
- Company: ProMedia Group UK
- Country: United Kingdom
- Based in: Sutton, London
- Language: British English
- Website: www.aircargonews.net

Air Cargo News publishes industry newspapers and magazines and digital information for senior executives, managers and sales agents in the freight forwarding, airline, airport and cargo handling sector. It is based at Sutton in Surrey in the United Kingdom, and is part of ProMedia Group UK.

== Air Cargo News ==
Air Cargo News is an industry online newspaper and quarterly print trade magazine. There are regular contributions from respected industry journalists including Damian Brett, Rebecca Jeffrey, Roger Hailey and Ian Putzger.

== Events ==
- Cargo Airline of the Year is an annual award ceremony established in 1983. More than 25 000 supply chain professionals around the world vote for the best in the air logistics business. The awards are the only event where the British International Freight Association audits and approves the votes cast. American Airlines Cargo was voted Air Cargo News Cargo Airline of the Year in April 2015.
