= James Aronson =

American journalist (1915–1988)

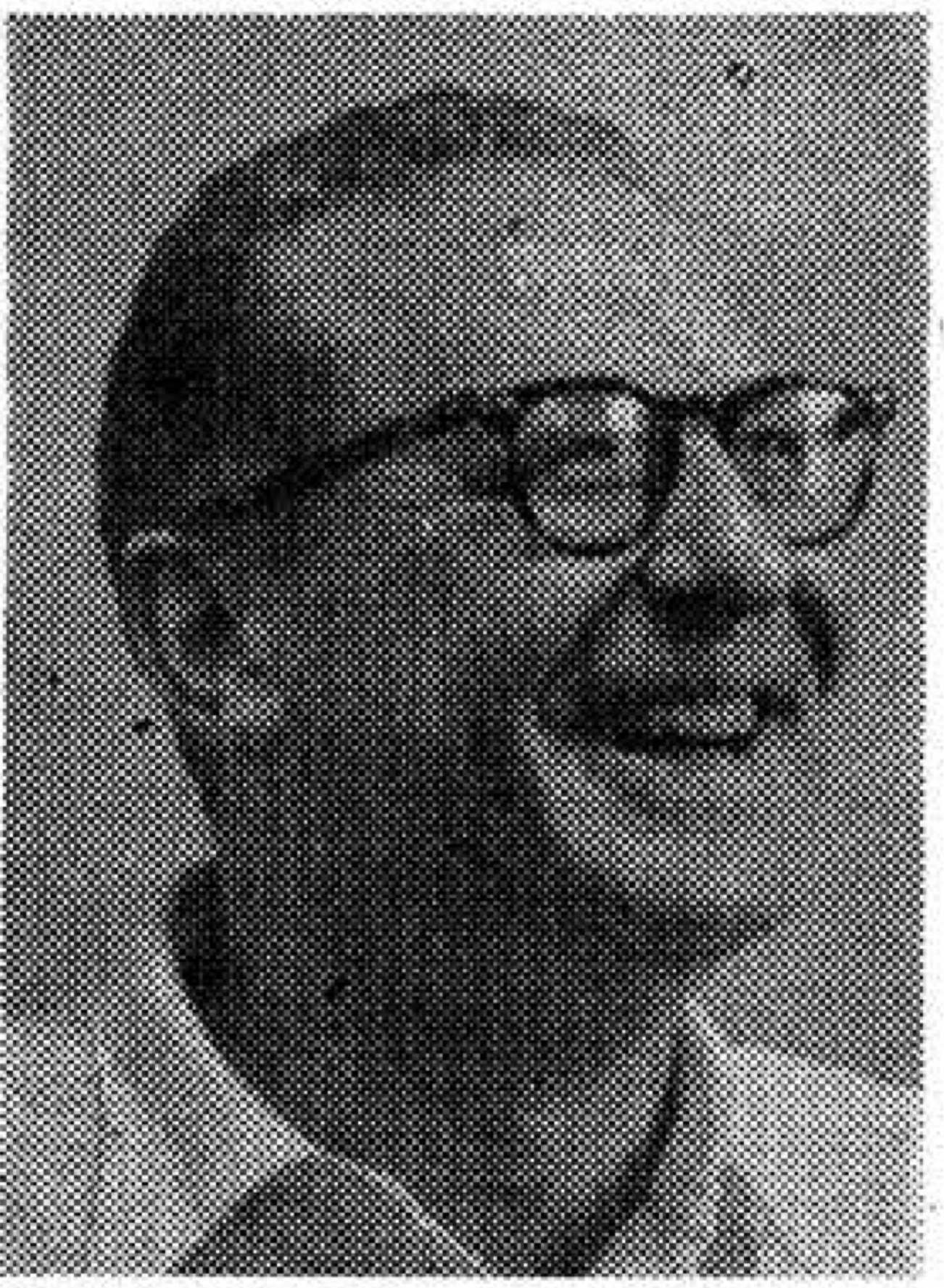
- Born: 1915
- Died: 1988 (aged 72–73)
- Education: Harvard College, Columbia University Graduate School of Journalism
- Occupation: Journalist

James Aronson (1915–1988) was an American journalist. He founded the National Guardian. He was a graduate of Harvard College and the Columbia University Graduate School of Journalism.

== Career ==
Aronson, known as "Jim" to his friends, worked at several publications prior to founding the National Guardian. He worked on the staffs of the Boston Evening Transcript, the New York Herald Tribune, the New York Post and The New York Times from 1946 to 1948.

Aronson founded the National Guardian in 1949 with John T. McManus and Cedric Belfrage. It continued publishing until 1992.

Aronson also worked as a professor at Hunter College of the City University of New York. In 1981 he was invited to mainland China to teach news-writing by the Chinese Academy of Social Sciences. Aronson was the first American to be invited to teach such classes since the Communists came to power in 1949. In China he found that the content and style were what the Maoist government wanted to change about Chinese journalism, not the purpose.

== Works ==
- The Press and the Cold War (1970)
- Something to Guard: The Stormy Life of the National Guardian, 1948-1967. With Cedric Belfrage. New York: Columbia University Press, 1978.
