= New Albany, Nova Scotia =

Community in Nova Scotia, Canada

Coordinates: 44°49′21.94″N 65°3′47.14″W

New Albany in Nova Scotia

New Albany is a community in the Canadian province of Nova Scotia, located in Annapolis County. It was probably named after Albany, New York.
