= National Guardian =

1948–1992 American weekly newspaper

- Independent radical newsweekly
- Typical front page of the National Guardian during the McCarthy era
- Type: weekly
- Format: tabloid
- Founder(s): James Aronson; Cedric Belfrage; John T. McManus
- Founded: 1948; 78 years ago
- Ceased publication: 1992; 34 years ago
- Political alignment: Socialism; Anti-militarism; New Left/Maoism (1968–1992)
- ISSN: 0362-5583
- OCLC number: 4564405

The National Guardian was a left-wing independent weekly newspaper established in 1948 in New York City. The paper was founded by James Aronson, Cedric Belfrage and John T. McManus in connection with the 1948 Presidential campaign of Henry A. Wallace under the Progressive Party banner. Although independent and often critical of all political parties, the National Guardian is thought to have been initially close to the ideological orbit of the pro-Moscow Communist Party USA, but this suspected association quickly broke down in the course of several years.

In February 1968, the newspaper's editorial staff was reorganized. The paper gradually turned towards a pro-Chinese and Maoist orientation and support of the New Communist Movement in the United States. During the early 1980s, the publication's ideological line shifted once again, this time towards an independent non-communist radicalism.

== History ==
=== Background ===
From the decade of the 1930s, the Communist Party USA (CPUSA) cast a long shadow as the largest Marxist political organization in the United States of America. In addition to a vast array of monthly, weekly, and daily publications in languages other than English, the Communist Party published an English-language daily newspaper in New York City, the Daily Worker. As an official organ of the CPUSA, this publication was constrained by tight central direction and rather mechanical adherence to the party's political line — factors which somewhat limited the paper's appeal to radical American intellectuals.

In 1945 an American plane carried a number of newspaper men to Germany, whose Nazi regime had recently been defeated in World War II. These were part of a "Psychological Warfare Division" consisting of American, British, and Canadian newspaper editors and writers given the task of purging those deemed as Nazi collaborators from the German newspaper industry and replacing them with a new crop of publishers, editors, and journalists with verifiable anti-fascist bona fides. Among these journalists tapped to help "denazify" the country through establishment of a democratic press were James Aronson, a resident of New York City, and Englishman Cedric Belfrage, a former theatre critic for the London Daily Express who had since the 1930s lived in Hollywood, California where he worked as a screenwriter.

United by radical political beliefs, the two journalists vaguely discussed establishing a new radical newspaper in the United States following their demobilization. This plan initially came to naught, however, as the two returned to the United States after their German mission and resumed their independent lives.

=== Progressive Party connection ===
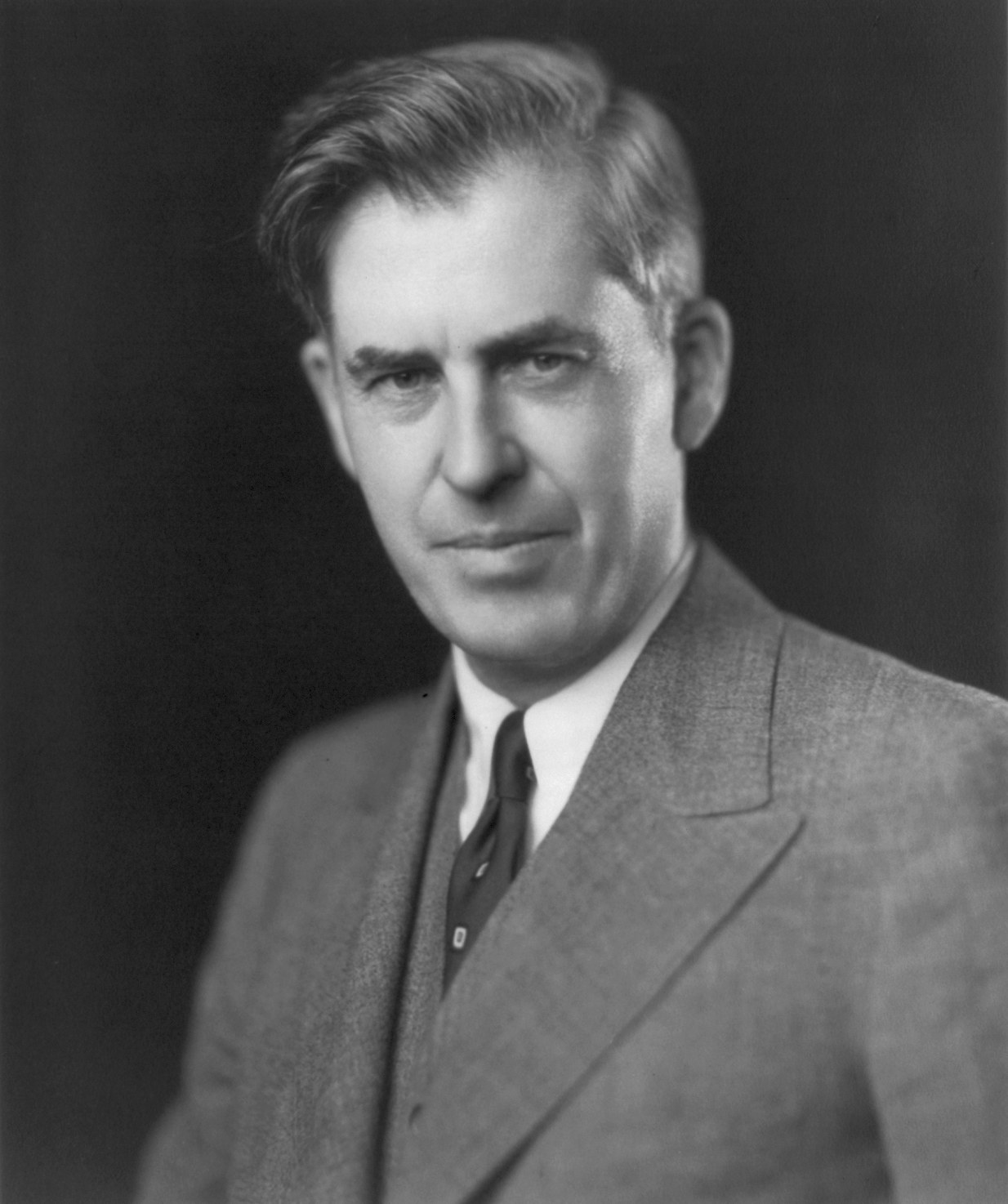
The National Guardian emerged in connection with the 1948 Presidential campaign of former Vice President Henry A. Wallace.

Many American liberal and intellectuals were deeply disaffected with president Harry S. Truman and his hardline anti-Soviet foreign policy and perceived lack of commitment to New Deal social programs and sought an electoral alternative in the 1948 presidential election. This took the form of a new political organization, the Progressive Party, which launched a national campaign with a ticket headed by former Vice President Henry A. Wallace. A broad political movement, backed by the CPUSA, emerged in support of Wallace's insurgent candidacy.

James Aronson and Cedric Belfrage were committed activists in the Wallace for President campaign and in the run-up to the Progressive Party nominating convention they renewed their acquaintance and revived plans for an independent radical newspaper in the United States. The duo were joined in this effort by John T. McManus, a former staff member of the liberal newspaper PM and former head of the left wing Newspaper Guild in the state of New York, and Josiah Gitt, publisher of a liberal newspaper in the town of York, Pennsylvania. In July 1948 these four — with Gitt listed as publisher and Aronson, Belfrage, and McManus as editors — launched a sample publication called The National Gazette and circulated it at the Progressive Party Nominating Convention.

Response to the proposed new weekly publication among the Progressive Party conventioneers was positive and several hundred pledges for subscriptions to the new publication were obtained. Gitt quickly dropped out of the effort, however, pleading lack of time to commit to the project, leaving Aronson, Belfrage, and McManus to finalize plans. In the publication that would emerge the three apportioned definite tasks among themselves, with Aronson taking the role of Executive Editor, Belfrage becoming Editor, and McManus assuming the position of Managing Editor.

=== Establishment ===
The first issue of the National Guardian saw print on October 18, 1948 — just three weeks before the November presidential election. In concert with the Wallace for President campaign, the paper proclaimed itself a "progressive weekly" and declared its support for "a continuation and development of the progressive tradition set in our time by Franklin D. Roosevelt", albeit with an unabashed socialist slant.

The paper's form initially owed a great deal to the weekly newsmagazine style pioneered by such conservative journalistic mainstays as Time and Newsweek, with regular sections on "The Nation," "The World," "Sports," and so forth, with the coverage of "Business" by the glossy magazines transformed into coverage of the labor movement under the header "Labor's Week" in the new publication. This subject-sectional approach favored by the glossy news weeklies was rapidly abandoned, with only a "Better Living" section surviving into the 1950s. The paper initially maintained no editorial page but editorialized freely with the published content, selecting and rewriting news stories from wire services and mainstream daily newspapers with a new radical focus.

Regular contributors to the National Guardian in its formative period included a broad range of Communist and non-party radicals, including NAACP founder W. E. B. Du Bois, writer Ring Lardner, Jr., economist Paul Sweezy, journalist Anna Louise Strong, activist Ella Winter, and others. The debut issue featured contributions by young novelist Norman Mailer, a supporter of the Progressive Party, as well as a piece written for the paper by head of the party's electoral ticket Henry Wallace. The paper became known for its original foreign coverage, with contributions not only from Strong but also from veteran radical journalists Agnes Smedley and Wilfred Burchett.

=== Circulation ===
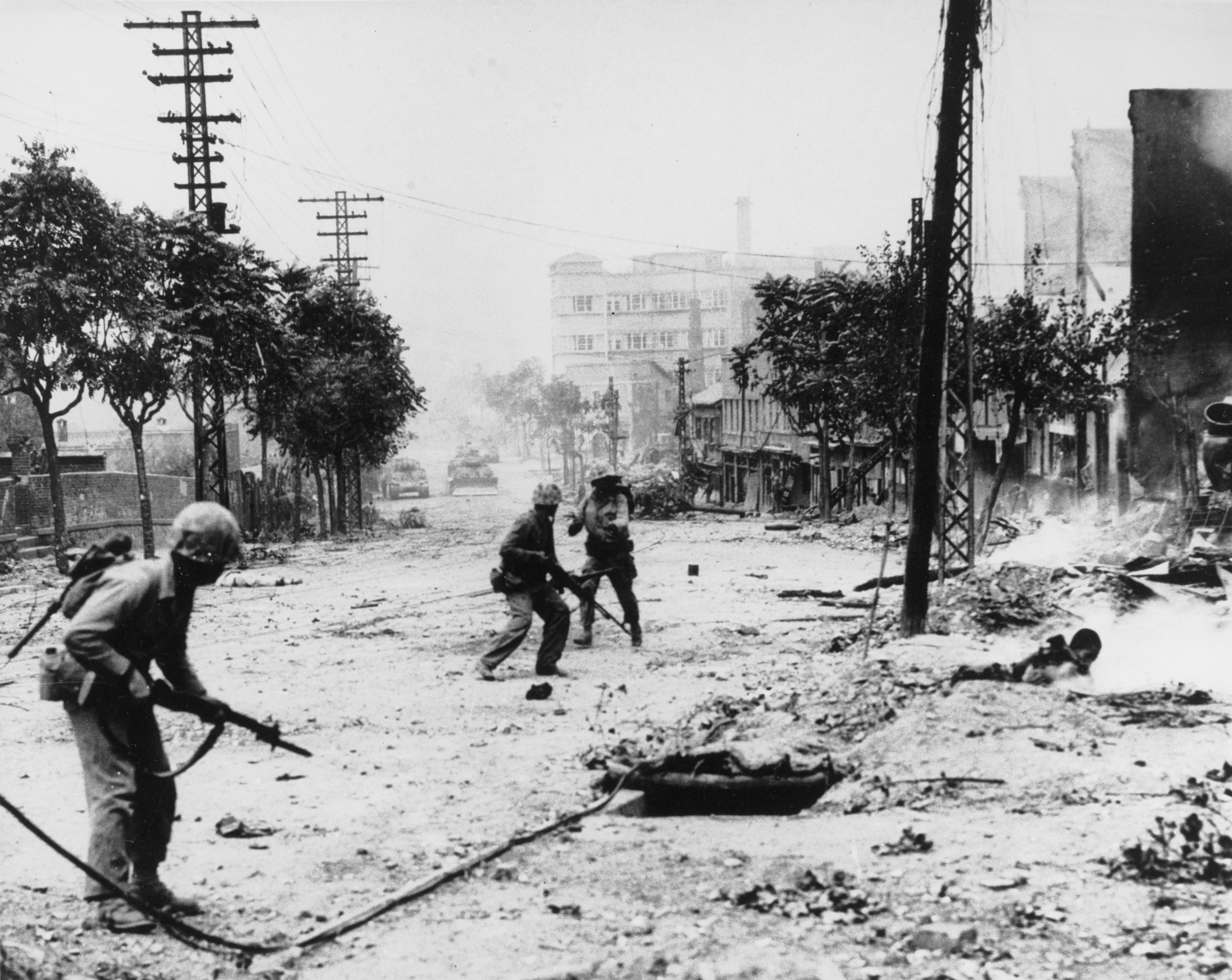
The National Guardian opposed the Korean War.

The National Guardian launched with a circulation of 5,000 and was initially received very positively, with its press run approaching the 100,000 mark by the end of the paper's first year. The editors envisioned continued growth and a lowering of the paper's cover price, with a view to establishment of an influential mass weekly with a circulation of 500,000 or even 1,000,000 copies. With over 1 million voters casting ballots for Henry Wallace in November 1948, such a goal seemed within realization, and the editors tied their hopes to the continued growth and success of the Progressive Party movement. Circulation peaked at 75,000 by 1950.

However, the paper's initial financial needs were met by a one-year subsidy provided by Anita McCormick Blaine, an heir to the McCormick Harvesting Machine Company fortune, which soon expired, leaving the editors in charge of a paper with a production cost of 12 cents an issue and a cover price of just 5 cents. The paper skipped issues and slashed pay of its office staff, barely surviving the financial crisis. The paper's cover price was hiked to 10 cents in an effort to balance costs and revenues.

In addition to falling returns, the National Guardian found its growth hampered by its connection to what was seen by many to be a faltering political movement. Seemingly damaged by its close linkage to the personality of defeated Presidential aspirant Henry Wallace and subjected to severe criticism for its suspected connections to the Communist Party, the Progressive Party dissolved in the 1950s. Similarly, the New York-based American Labor Party (ALP), a local organization strongly supported by the National Guardian, lost considerable support when its most popular figure, Congressman Vito Marcantonio, lost his reelection in 1950. An even greater blow was struck in 1950 with the advent of the Korean War — which the National Guardian vehemently opposed. Attacked for Communist sympathies or worse, circulation of the newspaper plummeted, falling to 50,000 by 1951.

A slow attrition of readership continued throughout the years of the "Second Red Scare" and McCarthyism, with circulation dipping to 45,000 in 1953; to 35,000 in 1957; and to just 29,000 in 1961.

=== Focus of coverage ===
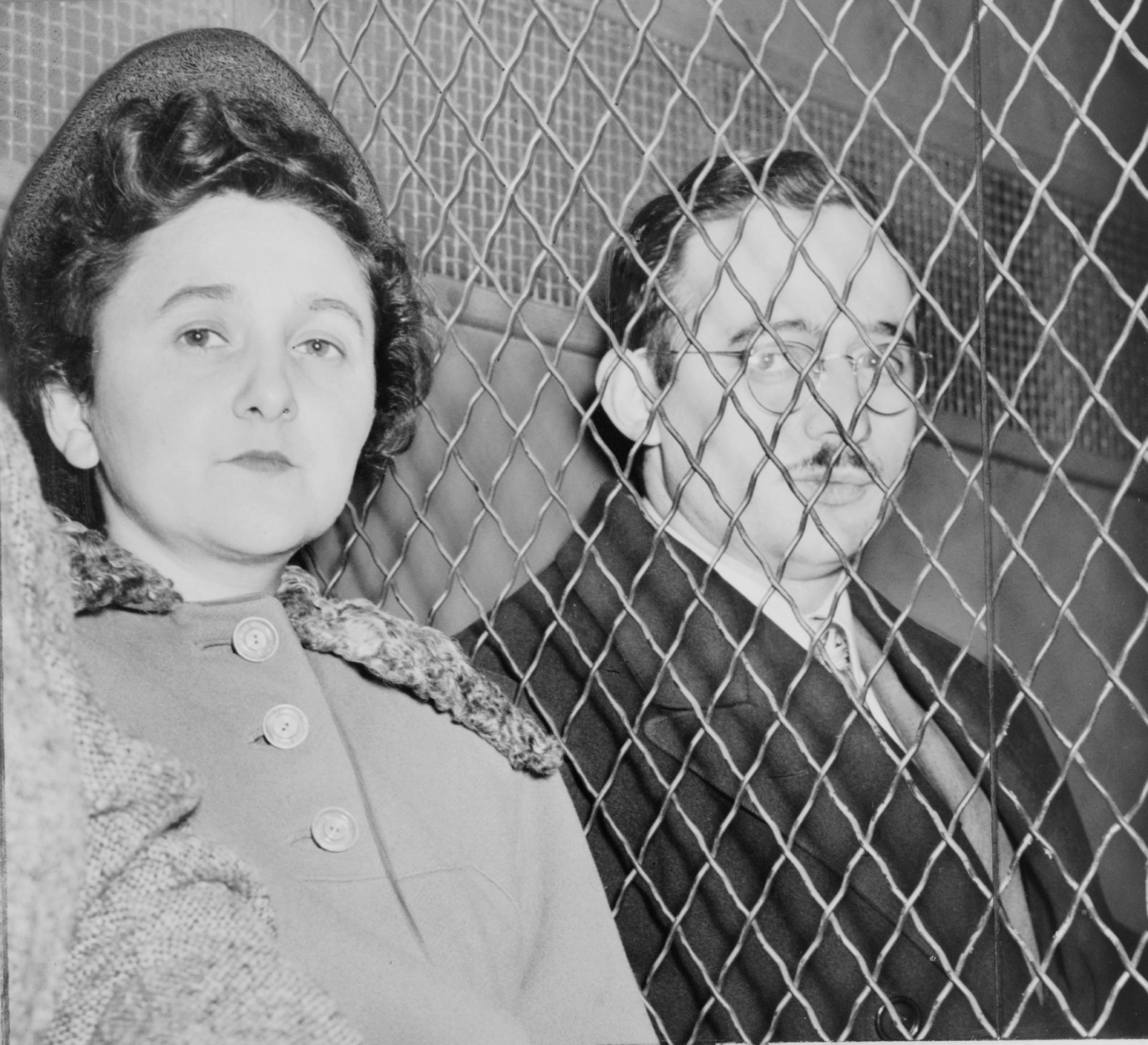
The National Guardian was influential in assisting the defense of accused Soviet spies Ethel and Julius Rosenberg, who were ultimately convicted and executed in June 1953.

The National Guardian revisited several themes with regularity in its news coverage throughout the 1950s and 1960s. Chief among these was the publication's opposition to the Cold War and militarism, with the paper serving as one of the few public voices that stood in opposition to the Korean War. The paper also supported emerging anti-colonial movements in Africa and Asia, with reporters dispatched abroad to provide first-hand coverage of these revolutionary movements.

The paper was also deeply involved in the defense of controversial American political figures during the McCarthy era, including Soviet spies Julius and Ethel Rosenberg and Alger Hiss, union leader and deportation target Harry Bridges, the blacklisted writers remembered as the Hollywood Ten, and jailed Communist Party leaders prosecuted under the Smith Act.

The National Guardian's coverage of the twists and turns of the Rosenberg case was particularly passionate, with the paper helping to coordinate the legal defense efforts on behalf of the jailed New Yorkers at a time when the Communist Party and its Daily Worker attempted to distance itself from the unpopular case. The paper was so closely tied to the Rosenberg defense that after the pair were executed on the electric chair for espionage, National Guardian editor James Aronson was named a trustee of the fund established on behalf of the couple's orphaned children. William A. Reuben, the National Guardian's main reporter on the Rosenberg case, later published an expanded version of his journalism in book form as The Atom Spy Hoax (1954).

A third area of emphasis for the National Guardian was the ongoing Civil Rights Movement in America, including ongoing coverage of efforts to integrate the educational system, to expand voting rights, to end discrimination in housing and employment, and to resist terrorist acts such as the murder of Emmett Till. As part of these efforts the paper forged close bonds with leading black intellectuals such as W. E. B. Du Bois and singer Paul Robeson.

Throughout it all the National Guardian maintained friendly ties with the Communist Party USA, generally advancing a similar pro-Soviet and anti-militarist political line. The paper differed with the Communist Party primarily on the question of independent political action, which the CPUSA had abandoned as futile during the 1950s but which the National Guardian continued to support. Additional separation took place after Khrushchev's Secret Speech of 1956, including support of Yugoslav independence from the Soviet bloc and efforts at honest coverage of purges in Eastern Europe and the Hungarian Revolution.

=== New name and new line ===
As the decade of the 1960s progressed, the United States government became deeply embroiled in the bloody and divisive Vietnam War, while the Civil Rights Movement intensified and radicalized with the emergence of Black nationalism and the Black Panther Party. A new radical youth movement emerged, typified by such groups as Students for a Democratic Society (SDS), the Student Nonviolent Coordinating Committee (SNCC), the Young Socialist Alliance, and the National Mobilization Committee to End the War in Vietnam. A reinvigorated feminist movement also exploded on the scene. This broad New Left tended to reject the cautious party politics approach of their Old Left forebears, favoring the direct action tactics of street protest.

The National Guardian evolved with these changes, but nevertheless developed its own internal strife between James Aronson and the publication's Old Left tradition with a new generation of explicitly revolutionary staffers, who sought to turn the paper into a more radical and activist publication. The break came in February 1968 when Aronson sold his National Guardian stock to the newspaper's staff and the paper was reorganized under new editorial leadership and a new name — The Guardian. Continuity with the earlier incarnation of the paper was limited, with radical foreign correspondents Anna Louise Strong in China and Wilfred Burchett in Southeast Asia continuing in their previous roles. Jack A. Smith began his 13-year stint as editor of the revamped paper as part of the change, stepping down only in 1981.

An intensified orientation towards revolutionary events in the People's Republic of China and the armed struggle against colonialism in the Third World came into vogue. With respect to domestic American coverage, the new Guardian shaped its activity around the slogan "The duty of a radical newspaper is to build a radical movement" attempting in particular to forge closer ties with SDS and SNCC. "We are movement people acting as journalists," the Guardian′s staff now proudly declared.

A factional split developed among the editorial staff in 1970, leading to the creation of a short-lived rival publication, the Liberated Guardian. This controversy severely impacted the original publication, with The Guardian′s circulation falling to just 14,000 in the aftermath.

=== Political organizing activities ===
In the 1970s, the Guardian began to outspokenly embrace a Marxist–Leninist ideology aligned with the Third-worldist and Maoist New Communist Movement, later orienting itself toward a political tendency known as The Trend. The paper editorially called for a new Marxist–Leninist party in the United States. The paper attempted to carve an independent role for itself, never formally aligning with any particular group and remaining critical of the plethora of small New Left party organizations which emerged after the demise of SDS in 1970. The traditional news-first approach of the original National Guardian was gradually attenuated in the paper's outspokenly revolutionary 1970s incarnation, with editorial and commentary material supplanting straight news reporting.

These party-building efforts ultimately failed, owing in some measure to the exhaustion of the Cultural Revolution in China as well as the lack of popular support for extreme political solutions and revolutionary phrasemaking in the United States. By the decade of the 1980s the paper had begun to moderate its tone, lending critical support to revolutionary movements of whatever stripe, without regard to the Sino-Soviet split, and opening its pages to a range of diverse views by a broad spectrum of political activists. Circulation recovered somewhat, floating in the 20,000 to 30,000 range throughout this interval.

== Organization ==
Correspondents included George Shaw Wheeler in Prague.

== See also ==
- Alternative media (U.S. political left)
- Progressive Party
- National Committee to Secure Justice in the Rosenberg Case
- New Communist Movement
