= Bad Pharma =

2012 book critical of the pharmaceutical industry

- Author: Ben Goldacre
- Subject: Pharmaceutical industry
- Publisher: Fourth Estate (UK), Faber & Faber (US), Signal (Canada)
- Publication date: 25 September 2012
- Media type: Print (Hardcover and Paperback)
- Pages: 430 (first edition)
- ISBN: 978-0-00-735074-2
- Preceded by: Bad Science

Bad Pharma: How Drug Companies Mislead Doctors and Harm Patients is a book by the British physician and academic Ben Goldacre about the pharmaceutical industry, its relationship with the medical profession, and the extent to which it controls academic research into its own products. It was published in the UK in September 2012 by the Fourth Estate imprint of HarperCollins, and in the United States in February 2013 by Faber and Faber.

Goldacre argues in the book that "the whole edifice of medicine is broken", because the evidence on which it is based is systematically distorted by the pharmaceutical industry. (Note: Goldacre, 2012: "Medicine is broken ... We like to imagine that medicine is based on evidence, and the results of fair tests. In reality, those tests are often profoundly flawed. We like to imagine that doctors are familiar with the research literature, when in reality much of it is hidden from them by drug companies. We like to imagine that doctors are well-educated, when in reality much of their education is funded by industry. We like to imagine that regulators only let effective drugs onto the market, when in reality they approve hopeless drugs, with data on side effects casually withheld from doctors and patients. "I'm going to tell you how medicine works ... We're going to see that the whole edifice of medicine is broken, because the evidence we use to make decisions is hopelessly and systematically distorted ...") He writes that the industry finances most of the clinical trials into its own products and much of doctors' continuing education, that clinical trials are often conducted on small groups of unrepresentative subjects and negative data is routinely withheld, and that apparently independent academic papers may be planned and even ghostwritten by pharmaceutical companies or their contractors, without disclosure. Describing the situation as a "murderous disaster", he makes suggestions for action by patients' groups, physicians, academics and the industry itself.

Responding to the book's publication, the Association of the British Pharmaceutical Industry issued a statement in 2012 arguing that the examples the book offers were historical, that the concerns had been addressed, that the industry is among the most regulated in the world, and that it discloses all data in accordance with international standards.

In January 2013 Goldacre joined the Cochrane Collaboration, British Medical Journal and others in setting up AllTrials, a campaign calling for the results of all past and current clinical trials to be reported. The British House of Commons Public Accounts Committee expressed concern in January 2014 that drug companies were still only publishing around 50 percent of clinical-trial results.

== Synopsis ==
=== Introduction ===
Goldacre writes in the introduction of Bad Pharma that he aims to defend the following:

Drugs are tested by the people who manufacture them, in poorly designed trials, on hopelessly small numbers of weird, unrepresentative patients, and analysed using techniques which are flawed by design, in such a way that they exaggerate the benefits of treatments. Unsurprisingly, these trials tend to produce results that favour the manufacturer. When trials throw up results that companies don't like, they are perfectly entitled to hide them from doctors and patients, so we only ever see a distorted picture of any drug's true effects. Regulators see most of the trial data, but only from early on in a drug's life, and even then they don't give this data to doctors or patients, or even to other parts of government. This distorted evidence is then communicated and applied in a distorted fashion.

In their forty years of practice after leaving medical school, doctors hear about what works through ad hoc oral traditions, from sales reps, colleagues or journals. But those colleagues can be in the pay of drug companies – often undisclosed – and the journals are too. And so are the patient groups. And finally, academic papers, which everyone thinks of as objective, are often covertly planned and written by people who work directly for the companies, without disclosure. Sometimes whole academic journals are even owned outright by one drug company. Aside from all this, for several of the most important and enduring problems in medicine, we have no idea what the best treatment is, because it's not in anyone's financial interest to conduct any trials at all.

=== Chapter 1: "Missing Data" ===
In "Missing Data," Goldacre argues that the clinical trials undertaken by drug companies routinely reach conclusions favourable to the company. For example, in a 2007 journal article published in PLOS Medicine, researchers studied every published trial on statins, drugs prescribed to reduce cholesterol levels. In the 192 trials they looked at, industry-funded trials were 20 times more likely to produce results that favoured the drug.

He writes that these positive results are achieved in a number of ways. Sometimes the industry-sponsored studies are flawed by design (for example by comparing the new drug to an existing drug at an inadequate dose), and sometimes patients are selected to make a positive result more likely. In addition, the data are analysed as the trial progresses. If the trial seems to be producing negative data it is stopped prematurely and the results are not published, or if it is producing positive data it may be stopped early so that longer-term effects are not examined. He writes that this publication bias, where negative results remain unpublished, is endemic within medicine and academia. As a consequence, he argues, doctors may have no idea what the effects are of the drugs they prescribe.

An example he gives of the difficulty of obtaining missing data from drug companies is that of oseltamivir (Tamiflu), manufactured by Roche to reduce the complications of bird flu. Governments spent billions of pounds stockpiling this, based in large part on a meta-analysis that was funded by the industry. Bad Pharma charts the efforts of independent researchers, particularly Tom Jefferson of the Cochrane Collaboration Respiratory Group, to gain access to information about the drug.

=== Chapter 2: "Where Do New Drugs Come From?" ===
In the second chapter, the book describes the process as new drugs move from animal testing through phase 1 (first-in-man study), phase 2, and phase 3 clinical trials. Phase 1 participants are referred to as volunteers, but in the US are paid $200–$400 per day, and because studies can last several weeks and subjects may volunteer several times a year, earning potential becomes the main reason for participation. Participants are usually taken from the poorest groups in society, and outsourcing increasingly means that trials may be conducted in countries with low wages by contract research organizations (CROs). The rate of growth for clinical trials in India is 20 percent a year, in Argentina 27 percent, and in China 47 percent, while trials in the UK have fallen by 10 percent a year and in the US by six percent.

The shift to outsourcing raises issues about data integrity, regulatory oversight, language difficulties, the meaning of informed consent among a much poorer population, the standards of clinical care, the extent to which corruption may be regarded as routine in certain countries, and the ethical problem of raising a population's expectations for drugs that most of that population cannot afford. It also raises the question of whether the results of clinical trials using one population can invariably be applied elsewhere. There are both social and physical differences: Goldacre asks whether patients diagnosed with depression in China are really the same as patients diagnosed with depression in California, and notes that people of Asian descent metabolize drugs differently from Westerners.

There have also been cases of available treatment being withheld during clinical trials. In 1996 in Kano, Nigeria, the drug company Pfizer compared a new antibiotic during a meningitis outbreak to a competing antibiotic that was known to be effective at a higher dose than was used during the trial. Goldacre writes that 11 children died, divided almost equally between the two groups. The families taking part in the trial were apparently not told that the competing antibiotic at the effective dose was available from Médecins Sans Frontières in the next-door building.

=== Chapter 3: "Bad Regulators" ===
Chapter three describes the concept of "regulatory capture," whereby a regulator – such as the Medicines and Healthcare products Regulatory Agency (MHRA) in the UK, or the Food and Drug Administration (FDA) in the United States – ends up advancing the interests of the drug companies rather than the interests of the public. Goldacre writes that this happens for a number of reasons, including the revolving door of employees between the regulator and the companies, and the fact that friendships develop between regulator and company employees simply because they have knowledge and interests in common. The chapter also discusses surrogate outcomes and accelerated approval, and the difficulty of having ineffective drugs removed from the market once they have been approved. He argues that regulators do not require that new drugs offer an improvement over what is already available, or even that they be particularly effective.

=== Chapter 4: "Bad Trials" ===
"Bad Trials" examines the ways in which clinical trials can be flawed. Goldacre writes that this happens by design and by analysis, and that it has the effect of maximizing a drug's benefits and minimizing harm. There have been instances of fraud, though he says these are rare. More common are what he calls the "wily tricks, close calls, and elegant mischief at the margins of acceptability."

These include testing drugs on unrepresentative, "freakishly ideal" patients; comparing new drugs to something known to be ineffective, or effective at a different dose or if used differently; conducting trials that are too short or too small; and stopping trials early or late. It also includes measuring uninformative outcomes; packaging the data so that it is misleading; ignoring patients who drop out (i.e. using per-protocol analysis, where only patients who complete the trial are counted in the final results, rather than intention-to-treat analysis, where everyone who starts the trial is counted); changing the main outcome of the trial once it has finished; producing subgroup analyses that show apparently positive outcomes for certain tightly defined groups (such as Chinese men between the ages of 56 and 71), thereby hiding an overall negative outcome; and conducting "seeding trials," where the objective is to persuade physicians to use the drug.

Another criticism is that outcomes are presented in terms of relative risk reduction to exaggerate the apparent benefits of the treatment. For example, he writes, if four people out of 1,000 will have a heart attack within the year, but on statins only two will, that is a 50 percent reduction if expressed as relative risk reduction. But if expressed as absolute risk reduction, it is a reduction of just 0.2 percent.

=== Chapter 5: "Bigger, Simpler Trials" ===
In chapter five Goldacre suggests using the General Practice Research Database in the UK, which contains the anonymized records of several million patients, to conduct randomized trials to determine the most effective of competing treatments. For example, to compare two statins, atorvastatin and simvastatin, doctors would randomly assign patients to one or the other. The patients would be followed up by having data about their cholesterol levels, heart attacks, strokes and deaths taken from their computerized medical records. The trials would not be blind – patients would know which statin they had been prescribed – but Goldacre writes that they would be unlikely to hold such firm beliefs about which one is preferable to the extent that it could affect their health.

=== Chapter 6: "Marketing" ===
In the final chapter, Goldacre looks at how doctors are persuaded to prescribe "me-too drugs," brand-name drugs that are no more effective than significantly cheaper off-patent ones. He cites as examples the statins atorvastatin (Lipitor, made by Pfizer) and simvastatin (Zocor), which he writes seem to be equally effective, or at least there is no evidence to suggest otherwise. Simvastatin came off patent several years ago, yet there are still three million prescriptions a year in the UK for atorvastatin, costing the National Health Service (NHS) an annual £165 million extra.

He addresses the issue of medicalization of certain conditions (or, as he argues, of personhood), whereby pharmaceutical companies "widen the boundaries of diagnosis" before offering solutions. Female sexual dysfunction was highlighted in 1999 by a study published in the Journal of the American Medical Association, which alleged that 43 percent of women were suffering from it. After the article appeared, the New York Times wrote that two of its three authors had worked as consultants for Pfizer, which at the time was preparing to launch UK-414,495, known as female Viagra. The journal's editor said that the failure to disclose the relationship with Pfizer was the journal's mistake.

The chapter also examines celebrity endorsement of certain drugs, the extent to which claims in advertisements aimed at doctors are appropriately sourced, and whether direct-to-consumer advertising (currently permitted in the US and New Zealand) ought to be allowed. It discusses how PR firms promote stories from patients who complain in the media that certain drugs are not made available by the funder, which in the UK is the NHS and the National Institute for Health and Clinical Excellence (NICE). Two breast-cancer patients who campaigned in the UK in 2006 for trastuzumab (Herceptin) to be available on the NHS were being handled by a law firm working for Roche, the drug's manufacturer. The historian Lisa Jardine, who was suffering from breast cancer, told the Guardian that she had been approached by a PR firm working for the company.

The chapter also covers the influence of drug reps, how ghostwriters are employed by the drug companies to write papers for academics to publish, how independent the academic journals really are, how the drug companies finance doctors' continuing education, and how patients' groups are often funded by industry.

=== Afterword: "Better Data" ===
In the afterword and throughout the book, Goldacre makes suggestions for action by doctors, medical students, patients, patient groups and the industry. He advises doctors, nurses and managers to stop seeing drug reps, to ban them from clinics, hospitals and medical schools, to declare online and in waiting rooms all gifts and hospitality received from the industry, and to remove all drug company promotional material from offices and waiting rooms. (He praises the website of the American Medical Student Association – www.amsascorecard.org – which ranks institutions according to their conflict-of-interest policies, writing that it makes him "feel weepy.") He also suggests that regulations be introduced to prevent pharmacists from sharing doctors' prescribing records with drug reps.

He asks academics to lobby their universities and academic societies to forbid academics from being involved in ghostwriting, and to lobby for "film credit" contributions at the end of every academic paper, listing everyone involved, including who initiated the idea of publishing the paper. He also asks for full disclosure of all past clinical trial results, and a list of academic papers that were, as he puts it, "rigged" by industry, so that they can be retracted or annotated. He asks drug company employees to become whistleblowers, either by writing an anonymous blog, or by contacting him.

He advises patients to ask their doctors whether they accept drug-company hospitality or sponsorship, and if so to post details in their waiting rooms, and to make clear whether it is acceptable to the patient for the doctor to discuss his or her medical history with drug reps. Patients who are invited to take part in a trial are advised to ask, among other things, for a written guarantee that the trial has been publicly registered, and that the main outcome of the trial will be published within a year of its completion. He advises patient groups to write to drug companies with the following: "We are living with this disease; is there anything at all that you're withholding? If so, tell us today."

== Reception ==
The book was generally well received. The Economist described it as "slightly technical, eminently readable, consistently shocking, occasionally hectoring and unapologetically polemical". Helen Lewis in the New Statesman called it an important book, while Luisa Dillner, writing in the Guardian, described it as a "thorough piece of investigative medical journalism".

Andrew Jack wrote in the Financial Times that Goldacre is "at his best in methodically dissecting poor clinical trials. ... He is less strong in explaining the complex background reality, such as the general constraints and individual slips of regulators and pharma companies' employees." Jack also argued that the book failed to reflect how many lives have been improved by the current system, for example with new treatments for HIV, rheumatoid arthritis and cancer.

Max Pemberton, a psychiatrist, wrote in the Daily Telegraph that "this is a book to make you enraged ... because it's about how big business puts profits over patient welfare, allows people to die because they don't want to disclose damning research evidence, and the tricks they play to make sure doctors do not have all the evidence when it comes to appraising whether a drug really works or not."

The Association of the British Pharmaceutical Industry (ABPI) replied in the New Statesman that Goldacre was "stuck in a bygone era where pharmaceutical companies wine and dine doctors in exchange for signing on the dotted line". The ABPI issued a press release, writing that the pharmaceutical industry is responsible for the discovery of 90 percent of all medicines, and that it takes an average of 10–12 years and £1.1bn to introduce a medicine to the market, with just one in 5,000 new compounds receiving regulatory approval. This makes research and development an expensive and risky business. They wrote that the industry is one of the most heavily regulated in the world, and is committed to ensuring full transparency in the research and development of new medicines. They also maintained that the examples Goldacre offered were "long documented and historical, and the companies concerned have long addressed these issues". Goldacre argues in the book that "the most dangerous tactic of all is the industry's enduring claim that these problems are all in the past".

Humphrey Rang of the British Pharmacological Society wrote that Goldacre had chosen his target well and had produced some shocking examples of secrecy and dishonesty, particularly the nondisclosure of data on the antidepressant reboxetine (chapter one), in which only one trial out of seven was published (the published study showed positive results, while the unpublished trials suggested otherwise). He argued that Goldacre had gone "over the top" in devoting a whole chapter (chapter five) to recommending large clinical trials using electronic patient data from general practitioners, without fully pointing out how problematic these can be; such trials raise issues, for example, about informed consent and regulatory oversight. Rang also criticized Goldacre's style, describing the book as too long, repetitive, hyperbolic, and in places too conversational. He particularly objected to the line, "medicine is broken", calling it a "foolish remark".

== AllTrials ==
Following the book's publication, Goldacre co-founded AllTrials with David Tovey, editor-in-chief of the Cochrane Library, together with the British Medical Journal, the Centre for Evidence-Based Medicine, and others in the UK, and Dartmouth College's Geisel School of Medicine and the Dartmouth Institute for Health Policy and Clinical Practice in the US. Set up in January 2013, the group campaigns for all past and current clinical trials to be registered and reported, for all treatments in use.

The British House of Commons Public Accounts Committee produced a report in January 2014, after hearing evidence from Goldacre, Fiona Godlee, editor-in-chief of the British Medical Journal, and others, about the stockpiling of Tamiflu and the withholding of data about the drug by its manufacturer, Roche. The committee said it was "surprised and concerned" to learn that information from clinical trials is routinely withheld from doctors, and recommended that the Department of Health take steps to ensure that all clinical-trial data be made available for currently prescribed treatments.

== Publication details ==
- Bad Pharma: How drug companies mislead doctors and harm patients, Fourth Estate, 2012 (UK). ISBN 978-0-00-735074-2
- Faber and Faber, 2013 (US). ISBN 978-0-86547-800-8
- Signal, 2013 (Canada). ISBN 978-0-7710-3629-3
- As of December 2012 foreign rights had been sold for Brazil, the Czech Republic, Netherlands, Germany, Israel, Italy, Korea, Norway, Poland, Portugal, Spain and Turkey.

== See also ==
Books

- Anatomy of an Epidemic (2010) by Robert Whitaker
- Big Pharma (2006) by Jacky Law
- Deadly Medicines and Organised Crime (2013) by Peter C. Gøtzsche
- Pharmageddon (2012) by David Healy (psychiatrist)
- Side Effects (2008) by Alison Bass

Lists

- Lists about the pharmaceutical industry
- List of books about the politics of science
- List of pharmaceutical companies
- List of largest pharmaceutical settlements

Miscellaneous

- Ethics in pharmaceutical sales
- Pharmaceutical fraud
- Pharmaceutical industry in the UK
- GlaxoSmithKline#2012 criminal and civil settlement
- Rosiglitazone
- Study 329
- TGN1412
