= Sense about Science =

British non-profit organisation

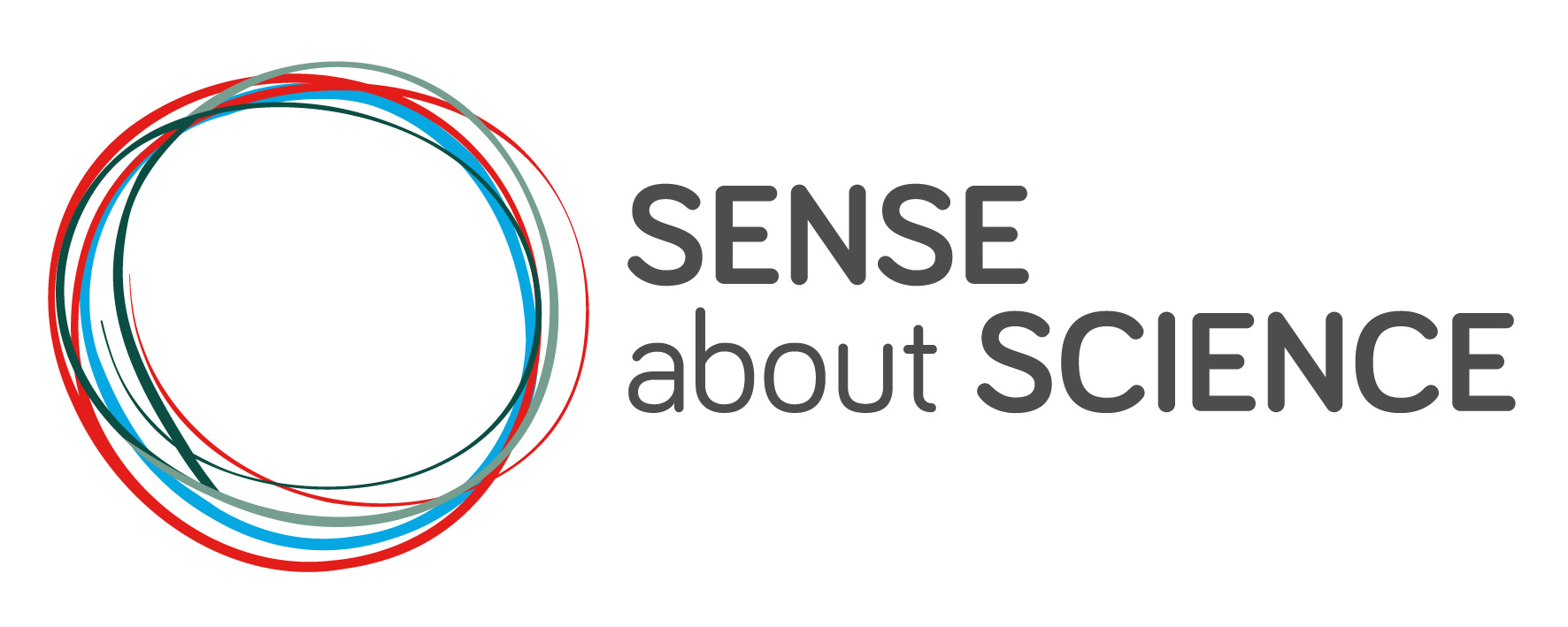
- Founded: 2002
- Founder: Lord Taverne
- Type: Charitable trust No.1146170
- Location: London, Brussels, Dublin
- Region served: Europe
- Key people: Simon Denegri OBE (Chair); Tracey Brown (Chief Executive)
- Revenue: £520,134 (2018)
- Employees: 11 (2018)
- Volunteers: 40 (2018)
- Website: senseaboutscience.org

Sense about Science is a United Kingdom charitable organization that promotes the public understanding of science. Sense about Science was founded in 2002 by Lord Taverne, Bridget Ogilvie, and others to promote respect for scientific evidence and good science. It was established as a charitable trust in 2003, with 14 trustees, an advisory council and a small office staff. Tracey Brown has been the Chief Executive since 2002.

The organisation works with scientists and journalists to put scientific evidence in public discussions about science, and to correct unscientific misinformation. They encourage and assist scientists to engage in public debates about their area of expertise, to respond to scientifically inaccurate claims in the media, to help people contact scientists with appropriate expertise, and to prepare briefings about the scientific background to issues of public concern.

== Projects ==
Sense about Science publishes guides to different areas of science in partnership with experts. These include: Responsible Handover Framework, Data Science: A Guide for Society, Making Sense of Nuclear, Making Sense of Uncertainty, Making Sense of Allergies, Making Sense of Drug Safety Science, Making Sense of Testing, Making Sense of Crime, Making Sense of Statistics, Making Sense of Screening and Making Sense of GM.

Sense about Science runs the Voice of Young Science (VoYS) programme to support early-career researchers build their skills and confidence in talking about their research and engage with the public, policy and media. The delivery of the programme - which includes workshops, resources and networking opportunities, is supported by partner universities and institutions such as the University of Edinburgh, Norwich Research Park, and the Society for Experimental Biology, among others.

Since its founding, Sense about Science has contributed to UK public debates about such subjects as alternative medicine, "detoxification" products and detox diets, genetically modified food, avian influenza, chemicals and health, "electrosmog", vaccination, weather and climate, nuclear power, and the use and utility of peer review. Sense about Science encourages scientists to explain to the public the value of peer review in determining which reports should be taken seriously. Director Tracey Brown describes such critical thinking as crucial to preventing public health scares based on unpublished information.

== Causes ==
Sense About Science launched the Ask for Evidence campaign in 2011 to help people request for themselves the evidence behind news stories, marketing claims and policies.

=== AllTrials ===
The AllTrials campaign calls for all past and present clinical trials to be registered and their full methods and summary results reported.

AllTrials is an international initiative of Bad Science, BMJ, Centre for Evidence-based Medicine, Cochrane Collaboration, James Lind Initiative, PLOS and Sense About Science and is being led in the US by Sense About Science USA, Dartmouth's Geisel School of Medicine and the Dartmouth Institute for Health Policy & Clinical Practice.

As of January 2018, the AllTrials petition has been signed by 91,989 people and 737 organisations.

=== Ask for Evidence ===
Ask for Evidence was launched by Sense About Science in 2011. It is a campaign that helps people request for themselves the evidence behind news stories, marketing claims and policies. When challenged in this way, organisations may withdraw their claims or send evidence to support them. The campaign is supported by more than 6000 volunteer scientists who are available to review the evidence provided and determine whether it supports the original claim or story. The campaign has received funding from The Wellcome Trust and is endorsed by figures such as Dara Ó Briain and Derren Brown.

=== Keep Libel Laws Out of Science ===
Sense About Science launched the Keep Libel Laws out of Science campaign in June 2009 in defence of a member of its board of trustees, author and journalist Simon Singh, who has been sued for libel by the British Chiropractic Association. They issued a statement entitled "The law has no place in scientific disputes", which was signed by many people representing science, medicine, journalism, publishing, arts, humanities, entertainment, sceptics, campaign groups and law. In April 2010, the BCA lost this case with the court accepting that criticism of the BCA concerning its promotion of bogus treatments was fair comment.

In December 2009, Sense About Science, Index on Censorship and English PEN launched the Libel Reform Campaign. The Defamation Act 2013 received Royal Assent on 25 April 2013 and came into force on 1 January 2014.

The Trust actively campaigns in support of various causes. It has issued a statement signed by over 35 scientists asking the WHO to condemn homeopathy for diseases such as HIV.

== Reception ==
Sense about Science and their publications have been cited a number of times in the popular press, most notably for encouraging celebrities and the public to think critically about scientific claims, criticizing marketing unsupported by research, decrying the unsubstantiated claims of homeopathy, supporting genetically modified crops, criticising "do-it-yourself" health testing, denouncing detox products, warning against "miracle cures", and promoting public understanding of peer review. They have received positive coverage in publications from the Royal Society and the U.S. National Science Foundation, and in the writings of scientists such as Ben Goldacre and Steven Novella.

Lord Taverne, former chairman of Sense About Science, has criticised campaigns to ban plastic bags as counter-productive and being based on "bad science".

Anti-genetic-modification campaigners and academics have criticised Sense About Science for what they view as a failure to disclose industry connections of some advisers, and Private Eye reported that it had seen a draft of the Making Sense of GM guide that included Monsanto Company's former director of scientific affairs as an author. Tracey Brown, managing director of Sense About Science, rebutted these claims on the Science about Science website.

Homeopath Peter Fisher criticised Sense About Science, who have been working closely with NHS primary care trusts on the issue of funding for homeopathy, for being funded by the pharmaceutical industry; Sense About Science responded in a statement to Channel 4 News that "Peter Fisher's desperate comments show about as much grasp of reality as the homeopathic medicine he sells."

A 2016 piece in The Intercept was critical of Sense About Science's data on and support for flame retardant chemicals.
