= David Healy (psychiatrist) =

Irish-born pharmacologist

David Healy FRCPsych
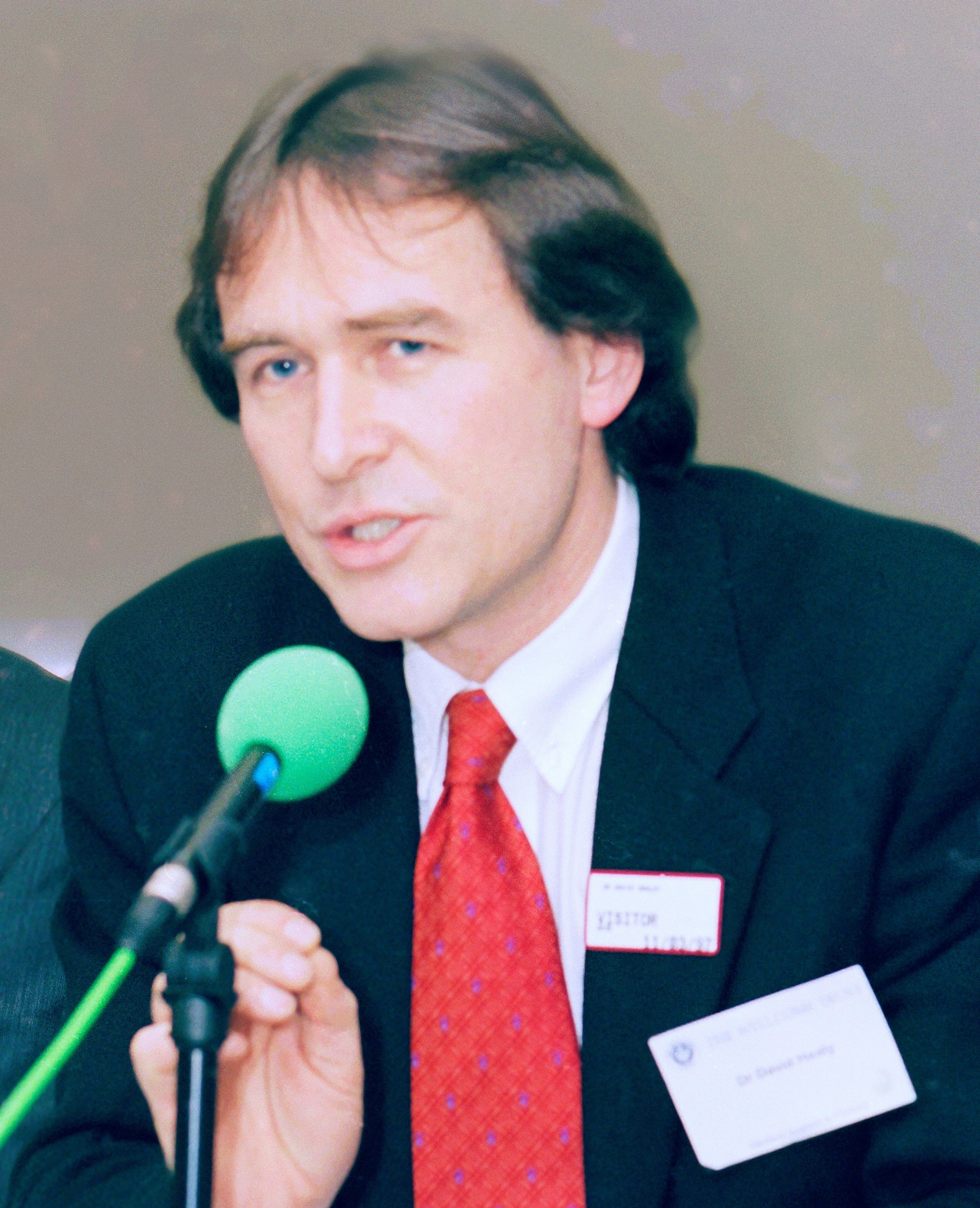
- Healy in 1997
- Born: 27 April 1954 (age 72); Raheny, Ireland
- Scientific career
- Fields: Psychiatry
- Institutions: Bangor University

David Healy FRCPsych, a professor of psychiatry at Bangor University in the United Kingdom, is a psychiatrist, psychopharmacologist, scientist and author. His main areas of research are the contribution of antidepressants to suicide, conflict of interest between pharmaceutical companies and academic medicine, and the history of pharmacology. Healy has written more than 150 peer-reviewed articles, 200 other articles, and 20 books, including The Antidepressant Era, The Creation of Psychopharmacology, The Psychopharmacologists Volumes 1–3, Let Them Eat Prozac and Mania: A Short History of Bipolar Disorder.

Healy has been involved as an expert witness in homicide and suicide trials involving psychotropic drugs, and has brought concerns about some medications to the attention of drug regulators. He has also said that pharmaceutical companies sell drugs by marketing diseases and co-opting academic opinion-leaders. In his 2012 book Pharmageddon he argues that pharmaceutical companies have dominated healthcare in America, often with life-threatening results for patients. Healy is a founder and chief executive officer of Data Based Medicine Limited, which aims to make medicines safer through "online direct patient reporting of drug effects".

== Career ==
David Healy originally trained in Dublin, Ireland, and at Cambridge University. He is a former Secretary of the British Association for Psychopharmacology. He is currently a professor of psychiatry at Bangor University in the United Kingdom, a psychiatrist, psychopharmacologist, scientist, and author. His main areas of research are the development and history of psychopharmacology, and the impact of psychotropic drugs on our culture. Healy has written more than 150 peer-reviewed articles, 200 other articles, and 20 books, including The Antidepressant Era and The Creation of Psychopharmacology from Harvard University Press, The Psychopharmacologists Volumes 1–3 and Let Them Eat Prozac from New York University Press, and Mania: A Short History of Bipolar Disorder from Johns Hopkins University Press.

Healy has been involved as a legal expert witness in homicide and suicide trials involving psychotropic drugs, and has brought concerns about some drugs to the attention of American and British regulators. He has alleged that pharmaceutical companies sell drugs by marketing diseases and co-opting academic opinion-leaders, sometimes ghostwriting their articles. His most recent book, Pharmageddon, claims that pharmaceutical companies have dominated healthcare in America, often with life-threatening results for patients. In 2000 a lucrative job at Toronto's Centre for Addiction and Mental Health was withdrawn under unclear circumstances. Healy and his supporters have claimed that this withdrawal was due to Healy giving a speech and publishing a paper claiming that the SSRI antidepressant fluoxetine increases the risk that patients will commit suicide. Lilly was a major contributor to the Centre at the time. A settlement was reached, in which Healy received a visiting professor appointment, and a joint statement was released stating "Although Dr Healy believes that his clinical appointment was rescinded because of his November 2000 speech at the CAMH [Centre for Addiction and Mental Health], Dr Healy accepts assurances that pharmaceutical companies played no role in either CAMH's decision to rescind his clinical appointment or the University of Toronto's decision to rescind his academic appointment."

Healy directs an Electroconvulsive Therapy (ECT) clinic in Wales. He strongly defends the procedure as having an immediate visible effect in severely depressed patients for whom no other options have worked, particularly geriatric patients. He has co-written a history of ECT along with Edward Shorter and cites Max Fink as a source. Healy has clarified which chapters he wrote and that he was not personally financially supported by Fink's Scion Foundation. Another reforming psychiatrist, Peter Breggin, has strongly criticised Healy for this aspect of his work on the grounds of ethics and the longer-term data. Healy has even speculated that Insulin coma therapy may have 'worked' in the sense of generating enthusiasm in staff and in an unclear way to challenge anxiety or 'psychosis', despite a lack of, or contrary, evidence from the time. He has also been criticized for portraying psychiatrists as greedy and duped.

Healy is a founder and chief executive officer of Data Based Medicine Limited, which operates through its website RxISK.org, which aims to make medicines safer through "online direct patient reporting of drug effects". Healy sits on the Honorary International Editorial Advisory Board of the Mens Sana Monographs.

In 2020 Healy's book The Decapitation of Care - A Short History of the Rise and Fall of Healthcare was published by Samizdat Health Writers' Co-operative.

== Research interests ==
=== SSRI antidepressants and suicide ===
In an international review article, Healy (and Aldred) say that the idea that antidepressants might contribute to suicide in depressed patients was first raised in 1958. For 30 years antidepressants were primarily used in severely depressed and often hospitalised patients. The issue of suicidality on selective serotonin reuptake inhibitors (SSRIs) became one of public concern with reports in 1990 that Prozac could lead to suicidality in patients. Fourteen years later, warning labels were put on antidepressants suggesting particular difficulties "during the early phase of treatment, during treatment discontinuation, and when the dose of treatment is being changed, and that treatment related risks may be present in patients being treated for syndromes other than depression, such as anxiety or smoking cessation".

Healy has written many papers and presented many lectures on his view that all SSRI antidepressants – Prozac, Paxil and Zoloft – should show warning labels, as they could "trigger suicidal and violent behavior in some patients".

=== Conflict of interest ===
Healy says that the pharmaceutical industry has a pervasive influence on academic medicine. Most of the authors published in the Journal of the American Medical Association have received research funding from, or acted as a consultant for, a drug company. Major journals have expressed concern at the ghostwriting of and conflicting interests surrounding pharmacotherapeutic studies, especially in psychiatry.

Medical ghostwriting occurs when anonymous scribes with scientific backgrounds are paid to produce reports for publication as if written by better-known experts. Healy estimates that 50 per cent of literature on drugs is ghostwritten/abnormally written. This is an estimate by Healy offered under questioning before the UK House of Commons Health Select Committee investigation. It is based on extrapolation of a 57% figure from a published paper by Healy and Cattell reliant on hard evidence on a set of papers on Zoloft which came to light due to legal discovery, to the wider field of drug studies in top quality journals. In his thesis, Healy states that ghostwriters write on research given to them by drug companies, which want both positive results and positive research; therefore ghostwriting is biased from the beginning.

Healy allegedly encountered ghost writing involving Wyeth's SNRI Effexor. Healy attended a meeting promoting Effexor, and was offered for his approval a draft article that had been written for him. He left it intact, but made two additions. One contradicted Wyeth's claim that Effexor got patients fully well compared to patients on other SSRIs and another stated that SSRIs could make some individuals suicidal. The article had already been submitted to the Journal of Psychiatry and Neuroscience before Healy saw it again; both of his additions had been removed. In response Healy removed his name from the article.

In the preface of his book Let them Eat Prozac Healy describes the need for a "new contract between society and the pharmaceutical industry – a contract that will require access to the raw data". Healy suggests a new division that can manage the hazards that only becomes visible after products are launched. This new division would be separate from the regulatory bodies and pharmaceutical companies. In "Interface between authorship, industry and science in the domain of therapeutics" a paper of 2003 for The British Journal of Psychiatry, David Healy notes that

"The literature profiles and citation rates of industry-linked and non-industry-linked articles differ. The emerging style of authorship in industry-linked articles can deliver good-quality articles, but it raises concerns for the scientific base of therapeutics … If ghostwriting is an inevitable feature of modern scientific writing, the potential availability of the raw data would do more to ensure a correspondence between those data and a published end result than could be achieved by any other mechanism".

=== History of pharmacology ===
In his book 2012 Pharmageddon, Healy discusses the well-publicised birth defects crisis caused by thalidomide, a drug initially marketed as a sleeping pill. The 1962 disaster involved more than 10,000 children in 46 countries being born limbless and disabled. The United States Congress wanted to prevent a recurrence of such a tragedy, and sought to limit the marketing excesses of the pharmaceutical industry. So new drug development was rewarded with product rather than process patents, and new drugs were made available only through prescription. Also, new medications had to prove they worked through controlled trials before they reached the market. On the 50th anniversary of the 1962 FDA bill enacted by Congress, Pharmageddon argues that these arrangements have not been successful and have actually led to an escalating number of drug induced deaths and injuries. In the same book ("Pharmageddon" page 155), Healy states that in the United States, the country that makes the greatest use of the latest pharmaceuticals, life expectancy has been falling progressively further behind other developed countries since the mid-1970s.

== Bibliography ==
=== Books ===
- The Decapitation of Care - Samizdat Health Writer's Cooperative Inc, 2020 ISBN 978-1777056506
- The Suspended Revolution: Psychiatry and Psychotherapy Re‑examined, Faber & Faber, London 1990.
- Images of Trauma: From Hysteria to Post‑traumatic Stress Disorder. Faber & Faber, London, 1993.
- Psychotropic Drug Development; Social, Economic and Pharmacological Aspects. Chapman and Hall, London 1996.
- The Psychopharmacologists Volume 1, Chapman & Hall, London, 1996; Arnold, London, 2002
- The Psychopharmacologists Volume 2. Chapman & Hall, London, 1998; Arnold, London 1999.
- The Psychopharmacologists Volume 3. Arnold, London 2000.
- The Antidepressant Era. Harvard University Press, 1997.
- The Rise of Psychopharmacology & The Story of the CINP, Animula, Budapest, 1998.
- The Triumph of Psychopharmacology & The CINP, Animula, Budapest, 2000.
- From Psychopharmacology to Neuropsychopharmacology & The Story of the CINP, Animula, Budapest, 2002.
- Reflections on Twentieth Century Psychopharmacology, Animula, Budapest, 2004.
- The Creation of Psychopharmacology (Paperback 2004) ISBN 978-0-674-01599-9
- Let Them Eat Prozac: The Unhealthy Relationship Between the Pharmaceutical Industry and Depression New York University Press (2004) ISBN 978-0-8147-3697-5
- Shock Therapy: A History of Electroconvulsive Treatment in Mental Illness. Rutgers University Press/ University of Toronto Press 2007.
- Mania: A Short History of Bipolar Disorder Johns Hopkins University Press (Paperback 2010) ISBN 978-1-4214-0397-7
- Psychiatric Drugs Explained Churchill Livingston (Paperback 5th ed. 2011) ISBN 978-0-7020-4136-5
- Pharmageddon University of California Press (2012) ISBN 978-0-520-27098-5

=== Selected articles ===
SSRI Antidepressants and suicide

- Healy D (2000). "Emergence of antidepressant induced suicidality". Primary Care Psychiatry. 6 (1): 23–28. doi:10.1185/135525700543163.
- Boardman A, Healy D (2001). "Modeling suicide risk in affective disorders". European Psychiatry. 16 (7): 400–405. doi:10.1016/s0924-9338(01)00597-1. PMID 11728852. S2CID 40073522.
- Healy D (2003). "Lines of Evidence on SSRIs and Risk of Suicide". Psychotherapy and Psychosomatics. 72 (2): 71–79. doi:10.1159/000068691. PMID 12601224. S2CID 1583644.
- Healy D, Cattell D (2003). "The Interface between authorship, industry and science in the domain of therapeutics". British Journal of Psychiatry. 183: 22–27. doi:10.1192/bjp.183.1.22. PMID 12835239.
- Healy D, Whitaker CJ (2003). "Antidepressants and suicide; Risk-Benefit Conundrums". Journal of Psychiatry & Neuroscience. 28 (5): 331–339. PMC 193979. PMID 14517576., with response by Y Lapierre 340–349.
- Fergusson D, Doucette S, Cranley-Glass K (2005). "The association between suicide attempts and SSRIs: A systematic review of 677 randomised controlled trials representing 85,470 participants". British Medical Journal. 330 (7488): 396–399. doi:10.1136/bmj.330.7488.396. PMC 549110. PMID 15718539.
- Healy D, Aldred G (2005). "Antidepressant drug use and the risk of suicide". International Review of Psychiatry. 17 (3): 163–172. doi:10.1080/09540260500071624. PMID 16194787. S2CID 6599566.
- Healy D, Herxheimer A, Menkes D (2006). "Antidepressants and violence: Problems at the interface of medicine and law". PLOS Medicine. 3 (9) e372. doi:10.1371/journal.pmed.0030372. PMC 1564177. PMID 16968128.
- Healy D, Harris M, Tranter R, Gutting P, Austin R, Jones-Edwards G, Roberts AP (2006). "Lifetime suicide rates in treated schizophrenia: 1875–1924 and 1994–1998 cohorts compared". British Journal of Psychiatry. 188 (3): 223–228. doi:10.1192/bjp.188.3.223. PMID 16507962. With Commentary by T Turner, 229–230.
- Reseland S, Le Noury J, Aldred G, Healy D (2008). "National suicide rates 1961–2003: further analysis of Nordic data for suicide, autopsies and ill-defined death rates". Psychotherapy and Psychosomatics. 77 (2): 78–82. doi:10.1159/000112884. PMID 18230940. S2CID 23306023.
- Healy D, Brent D (2009). "Are Selective Serotonin Reuptake Inhibitors a risk factor for adolescent suicides?". Canadian Journal of Psychiatry. 54 (2): 69–71. doi:10.1177/070674370905400201. PMID 19254434.
- Healy D (2011). "Science, rhetoric and the causality of adverse events". International Journal of Risk & Safety in Medicine. 23 (3): 149–162. doi:10.3233/JRS-2011-0534. PMID 22020395.

Conflict of interest

- Healy D (2004). "Conflicting Interests: The evolution of an issue". Monash Review of Bioethics. 23 (4): 8–18. doi:10.1007/bf03351417. PMID 15688509. S2CID 23624502.
- Healy D (2004). Perspective. Manufacturing Consensus. Hasting Center Reports July–August, 53.
- Healy D (2006). "Manufacturing Consensus. Culture". Medicine and Psychiatry. 30 (2): 135–156. CiteSeerX 10.1.1.603.2883. doi:10.1007/s11013-006-9013-3. PMID 16804639. S2CID 7439017.
- Healy D (2006). "The Latest Mania. Selling Bipolar Disorder". PLOS Medicine. 3 (4) e185. doi:10.1371/journal.pmed.0030185. PMC 1434505. PMID 16597178.
- Healy D (2007). "The New Engineers of Human Souls and Academia". Epidemiologia e Psichiatria Sociale. 16: 205–211. doi:10.1017/S1121189X0000230X. S2CID 31092695.
- Healy D, Le Noury J (2007). "Paediatric Bipolar Disorder. An object of study in the creation of an illness". Int J Risk & Safety in Medicine. 19 (4): 209–221. doi:10.3233/JRS-2007-419.
- Healy D (2008). "Our Censored Journals". Mens Sana Monographs. 6 (1): 244–256. doi:10.4103/0973-1229.39302 (inactive 11 July 2025). PMC 3190554. PMID 22013362.
- Healy D (2008). "Irrational Healers?". Psychotherapy and Psychosomatics. 77 (4): 198–200. doi:10.1159/000126070. PMID 18418025. S2CID 37648518.
- Healy D (2009). "Trussed in Evidence: Ambiguities at the interface of clinical practice and clinical evidence". Transcultural Psychiatry. 46 (1): 16–37. doi:10.1177/1363461509102285. PMID 19293278. S2CID 27722175.
- Healy D, Mangin D, Mintzes B (2010). "The ethics of randomised placebo controlled trials of antidepressants with pregnant women". Internat Journal of Risk and Safety in Medicine. 22: 7–16. doi:10.3233/JRS-2010-0487.
- Healy D (2012). "Medical Partizans? Why doctors need conflicting interests". Australian & New Zealand Journal of Psychiatry. 46 (8): 704–707. doi:10.1177/0004867412454197. PMID 22848058. S2CID 206398405.

History of pharmacology

- Healy D, Harris M, Tranter R, Gutting P, Austin R, Jones-Edwards G, Roberts AP (2006). "Lifetime suicide rates in treated schizophrenia: 1875–1924 and 1994–1998 cohorts compared". British Journal of Psychiatry. 188 (3): 223–228. doi:10.1192/bjp.188.3.223. PMID 16507962. With Commentary by T Turner, 229–230.
- Tschinkel S, Harris M, Le Noury J, Healy D (2007). "Postpartum Psychosis: Two Cohorts Compared, 1875–1924 & 1994–2005". Psychological Medicine. 37 (4): 529–536. doi:10.1017/s0033291706009202. PMID 17076918. S2CID 1820395.
- Farquhar F, Le Noury J, Tschinkel S, Harris M, Kurien R, Healy D (2007). "The incidence and prevalence of manic-melancholic syndromes in North West Wales: 1875–2005". Acta Psychiatrica Scandinavica. 115 (433): 37–43. doi:10.1111/j.1600-0447.2007.00961.x. PMID 17280569. S2CID 24032889.
- Linden S, Harris M, Whitaker C, Healy D (2010). "Religion and psychosis. The effects of the Welsh Religious Revival 1904–1905". Psychological Medicine. 40 (8): 1317–1324. doi:10.1017/s0033291709991917. PMID 19917147. S2CID 33563939.
- Harris M, Farquhar F, Healy D, Le Noury J, Baker D, Whitaker CJ, Linden S, Green P, Roberts AP (2011). "The incidence and prevalence of admissions for Melancholia in two cohorts 1875–1924 & 1995–2005". Journal of Affective Disorders. 134 (1–3): 45–51. doi:10.1016/j.jad.2011.06.015. PMID 21733576.
- Healy D, Le Noury J, Linden SC, Harris M, Whitaker C, Linden D, Roberts AP (2012). "The Rise and Fall in the Incidence of Admissions for Schizophrenia: 1875–1924 & 1994–2010". BMJ Open. 2 (1) e000447. doi:10.1136/bmjopen-2011-000447. PMC 3263437. PMID 22267688.
- Healy D, Le Noury J, Harris M, Butt M, Linden S, Whitaker C, Zou L, Roberts AP (2012). "Mortality in schizophrenia and related psychoses: data from two cohorts, 1875–1924 & 1994–2010". BMJ Open. 2 (5) e001810. doi:10.1136/bmjopen-2012-001810. PMC 3488735. PMID 23048063.

Medication-induced sexual dysfunction

- Healy D, Noury LJ, Manginb D (May 2018). "Enduring sexual dysfunction after treatment with antidepressants, 5α-reductase inhibitors and isotretinoin: 300 cases". International Journal of Risk & Safety in Medicine. 29 (3): 125–134. doi:10.3233/JRS-180744. PMC 6004900. PMID 29733030.

== See also ==
- Bad Pharma – book
- Ben Goldacre
- Deadly Medicines and Organised Crime – book
- Irving Kirsch
- John Ioannidis
- Nancy Olivieri
- Peter C. Gøtzsche
