= Goldacre =

Goldacre is a surname. Notable people with the surname include:

- Ben Goldacre (born 1974), British physician, academic, and science writer
- Michael Goldacre (born 1944), medical doctor and academic, father of Ben
