= Carl Heneghan =

British physician

- Born: 23 January 1968 (age 58); UK
- Known for: epidemiology
- Scientific career
- Fields: Medicine, epidemiology
- Workplaces: University of Oxford, Kellogg College; Centre for Evidence-Based Medicine

Carl James Heneghan (born January 1968) is a British general practitioner physician, a clinical epidemiologist and a Fellow of Kellogg College. He is the director of the University of Oxford's Centre for Evidence-Based Medicine and former Editor-in-Chief of BMJ Evidence-Based Medicine.

Heneghan is a Professor of Evidence-based medicine at the University of Oxford, NHS Urgent Care General Practitioner, and co-director of the Global Centre for Healthcare and Urbanisation. Heneghan's work includes investigating the evidence for approval of drugs and devices, assessing health claims, and researching common presenting conditions in the community. He has expertise in medical device regulations, diagnosis, screening and avoidable harms: including analyses of antiviral medication Tamiflu, acute respiratory infections and the transmission of SARs-CoV-2.

Professor Heneghan is the Director of Programs in Evidence-Based Health Care at the University of Oxford, running since 2000 as the largest part time program in the Medical Sciences Division. Heneghan writes regularly in the media, including at the Spectator and, along with Tom Jefferson, created the substack Trust the Evidence.

== Career and research ==
=== Research ===
Heneghan is one of the founders of AllTrials, an international initiative which calls for all studies to be published, and their results reported. He is a member of the Scientific Advisory Board of Collateral Global, an organisation that examines the global impact of the COVID-19 restrictions. He has also been a clinical advisor to three UK All Parliamentary Party Groups, including on the use of surgical mesh, and has advised the World Health Organisation's clinical trials registry platform.

=== Honours and awards ===
In 2013, Heneghan was voted on to the Health Service Journal's list of top 100 most influential clinical leaders in England. He was awarded NIHR Senior Investigation status in 2018. Heneghan received a lifetime achievement award in 2019 from Oxford's Medical Science Division, for his sustained commitment to education and teaching.

=== COVID-19 pandemic ===
On 21 September 2020, Heneghan alongside Sunetra Gupta, Karol Sikora and 28 signatories wrote an open letter to the UK prime minister, chancellor and chief medical officers asking for a rethink of the government's COVID-19 strategy. They argued in favour of a targeted approach to lockdowns advising that only over-65s and the vulnerable should be shielded.

During the pandemic, Heneghan has written for The Spectator magazine. In it, he has commentated on various aspects of the UK's governments response to the COVID-19 pandemic. On 19 November 2020, he wrote an article with Tom Jefferson, an epidemiologist, in which he criticised the science behind wearing face masks to reduce transmissions of COVID-19. In the article he stated that; "Now we have properly rigorous scientific research that we can rely on, the evidence shows that wearing masks in the community does not significantly reduce the rates of infection." His claim was met with criticism. Sonia Sodha of The Guardian argued that Heneghan had made scientific errors because he had misrepresented a Danish randomized controlled trial which studied infection transmission rates on people who wore face masks. This was because the Danish mask study was only focused on infection transmissions for those wearing masks, rather than on the overall community, so could not be used to make judgements on the effects of face masks on community wide transmission rates.

Kamran Abbasi, executive editor of the British Medical Journal (BMJ), also criticised Heneghan's claims about face masks because he believed his interpretation of the Danish study was inaccurate. However, Abbasi stressed that he believed it was wrong that Heneghan's opinion be marked as "false information" on Facebook because, as he wrote in the BMJ, "disagreement among experts, especially about interpretation of a study, is a common occurrence. It is the usual business of science."

== Publications ==
- Evidence-Based Medicine Toolkit - EBMT-EBM Toolkit Series, Carl Heneghan, Douglas Badenoch. BMJ Publishing Group, 2006.
- Statistics Toolkit - EBMT-EBM Toolkit Series, Rafael Perera, Carl Heneghan, Douglas Badenoch. John Wiley and Sons Ltd, 2011.
