= Tracey Brown (scientist) =

British scientist

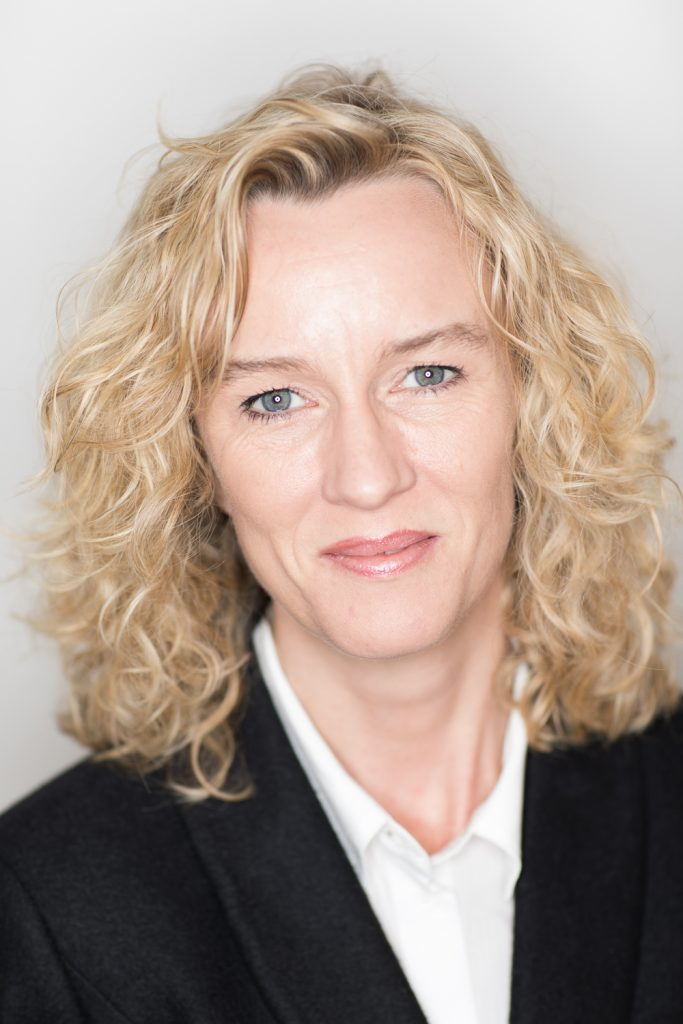
Tracey Brown

Tracey Brown is the director of Sense about Science. She leads the work on transparency of evidence used by governments in policy to ensure the public has the same access to evidence and reasoning as the decision makers. Brown has launched multiple initiatives with Sense about Science to expand and protect honest discussions of evidence, including AllTrials, a global campaign for the reporting of all clinical trial outcomes; and the Ask for Evidence campaign, which engages the public in requesting evidence for claims.

== Career ==
When it was launched in 2002, she became director of Sense about Science. Under her leadership, the organisation has created a public awareness for sound science and evidence, prompting accountability. In 2010, she drafted the Principles for the Treatment of Independent Scientific Advice which was finalised and accepted into the Ministerial Code by the UK government later that year. In 2013, Brown created the public interest defence to libel in the Defamation Act 2013 and the Evidence Transparency Framework, used to audit UK government in 2016 and 2017. In 2015 she gave a TEDTalk on The Power of Asking for Evidence and the following year was a judge for the John Maddox Prize for Standing up for Science.

She is a trustee at the Jill Dando Institute of Security and Crime Science as well as the Chair of Trustees at the Jurassica Project which, in 2017, merged with another endeavour to create The Journey. She is also an advisory board member of OpenTrials and was named a friend of the Royal College of Pathologists in 2009.

== Views ==
Brown is a vocal critic of the idea of a "post truth" society, advocating that the public still has great interest in sound and trustworthy evidence.

== Writing ==
She has written for The Guardian, as well as periodical publications and public guides, writing and editing the 2009 peer review survey. She has written two books co-authored by the late science journalist, Michael Hanlon titled Playing by the Rules: How Our Obsession with Safety Is Putting Us All at Risk and In the Interests of Safety.

== Awards and recognition ==
In 2010, Brown was named one of the top ten most influential people in science policy and, in 2014, one of the top ten policy making scientists by the UK Science Council.

Brown received an OBE in 2017 for her services to science and, in 2020, was made an honorary professor by University College London.
