= Peter C. Gøtzsche =

Danish physician and medical researcher (born 1949)

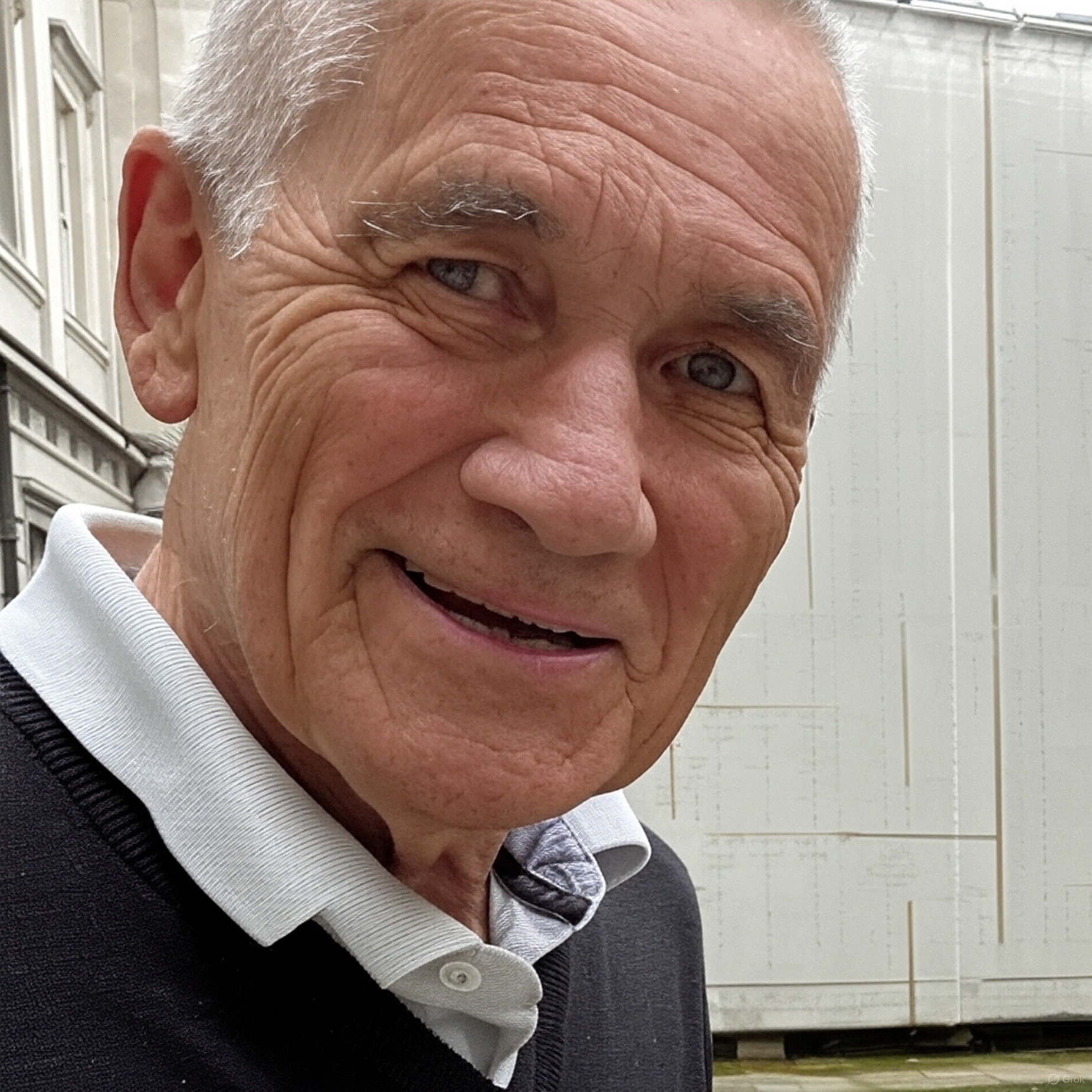
Peter Gotzsche at the Critical Psychiatry Network Symposium at UCL (11 April 2024, London)

Peter Christian Gøtzsche (born 26 November 1949) is a Danish physician, medical researcher, and former leader of the Nordic Cochrane Center at Rigshospitalet in Copenhagen, Denmark. He is a co-founder of the Cochrane Collaboration and has written numerous reviews for the organization. His membership in Cochrane was terminated by its Governing Board of Trustees on 25 September 2018. The British Medical Journal (BMJ) extensively covered Peter Gøtzsche's expulsion from the Cochrane Collaboration, framing it as a major crisis involving governance, transparency, and conflicts of interest.

During the COVID-19 pandemic, vocal vaccine advocate David Gorski, surgical oncologist and Professor of Surgery and Oncology, and critic of the anti-vaccine movement published on Science-Based Medicine (SBM) on March 21, 2023 the article, where he critiques a preprint systematic review "Serious Harms of the Covid-19 Vaccine" by Peter Gøtzsche and Maryanne Demasi.

== Biography ==
After completing high school, Gøtzsche studied science graduating with a Master of Science in biology and chemistry in 1974. He worked briefly as a teacher. In 1975 he took a job in the pharmaceutical industry as a drug representative for Astra AB; several months later he became a product manager. In 1977 Gøtzsche took a position at Astra-Syntex and was responsible for clinical trials. While at Astra-Syntex he started to study medicine and graduated as a physician in 1984.

Gøtzsche worked at hospitals in Copenhagen from 1984 to 1995. He co-founded with Sir Iain Chalmers and about 80 other investigators the Cochrane Collaboration in 1993. The same year he established the Nordic Cochrane Centre. In 2010, Gøtzsche was named Professor of Clinical Research Design and Analysis at the University of Copenhagen. This professorship was later retracted from the university. In 2017, he was elected a member of the Governing Board of Cochrane. In September 2018 he was expelled from Cochrane Collaboration. In 2019 Gøtzsche founded the Institute for Scientific Freedom, whose goal is "to preserve honesty and integrity in science".

== Research and reviews ==
Among his research findings are that placebo has surprisingly little effect and that many meta-analyses may have data extraction errors. Gøtzsche and his coauthors have at times criticized the research methods and interpretations of other scientists, e.g. in meta-analysis of placebo.

Gøtzsche has commented on meta-analysis, and the editorial independence of medical journals. He has written about issues surrounding medical ghostwriting with the position that it is scientific misconduct. He has also criticized the widespread use of SSRI antidepressants.

=== Critique of mammography screening ===
Gøtzsche has been critical of screening for breast cancer using mammography, arguing that it cannot be justified; his critique has caused controversy. His critique stems from a meta-analysis he did on mammography screening studies and published as Is screening for breast cancer with mammography justifiable? in The Lancet in 2000. In it he discarded six out of eight studies, arguing their randomization was inadequate.

In 2006 a paper by Gøtzsche on mammography screening was electronically published in the European Journal of Cancer ahead of print. The journal later removed the paper completely from the journal website without any formal retraction. The paper was later published in Danish Medical Bulletin with a short note from the editor, and Gøtzsche and his coauthors commented on the unilateral retraction that the authors were not involved in.

In 2012 his book Mammography Screening: Truth, Lies and Controversy was published. In 2013 his book Deadly Medicines and Organised Crime: How Big Pharma Has Corrupted Healthcare was published.

=== Critique of reviews of HPV vaccine ===
At the behest of the Danish Health and Medicines Authorities the European Medicines Agency (EMA) was charged to review data in women concerning use of HPV vaccines and the possible development of rare side effects, namely complex regional pain syndrome (CRPS) and postural orthostatic tachycardia syndrome (POTS). EMA's review was issued in November 2015 and found no causal relationship. Louise Brinth, a Danish physician who had published observational studies on POTS, subsequently critiqued the EMA review in a detailed rebuttal. Gøtzsche supported her and issued a formal complaint to the EMA criticizing their report in May 2018.

Gøtzsche et al. also found faults with a 2018 Cochrane review of the HPV vaccine. The review had judged the vaccine as effective and did not find an increased risk of serious adverse effects.

=== Systematic Criticism of Psychiatric Drugs ===
In his 2015 book Deadly Psychiatry and Organised Denial, Peter Gøtzsche claims that psychotropic drugs are minimally effective but highly dangerous, stating that 98% of users with mental disorders could discontinue them. He believes only a few need short-term antipsychotics or benzodiazepines during acute episodes, with gradual tapering to avoid withdrawal. Gøtzsche says national authorities should revise psychiatric guidelines and open discontinuation clinics.

==== Flaws in Trials and Concealed Risks ====
Gøtzsche reports that trials overestimate benefits due to withdrawal in placebo groups from prior drugs, increasing complications like suicides in antipsychotic studies. He claims industry-funded trials hide deaths; his FDA analysis reports antidepressant suicides 15 times higher than reported (14 vs. 5, excluding post-discontinuation cases).

==== Increased Mortality ====
Gøtzsche states antipsychotics raise dementia mortality by 1% (one death per 100 treated); he reports benzodiazepines double risk in over-55s (one death per 100/year). He claims antidepressants add 2%. Using Danish data, he reports 3,693 annual deaths in Denmark; he stated in 2015 at least 539,000 deaths in US/EU.

==== Dubious Efficacy ====
Gøtzsche claims double-blind trials fail due to unblinding; he reports a Cochrane review with active placebo (atropine) showed no tricyclic antidepressant advantage. He states fluoxetine/venlafaxine effects lag placebo by days, likely natural remission. Gøtzsche reports antipsychotics improve PANSS by 6 (below clinical minimum of 15). He claims stimulants for ADHD offer doubtful benefits outweighed by harms, including animal-proven brain damage.

== Expulsion from Cochrane ==
Gøtzsche had been elected to the Governing Board in 2017. On 13 September 2018, Cochrane's Governing Board at the annual meeting in Edinburgh, Scotland voted by a majority of one - 6 to 5 vote of the 13-member board - to expel Gøtzsche from the board, citing "seriously bad behaviour" and "disrepute" for his outspoken criticisms of pharmaceutical industry influence, breast cancer screening, and psychiatric drugs. This triggered resignations from four supporting board members, described as a "mass exodus" and "sinking ship" for the organization. BMJ highlighted the flawed process, including Gøtzsche's exclusion from the vote and a rushed "show trial" based on an external law firm's report.

In a BMJ blog, Gøtzsche called the expulsion undemocratic and a betrayal of Cochrane's founding principles of academic freedom and independence, accusing leadership of centralisation and suppressing dissent. He proudly claimed his "bad behaviour" was merely questioning bad science and industry ties.

On 27 September 2018, the board upheld the dismissal after an appeal, stripping Gøtzsche of all roles, including director of the Nordic Cochrane Centre—his first exclusion in 25 years as a founding member.

BMJ reported international backlash, including a call from Cochrane Iberoamerica (Spain-based) for an independent investigation into the "non-transparent" handling.

Gerd Antes of Cochrane Deutschland interpreted the situation as a "governance crisis" and called for "the strict orientation on the objectives and fundamental principles of Cochrane" naming "(s)cientific rigour, knowledge with minimal bias, maximum trust and consistent safeguarding against interest-driven influence on the evidence" as primary.

Rapid responses criticised conflicts of interest in Cochrane reviews (e.g., author ties to drug companies) and urged an overhaul to restore trust.

Overall, BMJ portrayed the event as symptomatic of Cochrane's internal struggles with corporatisation and stifled debate, emphasising Gøtzsche's role as a whistleblower.

== Books ==
- Peter C. Gøtzsche; Henrik R. Wulff (2007). Rational Diagnosis and Treatment: Evidence-based Clinical Decision-making (4th ed.). John Wiley & Sons. ISBN 978-0-470-72368-5.
- Peter C. Gøtzsche (2012). Mammography Screening: Truth, Lies and Controversy. Radcliffe Publishing. ISBN 978-1-84619-585-3.
- Peter C. Gøtzsche (2013). Deadly Medicines and Organised Crime: How Big Pharma Has Corrupted Healthcare. Taylor & Francis. ISBN 978-1-84619-884-7.
- Peter C. Gøtzsche (2015). Deadly Psychiatry and Organised Denial. People's Press. ISBN 978-87-7159-623-6.
- Peter C. Gøtzsche (2019). Death of a whistleblower and Cochrane's moral collapse. People's Press. ASIN B07N927GXC.
- Peter C. Gøtzsche (2019). Survival in an Overmedicated World: Look Up the Evidence Yourself. People's Press. ASIN B07R5TPV9C.
- Peter C. Gøtzsche (2020). Vaccines: Truth, Lies and Controversy. People's Press. ASIN B0848FPKNP.
- Peter C. Gøtzsche (2020). Mental Health Survival Kit and Withdrawal from Psychiatric Drugs. People's Press. ASIN B08HM7QGFZ.

== Reports ==
- Peter C. Gøtzsche (14 Dec 2012). Corporate crime in the pharmaceutical industry is common, serious and repetitive (PDF) (Report). Nordic Cochrane Centre. Archived from the original (PDF) on 24 January 2013.
  - Short version of the above: Gotzsche, P. C. (2012). "Big pharma often commits corporate crime, and this must be stopped". BMJ. 345 (dec14 3) e8462. doi:10.1136/bmj.e8462. PMID 23241451. S2CID 29898648.

== See also ==
- Bad Pharma – book
- Ben Goldacre
- David Healy (psychiatrist)
- Irving Kirsch
- John Ioannidis
- Nancy Olivieri
