= Direct-to-consumer advertising =

Promotion of medical products directly to consumers

Direct-to-consumer advertising (DTCA) refers to the marketing and advertising of pharmaceutical products directly to consumers as patients, as opposed to specifically targeting health professionals. The term is synonymous primarily with the advertising of prescription medicines via mass media platforms—most commonly on television and in magazines, but also via online platforms.

Direct-to-consumer advertising is only completely legal in New Zealand and the United States, but are subject to regulations regarding the balanced disclosure of a prescription's benefits in comparison to its risks (including but not limited to side effects and contraindications), among other factors. Regulations regarding DTCA are typically applied to advertising materials that describe a prescription's indications and benefits, and may be more lenient to advertising materials which do not discuss uses. Many countries ban any advertising of prescription drugs directly to consumers.

There are ethical and regulatory concerns regarding DTCA, specifically the extent to which these ads may unduly influence the prescribing of the prescriptions based on consumer demands when, in some cases, they may not be medically necessary, or there are cheaper options available. Critics of DTCA have argued that too much is spent on marketing medications, rather than into research and development; in the United States, ad spending by drugmakers reached US$5.2 billion in 2016.

As outlined by Science Daily in 2009, the impact of DTC media on technology-assisted health behaviors is demonstrated by the increasing number of consumers making critical medical decisions informed primarily by online health information.

== Types ==
The U.S. Food and Drug Administration (FDA) defines several common types of DTCA for prescription medication:

- A "product claim" advertisement identifies the nonproprietary and trade names of the medication, and contains at least one approved indication, and claims surrounding its benefits. They contain a call to action urging viewers to ask their doctor or seek an external resource (such as a website or phone hotline) for more information.
- A "reminder" advertisement is designed to build brand recognition for a medication. Reminder ads do contain a call to action, but exclude any information or imagery that pertain to the medication's approved use. They may have themes that vaguely allude to the drug's purpose, such as a commercial for the erectile dysfunction medication Viagra that featured scenes of a man happily walking to work to the showtune "Good Morning", emphasizing an innuendo in the lyric "it's great to stay up late".
- A "help-seeking" advertisement is presented as an awareness campaign for a particular medical condition. They do not specify any specific product or treatment themselves, but their call to action direct the viewer to resources that promote a specific prescription option for the condition. Help-seeking campaigns are sometimes used as preliminary marketing for new drugs.

Reminder and help-seeking ads are often used by drugmakers to bypass the more onerous restrictions (such as the required listing of side effects), or outright prohibitions on product claims advertising, as neither of them are focused on promoting the drug itself. Sometimes, a campaign may mix both of these ads, with one ad discussing the condition, and another, similarly-styled ad, mentioning the product but not the condition, seeking to have the viewer infer the association between the ads.

== Support ==
Supporters of direct-to-consumer advertising argue that advertisements increase competition which leads to lower prescription drug prices and new development, citing, for instance, that between 1997 and 2001, spending on research and development in the U.S. increased 59% while spending on promoting drugs directly to patients increased 145%. However, other experts have asserted that funding for R&D is determined by several other factors. Direct-to-consumer advertising, among other patient education initiatives, can educate consumers and patients about new treatments and therapeutic options that may not have been proactively mentioned by their healthcare professional. Proponents of DTCA claim this provides a vital opportunity for the public to be aware of what is available to them and to engage in an educated discussion with their doctor. A study observed that direct-to-consumer advertising promotes communication between patients and their doctors about medications. Thirty percent of Americans indicated they talk with their doctor about a medicine they saw on TV. In addition, surveys showed that increased advertising has had a positive impact on the degree to which people adhere to a given course of treatment – but only among those who were already on medication prior to exposure to direct-to-consumer advertising. Among this population, a 10% increase in exposure to drug advertising increases the rate of adherence between 1% and 2%.

== Market impact ==
It has been argued that direct-to-consumer advertising can influence the doctor–patient relationship, including patients bringing up their need for an advertised, name-brand drug as their primary concern during a doctor visit, and becoming interested in newly-introduced medications that may not have undergone sufficient postmarketing surveillance. It has been demonstrated that direct-to-consumer ads have contributed to the frequency of requests made by patients towards their physicians to prescribe analgesic drugs, including opioids. A patient's request for a specific medication dramatically increases the rate at which physicians prescribe usually more expensive, branded drugs even when treatment for existing indications does not warrant such use. Pharmaceutical companies have also faced allegations of "disease mongering"—the process of promoting awareness of minor conditions such as balding and skin wrinkles in such a way that it encourages the sale of treatments for them.

== Drug safety ==
Advertisements generally begin within a year of drugs entering the market, before postmarketing surveillance is available to see if adverse effects emerge, which increases the risk of harm. In the early 2000s, the FDA's resources to screen DTC ads were not keeping pace with the number of ads being produced, raising the risk that the inappropriate ads were not removed. Vioxx was heavily marketed and was widely-prescribed after its approval in 1999. When the drug was withdrawn for safety reasons in 2004, Merck, its developer, and the FDA were criticized for the campaign.

Direct-to-consumer advertising of pharmaceuticals had long been suspected of downplaying the risk to consumers. Studies by Scientific American reliably found that consumers perceived the side effects of drugs to be less severe when they were presented with ads that listed both "major" and "minor" side effects, and more severe when only major side effects are listed.

Several DTC ads have faced criticism or FDA warnings over containing depictions of activities that are part of a prescription's contraindications, such as an advertisement for the blood thinner Xarelto which featured scenes of a patient spokesperson among motorcycles (despite a disclaimer stating that the spokes-patient had to stop riding her motorcycle while taking the medication), and a print ad for the Factor IX treatment Idelvion containing an image of a soccer player (with the FDA warning that soccer was a "moderate to dangerous high-risk activity for hemophilic patients", and that the ad falsely implied patients could engage in such activity without consequences).

== Criticism ==
Some studies have asserted that direct-to-consumer advertising misleads patients into demanding heavily-advertised drugs, leading to superfluous or sub-optimal treatment. Doctors may feel pressured to prescribe specific brand-name medications because they were mentioned by a patient. In 2016, the Centers for Disease Control and Prevention reported that 47% of all antibiotics prescribed in the United States were unnecessary. Another study of young people living in West Palm Beach, Florida found that a 10% increase in advertising expose increased the total number of prescriptions by 5%; a higher percentage change than in Denver, Colorado – where DTCA expenditures per person are lower.

Critics also argue that resources spent on advertising could otherwise be spent on research and development for new drugs and medical therapies. Danish physician Peter C. Gøtzsche indicated that pharmaceutical companies will advertise for their most profitable products, many of which are unnecessary "me-too" drugs. He maintains that "there is no need for marketing, as the products should speak for themselves."

Some drug ads have "gendered" diseases in ways that do not reflect actual epidemiology. Women's bodies have also been objectified to mask or distract from unpleasant aspects of diseases. The marketing of drugs for inflammatory bowel disease have been called out on both counts. Similarly, the marketing of Gardasil was primarily aimed at young women, when sexually transmitted diseases are carried by, and affect, both genders.

== By region ==
=== Brazil ===
In 2008 a new resolution from ANVISA (Control Agency for Sanitary Vigilance), Resolution 96 from December 17 was released, with focus on medication advertisements. It allows direct-to-consumer advertising of non-prescription medication, with restrictions on the type of drug and words and images that can be used, among other things. Advertisements for prescription medications can only appear in scientific, medical, or health professional journals.

=== Canada ===
The Food and Drugs Act prohibits most direct-to-consumer advertising of prescription medications: all direct-to-consumer advertising of drugs was forbidden until 1978, when Health Canada began to allow ads containing names, quantities, and prices only, so that pharmacies could display their prices for comparison purposes. In 2000, Health Canada adopted an interpretation of this law allowing for the aforementioned "reminder" and "help-seeking" advertisements, although U.S.-style "full product ads" that mention the purpose of a prescription remain prohibited. Later that year, Health Canada ruled that a pairing of similarly-themed reminder and help-seeking commercials ran afoul of the regulations, as their combination constituted a full product ad.

There are no regulations requiring direct-to-consumer advertising to be removed or substituted from U.S. television channels and publications when they are being distributed in Canada.

In 2014, York University professor and physician Dr. Joel Lexchin, and University of British Columbia associate professor Barbara Mintzes, published a study that highlighted 10 DTC cases between 2000 and 2011 with "unsatisfactory" responses from Health Canada. They found that Health Canada's application of these regulations "[lacked] accountability and transparency"—with no public record of complaints and enforcement besides media coverage of certain prominent cases, and no evidence that Health Canada has ever issued fines for violations. In conclusion, they stated that "since DTCA became prominent in the U.S. in the mid-1990s, successive governments of different political stripes in Canada have shown a remarkably consistent commitment to non-enforcement".

=== Europe ===
In October 2002, the European Commission voted against a proposal to selectively allow advertising of "disease education information" in relation to AIDS, asthma, and diabetes. Despite insistence otherwise due to its selective and controlled nature, the European Parliament Committee on the Environment, Public Health and Food Safety assessed that the pharmaceutical industry could not be trusted to provide impartial and unbiased information. UK Labour Party MEP Catherine Stihler argued that the proposal was a "slippery slope" towards U.S.-style advertising practices promoting expensive "wonder drugs", and that "we don't want consumers sitting on their couches bombarded with a hard sell from big drug companies in the advertising break between Crossroads and Coronation Street."

=== Hong Kong ===
Under the Undesirable Medical Advertisements Ordinance, advertising of medications is only legal for "minor" diseases, such as coughs and colds, headaches, indigestion, and others. Ads may not include depictions of treatment, medical professionals, or dramatizations of symptoms.

=== New Zealand ===
Under the Medicines Act of 1981, and regulated by the Therapeutic Products Advertising Code and a self-regulatory code by the industry group Medicines New Zealand, New Zealand is one of the only countries beside the United States to allow direct-to-consumer advertising of prescription medications.

A review of the Medicines Act to develop a replacement—the Therapeutic Products Bill—faced lobbying efforts for and against the continued legality of DTCA. The practice was to remain legal under the proposed bill, with oversight of product claims moved from New Zealand's consumer protection laws to a new Therapeutic Product Regulator under the Ministry of Health. The bill was passed in July 2023 and expected to take effect in September 2026. However, the bill was repealed by the right-wing coalition government that took power in November 2023.

=== United Kingdom ===
Advertising materials directed towards the general public are prohibited from containing any references to prescription-only medications, under the basis that they are not to be presented as a consumer's choice. The home page of a drug manufacturer's website also constitutes advertising material, and thus may not include references to prescription products either.Consumer-facing online healthcare services have also raised regulatory questions where remote consultations, prescribing, and pharmacy fulfilment are combined.

In a 2005 Health Select Committee hearing, GlaxoSmithKline UK general manager Eddie Gray stated that the company did not plan to lobby for DTC in the region, citing prevailing consumer attitudes against the concept.

=== United States ===
Under the regulations of the Food and Drug Administration (FDA), direct-to-consumer "product claim" advertisements for a prescription medication must include information on their major side effects and contraindications in the main body, with a "fair balance" in its coverage of benefits to risks. Unless they are given "adequate provision" via a variety of different outlets, ads must also include a "brief summary" of all risks associated with the medication. In print ads within magazines, this summary is typically given on a second page.

Print ads must contain a standard notice that instructs patients to report negative side effects and adverse events to the FDA's MedWatch program. In ads carried on broadcast media, such as television commercials, only the major side effects are typically listed, and the ad directs viewers to consult a website or current magazine issue for more information (the aforementioned "brief summary"). If the drug is subject to a boxed warning from the FDA (which indicates a serious risk), the warning must be reproduced in all advertising materials, and reminder ads for the drug are prohibited.

If an advertisement does not contain health claims, it does not fall under the FDA's jurisdiction, but can still be regulated by the Federal Trade Commission.

==== Early history ====
In 1962, the United States Congress gave the FDA the authority to regulate prescription drug labeling and advertising, but the FDA did not establish regulations until 1969. These required that ads for prescriptions include information on their major side effects and contraindications, and unless they have "adequate provision" via different outlets, a "brief summary" of all side effects and contraindications.

Pharmaceutical companies shifted the focus of their marketing efforts to licensed medical doctors in the 1970s, as the FDA mandated that only doctors could prescribe medicine. However, a larger movement towards autonomy in health care decisions prompted the first prominent examples of direct-to-consumer advertising. Merck published the first print DTC ad for a pneumonia vaccine targeting those aged 65 years and older, and Boots Pharmaceuticals aired the first DTC television commercial in 1983 for the prescription ibuprofen Rufen. The Rufen commercial focused on its price in comparison to the leading brand Motrin, and did not contain any product claims. The FDA briefly demanded that the Rufen ad be pulled, but it was restored after minor amendments.

As its guidelines were not written with mass media in mind, these early campaigns prompted concern from the FDA, especially after the arthritis drug Oraflex (whose release had been backed by a significant PR campaign) was recalled after only five months on the market, following reports of adverse reactions and deaths. FDA commissioner Arthur Hayes showed reservations for the impact that DTCA would have on the industry and public health, and called for a moratorium in September 1983 pending further regulations. The moratorium was lifted in 1985, with the FDA clarifying that DTCA on broadcast media was subject to the same requirements enforced for print media (including the provision of a "brief summary" of all risks associated with the medication).

==== Partial deregulation ====
The pharmaceutical industry felt that the FDA's requirements made television commercials for medications infeasible, as the aforementioned summaries had been increasing in length (usually taking up an entire separate page of fine print when published in a magazine) and used technical language. In the 1990s, the industry pushed the FDA to make its regulations less burdensome. By 1996, some drug manufacturers had begun to leverage a loophole in the regulations by airing commercials that did not contain medical claims at all: an ad for the allergy medication Claritin contained slogans such as "Clear days and nights are here" and "It's time for Claritin", and asked viewers to call a phone number or consult their doctor for more information.

In 1997, the FDA issued new guidelines that were intended to make DTCA on radio and television less burdensome; it ruled that informing the audience of where the "brief summary" of risk information can be obtained (such as a magazine ad, phone hotline, or website) constituted "adequate provision", and thus relieved them from being included in the ad. The FDA also recognized reminder ads (such as the aforementioned Claritin ad) as not being subject to these rules, since they do not contain claims or statements regarding the indications and benefits of the medication.

The industry quickly took advantage of the new guidelines: by 1998, advertising spending on DTCA had reached $1.12 billion. Despite this growth, there were concerns that some ads had an insufficient focus on properly discussing the product, while concerns were also shown for inappropriate demographic targeting, such as the advertising of erectile dysfunction medications during programming that may be widely watched by children. In 2005, Pharmaceutical Research and Manufacturers of America (PhRMA) instituted new voluntary guidelines for DTCA, including requirements to voluntarily submit ads to the FDA for review and educate health professionals on new medications before an advertising campaign commences, use clear language in advertising, obtain appropriate age targeting for advertisements involving subject matter that may be inappropriate to certain audiences, and to not use "reminder" ads. By 2011, spending on pharmaceutical advertising had grown to approximately US$4.5 billion per year, and increased to $5.2 billion by 2016.

With the increasing spending, DTCA began to face opposition. In 2015, the American Medical Association's house of delegates voted in favor of a motion supporting the prohibition of DTCA, arguing that these marketing efforts contribute to the high cost of drugs, and "inflates demand for new and more expensive drugs, even when these drugs may not be appropriate". On March 4, 2016, Senator Al Franken introduced the Protecting Americans from Drug Marketing Act, which proposed the removal of tax breaks for pharmaceutical companies who engage in DTCA. Franken similarly showed concerns that the industry was spending too much on marketing. In a similar move, representative Rosa DeLauro called for a three-year moratorium on advertising of newly-approved prescription drugs.

On May 8, 2019, the Department of Health and Human Services (HHS) approved a mandate for list prices to be displayed in advertising for any prescription that costs $35 or higher for 30 days of treatment. Ads could also include price comparisons against competitors. PhRMA objected to the rule, arguing that they do not reflect what patients would typically pay under insurance coverage (the rule did require display of a disclaimer stating that those with health insurance may pay a different amount). When the rule was proposed in October 2018, PhRMA stated that its members would commit to directing viewers toward detailed pricing information published online (including possible out-of-pocket costs, and information on financial support options). However, the HHS argued that list prices would help patients calculate how much they would pay, especially if they have not yet met their insurance deductible, or the drug is not covered by their insurance. Secretary of Health and Human Services Alex Azar compared the proposed requirement to similar regulations involving list prices for automobiles. On July 8, 2019, shortly before it was to take effect, the rule was struck down by DC district judge Amit Mehta, who ruled that it overstepped the HHS' authority.

In November 2024, the FDA adopted new standards requiring that radio and television ads for drugs "be presented in consumer-friendly language" and avoid unclear terminology "readily subject to different interpretations", and that the reading of side effects and the name of the drug be conducted in a "clear, conspicuous, and neutral manner", taking into account the pacing and clarity of the speech.

In September 2025, President Donald Trump issued a memorandum stated that he had directed the FDA to take additional steps to enforce its regulatory requirements for DTCA. Health secretary Robert F. Kennedy Jr. has been critical of DTCA and called for the removal of the "loophole" allowing television commercials to not include a summary of all side effects.

==== Portrayals in media ====
The regulations for DTCA have led to drug commercials having formulaic elements that are frequently satirized in popular culture, such as the juxtaposition of lighthearted footage unrelated to the drug with the mandated reading of side effects. The long-running variety show Saturday Night Live has featured sketches with parody commercials for drugs, many of which featuring exaggerated side effects (such as "Annuelle"—a parody of Seasonale that lets women have their period only once per-year, at the cost of having extreme PMS symptoms when it does occur, and "Ozempic for Ramadan"—whose side effects include "nausea, headache, and going straight to hell") or inane purposes (such as "Swiftamine", a medication for people who experience onset vertigo after realizing they love Taylor Swift). The Adult Swim short Unedited Footage of a Bear similarly begins as a stereotypical commercial for the fictitious medication Claridryl, but slowly segues into a psychological horror short film involving the woman portrayed in the ad.
