= Max Pemberton (doctor) =

British doctor and writer

Max Pemberton is a British medical doctor, journalist and author. He works full-time as a psychiatrist in the National Health Service (NHS). He is a weekly columnist for the Daily Mail, writing comment on news events concerning culture, social and ethical issues, the politics of health care and the NHS. Before his move to the Daily Mail, he was a columnist for the Daily Telegraph. He also writes a monthly column for Reader's Digest and is a regular contributor to The Spectator. He is the editor of Spectator Health, a quarterly supplement from The Spectator.

== Background and early life ==
Pemberton was born ca. 1979 and brought up in London. His parents were initially resistant to him going to medical school due to concerns about the cost and wanted him to do an apprenticeship in a Mars bar factory instead. They eventually relented on condition he agreed to fund his studies for himself. He therefore began his career in journalism while at medical school to support himself financially through his studies: "I started working in journalism out of necessity. It was a way of earning money that was compatible with the time commitments of university. In the evenings I wrote magazine pieces, advertising copy, material for websites. I even wrote poems for the inside of birthday cards."

He trained at University College London. While at medical school he also completed a degree in anthropology, for which he was awarded a first. At the age of 23, just before graduating in medicine, he was given a column by The Daily Telegraph after he wrote an unsolicited letter to the then editor, Charles Moore, with three sample columns. He has said that he manages to fit in his writing with his medical career by never going on holiday and not having a television.

== Journalism ==
He first started writing for The Daily Telegraph in August 2003. After the publication of his first book in 2008, the title of his column in The Daily Telegraph changed from Trust Me I'm A (Junior) Doctor to Finger on the Pulse. He began writing more in response to news events. Later still, his column was relaunched in a more prominent position under simply 'Max Pemberton'. His column was published every Monday.

He is a staunch advocate for the NHS. He is critical of the government's introduction of PFI in the NHS and opposes the introduction of the NHS patient record database. He has also spoken out against the way the European Working Time Directive has been implemented by NHS trusts and about MTAS and MMC. He often writes about the rights of older people and those with mental illness. He is gay and has written against the ban on gay people donating blood in the UK and in support of gay adoption and the impact of homophobic bullying He has also written in support of gay marriage.

He has been critical of the adoption by NHS trusts of infection control policies such as 'bare below the elbows' which, he says, have no evidence to support them and has criticised the Department of Health for ignoring reports suggesting that the biggest factor in reducing the spread of hospital infections is bed occupancy rate. While being interviewed on the Today programme, he claimed that trusts were asking junior doctors to lie on monitoring forms and falsify the number of hours they really worked. He quoted research conducted by the Royal College of Surgeons to support this which found that 50 per cent of all junior doctors reported being asked to lie about the hours they worked.

He also wrote features and interviews for the Telegraph and provided the medical opinion for the weekly Spa Spy column. He writes a short story for Reader's Digest each month and has also written a variety of health related features and columns.

In April 2015 he announced that after 12 years he was leaving the Telegraph and moving his column to the Daily Mail. His column is in the Saturday edition of the Daily Mail and focuses on mental health and social issues. He also writes widely throughout the paper on social, cultural and ethical issues, the politics of healthcare and the NHS.

=== The Great ADHD Myth? (2026) ===
Pemberton presented the Channel 4 documentary The Great ADHD Myth?, which aired on 18 August 2026. The programme was criticised, including by the Royal College of Psychiatrists and the charity ADHD UK, for its characterisation of ADHD as a "social construct".

The documentary asked whether ADHD was a neurodevelopmental disorder or "just a social construct", and concluded that it was the latter. The BMJ reported that the programme provoked a backlash from experts, including criticism that it presented a one-sided account of the evidence and claims that children were being medicated for socially acceptable behaviour.

The Royal College of Psychiatrists said that the way neurodevelopmental conditions are discussed could fuel stigma and discourage people from seeking support and treatment. The College stated that research suggested that ADHD affected 3–5% of the population and that the condition remained under-recognised, under-diagnosed and under-treated in the United Kingdom. It also said that ADHD diagnosis required a comprehensive clinical assessment rather than questionnaires alone, and advised people wishing to stop ADHD medication to consult their doctor first.

The Royal College of General Practitioners stated that comments by Iona Heath, a former president of the College who appeared in the documentary, had not been made on behalf of the College. The RCGP said that it recognised ADHD as a neurodevelopmental condition and supported evidence-based care in accordance with national guidance.

Neuroscientist Katya Rubia, who was interviewed for the documentary, said that her hours-long interview had been “cherry-picked” to support the programme’s portrayal of ADHD as a myth, describing the programme as biased and irresponsible. Clinician scientist Anita Thapar of Cardiff University, who chaired the Independent ADHD Taskforce, criticised the documentary for not using experts in clinical ADHD research and for likening ADHD medication to corporal punishment.

The programme was also criticised by Adam Dance, a Liberal Democrat member of Parliament with ADHD, who described parts of it as “unfactual” and said that it risked adding to the stigma experienced by people with the condition. Channel 4 defended the documentary, saying that it did not deny the lived experience of people diagnosed with ADHD but presented the views of medical experts who questioned conventional understandings of the condition.

== Books ==
His first book, Trust Me I'm A (Junior) Doctor, published by Hodder and Stoughton, recounted his first year working as a doctor in the NHS and was based on his first year of columns for The Daily Telegraph. It was serialised as book of the week on BBC Radio 4. His second book Where Does It Hurt? details his time working in an outreach project for the homeless and people addicted to drugs. His third book, The Doctor Will See You Now, was published in 2011 and is set in a hospital covering general medicine, A&E and dementia. All his books feature the same set of characters, which he says are loosely based on his friends He has also written one self-help book, How To Stop Smoking With CBT, published in January 2015.

== Politics ==
In 2013 he said that he is non-partisan, and that he prefers to assess political policies on their merits rather than allying with a political party; his column has both criticised and supported the main political parties at various times. He describes his political leanings as libertarian although divulged that he voted for the Liberal Democrats in the 2010 United Kingdom general election because he "thought that the NHS would be safest in their hands." However, he subsequently criticised them on their support for the Health and Social Care Bill, saying of the Liberal Democrats that he "had failed to take into account the sweet allure of power, the heady top notes of which they have tasted since sipping at the poisoned chalice of coalition government."

He was particularly critical of the Coalition government's Health and Social Care Act, writing a series of articles in the Telegraph denouncing the plans for which he won the 2013 Medical Journalists' Association Prize.

== Pen name ==
The name Max Pemberton was originally a pen name. He explained the reason he initially chose to work in the media under a different name to the one he practised medicine under was because: "I want to make a clear distinction between being a writer and a journalist and being a doctor. I want to send out a signal to my patients that this is different, that I am a clinician." However, he said that he had become so used to being referred to by this name that he preferred it and that his partner called him by this name as well. After the GMC released guidelines on the use of pen names for doctors, Pemberton decided to legally change his name to his pen name and now practises under this name as a doctor as well.

== Personal life ==
Pemberton is gay. He lives in the Barbican Estate, London. He is related to the Victorian novelist Max Pemberton. As well as a degree in medicine, he also holds a first class honours degree in Anthropology. He is the patron of the charity CW Friend, which provides information and support to the Lesbian, Gay, Bisexual and Trans community in the Midlands. He is also the patron of Epsom Mental Health Week.

== Awards ==
- Royal College of Psychiatrists Morris Markowe Public Education Prize
- Royal College of Psychiatrists Public Educator of the Year Award 2010
- Mind Journalist of the Year Award 2010
- Medical Journalists' Association Winter Awards 2012 Witty Writing Award
- Medical Journalists' Association Winter Awards 2012 Interviewer of the Year (commendation)
- Medical Journalists' Association Summer Awards 2013 Story of the Year Award
- Stonewall Journalist of the Year 2013 shortlisted
