= Brighton Collaboration =

Global vaccine safety research network

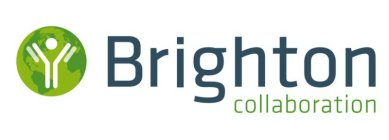
- Formation: 2000
- Type: Non-profit research network
- Purpose: Vaccine safety standardization
- Headquarters: Basel, Switzerland
- Region served: Worldwide
- Parent organization: Task Force for Global Health
- Affiliations: Coalition for Epidemic Preparedness Innovations
- Website: brightoncollaboration.org

The Brighton Collaboration (BC) is a global non-profit research network dedicated to advancing the science of vaccine safety. Historically, it began by enhancing the quality and comparability of vaccine safety data through standardized tools and methods. It develops standardized case definitions, data collection guidelines, and related tools for vaccine safety monitoring around the world. Since 2019, the Collaboration has functioned as a program under the Task Force for Global Health. Its work is recognized and referenced by international entities such as the World Health Organization (WHO), European Medicines Agency (EMA), and the U.S. Food and Drug Administration (FDA).

== Mission and priorities ==
The mission of the Brighton Collaboration is to enhance the science of vaccine research by providing standardized, validated, and objective methods for monitoring safety profiles and assessing benefit–risk ratios. Guided by its strategic vision for the safest and most effective vaccines founded on rigorous science, the Collaboration pursues five scientific priority areas:

- Setting standards – enhancing data comparability across clinical trials, surveillance systems, and post-licensure studies.
- Clinical assessment – facilitating rapid information exchange through an international expert community.
- Data sharing – promoting international collaborative observational studies.
- Public confidence – monitoring and countering misinformation related to vaccine safety.
- Capacity building – strengthening vaccine safety capabilities globally through training and knowledge transfer.

== History ==
The idea for the Brighton Collaboration emerged in 1999 during international discussions on the need for harmonized definitions of adverse events following immunization (AEFI), following a presentation by Robert T. Chen at a scientific vaccine conference in Brighton, England. An expert group including Harald Heijbel, Ulrich Heininger, Tom Jefferson, and Elisabeth Loupi helped shape the early concept.

In 2000, an official launch meeting was held in Verona. Kathrin S. Kohl (then at the US Centers for Disease Control and Prevention) and Jan Bonhoeffer (University Children’s Hospital Basel) coordinated the emerging international network. The World Health Organization joined as an observer and early funding agency.

From 2001 to 2003, the “Brighton Method” for defining AEFI by three levels of diagnostic certainty (with level 1 representing the highest level of specificity) was established, and the network rapidly expanded to hundreds of active participants across multiple continents. The Brighton Collaboration Foundation was established in 2004 as a Swiss non-profit organization with seed capital from University Children’s Hospital Basel.

In 2005 the Collaboration launched its first online collaboration platform and published the initial six AEFI case definitions and associated guidelines. Between 2006 and 2008, Brighton case definitions and guidelines were recommended by major bodies, including the Council for International Organizations of Medical Sciences (CIOMS) and the European Centre for Disease Prevention and Control (ECDC); the FDA also began to recognize their use in regulatory and safety work.

Between 2010 and 2012, EMA formally endorsed the use of Brighton standards in its guidance on vaccine pharmacovigilance. In the same period, the first evaluation method for case definitions and the ABC-Tool for automated case classification were introduced, the Brighton Foundation US was registered as a public charity, and the Collaboration published background rate studies covering more than 260 million person–years together with the first international risk assessment of Guillain–Barré syndrome following H1N1 vaccination, contributing to the WHO Vaccine Safety Blueprint.

In 2013, Brighton played a central role in building the ADVANCE consortium, managed the Vaccine Safety Quarterly newsletter (reaching over 4,000 members), supported Vaccine.GRID for large-scale observational safety studies, and organized an international symposium in Shanghai. The CDC commissioned the global SOMNIA narcolepsy study.

Between 2015 and 2016, the Collaboration created the Clinical Advisory Forum of Experts (CAFE), developed viral vector vaccine safety templates, and launched a Journal Club for vaccine safety discussions. The GAIA Network (Global Alignment of Immunization Safety Assessment in Pregnancy) was established to harmonize immunization safety in pregnancy, particularly in low- and middle-income countries.

In 2017, research on the association between H1N1 vaccination and narcolepsy was presented to the WHO Global Advisory Committee on Vaccine Safety. GAIA Phase II received funding from the Bill & Melinda Gates Foundation, the organization launched a virtual “Academy” and a new website, and an internship memorandum of understanding with Taiwan CDC was established.

In 2019, the Brighton Collaboration dissolved as a Swiss partnership and reconstituted as a program of the Task Force for Global Health in order to strengthen sustainability and integration with other global health initiatives.

Between 2019 and 2021, Brighton and the Coalition for Epidemic Preparedness Innovations (CEPI) launched the Safety Platform for Emergency vACcines (SPEAC) project to harmonize safety assessment for CEPI-supported vaccine development. The WHO Global Advisory Committee on Vaccine Safety recommended Brighton templates for benefit–risk assessment and for vector-based Ebola vaccines. The Centers for Disease Control and Prevention funded CARESAFE under the COVIP initiative to strengthen pharmacovigilance capacity in low- and middle-income countries.

In 2022, CEPI and Brighton introduced SPEAC 2.0 to align with the “100 Days Mission”, with an expanded focus on digital transformation, special populations, and active surveillance in low- and middle-income countries.

== Activities ==
Brighton Collaboration convenes expert working groups to develop standardized case definitions and companion guidelines for vaccine safety data collection and analysis. These tools are continually updated as new scientific evidence emerges, for example the 2022 revision of the Brighton anaphylaxis case definition and subsequent work related to COVID-19 vaccines.

The Collaboration also produces benefit–risk assessment templates and lists of adverse events of special interest (AESI) to aid clinical research and pharmacovigilance. It has led or contributed to thematic projects such as GAIA, which focuses on maternal immunization safety, especially in low- and middle-income settings.

== Partnerships ==
Through the SPEAC (Safety Platform for Emergency vACcines) project, funded by CEPI, Brighton Collaboration supports safety standardization for CEPI-backed vaccine development. SPEAC is described by WHO’s Vaccine Safety Net as a CEPI-funded project of the Brighton Collaboration, a program of the Task Force for Global Health, providing tools, resources, and expertise across the vaccine development process.

== Impact and use ==
Brighton Collaboration definitions and tools inform regulatory guidance in pharmacovigilance. EMA’s good pharmacovigilance practice guidance explicitly refers to Brighton case definitions when available. Brighton tools are used by agencies such as the FDA, CDC, ECDC, and WHO/PAHO in outbreak surveillance, benefit–risk assessments, and vaccine safety reviews. They have been incorporated into safety surveillance frameworks during public health emergencies such as the COVID-19 pandemic.

== Reception ==
Brighton Collaboration’s case definitions and tools have been widely adopted in vaccine safety monitoring and regulatory guidance. They are recognized for bringing consistency and comparability to vaccine safety data worldwide. Scientific discussions have occasionally noted limitations when certain definitions are used outside their intended context—for example, applying research-focused criteria directly to clinical diagnosis of anaphylaxis—but these discussions emphasize that Brighton definitions were designed primarily for standardized surveillance and research, where they continue to play an important role in harmonizing data across studies and regions.

== Organization ==
As a program within the Task Force for Global Health, Brighton Collaboration coordinates international volunteer working groups and scientific advisors who develop, review, and update its case definitions, templates, and tools. The Collaboration works with partners including WHO, CIOMS, EMA, FDA, CDC, ECDC and others on the development, testing, and application of standardized vaccine safety methods.

== See also ==
- Vaccine safety
- Pharmacovigilance
