= AllTrials =

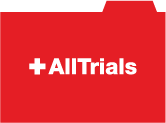
- Formation: 9 January 2013; 13 years ago
- Type: International advocacy campaign
- Purpose: Clinical trial registration and results reporting
- Region served: Worldwide

AllTrials (sometimes called All Trials or AllTrials.net) is a project advocating that clinical research adopt the principles of open research, and that all clinical trials should be listed in a clinical trials registry, and their results should always be shared as open data.

AllTrials is an international initiative of Bad Science, BMJ, Centre for Evidence-based Medicine, Cochrane Collaboration, James Lind Initiative, PLOS and Sense about Science and is being led in the US by Sense about Science USA, Dartmouth's Geisel School of Medicine and the Dartmouth Institute for Health Policy & Clinical Practice. At the center of the organization is a petition signed by over 85,000 individuals and 599 organizations, as of August 2025.

Ben Goldacre, author of Bad Science and Bad Pharma, is a founder of the campaign and its most public spokesperson. In 2016, he participated in the launch of the OpenTrials database.

== Operations ==
The project is a reaction to under-reporting of research.

A substantial proportion (estimates range from one-third to one-half) of medical research goes unpublished. It has also been shown that negative findings are less likely to be published than positive ones, even in the absence of conflicts of interest.

Much medical research is done by the pharmaceutical industry, which have a conflict of interest reporting results which may hurt sales of their products. There is a measurable funding bias in reporting; studies have shown that published drug studies funded by pharmaceutical companies are much more likely to support the use of the tested drug than studies with other funding. Industry-funded trials are also less likely to be published.

If the statistical methods used to analyse the trial are not chosen before the study it started, there is a danger that researchers will intentionally or unintentionally pick the method that gives the results they expect, or which gives the most significant results. This makes the analysis statistically invalid.

Not publishing trials which fail to find a clear effect exposes trial volunteers to pointless risk and wastes research effort (as the same trial is repeated over and over). It also biases the medical literature, making it report effects where none exist (since, given enough trials, eventually one will find a difference by pure chance).

Pre-trial registration makes non-publication and changes in analysis methods obvious to medical reviewers. It also enables authors of meta-studies to track down and analyse missing data. Finally, it lets doctors and patients know when a trial is looking for volunteers.

There are other sources of bias, such as the conditions sometimes attached to funding by funding agencies with a financial interest in the trial's outcome. Medical researchers may be asked to agree to allow the funding agency to censor results. Some funding agencies may also refuse to give the medical researcher access to the raw data, giving them only the finished analysis, or even a draft paper, and asking them to put their name to it. This is not acceptable academic practice, and some academic journals require that authors sign a statement that they have not entered into such agreements.

Ben Goldacre, a physician and spokesperson for the campaign, would like to address the systematic flaws in clinical research which cause data to be lost after it is gathered.

== Coverage ==
The campaign has been widely covered, and supported, in the academic press. The British Medical Journal and PLOS are founding members. Nature and The Lancet both published supportive articles in January 2014.

There has also been mainstream media coverage.

== Controversy ==
There has been criticism from the Pharmaceutical Research and Manufacturers of America (PhRMA), with senior vice-president Matt Bennett saying that trial data disclosure measures which AllTrials has recommended to the European Medicines Agency "could risk patient privacy, lead to fewer clinical trials, and result in fewer new medicines to meet patient needs and improve health.".

AllTrials have published a detailed statement of exactly what they want to see published, which states "The AllTrials campaign is not calling for individual patient data to be made publicly available".

A 2012 editorial published by senior regulators from the European Medicines agency largely agreed with AllTrials, saying "We consider it neither desirable nor realistic to maintain the status quo of limited availability of regulatory trials data". They were also of the opinion that adequate standards for protection of personal data could be written. However, they warned that third party reanalysis was neither a guarantee of quality nor of lack of conflict of interest, which, in the worst case, could lead to negative public health consequences.

They suggested that reanalyses should therefore be subject to the same regulations as sponsor analyses, such as registering analysis plans. They argued against completely unrestricted access to data, but in favor of broader access. AllTrials is not calling for completely unrestricted access to raw data, so the scope of disagreements is limited to what restrictions should be in place.

== Supporters ==
The campaign is an initiative of Sense about Science, Centre for Evidence Based Medicine, The Dartmouth Institute for Health Policy and Clinical Practice, James Lind Alliance, Cochrane Collaboration, BMJ Group, PLOS, and Bad Science. The petition statement of AllTrials has been signed by organizations including Wellcome Trust, British Library, Medical Research Council (UK), British Heart Foundation, Institute for Quality and Efficiency in Health Care, National Institute for Health and Care Excellence, BioMed Central, National Physicians Alliance, Royal Society of Medicine, Health Research Authority, American Medical Student Association, GlaxoSmithKline, and others.

As of May 2017, The AllTrials petition has been signed by 90,282 people and 721 organisations. In October 2016, AllTrials published a road map detailing steps that various types of organisations can take to get more trials registered and more results reported.

85 investors with >€3.5 trillion (£2.45trn; $3.83trn) of investments have supported AllTrials (as of July 2015), with Peter van der Werf of RobecoSAM saying: "We deem this to be a financially material factor and encourage all companies to gain credibility regarding their approach to clinical trial transparency by signing up to the AllTrials principles.". The Laura and John Arnold Foundation provided early and ongoing financial support.

The original policy of the Coalition for Epidemic Preparedness Innovations required that funded parties pre-register any trials in a clinical trials registry, publish results within a year of study completion (except with compelling reason and permission of CEPI), publish results in open-access articles, and have mechanisms for securely sharing underlying data and results, including negative results, in a way that preserves trial volunteer privacy. In May 2018 the CEPI proposed changing the policy to remove these provisions. The policy was changed by the CEPI in December 2018.

== Opponents ==
The European Federation of Pharmaceutical Industries and Associations and Pharmaceutical Research and Manufacturers of America have expressed interest in lobbying against the campaign. Campaign supporters criticized Hoffmann-La Roche's plans to be more open but not to the extent requested by AllTrials.

== See also ==
- Clinical data repository
- Conflicts of interest in academic publishing
- Monitoring in clinical trials
- Metascience
- Privacy for research participants
- Evidence-based medicine
- Clinical trials publication
- Censoring (clinical trials)
