= Bad Science (Goldacre book) =

2008 book by Ben Goldacre

- First edition cover
- Author: Ben Goldacre
- Language: English
- Subject: Pseudoscience
- Genre: Non-fiction
- Publisher: Fourth Estate
- Publication date: September 2008
- Publication place: United Kingdom
- Media type: Print (Paperback)
- Pages: 338
- ISBN: 978-0-00-724019-7
- OCLC: 259713114
- Dewey Decimal: 500 22
- LC Class: Q172.5.E77 G65 2008

Bad Science is a book written by Ben Goldacre which criticises certain physicians and the media for a lack of critical thinking and misunderstanding of evidence and statistics which is detrimental to the public understanding of science. In Bad Science, Goldacre explains basic scientific principles to demonstrate the importance of robust research methods, experimental design, and analysis to make informed judgements and conclusions of evidence-based medicine. Bad Science is described as an engaging and inspirational book, written in simple language and occasional humour, to effectively explain academic concepts to the reader.

Bad Science was originally published in the UK by Fourth Estate in September 2008 and later editions have since been published through HarperCollins Publishers.

The book has generally been well-received with positive reviews by the British Medical Journal and the Daily Telegraph. Bad Science reached the Top 10 bestseller list for Amazon Books and was shortlisted for the BBC Samuel Johnson Prize for Non-Fiction 2009.

== Synopsis ==
Each chapter deals with a specific aspect of bad science, often to illustrate a wider point. For example, the chapter on homeopathy becomes the point where he explains the placebo effect, regression to the mean (that is, the natural cycle of the disease), placebo-controlled trials (including the need for randomisation and double blinding), meta-analyses like the Cochrane Collaboration and publication bias.

=== Introduction ===
Goldacre begins by highlighting that the substandard understanding of statistics and evidence-based medicine within our society leads to the misrepresentation of science within the media. Ultimately, constant bombardment from the media and advertising is detrimental and misleading public understanding of science. Throughout this book, Goldacre aims to provide knowledge of bad science practices to help readers differentiate the truth from the lies and form their own judgement of science.

=== Chapter 1: "Matter" ===
Goldacre recognised that the scientific knowledge of marketers and journalists is often rudimentary, relying on basic notions and ideas from GCSE-level science. Consequently, through basic reasoning errors, they have the power to misinterpret evidence and mislead public understanding. Throughout this chapter, Goldacre debunks pseudoscientific claims within the alternative medicine phenomenon of detoxification, using simple science experiments to demonstrate the basic principles of experimental design and analysis. With three examples Goldacre shows that theatre is a common feature of detox products and that detox itself has no scientific meaning but instead is a marketing innovation based on cultural rituals.

=== Chapter 2: "Brain Gym" ===
Goldacre slams Brain Gym as transparent pseudoscientific nonsense. At the time the book was written, Brain Gym was promoted by local education authorities and practised in hundreds of schools across the country. Goldacre explains how the use of quackery- decorating simple explanations with scientific terminology- can convince non-specialists that a series of complex exercises can ‘enhance the experience of whole brain learning’. As such, children were systematically fed pseudoscience

=== Chapter 3: The Progenium XY Complex ===
The cosmetic industry yields high profit from elegantly communicated pseudoscience. Often targeted at young women, Goldacre explains that cosmetic advertisement portrays science as incomprehensible rather than a balance between evidence and theory. He suggests that marketing teams incorporate convincing molecular language to suggest that particular ingredients within cosmetic products can improve skin appearance. In fact, such ‘magical’ ingredients are present at negligible concentrations as they often cause side effects. It is also difficult to alter skin appearance with cosmetic intervention as homeostatic feedback systems tightly regulate biology.

=== Chapter 4: "Homeopathy" ===
Homeopathy, an alternative medicine based on the theory that ‘like cures like’ and that very high dilutions strengthen the treatment. While Goldacre suggests "conceptual holes" in the theory, his main issue is that it ultimately does not work. He explains how evidence-based medicine works and how homeopathy has not met these standards.

=== Chapter 5: "The Placebo Effect" ===
The placebo effect. Already introduced in the previous chapter, Goldacre discusses it in further detail. He notes factors that can enhance the placebo effect, such as higher prices, fancy packaging, theatrical procedures and a confident attitude in the doctor. He also discusses the ethical issues of the placebo. He concludes the placebo effect is possibly justifiable if used in conjunction with effective conventional treatments, but it does not justify alternative medicine.

=== Chapter 6: "The Nonsense du Jour" ===
Nutritionism, which Goldacre does not consider to be proper science but has been accepted as so by the media. He says nutritionists often misrepresent legitimate scientific research, make claims based on weak observations, over-interpreted surrogate outcomes in animal and tissue culture experiments and cherry picked published research.

=== Chapter 7: "Dr Gillian McKeith PhD" ===
Gillian McKeith, a nutritionist who presented You Are What You Eat on Channel 4. Though presented as a medical doctor, her degree was neither medical nor accredited. Goldacre noted factual errors in her claims, such as those on chlorophyll. He compares her writings and advice to a Melanesian cargo cult; it looked scientific but lacked the substance. Goldacre argues that micro-regulating a person's diet has little effect on their health, and it is more important to try to lead a generally healthy lifestyle. He also argues that general health of the population correlates with affluence better than anything else.

=== Chapter 8: "Pill Solves Complex Social Problem" ===
The claim that fish oil capsules make children smarter, especially the "Durham trial" that promoted these. Goldacre notes these trials lacked control groups and were wide open to a range of confounding factors. He notes how the education authorities failed to publish any results and backtracked on earlier claims. He discusses the media's preference for simple science stories and role in promoting dubious health products. Parallels are drawn between the Equazen company behind the Durham fish oil trials and the Efamol company's promotion of evening primrose oil.

=== Chapter 9: "Professor Patrick Holford" ===
Patrick Holford, a best-selling author, media commentator, businessman and founder of the Institute for Optimum Nutrition (which has trained most of the UK's "nutrition therapists"). Goldacre notes how Holford helped present nutritionism as a scientific discipline to the media, and forged links with some British universities. He says Holford is promoting unproven claims about vitamin pills by misinterpreting and cherry picking favourable results from medical literature.

=== Chapter 10: " The Doctor Will Sue You Now" ===
Matthias Rath, a vitamin salesman. This chapter was not present in the original edition, as Rath was suing Goldacre at the time for libel. After Goldacre won, it has been included in later editions and Goldacre has made it freely available online. In this chapter, he discusses how Rath travelled to Africa to promote vitamin pills as treatments for HIV/AIDS, and how these ideas were met with sympathy by the government of Thabo Mbeki in South Africa.

=== Chapter 11: "Is Mainstream Medicine Evil?" ===
Goldacre notes that a surprisingly low proportion of conventional medical activity (50 to 80%) is truly "evidence-based". The efforts of the medical profession to weed out bad treatments are seen to be hampered by the withholding or distortion of evidence by drug companies. He explains the science and economics of drug development, with criticism of the lack of independence of industrial research and the neglect of Third World diseases. Some underhand tricks used by drug companies to engineer positive trial results for their products are explored. The publication bias produced by researchers not publishing negative results is illustrated with funnel plots. Examples are made of the SSRI antidepressants and Vioxx drugs. Reform of trials registers to prevent abuses is proposed. The ethics of drug advertising and manipulation of patient advocacy groups are questioned.

=== Chapter 12: "How the Media Promote the Public Misunderstanding of Science" ===
The role of media in misrepresenting science. Goldacre blames this on the preponderance of humanities graduates in journalism, and the media for wacky, breakthrough or scare stories. This includes stories about formulas for "the perfect boiled egg" or "most depressing day of the year" and a speculation that the human race will evolve into two separate races. These were publicity stunts for companies. Goldacre blames the lack of sensational medical breakthroughs since a golden age of discovery between 1935 and 1975, with medicine making only gradual improvements since.

=== Chapter 13: "Why Clever People Believe Stupid Things" ===
Cognitive biases. In a chapter titled "Why Clever People Believe Stupid Things", Goldacre explains some of the appeal of alternative medicine ideas. Biases mentioned include confirmation bias, the availability heuristic, illusory superiority and the clustering illusion (the misperception of random data). It also discusses Solomon Asch's classic study of social conformity.

=== Chapter 14: "Bad Stats" ===
The cases of Sally Clark and Lucia de Berk. Goldacre says poor understanding and presentation of statistics played an important part in their criminal trials.

=== Chapter 15: "Health Scares" ===
The MRSA hoax. Goldacre accuses the press of selectively choosing to use a "laboratory" that kept giving positive MRSA results when other pathology labs were producing none. The laboratory was a garden shed, run by Chris Malyszewicz, who was treated by the press as an "expert" but had no relevant qualifications. Goldacre believes the press were far more to blame for the misinformation than Malyszewicz. Goldacre argues that journalists have been poor at uncovering medical scandals. For example, it was doctors and not journalists who discovered the thalidomide tragedy; only covering well the political issue of compensation.

=== Chapter 16: "The Media's MMR Hoax" ===
Andrew Wakefield and the MMR vaccine controversy. Goldacre argues that while Wakefield's paper began the hoax about MMR causing autism, the greatest blame for the misinformation lies with the media, who should have realised that Wakefield's paper provided no evidence of a link.

=== Index ===
The hardback and first paperback editions did not include an index. Several indexes were prepared by bloggers, including one prepared by Oliblog. The latest paperback issue includes a full index.

== See also ==
- Bad Pharma (2012) by Ben Goldacre
- AllTrials
- Pseudoscience
- Data Fabrication
- Publication Bias
- Cherry Picking
- Data Dredging
- HARKing
- Replication Crisis
