= Michael Goldacre =

Australian-born British doctor

Michael John Goldacre (born 3 January 1944 in Melbourne, Australia) is an Australian-born British medical doctor and academic. He has been a fellow of Magdalen College since 1985 and was awarded a Title of Distinction as Professor of Public Health at the University of Oxford in 2002. He is a Fellow of the Royal College of Physicians, a Fellow of the Faculty of Public Health, and a Fellow of the Royal Society of Medicine.

== Early life ==
Michael Goldacre was born on 3 January 1944 in Melbourne, Australia. His great-great-grandfather was journalist and politician Sir Henry Parkes, father of the Australian Federation. He was educated at Bec School, a grammar school in London, England. He studied medicine at Magdalen College, Oxford, graduating with a Bachelor of Arts (BA) degree, with first class honours, and at University College Hospital, London, graduating with Bachelor of Medicine, Bachelor of Surgery (BM BCh) degrees.

== Career ==
He has been at the University of Oxford since 1974, when he was appointed clinical lecturer in social and community medicine. He was the Director of the Unit of Health-Care Epidemiology and the Oxford Record Linkage Study from 1986 to 2015. He was also scientific director of the South East England Public Health Observatory from 2000 until 2005, and director of the UK Medical Careers Research Group from 1993 to 2015.

== Personal life ==
In 1973 he married Australian singer Susan M Traynor, who performed in the band Fox and as Noosha Fox, in Wandsworth, London. One of their sons is the science writer Ben Goldacre.
