= Paul Glasziou =

Australian academic physician (born 1954)

Paul Philip Glasziou AO (born 21 May 1954) is an Australian academic physician known for his research in evidence-based medicine. He is Professor of Evidence-Based Medicine at Bond University, where he is also Director of the Faculty of Health Sciences and Medicine. He was the director of the Centre for Evidence-Based Medicine at the University of Oxford in England from 2003 to 2010. In July 2010, he received an NHMRC Australia Fellowship at Bond University. In March 2015, he was elected a fellow of the Australian Academy of Health and Medical Sciences. He was appointed an Officer of the Order of Australia in the 2021 Queen's Birthday Honours.
