= Tom Jefferson (epidemiologist) =

British epidemiologist

- Education
- Scientific career
- Workplaces: Cochrane Collaboration; Brighton Collaboration

Tom Jefferson is a British epidemiologist, based in Rome, Italy, who works for the Cochrane Collaboration. Jefferson is an author and editor of the Cochrane Collaboration's acute respiratory infections group, as well as part of four other Cochrane groups. He was also an advisor to the Italian National Agency for Regional Health Services.

In 1999, Jefferson was one of the founding members of the Brighton Collaboration along with Harald Heijbel, Ulrich Heininger, Robert Chen, and Elisabeth Loupi. He has worked on Cochrane reviews examining the effectiveness of the anti-viral oseltamivir and the influenza vaccine.

== Notable work ==
In 2009, Jefferson was hired by the governments of Britain and Australia to update a systematic review of oseltamivir. Initially he had a great deal of trouble getting results of the original trials. Previous researchers had published trials without seeing the underlying data and it appeared that some of the published papers used ghost writers. As the company, Roche, that did the trials refused to provide data for independent analysis, their conclusions in 2009 were that benefits could not be shown.

In 2011, Jefferson's team was provided 22,000 pages of data from the European Medicines Agency and Roche eventually provided 3,000 pages of data. In 2012, Jefferson was the lead author of another Cochrane review of this data which concluded that oseltamivir did not reduce the number of hospitalizations caused by influenza. Jefferson said that this review also found no evidence that oseltamivir stopped complications from the disease. The review is considered a landmark and is posted on the James Lind Library website which illustrates the development of fair tests of healthcare.

Jefferson is the lead author of a suite of Cochrane reviews on antivirals, influenza vaccines and physical interventions to interrupt the spread of acute respiratory infections. The reviews are either kept up to date or stabilized, meaning no new evidence is likely to become available. The earliest review date from 1996 and the latest is the fourth update of the physical interventions review (2020, currently undergoing its fifth update).

Jefferson has also reviewed the evidence of effects of editorial and grant giving peer review and co-written several reviews and topics on this subject. Currently he is assessing the evidence of transmission of SARS-CoV-2 and other respiratory pathogens and is co-editor of the Substack publication website Trust The Evidence. In his latest publication Jefferson and his fellows have concluded the presence of replication-competent SARS-CoV-2 on fomites, using evidence from viral culture studies.

A list of his publications and contributions is available on his personal website.

=== Controversies ===
In 2020, Tom Jefferson filed suit against Roche as a whistleblower under the U.S. False Claims Act. During the lawsuit he left the Cochrane group due to conflicts of interest because of the financial implications of his whistleblower status. When filing for a $4.5 billion judgement, Jefferson, if successful, would have received $630 million. After several legal setbacks, the lawsuit was withdrawn in 2024

Tom Jefferson was the lead author of a Cochrane review that found no evidence that interventions to promote mask wearing reduced the spread of COVID-19. The editor-in-chief of the Cochrane Library stated that the review had been "widely misinterpreted". Specifically, the review "examined whether interventions to promote mask wearing help to slow the spread of respiratory viruses" and "is not able to address the question of whether mask-wearing itself reduces people's risk of contracting or spreading respiratory viruses".

Science Historian Naomi Oreskes writing in Scientific American claimed that Jefferson had explicitly "promoted the misleading interpretation," and called the paper an example of "methodological fetishism."

== Publications ==
- Jefferson, T; Alderson, P; Wager, E; Davidoff, F (5 June 2002). "Effects of editorial peer review: a systematic review". JAMA. 287 (21): 2784–6. doi:10.1001/jama.287.21.2784. PMID 12038911.
- Jefferson, T; Wager, E; Davidoff, F (5 June 2002). "Measuring the quality of editorial peer review". JAMA. 287 (21): 2786–90. doi:10.1001/jama.287.21.2786. PMID 12038912.
- Jefferson, T; Di Pietrantonj, C; Debalini, MG; Rivetti, A; Demicheli, V (July 2009). "Inactivated influenza vaccines: methods, policies, and politics". Journal of Clinical Epidemiology. 62 (7): 677–86. doi:10.1016/j.jclinepi.2008.07.001. PMID 19124222.
- Jefferson, T.; Del Mar, C.; Dooley, L.; Ferroni, E.; Al-Ansary, L. A; Bawazeer, G. A; van Driel, M. L; Foxlee, R.; Rivetti, A. (22 September 2009). "Physical interventions to interrupt or reduce the spread of respiratory viruses: systematic review". BMJ. 339 (sep21 1): 77–80. doi:10.1136/bmj.b3675. PMC 2190272. PMID 18042961.
- Chan, An-Wen; Song, Fujian; Vickers, Andrew; Jefferson, Tom; Dickersin, Kay; Gøtzsche, Peter C; Harlan Krumholz; Ghersi, Davina; van der Worp, H Bart (January 2014). "Increasing value and reducing waste: addressing inaccessible research". The Lancet. 383 (9913): 257–266. doi:10.1016/S0140-6736(13)62296-5. PMC 4533904. PMID 24411650.
- Doshi, P.; Jefferson, T. (2 March 2015). "The evidence base for new drugs". BMJ. 350 (mar02 6): h952. doi:10.1136/bmj.h952. PMID 25731767. S2CID 206909443.
