= OpenSAFELY =

Medical statistics platform

OpenSAFELY is a secure analytics platform, interfacing to NHS patient records and enabling statistical analysis of them by medical researchers. The platform was originally a collaboration between DataLab at the University of Oxford, the EHR group at London School of Hygiene & Tropical Medicine, and electronic health record software companies. The platform is now developed by the Bennett Institute for Applied Data Science, part of Oxford University's Nuffield Department of Primary Care Health Sciences.

Initially, it has been used to make an analysis of the risk factors associated with deaths from COVID-19 in hospital in the UK. This is significant because the dataset is especially large, covering about 58 million patients. In 2023, the NHS announced that it would expand the use of the OpenSAFELY platform to help drive life-saving advances for other major diseases.

The platform interfaces with a secure database of pseudonymized primary care records, and only aggregated results are viewable by researchers. This allows researchers to access a large dataset necessary for identifying potential risk factors without the risks of exposing personal patient information.

In 2025 the OpenSAFELY project was awarded a package of funding from the Wellcome Trust, this included £7 million to analyse the outcomes of talking therapies across the NHS. A further £10 million was awarded to develop data infrastructure, including investigating "new methods for connecting diverse health datasets and enhanced analytical tools for researchers".
