= European Journal of Preventive Cardiology =

- Discipline: Cardiology
- Language: English
- Edited by: Massimo Francesco Piepoli

Publication details
- Former names: European Journal of Cardiovascular Prevention & Rehabilitation
- History: 1994-present
- Publisher: Oxford University Press
- Frequency: 18
- Impact factor: 8.4 (2023)

Standard abbreviations
- ISO 4: Eur. J. Prev. Cardiol.

Indexing
- ISSN: 2047-4873 (print); 2047-4881 (web)
- LCCN: 2003243585
- OCLC no.: 53323688

Links
- Journal homepage; Online access; Online archive

The European Journal of Preventive Cardiology is a peer-reviewed medical journal that covers research on the cardiovascular system. The journal's editor-in-chief is Prof Victor Aboyans (University of Limoges, France). It was established in 1994 as the European Journal of Cardiovascular Prevention & Rehabilitation and obtained its current title in 2012. It is currently published by Oxford University Press on behalf of the European Society of Cardiology.

== Abstracting and indexing ==
The European Journal of Preventive Cardiology is the Official Journal of the European Association for Preventive Cardiology of the European Society of Cardiology, dedicated to primary and secondary cardiovascular prevention and sports cardiology. It publishes 18 issues yearly and abstracted and indexed in Scopus and the Social Sciences Citation Index. According to the Journal Citation Reports, its 2022 impact factor is 8.4, ranking it 16th out of 220 journals in the category "Cardiac & Cardiovascular Systems". Areas of interests are Cardiovascular primary and secondary preventions, (including arterial hypertension, dyslipidaemia, diabetes, obesity, smoking cessation, healthy life style promotion), epidemiology, cardiac rehabilitation, exercise training and physiology, sport cardiology, population science intervention.
