= Ben Goldacre =

British physician and writer (born 1974)

Ben Goldacre MBE
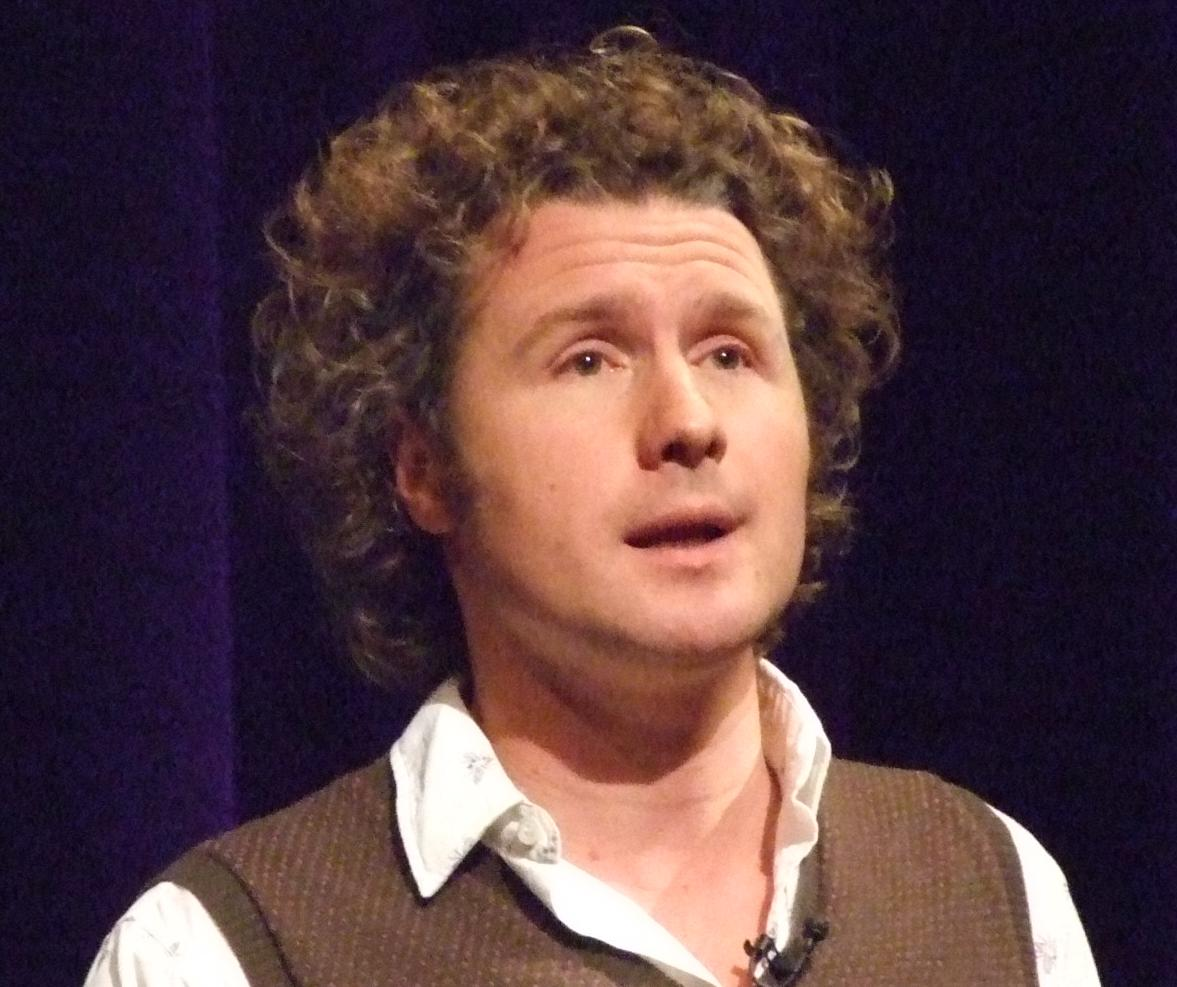
- Goldacre in 2009
- Born: Ben Michael Goldacre; 20 May 1974 (age 52); London, United Kingdom
- Education: Magdalen College, Oxford (BA); University College London (MBBS); King's College London (MA)
- Occupations: Author, journalist, physician, science writer and scientist
- Employers: Institute of Psychiatry; University of Milan; London School of Hygiene & Tropical Medicine; University of Oxford
- Known for: Bad Science (2008); Bad Pharma (2012); AllTrials
- Parent(s): Michael Goldacre; Susan Traynor
- Awards: ABSW best feature (2003, 2005); Statistical Excellence In Journalism Award of the Royal Statistical Society (2007)
- Scientific career
- Fields: Epidemiology; Clinical Informatics; Evidence Based Medicine; Reproducibility
- Website: www.phc.ox.ac.uk/team/ben-goldacre

Ben Michael Goldacre MBE (born 20 May 1974) is a British physician, academic and science writer. He is the first Bennett Professor of Evidence-Based Medicine and director of the Bennett Institute for Applied Data Science at the University of Oxford. He is a founder of the AllTrials campaign and OpenTrials, aiming to require open science practices in clinical trials.

Goldacre is known in particular for his Bad Science column in The Guardian, which he wrote between 2003 and 2011, and is the author of four books: Bad Science (2008), a critique of irrationality and certain forms of alternative medicine; Bad Pharma (2012), an examination of the pharmaceutical industry, its publishing and marketing practices, and its relationship with the medical profession; I Think You'll Find It's a Bit More Complicated Than That, a collection of his journalism; and Statins, about evidence-based medicine. Goldacre frequently delivers free talks about bad science; he describes himself as a "nerd evangelist".

== Early life and education ==
Goldacre is the son of Michael Goldacre, a professor of public health at the University of Oxford, and Susan Traynor (stage name Noosha Fox), lead singer of 1970s pop band Fox, both of whom are Australian. He is the nephew of Robyn Williams, a science journalist, and the great-great-grandson of Henry Parkes, politician and journalist who is considered the father of the Australian Federation. He has three children.

Goldacre was educated at Magdalen College School, Oxford. He studied medicine at the University of Oxford as a student of Magdalen College, Oxford, where he obtained a first-class Bachelor of Arts honours degree during his preclinical studies in 1995 in physiological sciences. He edited the Oxford student magazine, Isis.

Goldacre was a visiting researcher in cognitive neuroscience at the University of Milan, working on functional magnetic resonance imaging (fMRI) brain scans of language and executive function. Following his studies at the Universities of Oxford and Milan, Goldacre studied clinical medicine at UCL Medical School, qualifying as a medical doctor in 2000 with a Bachelor of Medicine, Bachelor of Surgery (MB, BS) degree. He also received a Master of Arts degree in philosophy from King's College London in 1997.

== Career and research ==
=== Scientific career ===
Goldacre passed the Member of the Royal College of Psychiatrists (MRCPsych) Part II examinations in December 2005 and became a member of the Royal College of Psychiatrists. He was made a research fellow at the Institute of Psychiatry in London in 2008, and a Guardian research fellow at Nuffield College, Oxford, in 2009.

In 2012, Goldacre was appointed a Wellcome Trust research fellow in Epidemiology at the London School of Hygiene & Tropical Medicine.

In 2015, Goldacre moved to the Nuffield Department of Primary Care Health Sciences's Centre for Evidence-Based Medicine at the University of Oxford with funding from the Laura and John Arnold Foundation. In 2022, he became the first Bennett Professor of Evidence-Based Medicine and director of Oxford's newly-established Bennett Institute for Applied Data Science.

As of 2016, according to Scopus and Google Scholar his most cited articles have been published in NeuroReport, the European Journal of Preventive Cardiology, the British Medical Journal, The Lancet, and PLOS ONE.

In 2020, Goldacre was, with Liam Smeeth, the principal investigator of the OpenSAFELY collaboration which created a software platform to analyse the records of 24 million NHS patients to provide detailed risk factors for hospital deaths from COVID-19.

=== "Bad Science" Guardian column and blog ===
Goldacre was known for his weekly column, "Bad Science", which ran in the Saturday edition of The Guardian from 2003 until November 2011. The column largely concerned pseudoscience and the misuse of science. Topics discussed included marketing, the media, quackery, problems with the pharmaceutical industry, and its relationship with medical journals.

Goldacre has criticised anti-immunisation campaigners (particularly followers of Andrew Wakefield such as Melanie Phillips and Jeni Barnett), Brain Gym, bogus positive MRSA swab stories in tabloid newspapers, publication bias, and the makers of the product Penta Water.

He has been a particularly harsh critic of the nutritionist Gillian McKeith. While investigating McKeith's membership of the American Association of Nutritional Consultants, Goldacre obtained a professional membership on behalf of his late cat, Henrietta, from the same institution for $60. In February 2007, McKeith agreed to stop using the title "Doctor" in her advertising, following a complaint to the Advertising Standards Authority by a "Bad Science" reader. In an interview with Richard Saunders of the podcast Skeptic Zone, Goldacre said, "Nutritionists are particularly toxic because they are the alternative therapists who, more than any other, misrepresent themselves as being men and women of science."

In 2008, Matthias Rath, a vitamin entrepreneur, sued Goldacre and The Guardian over three articles, in which Goldacre criticised Rath's promotion of vitamin pills to AIDS sufferers in South African townships. Rath dropped his action in September 2008 and was ordered to pay initial costs of £220,000 to The Guardian. As of September 2008, the paper was seeking full costs of £500,000, and Goldacre had expressed an interest in writing a book about Rath and South Africa, as a chapter on the subject had to be cut from his book while the litigation proceeded. The chapter was reinstated in a later edition of the book, and also published online in 2009. Goldacre continues to cite Rath as a proponent of harmful pseudoscience.

=== Andrew Wakefield ===
Although challenging Andrew Wakefield's views about immunisation, Goldacre defended Wakefield against an investigation by The Sunday Times into Wakefield's fraudulent 1998 paper in The Lancet, prompting criticism from the newspaper's reporter Brian Deer.

Writing in The Guardian in September 2005, Goldacre argued:

The paper always was and still remains a perfectly good small case series report, but it was systematically misrepresented as being more than that, by media that are incapable of interpreting and reporting scientific data.

After Wakefield's falsifications of the data came to light, Goldacre continued to lambast journalists for credulity and sensationalism:

Even if it had been immaculately well conducted - and it certainly wasn't – Wakefield's "case series report" of 12 children's clinical anecdotes would never have justified the conclusion that MMR causes autism, despite what journalists claimed: it simply didn't have big enough numbers to do so.

=== Bad Science (2008) ===
Goldacre's first book, Bad Science, was published by Fourth Estate in September 2008. The book contains extended and revised versions of many of his Guardian columns. It was positively reviewed by the British Medical Journal (BMJ) and The Daily Telegraph, and reached the Top 10 bestseller list for Amazon Books. It was nominated for the 2009 Samuel Johnson Prize. In an interview in 2008, Goldacre said that "one of the central themes" of his book [Bad Science] was "that there are no real differences between the $600 billion pharmaceutical industry and the $50 billion food supplement pill industry."

=== Bad Pharma (2012) ===
His second book, Bad Pharma: How Drug Companies Mislead Doctors and Harm Patients, was published in the UK in September 2012 and in the United States and Canada in February 2013. In the book he argues that:

Drugs are tested by the people who manufacture them, in poorly designed trials, on hopelessly small numbers of weird, unrepresentative patients, and analysed using techniques which are flawed by design, in such a way that they exaggerate the benefits of treatments. Unsurprisingly, these trials tend to produce results that favour the manufacturer. When trials throw up results that companies don't like, they are perfectly entitled to hide them from doctors and patients, so we only ever see a distorted picture of any drug's true effects. Regulators see most of the trial data, but only from early on in a drug's life, and even then they don't give this data to doctors or patients, or even to other parts of government. This distorted evidence is then communicated and applied in a distorted fashion. In their forty years of practice after leaving medical school, doctors hear about what works through ad hoc oral traditions, from sales reps, colleagues or journals. But those colleagues can be in the pay of drug companies – often undisclosed – and the journals are too. And so are the patient groups. And finally, academic papers, which everyone thinks of as objective, are often covertly planned and written by people who work directly for the companies, without disclosure.

=== Other journalism, writing and appearances ===
Goldacre contributed to The Atheist's Guide to Christmas (2009), a charity book featuring essays and anecdotes from 42 well-known atheists and apatheists, on the subject of "the power of ideas". He describes himself as an apatheist. He also wrote the foreword to a reissue of Testing Treatments: Better Research for Better Healthcare by Imogen Evans, Hazel Thornton, Iain Chalmers and Paul Glasziou, published by Pinter & Martin in March 2010. He has had several articles published in the British Medical Journal (BMJ) on the MMR vaccine, science journalism, and related topics.

In June 2012, he collaborated with the Behavioural Insights Team of the UK government on a policy paper on the use of randomised controlled trials, and in May 2013, he wrote the foreword to the 'Official Guidebook' of the Romney, Hythe and Dymchurch Railway. In March 2014, he worked on a systematic review of the side effects of statins compared with placebos, published in the European Journal of Preventive Cardiology. Although many newspapers that covered the review said that it found that statins have "virtually no side effects", Goldacre criticized this coverage as inaccurate. For example, he noted that the study relied on data from trial reports, which are likely to be incomplete.

Several of Goldacre's articles were assembled into the October 2014 release I Think You'll Find It's a Bit More Complicated Than That.

He was appointed Chair of the NHS HealthTech Advisory Board by Matt Hancock in September 2018.

Goldacre has also appeared on Geoff Marshall's YouTube channel expressing his love for railways during an episode about the least used station in Oxfordshire, Finstock.

== Awards and honours ==
Goldacre has won several awards including:

- Association of British Science Writers (ABSW) award for Best Feature 2003 for his article "Never mind the facts".
- Association of British Science Writers award for Best Feature 2005 for his article "Don't dumb me down".
- Freelance of 2006 at the Medical Journalism Awards.
- The Committee for Skeptical Inquiry (CSICOP) presented in 2006 the Balles Prize in Critical Thinking award for his column in The Guardian U.K. newspaper, Bad Science Columns include "Dyslexia 'cure' fails to pass the tests", "Bring me a God helmet, and bring it now", "Kick the habit with wacky wave energy", "Brain Gym exercises do pupils no favors" and "Magnetic attraction? Shhhh. It's a secret"
- The inaugural Statistical Excellence In Journalism Award of the Royal Statistical Society for his article "When the facts get in the way of a story".
- The Philosophy Now Award for Contributions in the Fight Against Stupidity (2012).
- The HealthWatch Award from HealthWatch.
- Honorary Doctor of Science at Heriot-Watt University (June 2009).
- Honorary Doctor of Science at Loughborough University (July 2010).
- Member of the Order of the British Empire "For services to Evidence in Policy" (New Year's Honours List 2018).

== Bibliography ==
- Bad Science. Fourth Estate, September 2008.
- Bad Pharma. Fourth Estate, September 2012.
- I Think You’ll Find It’s a Bit More Complicated Than That: A Witty and Provocative Science Non-Fiction Collection. Fourth Estate, October 2015.
