= Clinical data repository =

A Clinical Data Repository (CDR) or Clinical Data Warehouse (CDW) is a real time database that consolidates data from a variety of clinical sources to present a unified view of a single patient. It is optimized to allow clinicians to retrieve data for a single patient rather than to identify a population of patients with common characteristics or to facilitate the management of a specific clinical department. Typical data types which are often found within a CDR include: clinical laboratory test results, patient demographics, pharmacy information, radiology reports and images, pathology reports, hospital admission, discharge and transfer dates, ICD-9 codes, discharge summaries, and progress notes.

A Clinical Data Repository could be used in the hospital setting to track prescribing trends as well as for the monitoring of infectious diseases. One area CDR's could potentially be used is monitoring the prescribing of antibiotics in hospitals especially as the number of antibiotic-resistant bacteria is ever increasing. In 1995, a study at the Beth Israel Deaconess Medical Center conducted by the Harvard Medical School used a CDR to monitor vancomycin use and prescribing trends since vancomycin-resistant enterococci is a growing problem. They used the CDR to track the prescribing by linking the individual patient, medication, and the microbiology lab results which were all contained within the CDR. If the microbiology lab result did not support the use of vancomycin, it was suggested to change the medication to something appropriate as under the Center for Disease Control CDC guidelines. The use of CDR's could help monitor infectious diseases in the hospital and the appropriate prescribing based on lab results.

The use of Clinical Data Repositories could provide a wealth of knowledge about patients, their medical conditions, and their outcome. The database could serve as a way to study the relationship and potential patterns between disease progression and management. The term "Medical Data Mining" has been coined for this method of research. Past epidemiological studies may not have had as complete of information as that which is contained in a CDR, which could lead to inconclusive data/results. The use of medical data mining and correlative studies using the CDR could serve as a valuable resource helping the future of healthcare in all facets of medicine. The idea of data mining a CDW was used for screening variables that were associated with diabetes and poor glycemic control. It allowed for novel correlations that may have not been discovered without this method.

One potential use of a clinical data repository would be for clinical trials. This would allow for researchers to have all the information from a study in one place as well as let other researchers benefit from the data to further innovation. They would also be advantageous since they are digital and real-time. This would be easier to log data and keep it accurate since it would be digital rather than in paper form.

The clinical data repository is not without its weaknesses, however. Since they usually don't integrate with other non-clinical sources, following patient treatment across the care continuum becomes very difficult. In turn, tracking the true cost per case for each patient isn't feasible. IT teams spend most of their time gathering and compiling data instead of interpreting information and finding opportunities for cutting costs and improving patient care.
