= Centre for Evidence-Based Medicine =

Centre at the University of Oxford, UK

- Type: Public
- Established: 1995
- Parent institution: University of Oxford
- Director: Carl Heneghan
- Faculty: 25
- Students: 5 full-time DPhils, 28 part-time DPhils and 75 MSc students
- Location: Oxford, England
- Website: www.cebm.ox.ac.uk

The Centre for Evidence-Based Medicine (CEBM) is an academic research centre with a strong international reputation, situated within the Nuffield Department of Primary Care Health Sciences at the Medical Sciences Division at the University of Oxford in the UK. It focuses on the practice, teaching, and dissemination of high quality research in evidence-based medicine to improve healthcare in everyday clinical practice.

CEBM was founded by David Sackett in 1995. It was subsequently directed by Brian Haynes and Paul Glasziou. Since 2010 it has been led by Professor Carl Heneghan, a clinical epidemiologist and academic general practitioner.

There are currently over 25 active staff and honorary members of the CEBM. The staff include clinicians, statisticians, epidemiologists, information specialists, and quantitative and qualitative researchers.

== Teaching and degrees ==
CEBM is the academic lead for Oxford University's Medical School in Evidence-Based Healthcare, together with the University's Department of Continuing Education. The Centre runs an MSc course in Evidence-Based Health Care and a DPhil programme in Evidence-Based Health Care, along with a range of short courses, including a course on the History and Philosophy of Evidence-Based Healthcare which was developed by Jeremy Howick and Iain Chalmers. Preclinical and clinical medical students are also offered opportunities to conduct publishable systematic reviews of research topics of their choosing, as part of their training.

== EBM Live conference ==
Every year, CEBM organizes EBM Live (previously Evidence Live), a multi-day conference focussing on developments in the area of evidence-based medicine. The conference is run in collaboration with the British Medical Journal. Themes for the conference include Improving the Quality of Research; disentangling the Problems of Too Much and Too Little Healthcare; transforming the Communication of Evidence for Better Health; training the Next Generation of Leaders and translating Evidence into Better-Quality Health Services.

== Notable projects ==
=== The Catalogue of Bias ===
Led by David Nunan, the CEBM has developed an online catalogue in which different types of biases that can affect research are discussed in individual monographs dealing with each bias separately. The caalogue includes over 70 different types of biases and continues to grow.

=== The Oxford COVID-19 Evidence Service ===
During the covid-19 pandemic the Centre instituted the Oxford COVID-19 Evidence Service, to produce rapid reviews in response to questions from healthcare professionals and policy makers at the front line of the pandemic. The service was selected by the Bodleian Library for archiving in April 2020.

=== Levels of evidence ===
The CEBM has developed a widely adopted systematic hierarchy of the quality of medical research evidence, named the levels of evidence. Systematic reviews of randomised clinical trials (encompassing homogeneity) are seen as the highest possible level of evidence, as full assessment and aggregated synthesis of underlying evidence is possible.

=== Tamiflu (oseltamivir) ===
In collaboration with the British Medical Journal, Carl Heneghan and team found no evidence that Tamiflu helped to reduce complications of influenza. This has become a controversial topic, as the United Kingdom government spend £473 million (as of 2014) on purchasing Tamiflu, despite the systematic review claiming to find no evidence of effectiveness.

=== Sports products ===
A systematic review conducted in 2012 showed very little effect of carbohydrate drinks on sport performance of the general population. This work formed part of a joint investigation with BBC Panorama and the British Medical Journal. A linked article published in the BMJ reported a "striking lack of evidence" to back up claims for popular sports brands. A further analysis of a broad range of sports products showed that the evidence for many sports products is poor quality and insufficient to inform the public about the benefits and harms of the products.

=== Self care ===
Systematic review and individual patient data meta analysis research in the centre has shown that, even with little training, people on oral anticoagulation (warfarin) can successfully self-monitor, and even self-manage their disease in the community. Patients capable of self-monitoring and self-adjusting therapy have fewer thromboembolic events and lower mortality than those who self-monitor alone. In 2014, Carl Heneghan along with Alison Ward became directors of a World Health Organization Collaborating Centre for self-care in non-communicable disease.

=== AllTrials ===
The centre is one of the co-founders of the AllTrials campaign, which has been influential in ensuring that the results of all clinical trials are registered and reported in full.

=== Diagnostic technologies and reasoning ===
The centre has a strong diagnostic focus, which includes assessing novel diagnostic technologies relevant to improving the diagnosis of disease in primary care and also to improving diagnostic reasoning. In 2015, the centre produced a report for the Department of Health on antimicrobial resistance diagnostics, which highlighted the considerable number of new diagnostic technologies in development to underpin rational prescribing of antibiotics.

=== COMPare project ===
In 2015 the COMPare project was launched, addressing outcome switching in clinical trials. The project systematically checks every trial published in the top five medical journals, to see if they have misreported their findings, comparing each clinical trial report against its registry entry. The project has found that some trials report their outcomes perfectly, but for many others outcomes specified in the registry entry were never reported. The updates to the trials are updated live on the COMPare website. The project highlights how researchers are duped by the common practice in clinical trial reporting of "outcome switching".

=== Adverse events ===
Dr Jeffrey Aronson, a physician and clinical pharmacologist and an internationally recognized expert in pharmacovigilance, is a member of the CEBM. In March 2016, research at the centre systematically identified 462 medicinal products that had been withdrawn worldwide because of adverse drug reactions, although only 40 were withdrawn worldwide. Withdrawal was significantly less likely in Africa than in other continents. Furthermore, of the 95 drugs for which death was documented as a reason for withdrawal, more than two years elapsed between the first report of a death and withdrawal of the drug in 47% of cases.

== Notable associates ==
Notable associates of the centre include:

- Professor Ben Goldacre
- Sir Iain Chalmers
- Dr Margaret McCartney
- Professor Sir Muir Gray
- Professor Rod Jackson University of Auckland
