= Deadly Medicines and Organised Crime =

2013 book by Peter C. Gøtzsche

Deadly Medicines and Organised Crime: How Big Pharma Has Corrupted Healthcare
- Author: Peter C. Gøtzsche
- Language: English
- Genre: Non-fiction
- Published: 2013 (Taylor & Francis group)
- Publication place: United Kingdom
- Media type: Print, Paperback
- ISBN: 9781846198847

Deadly Medicines and Organised Crime: How Big Pharma Has Corrupted Healthcare is a book by Peter C. Gøtzsche with forewords by Richard Smith and Drummond Rennie. It was published by Taylor & Francis in 2013.

The book says that activities by major pharmaceutical companies include corruption, fraud, bribery, and omission of data to market their products. While all drugs have side effects not all have benefits, the influx of money by pharma undercuts regulation, education, and scientific integrity. Gøtzsche makes proposals on how to improve the situation.

== Reviews ==
According to Farhat Yaqub, Gøtzsche is an outspoken and knowledgeable critic who wrote the book to “influence policy towards much more transparency”. He also indicates that he published a book as it was difficult to publish his criticism in medical journals. Andrew Haynes finds his criticism caustic. Justin B. Biddle indicates that while most of the material has been covered before, Gøtzsche adds a wealth of detail. Tom Yates who agrees with the author on many fundamental points finds the book could have been better. He indicates that there is too much hyperbole "and, in places, (it is) a little offensive". James Dickinson writes that the book is comprehensive and the "barrage of evidence is overwhelming". Better editing with a more careful attention to writing and referencing would have improved the book.

== Awards ==
Recipient of 2014 BMA Medical Book Awards, Basis of Medicine
