= FMD =

FMD may refer to:

== Biology and medicine ==
- Fibromuscular dysplasia, a medical condition
- Fig mosaic disease, a viral disease of fig plants
- Foot-and-mouth disease, a viral disease of ungulates
- Flow-mediated dilation, a physiological response, and medically diagnostic tool
- Fasting mimicking diet is a diet that aims to achieve the benefits of fasting

== Other ==
- Falsified Medicines Directive, a European legal framework
- Fashion Model Directory, an online database
- Fluorescent Multilayer Disc, a disc format
- Fort Madison station (disambiguation), Iowa, United States
- Fyodor Mikhailovich Dostoyevsky, a Russian writer (1821–1881)
