= Drug trade =

Drug trade may refer to:

- Legal drug trade, the manufacture and sale of pharmaceutical drugs
- Illegal drug trade, the manufacture and sale of illicit psychoactive substances
- Pharmaceutical industry, the manufacture and sale of medical treatment chemicals
- Drug distribution, the logistics of delivering drugs from the manufacturer to the consumer

== See also ==
- Legality of drugs (disambiguation)
