= Lists of pharmaceutical industry topics =

These are Wikipedia lists about the pharmaceutical industry. The pharmaceutical industry develops, produces, and markets drugs or pharmaceuticals licensed for use as medications. Pharmaceutical companies are allowed to deal in generic or brand medications and medical devices. They are subject to a variety of laws and regulations regarding the production, testing, and marketing of drugs.

- List of pharmaceutical companies
- List of largest selling pharmaceutical products
- List of largest pharmaceutical settlements
- List of off-label promotion pharmaceutical settlements
- List of pharmaceutical sciences journals
- List of pharmaceutical compound number prefixes
- List of pharmaceutical manufacturers in the United Kingdom
- List of pharmaceutical companies in Hyderabad
- List of pharmaceutical companies in China
- List of GlaxoSmithKline products

== See also ==
- Ethics in pharmaceutical sales
- European Medicines Agency
- Food and Drug Administration
- Medicines and Healthcare products Regulatory Agency
- Pharmaceutical marketing
