= C15H13NO3 =

The molecular formula C_{15}H_{13}NO_{3} (molar mass: 255.27 g/mol) may refer to:

- Amfenac, also known as 2-amino-3-benzoylbenzeneacetic acid
- Dinoxyline
- Ketorolac
- Polyfothine
- Pranoprofen
