= Pharmaceutical lobby =

Lobbying group

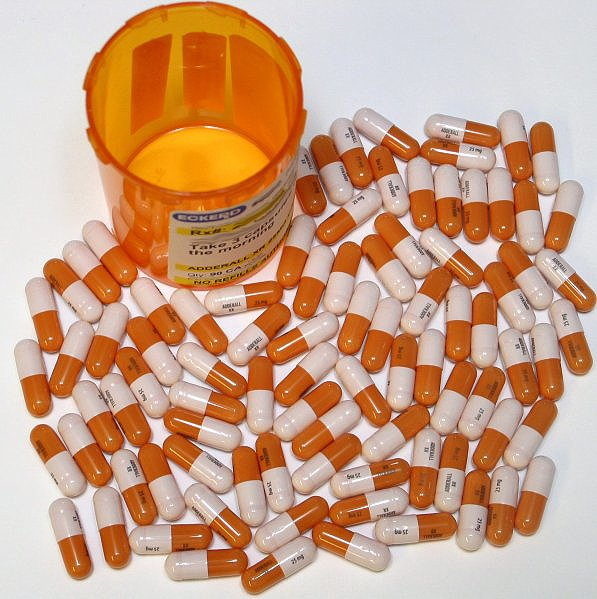
Adderall XR pills

The pharmaceutical lobby refers to the representatives of pharmaceutical drug and biomedicine companies who engage in lobbying in favour of pharmaceutical companies and their products.

Lobbying takes place at national and international levels, including institutions such as the United States Congress, the European Parliament, and the World Health Organization. Large companies such as Pfizer, Novartis, and Roche lobby directly or through trade groups like Pharmaceutical Research and Manufacturers of America (PhRMA) and the European Federation of Pharmaceutical Industries and Associations (EFPIA).

Common methods include meetings with policymakers, public campaigns, political donations, and litigation to challenge regulations or protect patents. Critics argue this influence contributes to high drug prices and conflicts of interest, while supporters say it can support innovation and access to new medicines. The role of pharmaceutical companies in shaping international agreements and national policies remains a subject of academic and political discussion.

== Lobbying by country or region ==
=== United States ===
The largest pharmaceutical companies and their two trade groups, Pharmaceutical Research and Manufacturers of America (PhRMA) and Biotechnology Innovation Organization, lobbied on at least 1,600 pieces of legislation between 1998 and 2004. According to the non-partisan OpenSecrets, pharmaceutical companies spent $900 million on lobbying between 1998 and 2005, more than any other industry. During the same period, they donated $89.9 million to federal candidates and political parties, giving approximately three times as much to Republicans as to Democrats. According to the Center for Public Integrity, from January 2005 through June 2006 alone, the pharmaceutical industry spent approximately $182 million on federal lobbying in the United States. In 2005, the industry had 1,274 registered lobbyists in Washington, D.C.

A 2020 study found that, from 1999 to 2018, the pharmaceutical industry and health product industry together spent $4.7 billion lobbying the United States federal government, an average of $233 million per year.

==== Prescription drug costs in the U.S. ====
Critics of the pharmaceutical lobby argue that the drug industry's influence allows it to promote legislation friendly to drug manufacturers at the expense of patients. The lobby's influence in securing the passage of the Medicare Prescription Drug, Improvement, and Modernization Act of 2003 was considered a major and controversial victory for the industry, as it prevents the government from directly negotiating prices with drug companies who provide those prescription drugs covered by Medicare. Price negotiations are instead conducted between manufacturers and the pharmacy benefit managers providing Medicare Part D benefits under contract with Medicare. In 2010 the Congressional Budget Office estimated the average discount negotiated by pharmacy benefit managers at 14%.

The high price of U.S. prescription drugs has been a source of ongoing controversy. Pharmaceutical companies state that the high costs are the result of pricey research and development programs. Critics point to the development of drugs having only small incremental benefit. According to Marcia Angell, former editor-in-chief of the New England Journal of Medicine, "The United States is the only advanced country that permits the pharmaceutical industry to charge exactly what the market will bear." In contrast, the RAND Corporation and authors from the National Bureau of Economic Research have argued that price controls stifle innovation and are economically counterproductive in the long term.

== COVID-19 patent waiver debate ==
In 2021, during the height of COVID-19, vaccine makers increased lobbying and public-relations efforts to oppose a proposal that would temporarily waive their patents in Germany, Japan and other countries. This proposal would allow COVID-19 vaccine patents to be licensed to international vaccine makers or otherwise sold entirely. The Biden presidential administration in the U.S. supported the waiver proposal. Pharmaceutical industry trade groups supported actors in Germany, Japan, and other countries that expressed opposition. Pharmaceutical industry representatives lobbied members of Congress and the Biden administration to reverse its support of the waiver, arguing that the patents protect its innovations. However, proponents of the proposal saw the patent as giving companies a monopoly over sales of vaccines during a world crisis.

== See also ==
- Bad Pharma (2012) by Ben Goldacre
- Big Pharma (2006) by Jacky Law
- Big Pharma conspiracy theory
- Ethics in pharmaceutical sales
- List of pharmaceutical companies
- Lists about the pharmaceutical industry
- Pharmaceutical marketing
