= Annual pharmaceutical drug sales =

This is a list of annual sales of patented medications per pharmaceutical group. Because it derives from 10-K data, drugs that have passed loss of exclusivity (LOE) will cease to be on this list.

== Annual Sales (2020-present) ==
Medication	Trade name	Primary Indication	Company	2024	2023	2022	2021	2020
atorvastatin	Lipitor	Reduction of LDL cholesterol	Pfizer					
sunitinib malate	Sutent	Advanced and/or metastatic renal cell carcinoma (mRCC) & refractory gastrointestinal stromal tumors (GIST)	Pfizer					
irinotecan	Camptosar	Metastatic colorectal cancer	Pfizer					
bimatoprost	Lumigan	Open-angle glaucoma or ocular hypertension	Allergan					
exemestane	Aromasin	Breast cancer	Pfizer					
epirubicin	Ellence	Breast cancer	Pfizer					
trastuzumab	Herceptin	HER2-positive metastatic breast cancer	Genentech					
gemcitabine	Gemzar	Ovarian cancer, non-small cell lung cancer (NSCLC), metastatic breast cancer (MBC), and pancreatic cancer	Eli Lilly & Co.					
bevacizumab	Avastin	Metastatic colorectal cancer, non-small cell lung cancer (NSCLC), renal cell carcinoma, HER2-negative breast cancer	Genentech					
erlotinib	Tarceva	Advanced (metastatic) non-small cell lung cancer (NSCLC)	Genentech					
brimonidine	Alphagan	Open-angle glaucoma or ocular hypertension	Allergan					
rituximab	Rituxan	Non-Hodgkin's lymphoma and rheumatoid arthritis	Genentech					
ranibizumab	Lucentis	Age-related macular degeneration (AMD)	Genentech					
omalizumab	Xolair	Asthma	Genentech					
somatropin	Nutropin	Growth hormone deficiency, chronic kidney disease	Genentech					
dornase alfa	Pulmozyme	Cystic fibrosis (CF)	Genentech					
efalizumab	Raptiva	Plaque psoriasis	Genentech					
montelukast	Singulair	Asthma	Merck					
alendronate sodium	Fosamax	Postmenopausal osteoporosis	Merck					
sitagliptin	Januvia	Type 2 diabetes	Merck					
simvastatin	Zocor	Reduction of LDL cholesterol	Merck					
rizatriptan benzoate	Maxalt	Migraine pain	Merck					
finasteride	Propecia	Hair loss	Merck					
etoricoxib	Arcoxia	Osteoarthritis and rheumatoid arthritis	Merck					
sitagliptin/metformin HCl	Janumet	Type 2 diabetes	Merck					
finasteride	Proscar	Benign prostatic hyperplasia (enlarged prostate)	Merck					
aprepitant	Emend	Nausea and vomiting prevention caused by chemotherapy	Merck					
olanzapine	Zyprexa	Schizophrenia	Eli Lilly & Co.					
duloxetine HCl	Cymbalta	Depression and generalized anxiety disorder	Eli Lilly & Co.					
insulin lispro	Humalog	Type 1 diabetes in adults	Eli Lilly & Co.					
pemetrexed	Alimta	Locally advanced or metastatic nonsquamous non-small cell lung cancer (NSCLC)	Eli Lilly & Co.					
raloxifene HCl	Evista	Osteoporosis	Eli Lilly & Co.					
insulin isophane	Humulin	Diabetes	Eli Lilly & Co.					
teriparatide	Forteo	Osteoporosis	Eli Lilly & Co.					
atomoxetine HCl	Strattera	Attention-deficit/hyperactivity disorder (ADHD)	Eli Lilly & Co.					
timolol	Istalol	Open-angle glaucoma	Ista Pharmaceutical					
bromfenac	Xibrom	Ocular inflammation	Ista Pharmaceutical					
hyaluronidase	Vitrase	Spreading agent	Ista Pharmaceutica					
rivaroxaban	Xarelto	Deep vein thrombosis	Johnson & Johnson					

== Annual Sales (2010-2020) ==
Medication	Trade name	Primary Indication	Company											
atorvastatin	Lipitor	Reduction of LDL cholesterol	Pfizer	2020	2019	2018	2017	2016	2015	2014	2013	2012	2011	2010
sunitinib malate	Sutent	Advanced and/or metastatic renal cell carcinoma (mRCC) & refractory gastrointestinal stromal tumors (GIST)	Pfizer											
irinotecan	Camptosar	Metastatic colorectal cancer	Pfizer											
bimatoprost	Lumigan	Open-angle glaucoma or ocular hypertension	Allergan											
exemestane	Aromasin	Breast cancer	Pfizer											
epirubicin	Ellence	Breast cancer	Pfizer											
trastuzumab	Herceptin	HER2-positive metastatic breast cancer	Genentech											
gemcitabine	Gemzar	Ovarian cancer, non-small cell lung cancer (NSCLC), metastatic breast cancer (MBC), and pancreatic cancer	Eli Lilly & Co.											
bevacizumab	Avastin	Metastatic colorectal cancer, non-small cell lung cancer (NSCLC), renal cell carcinoma, HER2-negative breast cancer	Genentech											
erlotinib	Tarceva	Advanced (metastatic) non-small cell lung cancer (NSCLC)	Genentech											
brimonidine	Alphagan	Open-angle glaucoma or ocular hypertension	Allergan											
rituximab	Rituxan	Non-Hodgkin's lymphoma and rheumatoid arthritis	Genentech											
ranibizumab	Lucentis	Age-related macular degeneration (AMD)	Genentech											
omalizumab	Xolair	Asthma	Genentech											
somatropin	Nutropin	Growth hormone deficiency, chronic kidney disease	Genentech											
dornase alfa	Pulmozyme	Cystic fibrosis (CF)	Genentech											
efalizumab	Raptiva	Plaque psoriasis	Genentech											
montelukast	Singulair	Asthma	Merck											
alendronate sodium	Fosamax	Postmenopausal osteoporosis	Merck											
sitagliptin	Januvia	Type 2 diabetes	Merck											
simvastatin	Zocor	Reduction of LDL cholesterol	Merck											
rizatriptan benzoate	Maxalt	Migraine pain	Merck											
finasteride	Propecia	Hair loss	Merck											
etoricoxib	Arcoxia	Osteoarthritis and rheumatoid arthritis	Merck											
sitagliptin/metformin HCl	Janumet	Type 2 diabetes	Merck											
finasteride	Proscar	Benign prostatic hyperplasia (enlarged prostate)	Merck											
aprepitant	Emend	Nausea and vomiting prevention caused by chemotherapy	Merck											
olanzapine	Zyprexa	Schizophrenia	Eli Lilly & Co.											
duloxetine HCl	Cymbalta	Depression and generalized anxiety disorder	Eli Lilly & Co.											
insulin lispro	Humalog	Type 1 diabetes in adults	Eli Lilly & Co.											
pemetrexed	Alimta	Locally advanced or metastatic nonsquamous non-small cell lung cancer (NSCLC)	Eli Lilly & Co.											
raloxifene HCl	Evista	Osteoporosis	Eli Lilly & Co.											
insulin isophane	Humulin	Diabetes	Eli Lilly & Co.											
teriparatide	Forteo	Osteoporosis	Eli Lilly & Co.											
atomoxetine HCl	Strattera	Attention-deficit/hyperactivity disorder (ADHD)	Eli Lilly & Co.											
timolol	Istalol	Open-angle glaucoma	Ista Pharmaceutical											
bromfenac	Xibrom	Ocular inflammation	Ista Pharmaceutical											
hyaluronidase	Vitrase	Spreading agent	Ista Pharmaceutica											
rivaroxaban	Xarelto	Deep vein thrombosis	Johnson & Johnson											

== Annual Sales (2000-2010) ==
Medication	Trade name	Primary Indication	Company	2010	2009	2008	2007	2006	2005	2004	2003	2002	2001	2000
atorvastatin	Lipitor	Reduction of LDL cholesterol	Pfizer			$12,401	$12,675	$12,886	$12,187	$10,862	$9,231	$7,972	$6,448	$5,028
sunitinib malate	Sutent	Advanced and/or metastatic renal cell carcinoma (mRCC) & refractory gastrointestinal stromal tumors (GIST)	Pfizer			$847	$581	$219						
irinotecan	Camptosar	Metastatic colorectal cancer	Pfizer			$563	$969	$903	$910	$554	$299			
bimatoprost	Lumigan	Open-angle glaucoma or ocular hypertension	Allergan			$426.2	$391.7	$327.5	$267.6	$232.9	$181.3	$123	$35.4	
exemestane	Aromasin	Breast cancer	Pfizer			$465	$401	$320	$247	$143	$58			
epirubicin	Ellence	Breast cancer	Pfizer					$312	$367	$344	$216			
trastuzumab	Herceptin	HER2-positive metastatic breast cancer	Genentech			$1,382	$1,287	$1,234	$747.2	$483.2	$424.8	$385.2	$346.7	$276
gemcitabine	Gemzar	Ovarian cancer, non-small cell lung cancer (NSCLC), metastatic breast cancer (MBC), and pancreatic cancer	Eli Lilly & Co.			$1,719.8	$1,592.4	$1,408.1	$1,334.5	$1,214.4	$1,021.7	$875	$723	$559.3
bevacizumab	Avastin	Metastatic colorectal cancer, non-small cell lung cancer (NSCLC), renal cell carcinoma, HER2-negative breast cancer	Genentech			$2,686	$2,296	$1,746	$1,132	$554.6				
erlotinib	Tarceva	Advanced (metastatic) non-small cell lung cancer (NSCLC)	Genentech			$457	$417	$402	$274.9	$13.3				
brimonidine	Alphagan	Open-angle glaucoma or ocular hypertension	Allergan								$286.8	$248.5	$250.9	
rituximab	Rituxan	Non-Hodgkin's lymphoma and rheumatoid arthritis	Genentech			$2,587	$2,285	$2,071	$1,831.4	$1,574	$1,360.2	$1,162.9	$818.6	
ranibizumab	Lucentis	Age-related macular degeneration (AMD)	Genentech			$875	$815	$380						
omalizumab	Xolair	Asthma	Genentech			$517	$472	$425	$320.6	$187.6	$25.1			
somatropin	Nutropin	Growth hormone deficiency, chronic kidney disease	Genentech			$358	$371	$378	$370.5	$348.8	$319.5			
dornase alfa	Pulmozyme	Cystic fibrosis (CF)	Genentech			$257	$223	$199	$186.5	$157.1	$143.7	$138.1	$123	
efalizumab	Raptiva	Plaque psoriasis	Genentech			$108	$107	$90	$79.2	$52.4	$1.4			
montelukast	Singulair	Asthma	Merck			$4,336.9	$4,266.3	$3,579	$2,975.6	$2,622				
alendronate sodium	Fosamax	Postmenopausal osteoporosis	Merck			$1,552.7	$3,049	$3,134.4	$3,191.2	$3,159.7				
sitagliptin	Januvia	Type 2 diabetes	Merck			$1,397.1	$667.5	$42.9						
simvastatin	Zocor	Reduction of LDL cholesterol	Merck			$660.1	$876.5	$2,802.7	$4,381.7	$5,196.5				
rizatriptan benzoate	Maxalt	Migraine pain	Merck			$529.2	$467.3	$406.4	$348.4	$309.9				
finasteride	Propecia	Hair loss	Merck			$429.1	$405.4	$351.8	$291.9	$270.2				
etoricoxib	Arcoxia	Osteoarthritis and rheumatoid arthritis	Merck			$377.3	$329.1	$265.4	$218.2					
sitagliptin/metformin HCl	Janumet	Type 2 diabetes	Merck			$351.1	$86.4							
finasteride	Proscar	Benign prostatic hyperplasia (enlarged prostate)	Merck			$323.5	$411	$618.5	$741.4	$733.1				
aprepitant	Emend	Nausea and vomiting prevention caused by chemotherapy	Merck			$263.8	$204.2	$130.8	$87					
olanzapine	Zyprexa	Schizophrenia	Eli Lilly & Co.			$4,696.1	$4,761	$4,363.6	$4,202.3	$4,419.8	$4,276.9	$3,689	$3,087	$2,349.5
duloxetine HCl	Cymbalta	Depression and generalized anxiety disorder	Eli Lilly & Co.			$2,697.1	$2,102.9	$1,316.4	$679.7	$93.9				
insulin lispro	Humalog	Type 1 diabetes in adults	Eli Lilly & Co.			$1,735.8	$1,474.6	$1,299.5	$1,197.7	$1,101.6	$1,021.3	$834	$628	$350.2
pemetrexed	Alimta	Locally advanced or metastatic nonsquamous non-small cell lung cancer (NSCLC)	Eli Lilly & Co.			$1,154.7	$854	$611.8	$463.2	$142.6				
raloxifene HCl	Evista	Osteoporosis	Eli Lilly & Co.			$1,075.6	$1,090.7	$1,045.3	$1,036.1	$1,012.7	$922.1	$822	$665	$521.5
insulin isophane	Humulin	Diabetes	Eli Lilly & Co.			$1,063.2	$985.2	$925.3	$1,004.7	$997.7	$1,060.4	$1,004	$1,061	$1,114.5
teriparatide	Forteo	Osteoporosis	Eli Lilly & Co.			$778.7	$709.3	$594.3	$389.3	$238.6	$65.3			
atomoxetine HCl	Strattera	Attention-deficit/hyperactivity disorder (ADHD)	Eli Lilly & Co.			$579.5	$569.4	$579	$552.1	$666.7	$370.3			
timolol	Istalol	Open-angle glaucoma	Ista Pharmaceutical			$14.6	$11.3	$8.3	$2.6					
bromfenac	Xibrom	Ocular inflammation	Ista Pharmaceutical			$63	$42.1	$20.2	$5.3					
hyaluronidase	Vitrase	Spreading agent	Ista Pharmaceutica			$5.2	$5.2	$4.2	$2.5					
rivaroxaban	Xarelto	Deep vein thrombosis	Johnson & Johnson	$1,868	$1,522	$864	$239	$25						
