= C21H25ClN2O3 =

The molecular formula C_{21}H_{25}ClN_{2}O_{3} (molar mass: 388.89 g/mol) may refer to:

- Bepotastine
- Cetirizine (brand name Zyrtec)
- Levocetirizine (brand name Xyzal)
