= European Medicines Verification Organisation =

The European Medicines Verification Organisation was established by the European Commission to administer the Falsified Medicines Directive in 2015. The legal basis is Regulation (EC) No. 726/2004 and Directive 2001/83/EC.

The main stakeholders are:

- European Federation of Pharmaceutical Industries and Associations
- Medicines for Europe
- European Association of Euro-Pharmaceutical Companies
- European Healthcare Distribution Association
- Pharmaceutical Group of the European Union
- European Association of Hospital Pharmacists
- European Hospital and Healthcare Federation

All prescription medicines must have a unique identifier, which is embedded in a two-dimensional Data Matrix code and packaging must have a tamper verification feature. The organisation maintains a database of unique identifiers supplied pharmaceutical suppliers in respect of each unit of sale package they manufacture or repackage. It contains:

- Product code
- Randomised serial number
- Expiration date
- Batch or lot number
- National Health Reimbursement Number if required

In August 2018 the organisation warned that only 841 of the 2,291 pharmaceutical companies with marketing authorisations to supply prescription medicines to the European Economic Area had completed the first stage of connection to the EU Hub, which may take up to six months.

The system went live on 9 February 2019.
