= Pharmaceutical distribution =

Logistical practice of supplying medicine to concerned populations

The distribution of medications has special drug safety and security considerations. Some drugs require cold chain management in their distribution.

The industry uses track and trace technology, though the timings for implementation and the information required vary across different countries, with varying laws and standards.

== Regulation ==
Because governments regulate access to drugs, governments control drug distribution and the drug supply chain more than trade for other goods. Distribution begins with the pharmaceutical industry manufacturing drugs. From there, intermediaries in the public sector, private sector, and non-governmental organizations acquire drugs to provide them to other intermediaries. Eventually, the drugs reach different classes of consumers who use them.

Good distribution practice (GDP) is an integrated system of procedures, standards and practices aimed at ensuring product quality at all stages of the supply chain, which includes requirements for purchase, receiving, storage, transportation and export of drugs intended for human consumption. It regulates the division and movement of pharmaceutical products from the premises of the manufacturer of medicinal products, or another central point, to the end user (usually defined as the medical facility or pharmacy that uses the product on or issues it to patients, or the retail outlet that sells to customers) thereof, or to an intermediate point by means of various transport methods, via various storage and/or health establishments.

=== Argentina ===
In 2011, Argentina introduced a catalogue of drugs covered by its national drug traceability scheme, listing more than 3,000 drugs that require the placing of unique serial numbers and tamper-evident features on the secondary packaging. The drugs listed are recorded in real time in a central database managed by the National Administration of Drugs, Foods, Medical Devices of Argentina (ANMAT), Regulation 3683, which uses Global Location Numbers (GLNs) to identify the various actors in the supply chain. The purpose of this program is to actively limit the use of illegal drugs.

=== Brazil ===
The 2009 Brazilian Federal Law 11.903 and subsequent regulations of the National Agency for Sanitary Surveillance in Brazil (ANVISA) require that a 2D data matrix code be put on all secondary packaging. Under these provisions, manufacturers will be required to maintain a database of all transactions from manufacturing to dispensing, while distributors must report serialized transaction data to the manufacturer and keep a database of suppliers, medicine recipients, and packing companies.

Data Element – National Number, Expiration Date, Batch/Lot Number, Serial Number

=== China ===
In 2008, China’s State Food and Drug Administration (CFDA) made serialization mandatory for over 275 therapeutic classes of individual saleable product units by December 2015. The CFDA does not follow an international standard. Manufacturers may only register their products and obtain their serial numbers by applying to the China Product Identification, Authentication and Tracking System (PIATS). They must also implement a quality control system with an electronic drug-monitoring system, a standardized documentation system, and bar codes to ensure pharmaceutical traceability. Companies importing drugs into China must designate a local pharmaceutical company or wholesaler as their electronic monitoring agent in the country. In addition to legislative reforms, China has increased enforcement efforts at the provincial and local levels. In 2013, the Chinese government coordinated joint special enforcement campaigns targeting counterfeit drugs. China regulations are currently on hold.

=== Europe ===
In Europe GDP is based on the Commission Directive (EU) 2017/1572 of 15 September 2017 supplementing Directive 2001/83/EC of the European Parliament and of the Council as regards the principles and guidelines of good manufacturing practice for medicinal products for human use.

In 2016, the European Medicines Agency adopted the Falsified Medicines Directive (FMD), which requires all pharmaceutical products sold in the EU to feature obligatory “safety features.” This directive is scheduled to launch in the first quarter of 2019. By February 9, 2019, all pharmaceutical companies will be required to connect their internal systems to the EU data repository, which contains the product master data and batch information. This will allow pharmacists and consumers to authenticate their medicines.

=== United States ===
In the US, Good Manufacturing Practice (GMP) Regulations are based on the Code of Federal Regulations 21 CFR 210/211, and USP 1079.

The US Drug Supply and Chain Security Act (DSCSA), was enacted by Congress on November 26, 2013 and outlines requirements to build electronic systems that identify and trace prescription drugs distributed in the US. By November 27th 2023, full electronic track & trace capability will be required for all partners in the supply chain.

== Illegal drugs ==
An illegal drug trade operates to distribute illegal drugs. The trade of illegal drugs overlaps with trade in contraband of all sorts. Illegal drug distribution does not overlap in obvious ways with the legal trade of legal drugs.

== See also ==
- Cold chain
- Contamination control
- Counterfeit medications
- European Medicines Agency (EMA)
- Good manufacturing practice
- GxP
- Packaging and labeling
- Prescription Drug Marketing Act (PDMA) of the USA
- Package testing
- Site Master File
- Validation (drug manufacture)

== Gallery ==
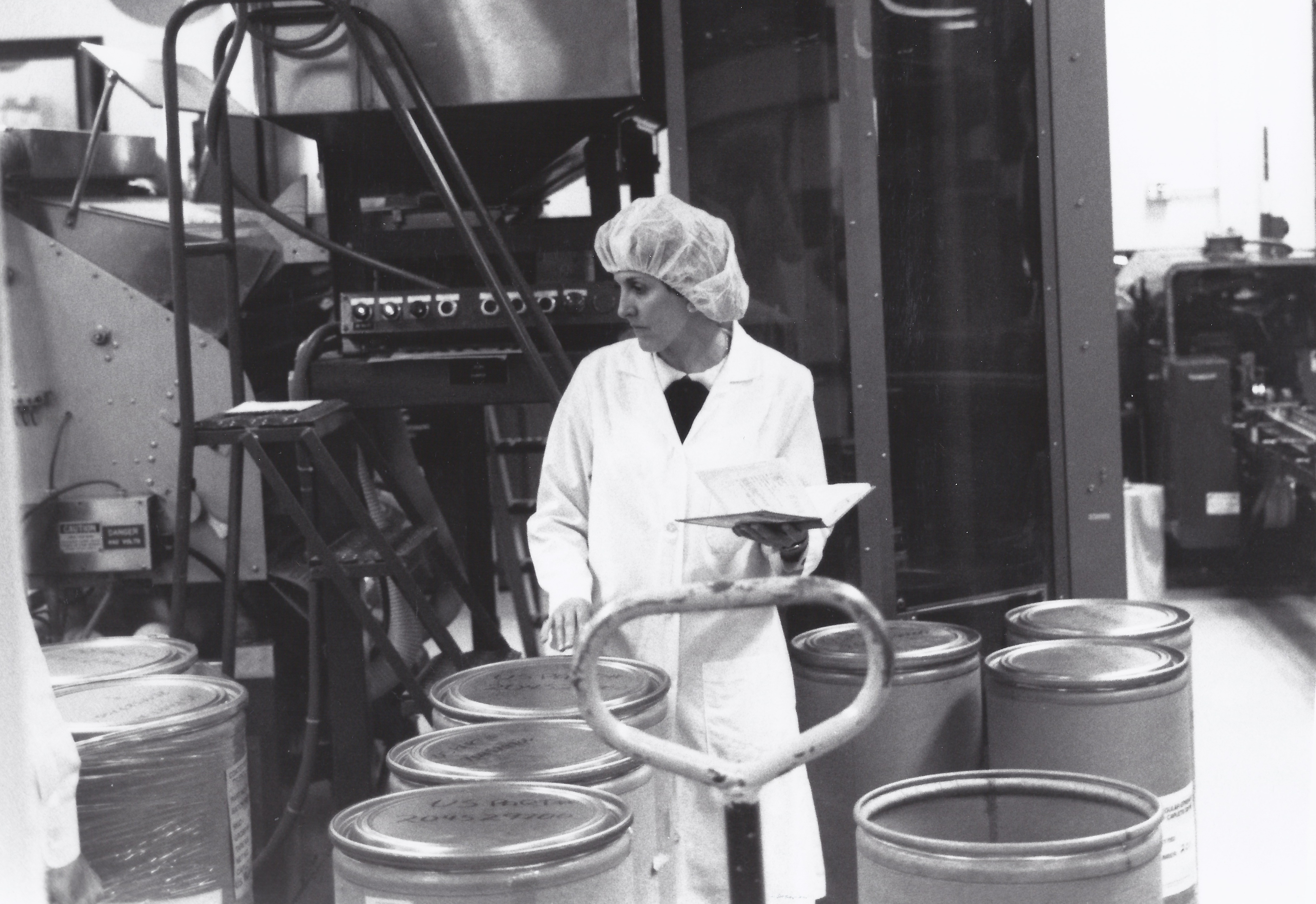
Bulk drugs in fiber drums

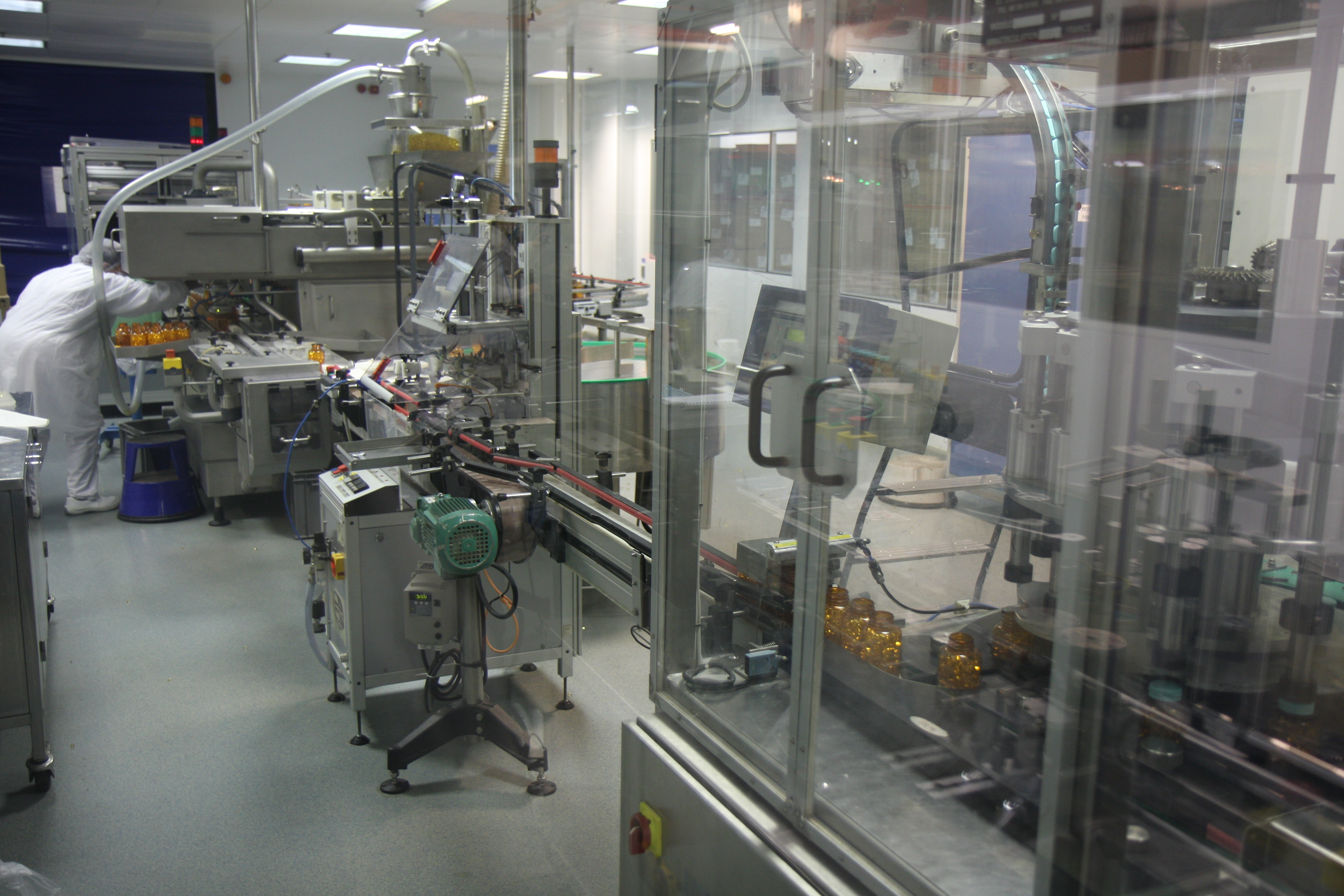
Example pharmaceutical packaging line

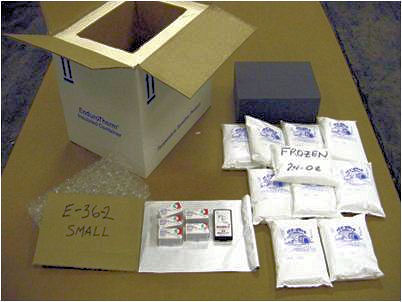
Shipment of vaccine:PU insulated box, jell packs, temp monitor, etc.
