= Duract =

Duract is or was a trade name for the following pharmaceutical drugs:

- Bromfenac, a discontinued pain medication
- Dextromethorphan ("Duract Max Strength Cough"), a cough medication
