= Pharmaceutical marketing =

Advertising by pharmaceutical companies

Pharmaceutical marketing is a branch of marketing science and practice focused on the communication, differential positioning and commercialization of pharmaceutical products, like specialist drugs, biotech drugs and over-the-counter drugs. By extension, this definition is sometimes also used for marketing practices applied to nutraceuticals and medical devices.

Whilst rule of law regulating pharmaceutical industry marketing activities is widely variable across the world, pharmaceutical marketing is usually strongly regulated by international and national agencies, like the Food and Drug Administration and the European Medicines Agency. Local regulations from government or local pharmaceutical industry associations like Pharmaceutical Research and Manufacturers of America or European Federation of Pharmaceutical Industries and Associations (EFPIA) can further limit or specify allowed commercial practices.

== To health care providers ==
Marketing to health-care providers takes three main forms: activity by pharmaceutical sales representatives, provision of drug samples, and sponsoring continuing medical education (CME). The use of gifts, including pens and coffee mugs embossed with pharmaceutical product names, has been prohibited by PHRMA ethics guidelines since 2008. Of the 237,000 medical sites representing 680,000 physicians surveyed in SK&A's 2010 Physician Access survey, half said they prefer or require an appointment to see a rep (up from 38.5% preferring or requiring an appointment in 2008), while 23% won't see reps at all, according to the survey data. Practices owned by hospitals or health systems are tougher to get into than private practices, since appointments have to go through headquarters, the survey found. 13.3% of offices with just one or two doctors won't see representatives, compared with a no-see rate of 42% at offices with 10 or more doctors. The most accessible physicians for promotional purposes are allergists/immunologists – only 4.2% won't see reps at all – followed by orthopedic specialists (5.1%) and diabetes specialists (7.6%). Diagnostic radiologists are the most rigid about allowing details – 92.1% won't see reps – followed by pathologists and neuroradiologists, at 92.1% and 91.8%, respectively.

E-detailing is widely used to reach "no see physicians"; approximately 23% of primary care physicians and 28% of specialists prefer computer-based e-detailing, according to survey findings reported in the 25 April 2011 edition of American Medical News (AMNews), published by the American Medical Association (AMA).

=== PhRMA Code ===
The Pharmaceutical Research and Manufacturers of America (PhRMA) released updates to its voluntary Code on Interactions with Healthcare Professionals on 10 July 2008. The new guidelines took effect in January 2009.

In addition to prohibiting small gifts and reminder items such as pens, notepads, staplers, clipboards, paperweights, pill boxes, etc., the revised Code:

1. Prohibits company sales representatives providing restaurant meals to healthcare professionals, but allows them to provide occasional modest meals in healthcare professionals' offices in conjunction with informational presentations"
2. Includes new provisions requiring companies to ensure their representatives are sufficiently trained about applicable laws, regulations, and industry codes of practice and ethics.
3. Provides that each company will state its intentions to abide by the Code and that company CEOs and compliance officers will certify each year that they have processes in place to comply.
4. Includes more detailed standards regarding the independence of continuing medical education.
5. Provides additional guidance and restrictions for speaking and consulting arrangements with healthcare professionals.

=== Free samples ===
Free samples have been shown to affect physician prescribing behavior. Physicians with access to free samples are more likely to prescribe brand name medication over equivalent generic medications. Other studies found that free samples decreased the likelihood that physicians would follow the standard of care practices.

Receiving pharmaceutical samples does not reduce prescription costs. Even after receiving samples, sample recipients remain disproportionately burdened by prescription costs.

It is argued that a benefit to free samples is the "try it before you buy it" approach. Free samples give immediate access to the medication and the patient can begin treatment right away. It also saves time from going to a pharmacy to get it filled before treatment begins. Since not all medications work for everyone, and many do not work the same way for each person, free samples allow patients to find which dose and brand of medication works best before having to spend money on a filled prescription at a pharmacy.

=== Continuing medical education ===
Hours spent by physicians in industry-supported continuing medical education (CME) is greater than that from either medical schools or professional societies.

=== Pharmaceutical representatives ===
Currently, there are approximately 81,000 pharmaceutical sales representatives in the United States pursuing some 830,000 pharmaceutical prescribers. A pharmaceutical representative will often try to see a given physician every few weeks. Representatives often have a call list of about 200–300 physicians with 120–180 targets that should be visited in 1–2 or 3 week cycle.

Because of the large size of the pharmaceutical sales force, the organization, management, and measurement of effectiveness of the sales force are significant business challenges. Management tasks are usually broken down into the areas of physician targeting, sales force size and structure, sales force optimization, call planning, and sales forces effectiveness. A few pharmaceutical companies have realized that training sales representatives on high science alone is not enough, especially when most products are similar in quality. Thus, training sales representatives on relationship selling techniques in addition to medical science and product knowledge, can make a difference in sales force effectiveness. Specialist physicians are relying more and more on specialty sales reps for product information, because they are more knowledgeable than primary care reps.

The United States has 81,000 pharmaceutical representatives or 1 for every 7.9 physicians. The number and persistence of pharmaceutical representatives has placed a burden on the time of physicians. "As the number of reps went up, the amount of time an average rep spent with doctors went down—so far down, that tactical scaling has spawned a strategic crisis. Physicians no longer spend much time with sales reps, nor do they see this as a serious problem."

Marketers must decide on the appropriate size of a sales force needed to sell a particular portfolio of drugs to the target market. Factors influencing this decision are the optimal reach (how many physicians to see) and frequency (how often to see them) for each individual physician, how many patients with that disease state, how many sales representatives to devote to office and group practice and how many to devote to hospital accounts if needed. To aid this decision, customers are broken down into different classes according to their prescription behavior, patient population, their business potential, and event their personality traits.

Marketers attempt to identify the set of physicians most likely to prescribe a given drug. Historically, this was done by drug reps 'on the ground' using zip code sales and engaging in recon to figure out who the high prescribers were in a particular sales territory. However, in the mid-1990s the industry, through third-party prescribing data (e.g., Quintiles/IMS) switched to "script-tracking" technologies, measuring the number of total prescriptions (TRx) and new prescriptions (NRx) per week that each physician writes. This information is collected by commercial vendors. The physicians are then "deciled" into ten groups based on their writing patterns. Higher deciles are more aggressively targeted. Some pharmaceutical companies use additional information such as:

- Profitability of a prescription (script)
- Accessibility of the physician
- Tendency of the physician to use the pharmaceutical company's drugs
- Effect of managed care formularies on the ability of the physician to prescribe a drug
- The adoption sequence of the physician (that is, how readily the physician adopts new drugs in place of older treatments)
- The tendency of the physician to use a wide palette of drugs
- Influence that physicians have on their colleagues.

Physicians are perhaps the most important component in sales. They write the prescriptions that determine which drugs will be used by people. Influencing the physician is the key to pharmaceutical sales. Historically, by a large pharmaceutical sales force. A medium-sized pharmaceutical company might have a sales force of 1000 representatives. The largest companies have tens of thousands of representatives around the world. Sales representatives called upon physicians regularly, providing clinical information, approved journal articles, and free drug samples. This is still the approach today; however, economic pressures on the industry are causing pharmaceutical companies to rethink the traditional sales process to physicians. The industry has seen a large scale adoption of Pharma CRM systems that works on laptops and more recently tablets. The new age pharmaceutical representative is armed with key data at his fingertips and tools to maximize the time spent with physicians.

=== Pharmaceutical Company Payments ===
Pharmaceutical and medical device companies have also paid physicians to use their drugs, which could affect how often a drug is prescribed. For example, one study that looked at physician payments and pimavanserin found that "extensive physician payments have been associated with increased pimavanserin prescription volume and Medicare expenditures."

More specifically, drug reps help to create a culture of gifting, or the "pharmaceutical gift exchange," where actual monetary transactions are rare. In reality, gifts, both large and small, ranging from cups of coffee to travel to medical conferences are exchanged on a routine basis with high prescribers in an effort to shift their obligations from patients to prescriptions and have proven effective.

=== Peer influence ===
Key opinion leaders

Key opinion leaders (KOL), or "thought leaders", are respected individuals, such as prominent medical school faculty, who influence physicians through their professional status. Pharmaceutical companies generally engage key opinion leaders early in the drug development process to provide advocacy and key marketing feedback.

Some pharmaceutical companies identify key opinion leaders through direct inquiry of physicians (primary research). Recently, pharmaceutical companies have begun to use social network analysis to uncover thought leaders; because it does not introduce respondent bias, which is commonly found in primary research; it can identify and map out the entire scientific community for a disease state; and it has greater compliance with state and federal regulations; because physician prescribing patterns are not used to create the social network.

Colleagues

Physicians acquire information through informal contacts with their colleagues, including social events, professional affiliations, common hospital affiliations, and common medical school affiliations. Some pharmaceutical companies identify influential colleagues through commercially available prescription writing and patient level data. Doctor dinner meetings are an effective way for physicians to acquire educational information from respected peers and to influence the so-called "no-see" physicians - those that are reluctant to engage directly with pharmaceutical reps through detailing but may come to a dinner program where a local or national expert is talking. These meetings are sponsored by some pharmaceutical companies.

=== Journal articles and technical documentation ===
Legal cases and US congressional hearings have provided access to pharmaceutical industry documents revealing new marketing strategies for drugs. Activities once considered independent of promotional intent, including continuing medical education and medical research, are used, including paying to publish articles about promoted drugs for the medical literature, and alleged suppression of unfavorable study results.

=== Private and public insurers ===
Public and private insurers affect the writing of prescriptions by physicians through formularies that restrict the number and types of drugs that the insurer will cover. Not only can the insurer affect drug sales by including or excluding a particular drug from a formulary, they can affect sales by tiering, or placing bureaucratic hurdles to prescribing certain drugs. In January 2006, the United States instituted a new public prescription drug plan through its Medicare program. Known as Medicare Part D, this program engages private insurers to negotiate with pharmaceutical companies for the placement of drugs on tiered formularies.

== To consumers ==
Only two countries as of 2008 allow direct to consumer advertising (DTCA): the United States and New Zealand. Since the late 1970s, DTCA of prescription drugs has become important in the United States. It takes two main forms: the promotion or creation of a disease out of a non-pathologic physical condition or the promotion of a medication. The rhetorical objective of direct-to-consumer advertising is to directly influence the patient-physician dialogue. Many patients will inquire about, or even demand a medication they have seen advertised on television. In the United States, recent years have seen an increase in mass media advertisements for pharmaceuticals. Expenditures on direct-to-users advertising almost quadrupled in the seven years between 1997 and 2005 since the FDA changed the guidelines, from $1.1 billion in 1997 to more than $4.2 billion in 2005, a 19.6% annual increase, according to the United States Government Accountability Office, 2006).

The mass marketing to users of pharmaceuticals is banned in over 30 industrialized nations, but not in the US and New Zealand, which is considering a ban. Some feel it is better to leave the decision wholly in the hands of medical professionals; others feel that users education and participation in health is useful, but users need independent, comparative information about drugs (not promotional information). For these reasons, most countries impose limits on pharmaceutical mass marketing that are not placed on the marketing of other products. In some areas it is required that ads for drugs include a list of possible side effects, so that users are informed of both facets of a medicine. Canada's limitations on pharmaceutical advertising ensure that commercials that mention the name of a product cannot in any way describe what it does. Commercials that mention a medical problem cannot also mention the name of the product for sale; at most, they can direct the viewer to a website or telephone number operated by the pharmaceutical company.

Reynold Spector has provided examples of how positive and negative hype can affect perceptions of pharmaceuticals using examples of certain cancer drugs, such as Avastin and Opdivo, in the former case and statins in the latter.

=== Drug coupons ===
In the United States, pharmaceutical companies often provide drug coupons to consumers to help offset the copayments charged by health insurers for prescription medication. These coupons are generally used to promote medications that compete with non-preferred products and cheaper, generic alternatives by reducing or eliminating the extra out-of-pocket costs that an insurers typically charge a patient for a non-preferred drug product. But sometimes coupons for brand-name drugs could potentially distort the market and leading to higher overall healthcare costs since they encourage the overuse of more expensive drugs over generic alternatives. Consumers often realize too late that the continued use of these drugs without coupons necessitates either switching to a cheaper generic or facing steep out-of-pocket expenses.

== Economics ==
Pharmaceutical company spending on marketing exceeds that spent on research. In 2004 in Canada $1.7 billion was spent marketing drugs to physicians and in the United States $21 billion was spent in 2002. In 2005, pharmaceutical marketing in the United States was estimated at $29.9 billion with one estimate as high as $57 billion. The US spending broken down was 56% in free samples, 25% for detailing of physicians, 12.5% was direct to users advertising, 4% on hospital detailing, and 2% on journal ads. In the United States approximately $20 billion could be saved if generics were used instead of equivalent brand name products.

Although pharmaceutical companies have made large investments in marketing, overall promotional spending decreased by 10 percent from 2009 to 2010. Pharmaceutical companies cut back mostly in detailing and sampling, while spending on mailings and print advertising grew over the year.

== Regulation and fraud ==
=== European Union ===
In the European Union, marketing of pharmaceuticals is regulated by EU (formerly EEC) Directive 92/28/EEC. Among other things, it requires member states to prohibit off-label marketing, and direct-to-consumer marketing of prescription-only medications.

=== United States ===
In the United States, marketing and distribution of pharmaceuticals is regulated by the Federal Food, Drug, and Cosmetic Act and the Prescription Drug Marketing Act, respectively. Food and Drug Administration (FDA) regulations require all prescription drug promotion to be truthful and not misleading, based on "substantial evidence or substantial clinical experience", to provide a "fair balance" between the risks and benefits of the promoted drug, and to maintain consistency with labeling approved by the FDA. The FDA Office of Prescription Drug Promotion enforces these requirements.

In the 1990s, antipsychotics were "still seen as treatments for the most serious mental illnesses, like hallucinatory schizophrenia, and recast them for much broader uses". Drugs such as Abilify and Geodon were given to a broad range of patients, from preschoolers to octogenarians. In 2010, more than a half-million youths took antipsychotic drugs, and one-quarter of nursing-home residents have used them. Yet the government warns that the drugs may be fatal to some older patients and have unknown effects on children.

Every major company selling the drugs—Bristol-Myers Squibb, Eli Lilly, Pfizer, AstraZeneca, and Johnson & Johnson—has either settled recent government cases, under the False Claims Act, for hundreds of millions of dollars or is currently under investigation for possible health care fraud. Following charges of illegal marketing, two of the settlements in 2009 set records for the largest criminal fines ever imposed on corporations. One involved Eli Lilly's antipsychotic Zyprexa, and the other involved Bextra. In the Bextra case, the government also charged Pfizer with illegally marketing another antipsychotic, Geodon; Pfizer settled that part of the claim for $301 million, without admitting any wrongdoing.

The following is a list of the four largest settlements reached with pharmaceutical companies from 1991 to 2012, rank ordered by the size of the total settlement. Legal claims against the pharmaceutical industry have varied widely over the past two decades, including Medicare and Medicaid fraud, off-label promotion, and inadequate manufacturing practices.

Company	Settlement	Violation(s)	Year	Product(s)	Laws allegedly violated (if applicable)
GlaxoSmithKline	$3 billion	Off-label promotion/failure to disclose safety data	2012	Avandia/Wellbutrin/Paxil	False Claims Act/FDCA
Pfizer	$2.3 billion	Off-label promotion/kickbacks	2009	Bextra/Geodon/Zyvox/Lyrica	False Claims Act/FDCA
Abbott Laboratories	$1.5 billion	Off-label promotion	2012	Depakote	False Claims Act/FDCA
Eli Lilly	$1.4 billion	Off-label promotion	2009	Zyprexa	False Claims Act/FDCA

== Evolution of marketing ==
The emergence of new media and technologies in recent years is quickly changing the pharmaceutical marketing landscape in the United States. Both physicians and users are increasing their reliance on the Internet as a source of health and medical information, prompting pharmaceutical marketers to look at digital channels for opportunities to reach their target audiences.

In 2008, 84% of U.S. physicians used the Internet and other technologies to access pharmaceutical, biotech or medical device information—a 20% increase from 2004. At the same time, sales reps are finding it more difficult to get time with doctors for in-person details. Pharmaceutical companies are exploring online marketing as an alternative way to reach physicians. Emerging e-promotional activities include live video detailing, online events, electronic sampling, and physician customer service portals such as PV Updates, MDLinx, Aptus Health (former Physicians Interactive), and Epocrates.

Direct-to-users marketers are also recognizing the need to shift to digital channels as audiences become more fragmented and the number of access points for news, entertainment and information multiplies. Standard television, radio and print direct-to-users (DTC) advertisements are less relevant than in the past, and companies are beginning to focus more on digital marketing efforts like product websites, online display advertising, search engine marketing, social media campaigns, place-based media and mobile advertising to reach the over 145 million U.S. adults online for health information.

In 2010, the FDA's Division of Drug Marketing, Advertising and Communications issued a warning letter concerning two unbranded consumer targeted Web sites sponsored by Novartis Pharmaceuticals Corporation as the websites promoted a drug for an unapproved use, the websites failed to disclose the risks associated with the use of the drug and made unsubstantiated dosing claims.

== See also ==
- Big Pharma conspiracy theory
- Big Pharma: How the World's Biggest Drug Companies Control Illness (2006) by Jacky Law
- Side Effects (2008) by Alison Bass
- Bad Pharma (2012) by Ben Goldacre
- Disease mongering
- Ethics in pharmaceutical sales
- Inverse benefit law
- National pharmaceuticals policy
- Pharmaceutical lobby
- Prescription Drug Marketing Act
- Prescription drug prices in the United States
