= Legality of drugs =

Legality of drugs may refer to:

- Drug regulation
- Drug legalization
- Prohibition of drugs

== See also ==
- Drug trade
