= ISTA Pharmaceuticals =

US-based pharmaceutical company

ISTA Pharmaceuticals, Inc.
- Company type: Subsidiary
- Traded as: Nasdaq: ISTA
- Industry: Pharmaceuticals
- Founded: 1992; 34 years ago
- Headquarters: Irvine, California
- Key people: Vicente Anido Jr., Ph.D. (president, CEO); Glenn E. Davis (vice president, Chief Compliance Officer); Marvin J. Garrett (vice president, Regulatory Affairs, Quality & Compliance); Kathleen McGinley (Vice President, Human Resources & Corporate Services)
- Products: Bromday, Bepreve, Xibrom, Istalol, Vitrase
- Website: www.istavision.com

ISTA Pharmaceuticals, Inc., was a US-based pharmaceutical company that specialized in ophthalmic pharmaceutical products and discovers, develops, and markets therapies for inflammation, ocular pain, glaucoma, allergy, and dry eye. ISTA was acquired by Bausch & Lomb, an eye care company, on March 26, 2012. Under the deal, Bausch & Lomb have agreed to pay $9.10 per share for ISTA, bringing the total value of the acquisition to $500 million. In 2012, Valeant Pharmaceuticals withdrew its $360 million offer.

== Products ==
- Bromday (bromfenac ophthalmic solution) 0.09% for the treatment of postoperative inflammation and reduction of ocular pain in patients who have undergone cataract extraction
- Bepreve (bepotastine besilate ophthalmic solution) 1.5% for the treatment of itching associated with signs and symptoms of allergic conjunctivitis
- Xibrom (bromfenac ophthalmic solution) 0.09% for the treatment of inflammation and pain following cataract surgery (no longer being manufactured as of February 2011)
- Istalol (timolol maleate ophthalmic solution) 0.5% for the treatment of elevated intraocular pressure in patients with ocular hypertension or open-angle glaucoma
- Vitrase (hyaluronidase injection) Ovine, 200 USP units/mL for use as an adjuvant to increase the absorption and dispersion of other injected drugs; for hypodermoclysis; and as an adjunct in subcutaneous urography for improving resorption of radiopaque agents

== Litigation ==
On May 24, 2013, ISTA Pharmaceuticals entered a guilty plea to federal felony charge of conspiracy to introduce a misbranded drug into interstate commerce and conspiracy to pay illegal remuneration in violation of the Federal Anti-Kickback Statute. ISTA agreed to pay $33.5 million to resolve criminal and civil liability arising from its marketing, distribution and sale of its drug Xibrom.
