= Pharmaceutical sales representative =

Salespeople employed by pharmaceutical companies

Pharmaceutical sales representatives or Medical sales respresentatives are salespeople employed by pharmaceutical companies to persuade doctors to prescribe their drugs to patients. Drug companies in the United States spend ~$5 billion annually sending representatives to doctors, to provide product information, answer questions on product use, and deliver product samples. These interactions are governed according to limits established by the Code on Interactions with Health Care Professionals, created by the Pharmaceutical Research and Manufacturers of America (PhRMA). This code came into practice in 2002 and has since been updated to help define ethical interactions between health care professionals and the pharmaceutical companies.

Companies maintain this provides an educational service by keeping doctors updated on the latest changes in medical science. Critics point to a systematic use of gifts and personal information to befriend doctors to influence their drug prescriptions. In the United Kingdom representatives are governed by a strict code of conduct from the Association of the British Pharmaceutical Industry (ABPI). No gifts are allowed. Companies are fined and held in breach if they use the tactics described in this description.

== Qualifications ==
The journey to becoming a Pharmaceutical/Medical Sales Representative typically begins with obtaining a relevant educational background. While a specific degree was not always mandatory, having a degree in fields such as life sciences, nursing, or business/commerce is seen as advantageous in 2023. This educational foundation provides essential knowledge about medical products and the healthcare industry, which is crucial for effective communication with clients. Additionally, pursuing courses in sales and marketing can further enhance one's skills and understanding of the sales process.

== Methods ==
Doctors can receive small gifts, such as free dinners, event or travel tickets, clocks, free drug samples and swag like pens, paper pads, and office toys with company logos. Controversial inducements include jobs offers for the drug company, consulting / speaking fees, and all-expense-paid travel to resorts and exotic locations where attendance is limited or not mandatory.

Pharmaceutical Representative is a trade journal featuring common sales tactics such as how to close a tough sale by flattering a stubborn doctor. Along with flattery, the attractiveness of sales reps has been noted, with a trend of former cheerleaders entering the field. Researchers stated that "seduction appeared to be a deliberate industry strategy", and in informal survey by a doctor found that 12 out of 13 women sales reps said they had been sexually harassed by doctors.

=== Me-too drugs ===
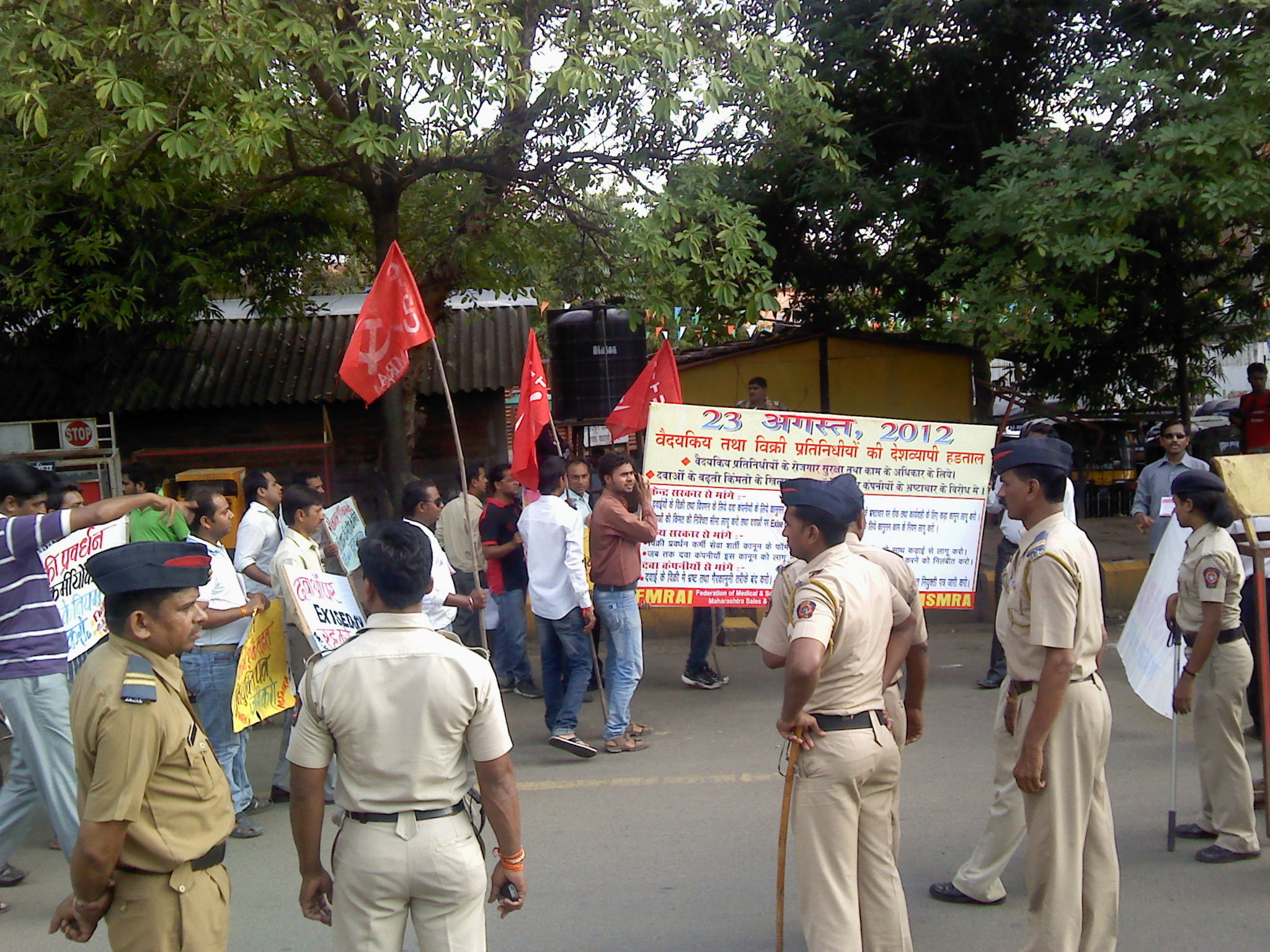
Medical Representatives are seen protesting against the policies of multinational pharmaceutical companies and job security.

Issues can arise regarding the multi-million dollar industry in which pharmaceutical and medical reps work. A number of sales reps have reportedly pushed new "follow on" or "me-too" drugs with free samples that are more expensive than existing generic drugs, such as Nexium which costs three times as much as its predecessor Prilosec, with no evidence of improved efficacy. With beta-blockers and statins, me-too drugs have improved results, and increased competition while lowering prices. As me-too drugs are similar but new, their side effects can be unknown and not well understood. Pharmaceutical marketing / reps assert a me-too drug may work better than another, but they "don’t test their me-too drugs in people who have not done well with an earlier drug of the same class."

== Laws ==
In 1990, the Food and Drug Administration (FDA) passed laws banning "gifts of substantial value" of drug companies to doctors, however this has changed the gifts from objects to meals and travel.

In 2006, New Hampshire forbid the sale of prescription data to commercial entities.

Encountering ill-informed reps at his practice Dr. Dan Foster, a West Virginia surgeon and lawmaker, introduced a bill to require reps to have science degrees. While it did not pass, it led to a disclosure of minimum hiring requirements.

== Alternatives ==
In Australia the government funds academic detailers that are impartial medical students who provide drug information to medical professionals.

== See also ==
- Bad Pharma (2012) by Ben Goldacre
- Big Pharma (2006) by Jacky Law
- Me-too compound
- Pharmaceutical companies
- Pharmaceutical marketing
- Ethics in pharmaceutical sales
- Sales techniques
