= Ethics in pharmaceutical sales =

The ethics involved within pharmaceutical sales is built from the organizational ethics, which is a matter of system compliance, accountability and culture (Grace & Cohen, 2005). Organizational ethics are used when developing the marketing and sales strategy to both the public and the healthcare profession of the strategy. Organizational ethics are best demonstrated through acts of fairness, compassion, integrity, honor, and responsibility.

== Industry ==
The pharmaceutical industry is a highly competitive business and its success is dependent on the sales and marketing of each drug. The cost of research and development for each drug is hundreds of millions of dollars. In 2005 the research and development expenditure for the biopharmaceutical industry within Europe and the US was 15,474 million euro.(The Pharma Industry Figures, 2006). Some health economists peg the current cost of drug development at US$1.3 billion, others at US$1.7 billion The actual drug discovery and the drug development can take years. After which, testing and clinical trials are required prior to getting approval by regulatory boards. After launching the drug the company has much at stake as it has already outlaid millions of dollars the success of its sales is an important factor to the success of the company.

== Sales practices ==
A pharmaceutical sales representative is the key part within the sales of all drugs. They ensure the healthcare profession is informed of the benefits of the drug along with the safety and the side effects according to the dictate of the company employing them. The term used is ethical promotion, which can be described as communication of ethical values to promote their product to the physician. (Wright & Lundstrom, 2004)

== Regulations and guidelines ==
=== European Federation of Pharmaceutical Industries and Associations ===
The European Federation of Pharmaceutical Industries and Associations (EFPIA) stipulates that there is a Corporate Social responsibility for the pharmaceutical industry to recognize and acknowledge the need to act responsibly towards society and the communities in which it operates.

The EFPIA has also code of practice on the promotion of medicine, which entails the regulations over many areas of the promotion of medicine. These include events and hospitality that can be extended by a pharmaceutical company. Gifts and inducements must be inexpensive and provide value to the practice of medicine or pharmacy. All medical sales representatives must have the adequate training and sufficient scientific knowledge to provide relevant and precise information about the products. They must also comply with the requirements of the applicable codes.

=== Pharmaceutical Research and Manufacturers of America ===
In 2002 the Pharmaceutical Research and Manufacturers of America, issued a set of guidelines for its member companies to follow when it comes to the relationship between drug reps and doctors. The voluntary code significantly changed how drug company representatives interact with doctors. Changes range from restricting gifts to limiting consulting contracts offered to doctors.

PhRMA was inspired to come up with the code after years of criticism from groups like Families USA and Public Citizen. PhRMA already had a set of guidelines on this topic but its board decided that one of the best ways to thwart the criticism and prevent any appearance of impropriety was to come up with a stricter code.

"The PhRMA guidelines are one major factor contributing to a paradigm shift that directly impacts the way our industry conducts business,""Because of this shift, pharmaceutical sales forces must learn new and more compelling ways to create and keep customers, or perish because physicians are no longer willing to listen to their usual approach," said Susan Torroella, CEO of Columbia MedCom Group.

PhRMA is opposed to state laws that regulate interaction between pharmaceutical sales representatives and health care providers. PhRMA officials said state regulations could create a patchwork of conflicting rules across the states that might do more to confuse sales representatives and doctors than prevent improper perks."We do have the comprehensive guidelines combined with the guidelines of the Office of Inspector General. Not only would state laws be a duplication, it could be nightmarish because you would have differing standards for different states," said Jeff Trewhitt, a spokesman for PhRMA.

=== U.S. Department of Health and Human Services ===
After PhRMA enacted its guidelines, the Office of Inspector General for the U.S. Department of Health and Human Services issued guidelines similar to PhRMA's code, except with more severe penalties. Companies that fail to follow the department's rules could face a federal investigation that could lead to civil penalties.

== Health care fraud ==
Pharmaceutical fraud involves activities that result in false claims to insurers or programs such as Medicare in the United States or equivalent state programs for financial gain to a pharmaceutical company. There are several different schemes used to defraud the health care system which are particular to the pharmaceutical industry. These include: Good Manufacturing Practice (GMP) Violations, Off Label Marketing, Best Price Fraud, CME Fraud, Medicaid Price Reporting, and Manufactured Compound Drugs. The Federal Bureau of Investigation (FBI) estimates that health care fraud costs American taxpayers $60 billion a year. Of this amount $2.5 billion was recovered through False Claims Act cases in FY 2010. Examples of fraud cases include the Pfizer $2.3 billion settlement and Merck $650 million settlement. Damages from fraud can be recovered by use of the False Claims Act, most commonly under the qui tam provisions which rewards an individual for being a "whistleblower", or relator (law).

Antipsychotic drugs are now the top-selling class of pharmaceuticals in America, generating annual revenue of about $14.6 billion. Every major company selling the drugs — Bristol-Myers Squibb, Eli Lilly, Pfizer, AstraZeneca and Johnson & Johnson — has either settled recent government cases, under the False Claims Act, for hundreds of millions of dollars or is currently under investigation for possible health care fraud. Following charges of illegal marketing, two of the settlements set records last year for the largest criminal fines ever imposed on corporations. One involved Eli Lilly’s antipsychotic Zyprexa, and the other involved Bextra. In the Bextra case, the government also charged Pfizer with illegally marketing another antipsychotic, Geodon; Pfizer settled that part of the claim for $301 million, without admitting any wrongdoing.

On 2 July 2012, GlaxoSmithKline pleaded guilty to criminal charges and agreed to a $3 billion settlement of the largest health-care fraud case in the U.S. and the largest payment by a drug company. The settlement is related to the company's illegal promotion of prescription drugs, its failure to report safety data, bribing doctors, and promoting medicines for uses for which they were not licensed. The drugs involved were Paxil, Wellbutrin, Advair, Lamictal, and Zofran for off-label, non-covered uses. Those and the drugs Imitrex, Lotronex, Flovent, and Valtrex were involved in the kickback scheme.

The following is a list of the four largest settlements reached with pharmaceutical companies from 1991 to 2012, rank ordered by the size of the total settlement. Legal claims against the pharmaceutical industry have varied widely over the past two decades, including Medicare and Medicaid fraud, off-label promotion, and inadequate manufacturing practices.

| Company | Settlement | Violation(s) | Year | Product(s) | Laws allegedly violated (if applicable) |
|---|---|---|---|---|---|
| GlaxoSmithKline | $3 billion | Off-label promotion/ failure to disclose safety data | 2012 | Avandia/Wellbutrin/Paxil | False Claims Act/FDCA |
| Pfizer | $2.3 billion | Off-label promotion/ kickbacks | 2009 | Bextra/Geodon/ Zyvox/Lyrica | False Claims Act/FDCA |
| Abbott Laboratories | $1.5 billion | Off-label promotion | 2012 | Depakote | False Claims Act/FDCA |
| Eli Lilly | $1.4 billion | Off-label promotion | 2009 | Zyprexa | False Claims Act/FDCA |

== Advocacy groups ==
=== No Free Lunch ===
Some physicians have joined an organization No Free Lunch which asked physicians to make a pledge to not accept any pharmaceutical companies gifts no matter how large or small. The members base that gift giving forms relationships, which influences behaviour and creates a conflict of interest.

== See also ==
- Inverse benefit law
- Pharmaceutical marketing
- Pharmaceutical lobby
- Access to medicines
