= Fort Madison station =

Fort Madison station might refer to the following stations in Fort Madison, Iowa:

- Atchison, Topeka and Santa Fe Passenger and Freight Complex Historic District, the former Atchison, Topeka and Santa Fe Railway station and active Amtrak station from 2021 to the present
- Fort Madison station (1968–2021), the former Atchison, Topeka and Santa Fe Railway replacement station and Amtrak station from 1968 to 2021
