= Pharmaceutical Group of the European Union =

The Pharmaceutical Group of the European Union (PGEU) is the European association representing more than 400,000 community pharmacists contributing to the health of over 500 million people throughout Europe. PGEU's membership consists of national associations and professional organizations representing community pharmacists across 33 European countries, including EU Member States, EU candidate countries, as well as nations within the European Economic Area and EEA/EFTA.

PGEU was founded in 1959 following the first “pharmacy days” meeting held in Milan, Italy. Its mission is to promote the role of the pharmacist as a key health professionals within national health systems, making a dynamic and evolving contribution to improving the health of the communities they serve.
