= Amfenac =

Chemical compound

Clinical data
- ATC code: none

Identifiers
- IUPAC name: (2-Amino-3-benzoylphenyl)acetic acid
- CAS Number: 51579-82-9
- PubChem CID: 2136
- IUPHAR/BPS: 7565
- ChemSpider: 2051
- UNII: 28O5C1J38A
- KEGG: D07443
- ChEBI: CHEBI:75915
- ChEMBL: ChEMBL25146
- CompTox Dashboard (EPA): DTXSID90199533

Chemical and physical data
- Formula: C_{15}H_{13}NO_{3}
- Molar mass: 255.273 g·mol^{−1}
- 3D model (JSmol): Interactive image
- SMILES: O=C(c1cccc(c1N)CC(=O)O)c2ccccc2
- InChI: InChI=1S/C15H13NO3/c16-14-11(9-13(17)18)7-4-8-12(14)15(19)10-5-2-1-3-6-10/h1-8H,9,16H2,(H,17,18); Key:SOYCMDCMZDHQFP-UHFFFAOYSA-N

Amfenac, also known as 2-amino-3-benzoylbenzeneacetic acid, is a nonsteroidal anti-inflammatory drug (NSAID) with acetic acid moiety.

== See also ==
- Bromfenac (same structure as amfenac but with p-bromo)
