= Polyfothine =

Names
- Preferred IUPAC name 7,8-Dimethoxy-4-methyl-5H-indeno[1,2-b]pyridin-5-one

Identifiers
CAS Number	122908-91-2
3D model (JSmol)	Interactive image
ChEMBL	ChEMBL464665
ChemSpider	23340041
PubChem CID	14378578
UNII	XQ995N5UJF
CompTox Dashboard (EPA)	DTXSID401045603
- InChI: InChI=1S/C15H13NO3/c1-8-4-5-16-14-9-6-11(18-2)12(19-3)7-10(9)15(17)13(8)14/h4-7H,1-3H3 Key: RBIBQZUFRNYSOK-UHFFFAOYSA-N; InChI=1/C15H13NO3/c1-8-4-5-16-14-9-6-11(18-2)12(19-3)7-10(9)15(17)13(8)14/h4-7H,1-3H3 Key: RBIBQZUFRNYSOK-UHFFFAOYAG
- SMILES: CC1=C2C(=NC=C1)C3=CC(=C(C=C3C2=O)OC)OC

Properties
Chemical formula	C_{15}H_{13}NO_{3}
Molar mass	255.273 g·mol^{−1}
- Except where otherwise noted, data are given for materials in their standard state (at 25 °C [77 °F], 100 kPa). Infobox references

Polyfothine is an anticholinergic alkaloid.
