= Fashion Model Directory =

Online fashion-related database

The Fashion Model Directory
- Website type: Online fashion database
- Available in: English
- Owner: Fashion One Group
- Website: fashionmodeldirectory.com
- Commercial: Yes
- Registration: Optional
- Launched: 1998
- Current status: Active

The Fashion Model Directory (FMD) is an online database of information about fashion models, modelling agencies, fashion labels, fashion magazines, fashion designers, and fashion editorials. FMD has been described as "the IMDb of the fashion industry" as one of the largest online fashion databases. Started as an offline project in 1998 by Stuart Howard, FMD went live on the web in 2000 and was taken over by British media group Fashion One Group two years later. In 2026 the database rebranded to FMDB.

== Overview ==
The Fashion Model Directory is one of the world's largest databases of professional female fashion models, modeling agencies, fashion labels, fashion magazines, fashion designers, and fashion editorials. For each model, it includes information about her appearance in advertisements, magazine covers, editorials, and fashion shows, as well as information about her hobbies, official and other websites, and other relevant notes. FMD also provides an extensive picture gallery for each fashion model, including copyright information and photographer credit where available.

The FMD database contains entries for more than 16,000 fashion models, 1,500 fashion designers, 5,000 fashion brands, 3,300 magazines, 23,000 fully credited fashion editorials, and 1,800 modelling agencies as well as one of the largest fashion archives on the web, with over 600,000 photographs.

== History ==
FMD was started as a private offline project in 1998 by Stuart Howard. In 2000, the database went online and was updated every week. Two years later, after being offline for a short time, the project was taken over by British media group Fashion One Group. It was rebranded in May 2011.
