= Prescription Drug Marketing Act =

Legislation in the United States

Prescription Drug Marketing Act of 1987
- Long title: An Act to amend the Federal Food, Drug, and Cosmetic Act to ban the reimportation of drugs produced in the United States, to place restrictions on the distribution of drug samples, to ban certain resales of drugs by hospitals and other health care facilities, and for other purposes.
- Enacted by: the 100th United States Congress
- Effective: April 22, 1988

Citations
- Public law: 100-293
- Statutes at Large: 102 Stat. 95

Codification
- Acts amended: Federal Food, Drug and Cosmetic Act
- Titles amended: 21 U.S.C.: Food and Drugs
- U.S.C. sections amended: 21 U.S.C. ch. 9 §§ 331, 353, 381

Legislative history
- Introduced in the House as H.R. 1207 by John Dingell (D–MI) on February 24, 1987; Committee consideration by House Committee on Energy and Commerce; Passed the House on May 4, 1987 (passed voice vote); Passed the Senate on March 31, 1988 (passed voice vote); Signed into law by President Ronald Reagan on April 22, 1988

Major amendments
- Prescription Drug Amendments of 1992 P.L. 102-353, 106 Stat. 941

The Prescription Drug Marketing Act (PDMA) of 1987 (P.L. 100-293, 102 Stat. 95) is a law of the United States federal government. It establishes legal safeguards for prescription drug distribution to ensure safe and effective pharmaceuticals and is designed to discourage the sale of counterfeit, adulterated, misbranded, sub potent, and expired prescription drugs. It was passed in response to the development of a wholesale sub-market (known as the "diversion market") for prescription drugs.

The PDMA was modified by the Prescription Drug Amendments of 1992 (P.L. 102-353, 106 Stat. 941) on August 26, 1992.

The U.S. Food and Drug Administration (FDA) issued regulations implementing the PDMA in 1990 (21 C.F.R. Part 205) and 1999 (21 C.F.R. Part 203).

== See also ==
- Food and Drug Administration (FDA, USA)
- Drug distribution
- Inverse benefit law
- Regulation of therapeutic goods
