= Falsified Medicines Directive =

European Union directive

The Falsified Medicines Directive is a legal framework introduced by the European Commission, to improve the protection of public health within the European Union. The directive applies since 2 January 2013. The European Commission Delegated Regulation, (EU) 2016/161, supplements Directive 2001/83/EC with rules regarding safety features for the packaging of medicinal products for human use. The regulation was adopted in October 2015. Measures to counteract to fake medicines include stricter record-keeping of wholesale distributors, tougher inspections of pharmaceutical producers, an EU-wide quality mark to identify online pharmacies and obligatory safety features on packages.

It requires that a unique identifier must be encoded in a two-dimensional Data Matrix code printed on each unit of sale package which is to contain:

- Product code
- Randomized serial number
- Expiration date
- Batch or lot number
- National Health Reimbursement Number if required

There must be a Tamper Evident Device.

When the medicine or vaccine is dispensed it must be scanned and the barcode decommissioned, so that it cannot be reused on a falsified medicine.

2,291 pharmaceutical companies with marketing authorisations to supply prescription medicines to the European Economic Area are required to connect to the EU Hub established by the European Medicines Verification Organisation and upload the unique identifier for each pack of medicine they manufacture or repackage before February 2019. By August 2018 only 841 companies had completed the first stage of connection, which may take up to six months. The Market Pharmacy in Bolton, which is part of the Hollowood Chemists group claimed in December 2018 to be the first compliant pharmacy in the UK when it connected to the UK Medicines Verification System in December 2018.

The directive ceased to apply in Great Britain, except in Northern Ireland, at the end of the Brexit transition period.

== See also ==
- 2025 Counterfeit medication scandal
