= Legal drug trade =

Legal drug trade, as with other goods object of commerce, in opposition to smuggling or illegal drug trade, most psychotropic substances' commerce is under control and taxation by world governments, regardless of the relative perceived danger of the goods that are the object of legislation. Legal commerce in drugs can be categorized according to the purpose of consumption (therapeutic vs recreational), type of drug involved and phase of the trading process, i.e.: production, distribution or consumption.

== Therapeutic use ==
=== Production ===
Drugs useful for treating diseases are the object of pharmaceutical research and medical practice, and produced by the pharmaceutical industry, which in theory should be above United Nations legislation prohibiting use or sole possession of the drugs termed illegal for other purposes.

=== Distribution ===
Pharmaceutical companies, through authorized dealers, guarantee the distribution of their products to their customers. Since antiquity, there have been stores specialized in drug selling. Today, they are called pharmacies or, straightforwardly, drugstores. Certain drugs officially considered trade-able without medical supervision are also sold in non-specialized stores, such as supermarkets.

=== Consumption ===
Therapeutic drug consumption can take place in an outpatient setting, or during hospitalization.

== Recreational use ==
=== Production ===
Alcoholic beverages, containing psychoactive ethyl alcohol, are produced legally throughout the world. Their production supports a commercial alcohol industry. Consumption of alcohol is subject to regulation in most countries, namely by means of age restrictions.

Tobacco, a recreational drug containing nicotine, is produced legally in countries such as Cuba, China, and the United States. This also supports a tobacco industry and the production of a variety of tobacco products, which, like alcoholic beverages, are subject to age restrictions in most countries.

Caffeine, a stimulant drug, is extracted from plants including the coffee plant and the tea bush. It is the most widely consumed psychoactive substance in the world, remaining unregulated and generally recognized as safe by the U.S. Food and Drug Administration.

=== Distribution ===
There are authorized dealers which provide consumers with legal intoxicants, every industry developing a network of distribution to connect with its clients. Drug publicity by producers and distributors aims at increasing consumption.

=== Consumption ===
Legal drugs for recreation are taken by people in private and in public, including places devoted to drug selling for consumption in situ, such as bars and certain restaurants.

=== Cultural biases ===
The above-mentioned substances represent the most important products legally produced for the purposes of mind-altering effects. Some critics argue that cannabis and opioids occupy the social position of alcohol and tobacco in some non-western countries, where alcohol and its users could be treated in a way resembling the harassment and prosecution of illegal drug users in western countries, in cultural defiance of the UN's worldwide prohibition. They are also the most important public health concern, as a result of prohibition of certain other drugs.

== See also ==
- Drug liberalization
- Drug prohibition law
- Grey market
- Illegal drug trade
- Pharmaceutical industry
- Prohibition
- Prohibitionism
