= Debra Lampshire =

New Zealand trainer, educator, advocate and experience-based expert on mental health

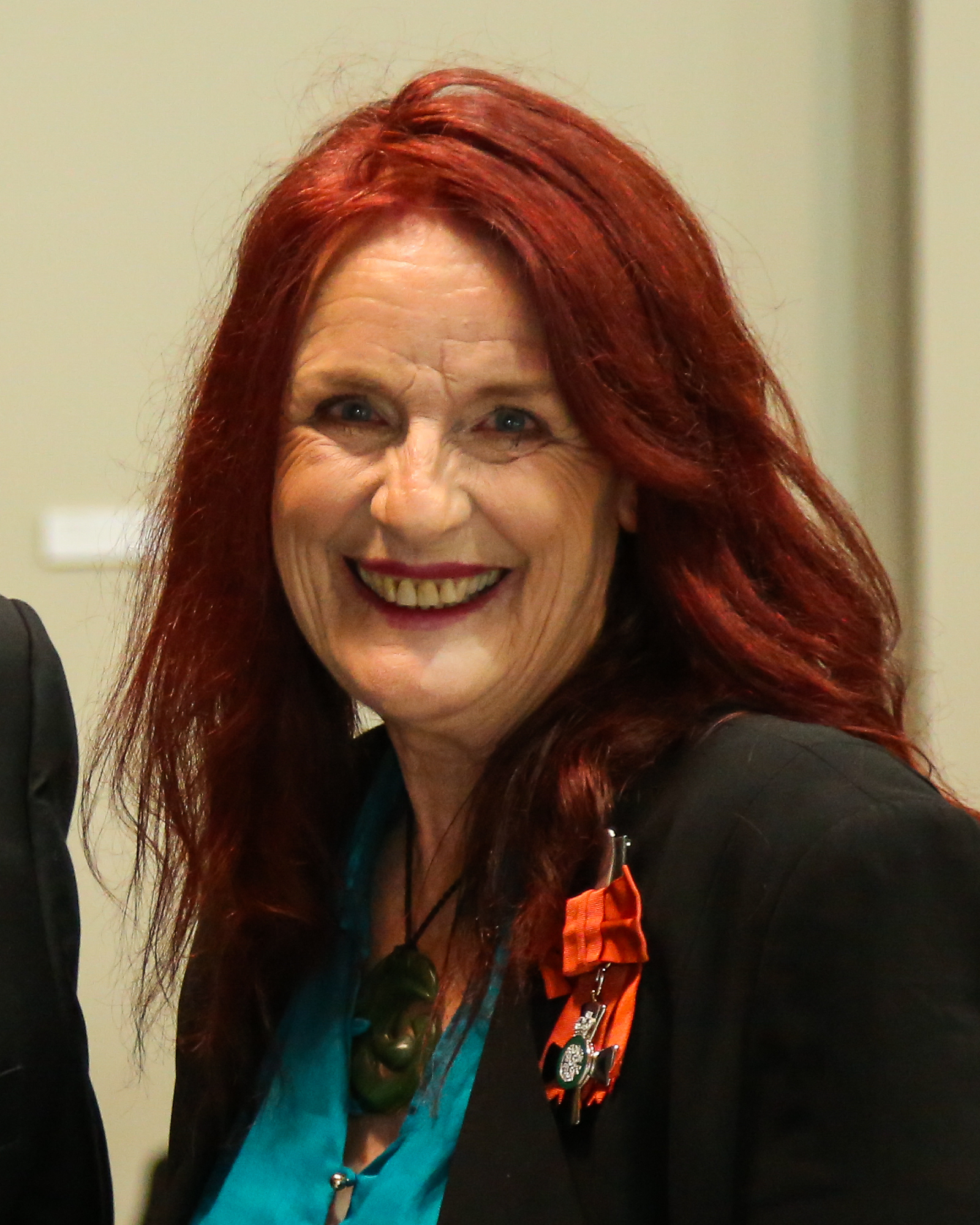
- Lampshire in 2023
- Occupations: Educator, mental health advocate

Debra Joy Lampshire MNZM is a New Zealand trainer, educator, advocate and experience-based expert on mental health.

== Work ==
Lampshire is project manager for the Psychological Interventions for Enduring Mental Illness Project at the Auckland District Health Board (ADHB). She is the first non-clinician to hold this position.

She is also a senior tutor with the Centre for Mental Health Research and Policy Development at the University of Auckland.

She is chairperson for International Society for Psychological and Social Approaches to Psychosis (ISPS) New Zealand.

== Background ==
At the age of 17, she was committed to the former Kingseat Psychiatric Hospital in Karaka, having episodes of psychosis, including hearing voices. She has been in mental health care for 30 years, 18 of those in institutional care. She then began to take charge of her own recovery and has transferred her own experience to educate others.

She has co-authored scientific papers and co-edited the book Experiencing Psychosis.

== Honours and awards ==
Lampshire won the Making a Difference category of the Attitude Awards, and the Supreme Award at the 2016 Attitude Awards. In the 2023 New Year Honours, she was appointed a Member of the New Zealand Order of Merit, for services to mental health.

== Works ==
- Jim Geekie (editor), Patte Randal (editor), Debra Lampshire (editor): Experiencing Psychosis: Personal and Professional Perspectives. The International Society for Psychological and Social Approaches to Psychosis Book Series, The International Society for Psychological Treatments of Schizophrenia and Other Psychoses, 2011, ISBN 978-0415580335

== See also ==
- Hearing Voices Movement
- Rethinking Madness
- Anatomy of an Epidemic
- David Oaks
- Kay Redfield Jamison
