= Rethinking Madness =

2012 book by Paris Williams

Rethinking Madness: Towards a Paradigm Shift In Our Understanding and Treatment of Psychosis
- First edition
- Author: Paris Williams
- Language: English
- Publisher: Sky's Edge Publishing
- Publication date: 2012

Rethinking Madness: Towards a Paradigm Shift In Our Understanding and Treatment of Psychosis (Sky's Edge Publishing, 2012) is a book by the psychologist Paris Williams that explores creative ways of dealing with madness (psychosis). Williams says that psychotic experiences, which cause significant distress, typically occur deep within the mind. Given suitable conditions, this process can often result in a positive outcome, but Williams avoids the romantic notion that psychosis is always beneficial. Much of what Williams says is in close accord with a recovery approach.

Williams says that the term "psychosis" has many meanings, and the definitions that have been put forward are controversial. Even the DSM-IV-TR, says that "the term psychosis has historically received a number of definitions, none of which has achieved universal acceptance".

Williams says that the diagnosis of schizophrenia is also the subject of much debate:

Despite over a century of intensive research, no biological markers or physiological tests that can be used to diagnose schizophrenia have been found, its etiology continues to be uncertain, and we don’t even have clear evidence that the concept of schizophrenia is a valid construct. However, diagnosis and treatment based upon the diagnosis continues unhindered by these serious problems.

William's definition does not match the dominant psychiatric viewpoint on psychosis, which characterizes it as primarily resulting from brain pathology. Neuroscience research has found that dopamine, serotonin, glutamate, and GABA all tend to functionally abnormally in those with schizophrenia. However, Williams makes the case that correlation is not causation, and he documents in detail how such anomalies could be attributed to other factors, including especially neurological harm caused by the use of the psychiatric medications themselves. In particular, he points out that no reliable biomarkers associated with the diagnosis of schizophrenia (or any of the mental health disorders listed in the DSM-5) have been discovered after many years of intense searching, a fact acknowledged by the Chair of the DSM-V task force himself:

Biological and genetic markers that provide precise diagnoses that can be delivered with complete reliability and validity [are still] disappointingly distant. We’ve been telling patients for several decades that we are waiting for biomarkers. We’re still waiting.

A 2020 survey of clinical psychologists in the United Kingdom found that some practitioners have found success incorporating the idea of transformative psychosis into care. The paper concluded that the care models used by clinicians represented an extension of practices recommended by professional organizations such as the American Psychiatric Association and not a qualitatively distinct approach.

== See also ==
- Elyn Saks
- David Oaks
- Stuart A. Kirk
- Robert Whitaker
- Peter Breggin
- Peter Lehmann
- Thomas Szasz
- Anatomy of an Epidemic
