= Psychiatry Under the Influence =

2015 book by Robert Whitaker and Lisa Cosgrove

Psychiatry Under the Influence: Institutional Corruption, Social Injury, and Prescriptions for Reform is a 2015 book by Robert Whitaker and Lisa Cosgrove. The book discusses the use of psychiatric medication in the United States and is critical of the drug industry influence on the field of psychiatry.

== See also ==
- Bad Pharma
- Big Pharma (book)
