= Psychiatric drug epidemic =

Increased prescription and use of psychiatric medication

The idea that there is a phenomenon of rapid increasing exaggerated prescription and consumption of psychiatric drugs has been called the Psychiatric drug epidemic, as well as the Psychiatric medication epidemic. Certain sources, such as Robert Whitaker's Anatomy of an Epidemic, argue that there is an iatrogenic epidemic.

There are also those that argue that there is an epidemic of certain classes of psychiatric drugs, such as benzodiazepines or antidepressants. Despite those arguments, however, many leaders within the psychiatric community assert that the use and increase in psychiatric drug intake, such as antidepressants, lithium and others, is a natural progress of the science and medicine in understanding and treating mental disorders in the modern age.

== History ==
The rise of psychiatric drugs that began in 1954 with thorazine changed the field of psychiatry and started a revolution. However, certain researchers, such as Whitaker, argued that despite the new treatments, the number of mentally ill in countries like the United States skyrocketed. He blames the widespread rise of mental illness in the psychiatric drugs themselves, which he argues are creating many harmful symptoms. Professor of psychology James Davies asserts that the intake of psychiatric drugs, especially in the United States and the UK, has reached epidemic levels, with hundreds of thousands of prescriptions each year. Psychiatrist Peter Breggin argues that psychiatric medications mostly create more mental suffering and make the patients unaware of the side effects, which leads to more drugging, fueling the epidemic.

The Fiocruz institute in Brazil has held multiple seminaries about the subject, with national and international researchers invited.

== Arguments on the psychiatric epidemic ==
=== Peter C. Gøtzsche ===
Danish medical researcher Peter C. Gøtzsche argues that the harms of psychiatric drugs many times surpass the benefits, and that a "huge drug epidemic" has been created.

=== Paulo Amarante ===
Brazilian psychiatrist Paulo Amarante has said that there is growing evidence of the harms of psychoactive substances used by the field of psychiatry, citing Whitaker's book, Anatomy. He points out that abstinence symptoms have been indicated by various works, and that this is a public health problem, as there is a generalized lack of professionals that know how to remove the drugs. Amarante concludes that the drug epidemic must be combated by professionals.

=== Robert Whitaker ===
Whitaker argues that modern psychiatry is based on a model of chemical imbalance that hasn't been proven true. He claims that this paradigm has resulted in the number of mental illness diagnosis increasing radically, and that another harm is that social responses, that are truly effective against mental suffering, have not been executed, such as building more schools, investing money to create a more equal society, etc.

=== John Read ===
The psychologist John Read has criticized the biological model of mental illness, arguing that it is a 'false explanation' for human anguish, which "causes millions of people to unnecessarily take anti-depressants and anti-psychotics", including children. He cites the fact that in England, during 2018, one in six adults were using antidepressants, which he argues is a "bizarre" part of the epidemic.

=== Irving Kirsch ===
Medical researcher and professor of psychology Irving Kirsch has argued, in an event about the epidemic, that antidepressants have little effect when compared to placebos, just as he did in his other works, such as The Emperor's New Drugs. He discusses his past research which led him to arrive at this conclusion. Kirsch also states that many studies that showed little effective difference between psychiatric drugs and placebos were never published, demonstrating pharmaceutical industry bias.

=== James Davies ===
Davies, a professor of psychology and anthropologist, has discussed modern psychiatry in multiple interviews and books. He argues that psychiatric drug consumption reached epidemic levels in the world in general, both in the anglosphere (such as the US and UK), as well as other countries, such as China, Brazil and India. He disagrees with leaders in the psychiatric community who claim that the spread of the drugs are a product of progress in science, contending that independent research into the matter proves that the commercial success of these drugs comes not from actual effectiveness, but rather from pharmaceutical marketing and manipulation of clinical data. Davies also claims that chemical substances in the drugs harm children and adults, which constitutes a main point in the epidemic argument.

=== Peter Breggin ===
Psychiatrist Peter Breggin, often called the "Conscience of Psychiatry", has fought to reform the field. He is notable for criticizing certain methods of modern psychiatry, including heavy drugging and electroconvulsive therapy. He acts as an expert in cases where psychiatric drugs cause adverse side effects, such as violence, suicide, and death.

Breggin argues that neuroleptic drugs (such as anti-psychotics and anti-depressants) are commonly creating harmful side-effects in the brain, often called "lethargic encephalitis." He asserts that pioneer researchers of these drugs knew about the potentially harmful effects, yet the drugs are still prescribed en masse. Breggin concluded that the drugs have, in essence, no curative value and "work" by creating neurological lethargy.

== Antidepressant epidemic discussion ==
The high intake of antidepressants in the modern age and their withdrawal effects continues to be debated. Mark Horowitz pointed that anti-depressants can create dependence and trying to quit them can be life-threatening for many people. Katharine Wallis wrote that: "the tide is turning, and there is growing awareness of the troubles people have coming off antidepressants". Many interviewed by The Guardian have affirmed that they went through "horrible side effects" by trying to quit ADs, and the newspaper argued this pointed to an under-reported silent epidemic.

== Criticism of the idea ==
Certain psychiatrists assert that there is no "epidemic" or "over-prescription" of psychiatric drugs. As is the case with anti-depressants, certain professionals, such as Ronald Pies, defend that, indeed, there are cases where the substances are prescribed too casually, sometimes for instances of normal stress or sadness. However, the actual quantity of AD consumption is, he argues, small, reaching 11% of the population older than 12 in the US.

Multiple leaders within the psychiatric community have affirmed that the growing consumption of psychiatric drugs is a normal phenomenon, given the progress of science and medicine in understanding and treating mental illness. One of the drugs in question is lithium, where experts such as Andrew Nierenberg insist is still the "gold standard of treatment" for bipolar disorder. He says that some side-effects can be expected, such as kidney problems, but the drug is still very effective in treating the illness, however.

== See also ==
- Opioid epidemic
- Psychiatric survivors movement
