= Controversies about psychiatry =

Criticism of psychiatry

Psychiatry is, and has historically been, viewed as controversial by those under its care, as well as sociologists and psychiatrists themselves. There are a variety of reasons cited for this controversy, including the subjectivity of diagnosis, the use of diagnosis and treatment for social and political control including detaining citizens and treating them without consent, the side effects of treatments such as electroconvulsive therapy, antipsychotics and historical procedures like lobotomy and other forms of psychosurgery or insulin shock therapy, and the history of racism within the profession in the United States.

In addition, there are a number of groups who are either critical towards psychiatry or entirely hostile to the field. The Critical Psychiatry Network is a group of psychiatrists who are critical of psychiatry. Additionally, there are self-described psychiatric survivor groups such as MindFreedom International and religious groups such as Scientologists that are critical towards psychiatry.

== Challenges to conceptions of mental illness ==
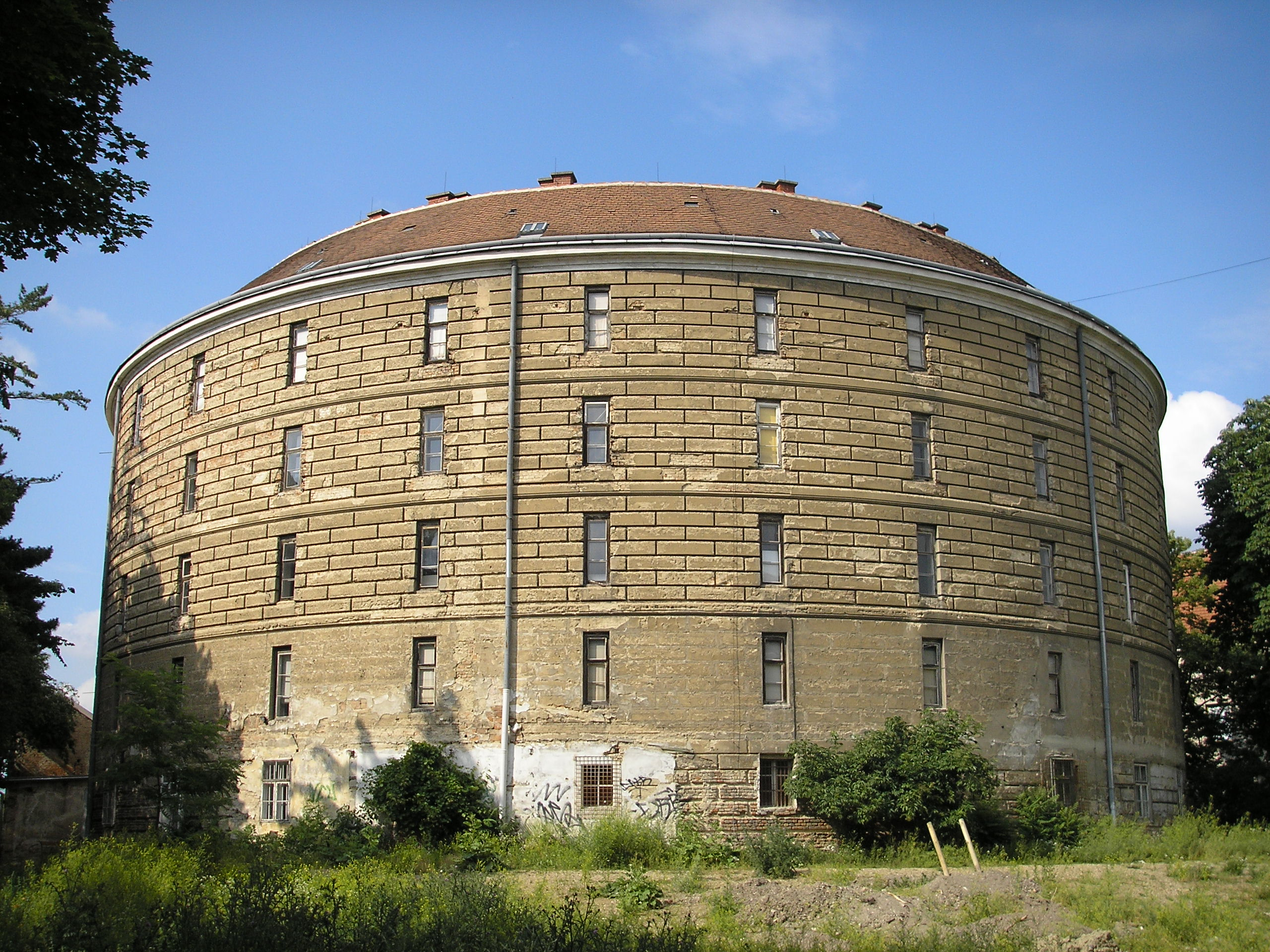
Vienna's Narrenturm — German for "fools' tower" — was one of the earliest buildings specifically designed as a "madhouse". It was built in 1784.

Since the 1960s there have been challenges to the concept of mental illness. Sociologists Erving Goffman and Thomas Scheff argued that mental illness was merely another example of how society labels and controls non-conformists, behavioral psychologists challenged psychiatry's fundamental reliance on unchallengeable or unfalsifiable concepts, and gay rights activists criticized the APA's inclusion of homosexuality as a mental disorder in the DSM. As societal views on homosexuality have changed in recent decades, it is no longer considered a mental illness and is more widely accepted by society. As another example that challenged conceptions of mental illness, a widely publicized study by Professor David Rosenhan, known as the Rosenhan experiment, was viewed as an attack on the efficacy of psychiatric diagnosis.

== Medicalization ==
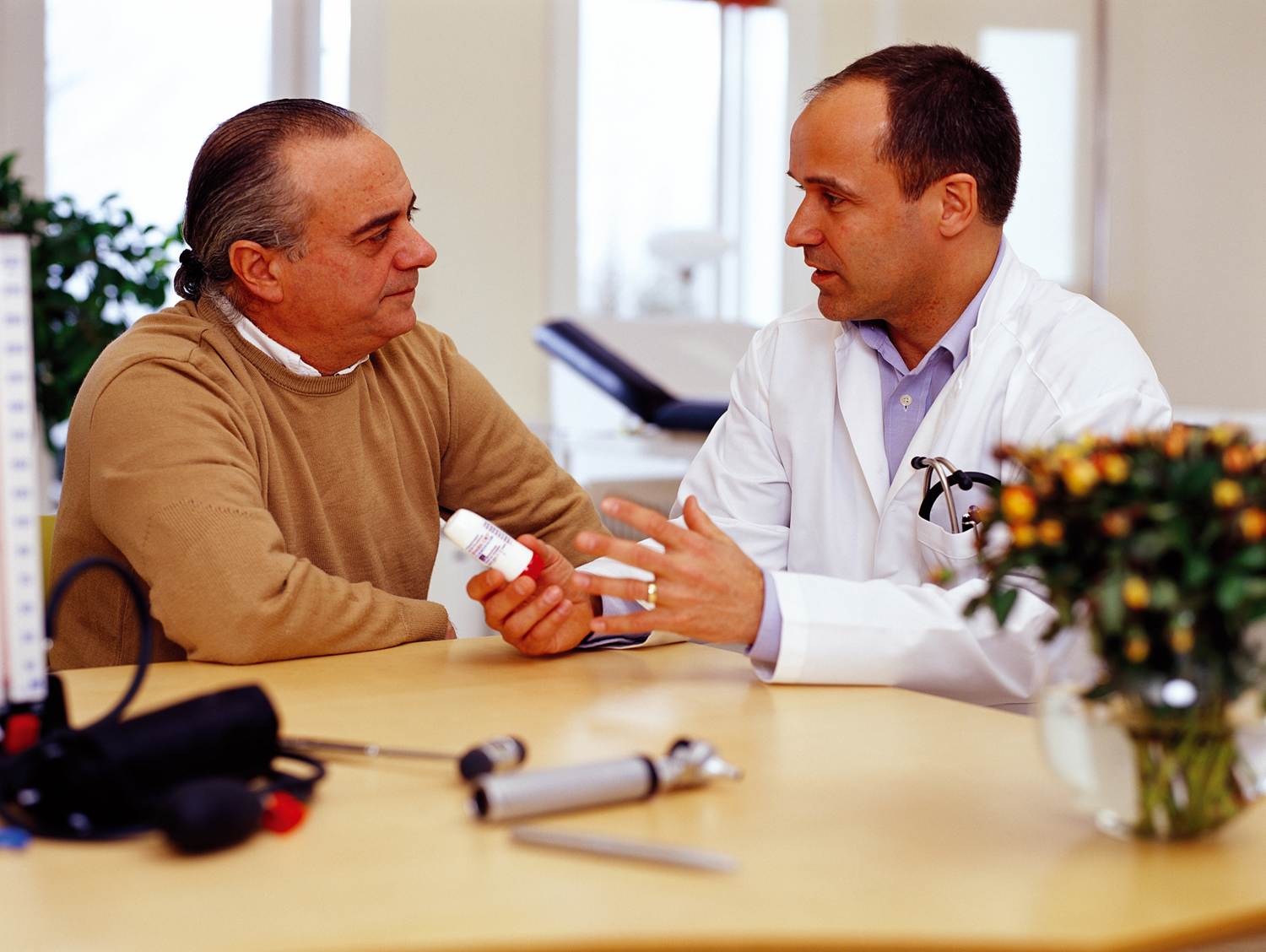
Conversation between doctor and patient

Medicalization, a concept in medical sociology, is the process by which human conditions and problems come to be defined and treated as medical conditions, and thus become the subject of medical study, diagnosis, prevention, or treatment. Medicalization can be driven by new evidence or hypotheses about conditions, by changing social attitudes or economic considerations, or by the development of new medications or treatments.

For many years, several psychiatrists, such as David Rosenhan, Peter Breggin, Paula Caplan, Thomas Szasz, Giorgio Antonucci and critics outside the field of psychiatry, such as Stuart A. Kirk, have "been accusing psychiatry of engaging in the systematic medicalization of normality". More recently these concerns have come from insiders who have worked for the APA themselves (e.g., Robert Spitzer, Allen Frances). For example, in 2013, Allen Frances said that "psychiatric diagnosis still relies exclusively on fallible subjective judgments rather than objective biological tests".

The concept of medicalization was devised by sociologists to explain how medical knowledge is applied to behaviors which are not self-evidently medical or biological. The term medicalization entered the sociology literature in the 1970s in the works of Irving Zola, Peter Conrad, and Thomas Szasz, among others. These sociologists viewed medicalization as a form of social control in which medical authority expanded into domains of everyday existence, and they rejected medicalization in the name of liberation. This critique was embodied in works such as Conrad's "The discovery of hyperkinesis: notes on medicalization of deviance", published in 1973 (hyperkinesis was the term then used to describe what we might now call ADHD), and Szasz's "The Myth of Mental Illness."

These sociologists did not believe medicalization to be a new phenomenon, arguing that medical authorities had always been concerned with social behavior and traditionally functioned as agents of social control (Foucault, 1965; Szasz, 1970; Rosen). However, these authors took the view that increasingly sophisticated technology had extended the potential reach of medicalization as a form of social control, especially in terms of "psychotechnology" (Chorover, 1973).

In the 1975 book Limits to medicine: Medical nemesis (1975), Ivan Illich put forth one of the earliest uses of the term "medicalization". Illich, a philosopher, argued that the medical profession harms people through iatrogenesis, a process in which illness and social problems increase due to medical intervention. Illich saw iatrogenesis occurring on three levels: the clinical, involving serious side effects worse than the original condition; the social, whereby the general public is made docile and reliant on the medical profession to cope with life in their society; and the structural, whereby the idea of aging and dying as medical illnesses effectively "medicalized" human life and left individuals and societies less able to deal with these natural processes.

Marxists such as Vicente Navarro (1980) linked medicalization to an oppressive capitalist society. They argued that medicine disguised the underlying causes of disease, such as social inequality and poverty, and instead presented health as an individual issue. Others examined the power and prestige of the medical profession, including use of terminology to mystify and of professional rules to exclude or subordinate others.

Some argue that in practice the process of medicalization tends to strip subjects of their social context, so they come to be understood in terms of the prevailing biomedical ideology, resulting in a disregard for overarching social causes such as unequal distribution of power and resources. A series of publications by Mens Sana Monographs have focused on medicine as a corporate capitalist enterprise.

== Political abuse ==
In unstable countries, political prisoners are sometimes confined and abused in mental institutions. The diagnosis of mental illness allows the state to hold persons against their will and insist upon therapy in their interest and in the broader interests of society. In addition, receiving a psychiatric diagnosis can in and of itself be regarded as oppressive. In a monolithic state, psychiatry can be used to bypass standard legal procedures for establishing guilt or innocence and allow political incarceration without the ordinary odium attaching to such political trials. The use of hospitals instead of jails prevents the victims from receiving legal aid before the courts, makes indefinite incarceration possible, and discredits the individuals and their ideas. In that manner, whenever open trials are undesirable, they are avoided.

Examples of political abuse of the power, entrusted in physicians and particularly psychiatrists, are abundant in history and seen during the Nazi era and the Soviet rule when political dissenters were labeled as "mentally ill" and subjected to inhumane "treatments." In the period from the 1960s up to 1986, abuse of psychiatry for political purposes was reported to be systematic in the Soviet Union, and occasional in other Eastern European countries such as Romania, Hungary, Czechoslovakia, and Yugoslavia. The practice of incarceration of political dissidents in mental hospitals in Eastern Europe and the former USSR damaged the credibility of psychiatric practice in these states and entailed strong condemnation from the international community. Political abuse of psychiatry also takes place in the People's Republic of China and in Russia. Psychiatric diagnoses such as the diagnosis of 'sluggish schizophrenia' in political dissidents in the USSR were used for political purposes.

== History of racism in psychiatry in the United States ==
The history of racism in psychiatry dates back to the days of slavery and segregation in the United States. Such racism in psychiatry exemplifies the concept of scientific racism, which falsely alleges that science and other empirical evidence supports racism and proves certain racial inferiorities.

=== Diagnosis ===
Psychiatric diagnoses were influenced by Black people's status as free or enslaved. Enslaved people were not considered civilized enough to be diagnosed with insanity, while free Black people were over-diagnosed with insanity, having much higher diagnosis rates than white people. Specific diagnoses in the 19th century were crafted specifically to fit Black people – drapetomania and dysesthesia aethiopica, disorders meant to explain why slaves ran away and why they were lazy or lacked a strong work ethic, respectively, and justify the institution of slavery. Prominent political figures such as John C. Calhoun used this supposed evidence to argue for slavery, arguing that free Black people could not be entrusted with their lives and would ultimately develop lunacy. All in all, throughout the 19th century, psychiatric diagnoses and scientifically racist theories were used to medicalize Blackness and uphold systems of slavery and racism, further constraining the rights, freedom, and humanity of Black people.

=== Scientific racism ===
Proponents of scientific racism have historically attempted to "prove" that Black people are physiologically and cognitively inferior to white people based on faulty assumptions and prejudices. Perpetuated by the inaccurate application of biodeterminism, specialists in neuroanatomy and psychiatry compared disproportionate numbers of brains from Black and white individuals to support their racial agendas based on "science."

=== Compulsory sterilization ===
The proportion of Black individuals confined in establishments for "flawed and imbecile" patients increased throughout the late 19th and early 20th century. Psychiatry contributed towards the inaccurate and racist belief that if they were left to their respective means, they would not be able to remain in decent condition. At the beginning of the 20th century, Black people were disproportionally sterilized in eugenics programs that compulsorarily sterilized those classed as feebleminded or who received welfare payments. The premise that the genes of those deemed mentally ill were undesirable was used to justify sterilization which was frequently supervised by physicians, including psychiatrists.

=== Hospitals ===
Segregation within mental institutions and hospitals is another example of the history of racism within psychiatry. Many psychiatric hospitals in the 19th century either excluded or segregated Black patients or admitted Black slaves to work at the hospital in exchange for care. The founding fathers of psychiatry themselves supported the notion that Black people were inferior, lower class citizens that must be treated separately and differently from white patients. With time, racial segregation within hospitals became interspersed with entirely separate hospitals for white and Black patients, each with differential treatment and quality of care. Political figures in the post-Civil War era argued that emancipation had led to a significant increase in insanity cases amongst Black individuals, and they cited the need to accommodate this increase via segregated and Black-only insane asylums. Many hospitals, especially in the southern United States, did not admit Black patients until they were eventually mandated to do so. The last segregated hospital opened in 1933. Popular arguments also circulated that Black patients were more difficult to take care of in mental institutions, making psychiatric care for them more difficult and justifying the need for segregated facilities.

Until the late 1960s, many hospitals remained segregated. This affected the experiences of racial minorities accessing psychiatric care in mental institutions and hospitals in the United States. When Lyndon B. Johnson's administration stated that no segregated hospital would receive federal Medicare funds, hospitals began to integrate quickly in order to be able to continue to access such funding. In January 1966, around two-thirds of Southern hospitals were segregated facilities and many Northern facilities remain segregated in-effect. One year later, by January 1967, there were very few hospitals in the United States that remained segregated. Segregation within mental institutions and hospitals is one example of the history of racism within psychiatry.

=== In the profession ===
Black psychiatrists often experienced racism as practitioners within the field. Some of this history is detailed in Jeanne Spurlock's book titled Black Psychiatrists and American Psychiatry, published in 1999, in which she profiles Black psychiatrists who were influential in American psychiatry and their experiences in the profession. During the Civil Rights Movement, Black psychiatrists expressed concerns to the APA that the needs of Black communities and Black psychiatrists were being ignored by the professional organization. In 1969, a contingent of Black psychiatrists presented a list of 9 concerns to the APA Board of Trustees regarding experiences of structural racism in the field. Their '9 points' represented a wide array of experiences of discrimination, both from the experiences of practitioners and patients, and on the institutional and individual level and the group demanded change from within the APA. For example, they called for more Black leaders on APA committees as well as the desegregation of all mental health facilities, both public and private, in the United States.

As of 2020, within psychiatry, historically underrepresented groups continue to be less represented as residents, faculty, and practicing physicians in comparison to their proportion in the U.S. population.

== Nature of diagnosis ==
=== Arbitrariness ===
Psychiatry has been criticized for its broad range of mental diseases and disorders. Which diagnoses exist and are considered valid have changed over time depending on society's norms. Homosexuality was considered a mental illness but due to changing attitudes, it is no longer recognised as an illness. Historic disorders that are no longer recognised include orthorexia nervosa, sexual addiction, parental alienation syndrome, pathological demand avoidance, and Internet addiction disorder. New disorders include compulsive hoarding and binge eating disorder.

The act of diagnosis itself has been criticized for being arbitrary with some conditions being overdiagnosed. Individuals may be diagnosed with a mental disorder despite having been perceived as having no issues with their behavior. In Virginia, U.S., it was found up to 33% of white boys are diagnosed with ADHD leading to alarm in the medical community.

Thomas Szasz argued that mental health diagnoses were used as a form of labelling violations of societies norms. Bill Fullford, introduced the idea of "value-laden" mental health diagnosis with mental health lying between physical health and a moral judgment. Under this system personality disorders are seen as not very factual and very value-laden while delirium is quite factual and not very value-laden.

=== Biological basis ===
In 2013, psychiatrist Allen Frances said that he believes that "psychiatric diagnosis still relies exclusively on fallible subjective judgments rather than objective biological tests".

Mary Boyle argues that psychiatry is actually the study of behavior, but acts as if it is the study of the brain based on a presumed connection between patterns of behavior and the biological function of the brain. She argues that in the case of schizophrenia it is the bizarre behavior of individuals that justifies the presumption of a biological cause for this behavior rather than the existence of any evidence.

She argues that the concept of schizophrenia and its biological basis serves a social function for psychiatrists. She views the concept of schizophrenia as necessary for psychiatry to be considered as a medical field, that the claimed biological link gives psychiatrists protection from accusations of social control, and that the belief in the biological basis for schizophrenia is maintained through secondary source's misrepresentation of underlying data. She argues that schizophrenia and its biological basis also gives families, psychiatrists and society as a whole the ability to avoid blame for the damage they cause individuals and the ineffectiveness of treatment.

=== Schizophrenia diagnosis ===
Underlying issues associated with schizophrenia may be better addressed as a spectrum of conditions or as individual dimensions along which everyone varies rather than by a diagnostic category based on an arbitrary cut-off between normal and ill. This approach appears consistent with research on schizotypy, and with a relatively high prevalence of psychotic experiences, mostly non-distressing delusional beliefs, among the general public. In concordance with this observation, psychologist Edgar Jones, and psychiatrists Tony David and Nassir Ghaemi, surveying the existing literature on delusions, pointed out that the consistency and completeness of the definition of delusion have been found wanting by many; delusions are neither necessarily fixed nor false, and need not involve the presence of incontrovertible evidence.

Nancy Andreasen has criticized the current DSM-IV and ICD-10 criteria for sacrificing diagnostic validity for the sake of artificially improving reliability. She argues that overemphasis on psychosis in the diagnostic criteria, while improving diagnostic reliability, ignores more fundamental cognitive impairments that are harder to assess due to large variations in presentation. This view is supported by other psychiatrists. In the same vein, Ming Tsuang and colleagues argue that psychotic symptoms may be a common end-state in a variety of disorders, including schizophrenia, rather than a reflection of the specific etiology of schizophrenia, and warn that there is little basis for regarding DSM's operational definition as the "true" construct of schizophrenia. Neuropsychologist Michael Foster Green went further in suggesting the presence of specific neurocognitive deficits may be used to construct phenotypes that are alternatives to those that are purely symptom-based. These deficits take the form of a reduction or impairment in basic psychological functions such as memory, attention, executive function and problem solving.

The exclusion of affective components from the criteria for schizophrenia, despite their ubiquity in clinical settings, has also caused contention. This exclusion in the DSM has resulted in a "rather convoluted" separate disorder—schizoaffective disorder. Citing poor interrater reliability, some psychiatrists have totally contested the concept of schizoaffective disorder as a separate entity. The categorical distinction between mood disorders and schizophrenia, known as the Kraepelinian dichotomy, has also been challenged by data from genetic epidemiology.

Jonathan Metzl, in his book The Protest Psychosis, argues that the Ionia State Hospital in Ionia, Michigan disproportionately diagnosed African Americans with schizophrenia because of their civil rights activism.

=== ADHD ===
ADHD, its diagnosis, and its treatment have been controversial since the 1970s. The controversies involve clinicians, teachers, policymakers, parents, and the media. Positions range from the view that ADHD is within the normal range of behavior to the hypothesis that ADHD is a genetic condition. Other areas of controversy include the use of stimulant medications in children, the method of diagnosis, and the possibility of overdiagnosis. In 2012, the National Institute for Health and Care Excellence, while acknowledging the controversy, states that the current treatments and methods of diagnosis are based on the dominant view of the academic literature. In 2014, Keith Conners, one of the early advocates for recognition of the disorder, spoke out against overdiagnosis in an article in The New York Times. In contrast, a 2014 peer-reviewed medical literature review indicated that ADHD is underdiagnosed in adults.

With widely differing rates of diagnosis across countries, states within countries, races, and ethnicities, some suspect factors other than the presence of the symptoms of ADHD are playing a role in diagnosis. Some sociologists consider ADHD to be an example of the medicalization of deviant behavior, that is, the turning of the previously non-medical issue of school performance into a medical one. Most healthcare providers accept ADHD as a genuine disorder, at least in the small number of people with severe symptoms. Among healthcare providers the debate mainly centers on diagnosis and treatment in the much larger number of people with less severe symptoms.

As of 2009, 8% of all United States Major League Baseball players had been diagnosed with ADHD, making the disorder common among this population. The increase coincided with the League's 2006 ban on stimulants, which has raised concern that some players are mimicking or falsifying the symptoms or history of ADHD to get around the ban on the use of stimulants in sport.

== Treatment ==
=== Psychosurgery ===
Psychosurgery is brain surgery with the aim of changing an individual's behavior or psychological function. Historically, this was achieved through ablative psychosurgery that removed or deliberately damaged (lesioning) a section of the brain, but more recently deep brain stimulation is used to remotely stimulate sections of the brain.

One such practice was the lobotomy, that was used between the 1930s and 1950s, for which one its creators, António Egas Moniz, received a Nobel Prize in 1949. The lobotomy fell out of favor in by 1960s and 1970s. Other forms of ablative psychosurgery were in use in the UK in the late 1970s to treat psychotic and mood disorders. Bilateral cingulotomy was used to treat substance abuse disorder in Russia until 2002. Deep brain stimulation is used in China to treat substance abuse disorders.

In the US, the lobotomy, while initially received with positivity in the late 1930s, came to be seen more negative in the late 1940s and early 1950s. The New York Times discussed the personality changes of lobotomy in 1947, and in the same year the Science Digest reported on papers questioning the effects of lobotomy on personality and intelligence. The lobotomy was prominently depicted a means to control nonconformity in the 1962 book One Flew Over the Cuckoo's Nest.

Psychosurgery was criticized in the US in the late 1960s and 1970s by psychiatrist Peter Breggin. He identified all psychosurgery with the lobotomy as a rhetorical device to criticize the practice of psychosurgery more broadly. He stated that "psychosurgery is a crime against humanity, a crime that cannot be condoned on medical, ethical, or legal grounds". Psycho-surgeons William Beecher Scoville and Petter Lindström said that Breggin's critique was emotional and not based on facts.

Psychosurgery was investigated by the US Senate in the 1973 by the Health Subcommittee of the Senate's Committee on Labor and Public Welfare chaired by Senator Edward Kennedy due to growing concern about the ethical boundaries of science and medicine. At this committee Breggin argued that newer forms of psychosurgery were the same as the lobotomy since it had the same effects "emotional blunting, passivity, reduced capacity to learn" and said that psycho-surgeons "represent the greatest future threat that we are going to face for our traditional American values", arguing that if the US became a totalitarian regime lobotomy and psychosurgery would be the equivalent of the secret police. The subcommittee published a report in 1977 suggesting that data should be carefully collected about psychosurgery and that it should not be performed upon children or prisoners.

=== Electroconvulsive therapy ===
Electroconvulsive therapy is a therapy method which was used widely between the 1930s and 1960s and is, in a modified form, still used today. Electroconvulsive therapy was one treatment that the anti-psychiatry movement wanted to be eliminated from psychiatric practice. Their arguments were that ECT damages the brain, and was used as punishment or as a threat to keep the patients "in line". Since then, ECT has improved considerably, and is now performed under general anesthesia in a medically supervised environment.

The National Institute for Health and Care Excellence recommends ECT for the short-term treatment of severe, treatment-resistant depression, and advises against its use as a first line treatment for schizophrenia. ECT has shown to be up to 70% effective for treatment resistant schizophrenia, and ECT has been shown to be particularly helpful for cases with prominent catatonic symptoms. According to the Canadian Network for Mood and Anxiety Treatments, ECT is more efficacious for the treatment of depression than antidepressants, with a response rate of 90% in first line treatment and 50-60% in treatment-resistant patients.

The most common side effects of ECT include headache, muscle soreness, confusion, and temporary loss of recent memory. Patients may also experience permanent amnesia.

== Marketing of antipsychotic drugs ==
Psychiatry has greatly benefitted by advances in pharmacotherapy. However, the close relationship between those prescribing psychiatric medication and pharmaceutical companies, and the risk of a conflict of interest, is also a source of concern. This relationship is often described as being part of the medical-industrial complex. This marketing by the pharmaceutical industry has an influence on practicing psychiatrists, which affects prescription. Child psychiatry is one of the areas in which prescription of psychotropic medication has grown massively. In the past, prescription of these medications for children was rare, but nowadays child psychiatrists prescribe psychotropic substances, such as Ritalin, on a regular basis to children.

Joanna Moncrieff has argued that antipsychotic drug treatment is often undertaken as a means of control rather than to treat specific symptoms experienced by the patient. Moncrieff has further argued, in the controversial and non-peer reviewed journal Medical Hypotheses, that the evidence for antipsychotics from discontinuation-relapse studies may be flawed, because they do not take into account that antipsychotics may sensitize the brain and provoke psychosis if discontinued, which may then be wrongly interpreted as a relapse of the original condition.

Use of this class of drugs has a history of criticism in residential care. As the drugs used can make patients calmer and more compliant, critics claim that the drugs can be overused. Outside doctors can feel pressure from care home staff. In an official review commissioned by UK government ministers it was reported that the needless use of antipsychotic medication in dementia care was widespread and was linked to 1800 deaths per year. In the US, the government has initiated legal action against the pharmaceutical company Johnson & Johnson for allegedly paying kickbacks to Omnicare to promote its antipsychotic risperidone (Risperdal) in nursing homes.

There has also been controversy about the role of pharmaceutical companies in marketing and promoting antipsychotics, including allegations of downplaying or covering up adverse effects, expanding the number of conditions or illegally promoting off-label usage; influencing drug trials (or their publication) to try to show that the expensive and profitable newer atypicals were superior to the older cheaper typicals that were out of patent. Following charges of illegal marketing, settlements by two large pharmaceutical companies in the US set records for the largest criminal fines ever imposed on corporations. One case involved Eli Lilly and Company's antipsychotic Zyprexa, and the other involved Bextra. In the Bextra case, the government also charged Pfizer with illegally marketing another antipsychotic, Geodon. In addition, Astrazeneca faces numerous personal-injury lawsuits from former users of Seroquel (quetiapine), amidst federal investigations of its marketing practices. By expanding the conditions for which they were indicated, Astrazeneca's Seroquel and Eli Lilly's Zyprexa had become the biggest selling antipsychotics in 2008 with global sales of $5.5 billion and $5.4 billion respectively.

Harvard medical professor Joseph Biederman conducted research on bipolar disorder in children that led to an increase in such diagnoses. A 2008 Senate investigation found that Biederman also received $1.6 million in speaking and consulting fees between 2000 and 2007— some of them undisclosed to Harvard— from companies including the makers of antipsychotic drugs prescribed for children with bipolar disorder. Johnson & Johnson gave more than $700,000 to a research center that was headed by Biederman from 2002 to 2005, where research was conducted, in part, on Risperdal, the company's antipsychotic drug. Biederman has responded saying that the money did not influence him and that he did not promote a specific diagnosis or treatment.

In 2004, University of Minnesota research participant Dan Markingson committed suicide while enrolled in an industry-sponsored pharmaceutical trial comparing three FDA-approved atypical antipsychotics: Seroquel (quetiapine), Zyprexa (olanzapine), and Risperdal (risperidone). Writing on the circumstances surrounding Markingson's death in the study, which was designed and funded by Seroquel manufacturer AstraZeneca, University of Minnesota Professor of Bioethics Carl Elliott noted that Markingson was enrolled in the study against the wishes of his mother, Mary Weiss, and that he was forced to choose between enrolling in the study or being involuntarily committed to a state mental institution. Further investigation revealed financial ties to AstraZeneca by Markingson's psychiatrist, Dr. Stephen C. Olson, oversights and biases in AstraZeneca's trial design, and the inadequacy of university Institutional Review Board (IRB) protections for research subjects. A 2005 FDA investigation cleared the university. Nonetheless, controversy around the case has continued. Mother Jones resulted in a group of university faculty members sending a public letter to the university Board of Regents urging an external investigation into Markingson's death.

Pharmaceutical companies have also been accused of attempting to set the mental health agenda through activities such as funding consumer advocacy groups.

In an effort to reduce the potential for hidden conflicts of interest between researchers and pharmaceutical companies, the US Government issued a mandate in 2012 requiring that drug manufacturers receiving funds under the Medicare and Medicaid programs collect data, and make public, all gifts to doctors and hospitals.

== Anti-psychiatry ==
The term anti-psychiatry was coined by psychiatrist David Cooper in 1967 and is understood in current psychiatry to mean opposition to psychiatry's perceived role aspects of treatment. The anti-psychiatry message is that psychiatric treatments are "ultimately more damaging than helpful to patients". Psychiatry is seen to involve an "unequal power relationship between doctor and patient", and advocates of anti-psychiatry claim a subjective diagnostic process, leaving much room for opinions and interpretations. Every society, including liberal Western society, permits compulsory treatment of mental patients. The World Health Organization (WHO) recognizes that "poor quality services and human rights violations in mental health and social care facilities are still an everyday occurrence in many places", but has recently taken steps to improve the situation globally.

Electroconvulsive therapy is a therapy method, which was used widely between the 1930s and 1960s and is, in a modified form, still in use today. Valium and other sedatives have arguably been over-prescribed, leading to a claimed epidemic of dependence. These are a few of the arguments that the anti-psychiatry movement use to highlight the harms of psychiatric practice.

Multiple authors are well known for the movement against psychiatry, including those who have been practicing psychiatrists. The most influential was R.D. Laing, who wrote a series of books, including; The Divided Self. Thomas Szasz rose to fame with the book The Myth of Mental Illness. Michel Foucault challenged the very basis of psychiatric practice and cast it as repressive and controlling. The term "anti-psychiatry" itself was coined by David Cooper in 1967. The founder of the non-psychiatric approach to psychological suffering is Giorgio Antonucci.

Divergence within psychiatry generated the anti-psychiatry movement in the 1960s and 1970s, and is still present. Issues remaining relevant in contemporary psychiatry are questions of; freedom versus coercion, mind versus brain, nature versus nurture, and the right to be different.

== Psychiatric survivors movement ==
The psychiatric survivors movement arose out of the civil rights ferment of the late 1960s and early 1970s and the personal histories of psychiatric abuse experienced by some ex-patients rather than the intradisciplinary discourse of antipsychiatry. The key text in the intellectual development of the survivor movement, at least in the US, was Judi Chamberlin's 1978 text, On Our Own: Patient Controlled Alternatives to the Mental Health System. Chamberlin was an ex-patient and co-founder of the Mental Patients' Liberation Front. Coalescing around the ex-patient newsletter Dendron, in late 1988 leaders from several of the main national and grassroots psychiatric survivor groups felt that an independent, human rights coalition focused on problems in the mental health system was needed. That year the Support Coalition International (SCI) was formed. SCI's first public action was to stage a counter-conference and protest in New York City, in May, 1990, at the same time as (and directly outside of) the American Psychiatric Association's annual meeting. In 2005 the SCI changed its name to Mind Freedom International with David W. Oaks as its director.
