= Mad in America (website) =

Psychiatry webzine

- Available in: English
- Founded: 2012
- Headquarters: Cambridge, Massachusetts, {{{location_country}}}
- Website: Mad in America

Mad in America is a webzine dedicated to critical perspectives on modern psychiatry. It was founded in 2012 by Robert Whitaker, who also publishes the site. Whitaker founded the Mad in America website in response to the positive reactions to his books Mad in America and Anatomy of an Epidemic. Its mission statement originally stated,

Mad in America’s mission is to serve as a catalyst for rethinking psychiatric care in the United States (and abroad). We believe that the current drug-based paradigm of care has failed our society, and that scientific research, as well as the lived experience of those who have been diagnosed with a psychiatric disorder, calls for profound change.

The site has been described as "one important umbrella site for critical engagements with psychiatry" and an example of "active groups and actors with a history of providing robust commentary on the DSM" by Martyn Pickersgill in the Journal of Medical Ethics.
