= Side Effects (Bass book) =

2008 book by Alison Bass

- Author: Alison Bass
- Language: English
- Series: 1
- Subject: Pharmaceutical industry; Corporate law; psychopharmacology; FDA; Mental health
- Genre: Non-fiction
- Publisher: Algonquin Books of Chapel Hill
- Publication date: June 17, 2008
- Media type: Hardcover
- Pages: 260
- ISBN: 978-1-565-12553-7
- LC Class: KF228.S685B37 2008

Side Effects: A Prosecutor, a Whistleblower, and a Bestselling Antidepressant on Trial is a nonfiction book by investigative journalist Alison Bass that chronicles the lawsuit filed in 2004 against GlaxoSmithKline by then New York Attorney General Eliot Spitzer.

Also examined is how Donna Howard, a former assistant administrator for Brown University’s department of Psychiatry, exposed deception in the research and marketing of Paxil, an antidepressant prescribed to millions of children and adults. The book shows the connections between pharmaceutical giant GlaxoSmithKline (the maker of Paxil), a top Ivy League research institution, and the government agency designed to protect the public – conflicted relationships that may have compromised the health and safety of vulnerable children.

Side Effects also explores the controversy over drugs used to treat clinical depression, with a special focus on Paxil, Prozac and Zoloft. The book provides evidence of medical researchers "skewing results on behalf of pharmaceutical companies" that pay for the studies; pharmaceutical companies "marketing medicines without adequately disclosing adverse impacts;" and government agencies "unable or unwilling to adequately protect consumers," who sometimes die as a result.

== Award ==
Side Effects received the NASW Science in Society Award for 2009. In making the announcement, one of the judges said, that Bass's book "led to changes in policy in many areas of public health, not only nationally but internationally."

== See also ==
- Anatomy of an Epidemic (2010) by Robert Whitaker
- Bad Pharma (2012) by Ben Goldacre
- Big Pharma (2006) by Jacky Law
- Ethics in pharmaceutical sales
- Lists about the pharmaceutical industry
- Pharmaceutical fraud
- Pharmaceutical lobby
- Pharmaceutical marketing
