= Science in Society Journalism Awards =

Award

The Science in Society Journalism Awards have been presented annually by the American National Association of Science Writers (NASW) since 1972 to recognize "...investigative or interpretive reporting about the sciences and their impact on modern society". Over the years, the particular categories for which they have awarded prizes has evolved, and in their words, they "seek to recognize science writing that is shaped by a variety of perspectives".

== Past recipients ==
=== 2024 ===
- Books: Pitfall: The Race to Mine the World's Most Vulnerable Places by Christopher Pollon (Greystone Books)
- Science Reporting: "Should beetles be named after Adolf Hitler?" by Rodrigo Pérez Ortega, published by Science magazine
- Science Features: "In the Lab Oppenheimer Built, the U.S. Is Building Nuclear Bomb Cores Again" by W.J. Hennigan, published by TIME magazine
- Longform Narratives: "The Mining Industry's Next Frontier Is Deep, Deep Under the Sea" by Vince Beiser, published in WIRED
- Series: "Bleeding Out" by Lauren Caruba and Ari Sen, co-published by The Dallas Morning News and the San Antonio Express-News
- Commentary: "I Worked in Antarctica for Three Years. My Sexual Harasser Was Never Caught" by Elizabeth Endicott, published in Scientific American

=== 2023 ===
- Books: When Children Feel Pain: From Everyday Aches to Chronic Conditions by Rachel Rabkin Peachman and Anna C. Wilson (Harvard University Press)
- Science Reporting: "How Indigenous Sea Gardens Produced Massive Amounts of Food for Millennia" by Ashley Braun, published by Hakai Magazine
- Science Features: "Thousands of Migrant Workers Died in Qatar's Extreme Heat. The World Cup Forced a Reckoning" by Aryn Baker, published by Time
- Longform Narratives: "A Field at a Crossroads: Genetics and Racial Mythmaking" by Ashley Smart, published by Undark Magazine
- Series: "Fighting for Air" by Talis Shelbourne, published by the Milwaukee Journal Sentinel
- Commentary: "We Can Fight Monkeypox Without Hysteria or Homophobia" by Kai Kupferschmidt, published by The New York Times

=== 2022 ===
- Books: Wild Souls: Freedom and Flourishing in the Non-Human World, by Emma Marris (Bloomsbury Publishing)
- Science Reporting: "How Heat Waves Warp Ecosystems" by Julia Rosen, published by High Country News
- Science Features: "Brazil Shows You Can Harvest Sugar Cane Without Polluting the Air: What Florida's Sugar Farmers Can Learn About Burning Cane" by Nadia Sussman (reporting and production, cinematography), Joseph Singer (video editing), Mauricio Rodríguez Pons (graphics and animation), Letícia Klein (additional reporting, production assistance), with Lulu Ramadan (additional reporting) and Kevina Tidwell (archival producer), and executive producer Almudena Toral and series editor Michael Mishak, co-produced by WGCU and ProPublica
- Longform Narratives: "The Pain Was Unbearable, So Why Did Doctors Turn Her Away?" by Maia Szalavitz, published by WIRED
- Series: "Unsalvageable: Preventable Amputations Rise During COVID" by Eli Cahan, published by WebMD/Medscape
- Commentary: "Why are Police Using a World War I-Era Chemical Weapon on Civilians?" by Jennifer L. Brown, Roman Tyshynsky, Timothy Monko, Carlee Toddes, and Carey Lyons, published by Scientific American

=== 2021 ===
- Books: What Can a Body Do? How We Meet the Built World by Sara Hendren (Riverhead Books)
- Science Reporting: "How to Dodge the Sonic Weapon Used by Police" by Lynne Peskoe-Yang, published in Popular Mechanics
- Science Features: "In Collecting Indigenous Feces, a Slew of Sticky Ethics" by Katherine J. Wu, published by Undark Magazine
- Longform: "America's Radioactive Secret" by Justin Nobel, published by Rolling Stone
- Series: "Where Will Everyone Go? How Climate Refugees Might Move Across International Borders" by Abrahm Lustgarten, Meridith Kohut, Sergey Ponomarev, Al Shaw, and Lucas Waldron, published by ProPublica and The New York Times Magazine

=== 2020 ===
External videos
- Presentation by Katherine Eban on Bottle of Lies, September 26, 2020, C-SPAN

- Book: Katherine Eban for her book Bottle of Lies: The Inside Story of the Generic Drug Boom (Ecco/HarperCollins)
- Science Reporting: "Cigarette Butts Are Everywhere. Is Banning Filters a Viable Solution?" by Robin Kazmier published in Audubon
- Science Features: "The Confession: A psychologist has shown how police questioning can get innocent people to condemn themselves" by Douglas Starr, published in Science Magazine
- Longform: "The Final Five Percent" by Tim Requarth, published in Longreads
- Series: "Polluter's Paradise" by Tristan Baurick, Joan Meiners, Claire Perlman, Gordon Russell, Sara Sneath, Mark Schleifstein, Al Shaw, and Lylla Younes, published by ProPublica and The Advocate

=== 2019 ===
External videos
- Presentation by Carl Zimmer on She Has Her Mother's Laugh, June 20, 2018, C-SPAN

- Book: Carl Zimmer for his book She Has Her Mother's Laugh: The Powers, Perversions and Potentials of Heredity (Dutton)
- Science Reporting: "In the Land of Quakes, Engineering a Future for a Church Made of Mud" by Michelle Donahue published in The New York Times
- Science Features: "Scientists think Alabama's sewage problem has caused a tropical parasite. The state has done little about it" by Arielle Duhaime-Ross, published in VICE News
- Longform: "Surrendering to Rising Sea" by Jen Schwartz, published in Scientific American
- Series: "Poisoned Cities, Deadly Border" by Ian James and Zoë Meyers in The Desert Sun

=== 2018 ===
- Book: Maryn McKenna for her book Big Chicken: The Incredible Story of How Antibiotics Created Modern Agriculture and Changed the Way the World Eats (National Geographic)
- Science Reporting - Short category: "The Mystery of the Wasting House-Cats" by Emily Anthes, published in The New York Times Magazine
- Science Reporting - Medium category: "Accidental Therapists: For Insect Detectives, the Trickiest Cases Involve the Bugs That Aren't Really There" by Eric Boodman, published in STAT
- Science Reporting - Long category: "The Detective of Northern Oddities" by Christopher Solomon, published in Outside
- Science Reporting - Series: "United States of Climate Change", by the United States of Climate Change Reporting Team, published by The Weather Channel Digital
- Local or Regional Science Reporting: "Doomed by Delay" by Patricia Callahan, published in Chicago Tribune

=== 2017 ===
- Book: Emily Voigt for her book The Dragon Behind the Glass: A True Story of Power, Obsession, and the World's Most Coveted Fish (Scribner)
- Science Reporting: "Science for Sale" by David Heath and Jie Jenny Zou, published in Center for Public Integrity
- Longform: "Choking to Death in Detroit" by Zoë Schlanger, published in Newsweek
- Local or Regional Science Reporting: "When the Dust Settles" by Eva Hershaw, published in Texas Monthly
- Commentary or Opinion: "Not Just a Death, a System Failure", by Barbara Moran published in The New York Times

=== 2016 ===
- Book: Andrew Nikiforuk for his book Slick Water: Fracking and One Insider's Stand Against the World's Most Powerful Industry (Greystone Books)
- Science Reporting: "How the Fight Against Ebola Tested a Culture's Traditions" by Amy Maxmen, published in National Geographic
- Longform: "Bees, Inc." by Josh Dzieza, published in Pacific Standard
- Local or Regional Science Reporting: "Leaving the Sea: Staten Islanders Experiment with Managed Retreat" by Elizabeth Rush, published in Urban Omnibus
- Commentary or Opinion: "Handle with Care" by Emma Marris, published in Orion Magazine

=== 2015 ===
- Book: Judy Foreman for her book A Nation in Pain: Healing Our Biggest Health Problem (Oxford University Press)
- Science Reporting: "Why Nothing Works" by Erik Vance, published in Discover
- Longform: "Big Oil, Bad Air" by Lisa Song, David Hasemyer, Jim Morris, Greg Gilderman, and more than a dozen other colleagues, published in InsideClimate News
- Local or Regional Science Reporting: "Battle of the Ash Borer" by Matthew Miller, published in the Lansing State Journal
- Commentary or Opinion: No award was given

=== 2014 ===
External videos
- Presentation by Sheri Fink on Five Days at Memorial, October 15, 2013, C-SPAN
- Interview with Fink on Five Days at Memorial, November 22, 2013, C-SPAN

- Book: Sheri Fink for her book Five Days at Memorial: Life and Death in a Storm-Ravaged Hospital (Crown Publishing Group)
- Science Reporting: "A Race to Save the Orange by Altering Its DNA" by Amy Harmon, published in The New York Times
- Longform: "Uprising: The Environmental Scandal That's Happening Right Beneath Your Feet" by Phil McKenna, published in Matter
- Local or Regional Science Reporting: "The Tree Coroners" by Cally Carswell, published in High Country News
- Commentary or Opinion: "23andMe is Terrifying, but Not for the Reasons the FDA Thinks" by Charles Seife, published in Scientific American's SA Forum

=== 2013 ===
External videos
- Presentation by David Quammen on Spillover, October 12, 2012, C-SPAN

- Book: David Quammen for his book Spillover: Animal Infections and the Next Human Pandemic (W.W. Norton)
- Science Reporting: "Witness to an Antarctic Meltdown" by freelancer Douglas Fox, published in Scientific American
- Longform: "Playing with Fire" by Patricia Callahan, Sam Roe and Michael Hawthorne, published in the Chicago Tribune
- Local or Regional Science Reporting: "The Color of Bunny" by freelancer Hillary Rosner, published in High Country News
- Commentary or Opinion: "The Real Scandal" by freelancer Christie Aschwanden, posted on the blog The Last Word on Nothing

=== 2012 ===
External videos
- Presentation by Mnookin on The Panic Virus, January 27, 2011, C-SPAN

- Book: Seth Mnookin for his book Panic Virus: A True Story of Medicine, Science, and Fear (Simon & Schuster)
- Science Reporting: "Poisoned Places" by reporters from the Center for Public Integrity (Jim Morris, Chris Hamby, Ronnie Greene, Elizabeth Lucas, Emma Schwartz) and NPR (Elizabeth Shogren, Howard Berkes, Sandra Bartlett, John Poole, Robert Benincasa)
- Local or Regional Science Reporting: "Perilous Passages" by Emilene Ostlind, Mary Ellen Hannibal, and Cally Carswell, published in High Country News
- Commentary or Opinion: "Ban Chimp Testing" by the Scientific American Board of Editors, published in Scientific American

=== 2011 ===
- Book: Maryn McKenna for her book Superbug: The Fatal Menace of MRSA (Free Press)
- Science Reporting: Katy Butler for her New York Times Magazine article, "My Father's Broken Heart"
- Local or Regional Science Reporting: Barbara Moran for her Boston Globe Magazine article, "Power Politics"
- Commentary or Opinion: Charles Homans, for his Columbia Journalism Review article, "Hot Air"

=== 2010 ===
- Book: Susan Cohen and Christine Cosgrove for Normal at Any Cost: Tall Girls, Short Boys, and the Medical Industry's Quest to Manipulate Height (Tarcher/Penguin)
- Science Reporting: Martha Mendoza and Margie Mason won for their Associated Press series "When Drugs Stop Working"
- Science Reporting: Charles Duhigg won for his New York Times series "Toxic Waters"
- Local or Regional Science Reporting: J. Madeleine Nash for her article "Bring in the Cows", which appeared in High Country News

There was not an award in the Commentary or Opinion category in 2010.

=== 2009 ===
- Book: Alison Bass for her book Side Effects: A Prosecutor, a Whistleblower, and a Bestselling Antidepressant on Trial (Algonquin Books of Chapel Hill)
- Science Reporting: Jason Felch and Maura Dolan for their series in the Los Angeles Times, "Genes as Evidence"
- Local or Regional Science Reporting: Michael J. Berens and Ken Armstrong for their series in the Seattle Times, "Culture of Resistance"
- Commentary: Pamela Ronald for "The New Organic", which appeared on boston.com

=== 2008 ===
External videos
- Presentation by Beth Whitehouse on The Match: "Savior Siblings" and One Family's Battle to Heal Their Daughter (based on her Newsday series), April 8, 2010, C-SPAN

- Book: Liza Mundy for her book Everything Conceivable: How Assisted Reproduction Is Changing Men and Women and the World (Knopf)
- Magazine: Beth Whitehouse for her Newsday series "The Match"
- Broadcast: Stephen Lyons and Llewellyn M. Smith for their docudrama "Forgotten Genius", which appeared on PBS's NOVA television series.

=== 2007 ===
- Book: Nicholas Wade for Before the Dawn: Recovering the Lost History of Our Ancestors (Penguin Books)
- Broadcast: David Sington for his documentary "Dimming the Sun", which appeared on PBS's NOVA television series.
- Newspaper: Kenneth Weiss and Usha Lee McFarling for their Los Angeles Times series "Altered Oceans"

=== 2005 ===
External videos
- Washington Journal interview with Laurie Garrett on her Foreign Affairs articles on potential pandemics, August 4, 2005, C-SPAN

- Book: Robin Marantz Henig for Pandora's Baby: How the First Test-Tube Babies Sparked the Reproductive Revolution (Houghton Mifflin Harcourt)
- Broadcast: Craig Duff and Andrew Revkin for Arctic Rush, (a New York Times/ Discovery Channel/CBC Documentary)
- Magazine: Laurie Garrett for "The Next Pandemic" Foreign Affairs, July/August 2005
- Newspaper: Jim Erickson for "A Change in the Air" in Rocky Mountain News, December 13, 2005
- Web: Daniel Grossman for Fantastic Forests: The Balance Between Nature and People of Madagascar, WBUR

=== 2004 ===
- Book: Stephen S. Hall for Merchants of Immortality: Chasing the Dream of Human Life Extension, (Houghton Mifflin)
- Magazine: Robin Marantz Henig for "The Quest to Forget" in The New York Times Magazine
- Newspaper: Alexandra Witze and Tom Siegfried for the "Science's Big Unknown" series in The Dallas Morning News
- Broadcast: Noel Schwerin for Bloodlines: Technology Hits Home, Backbone Media

=== 2003 ===
- Book: Steve Olson for Mapping Human History: Genes, Race, and Our Common Origins, (Houghton Mifflin Harcourt)
- Magazine: Kyla Dunn for "Cloning Trevor" in The Atlantic Monthly
- Newspaper: Dan Fagin for the "Tattered Hopes" series in Newsday
- Radio: Joe Palca for the "Stem Cells" series, National Public Radio (NPR)
- Television: John Rubin for "Clone", MSNBC-National Geographic Explorer
- Woodbury, Margaret A. (July 24, 2002). "A Doctor's Right to Choose". Salon. Archived from the original on September 15, 2012. Salon.com

=== 2002 ===
- Book: Jon Cohen for Shots in the Dark: The Wayward Search for an AIDS Vaccine, (W.W. Norton & Co.)
- Magazine: Shannon Brownlee for "The Big Fat Question" in Self magazine
- Magazine: Charles W. Schmidt for "e-Junk Explosion" in Environmental Health Perspectives
- Newspaper: Rick Weiss for "Building a New Child: Embryo Screening Creates a Tool Against Disease — and Ethical Questions" in The Washington Post
- Radio: William S. Hammack for Engineering and Life, WILL-AM580 and Illinois Public Radio
- Television: Richard Hutton for Evolution, NOVA/WGBH-TV
- Web: Alan Boyle for "Genetic Genealogy", MSNBC

=== 2001 ===
- Book: David Dobbs for The Great Gulf: Fishermen, Scientists, and the Struggle to Revive the World's Greatest Fishery, (Island Press)
- Magazine: Gary Taubes for "The Soft Science of Dietary Fat" in Science
- Newspaper: Sabin Russell, Reynolds Holding, and Elizabeth Fernandez for "Breakdowns mar flu shot program" and "Waiting for shots" in the San Francisco Chronicle
- Television: Betsey Arledge, Julia Cort, and Robert Krulwich, for "Cracking the Code of Life" NOVA/WGBH-TV
- Web: David Tenenbaum for "Energy Crisis III?", The Why Files

=== 2000 ===
- Book: No award given
- Magazine:
  - Carol Ezzell for "Care for a Dying Continent", published in Scientific American
  - Eyal Press and Jennifer Washburn for "The Kept University", published in Atlantic Monthly
- Newspaper: Kitta MacPherson for "Food Fight - What Hath Science Wrought", published in The Star-Ledger of Newark, New Jersey
- Radio: Michael Tymchuk for "Kennewick Man — Bones of Contention", broadcast on the Canadian Broadcasting Corp.
- Television: Jon Palfreman for "What's Up With The Weather", broadcast on WGBH-TV's Frontline/PBS
- Web: No award given

=== 1999 ===
- Magazine: Gary Taubes for "The (Political) Science of Salt" in Science
- Newspaper: John Sirica, Charles Zehren, Jordan Rau, Lauren Terrazzano, and John Paraskevas for "Science Under Siege" in Newsday
- Broadcast: Dan Falk for "Visions of the Apocalypse", broadcast on the Canadian Broadcasting Corp.

=== 1998 ===
- Magazine: David Stipp and Robert Whitaker for "The Selling of Impotence" in Fortune
- Newspaper: Robert Langreth for "Revolution in Genetics Arms Cancer Fighter With Potent Weapons" in The Wall Street Journal
- Broadcast: Jon Palfreman for "The Last Battle of the Gulf War", broadcast on PBS's Frontline

=== 1997 ===
- Magazine: Susan Cohen, for "Tangled Lifeline", published in The Washington Post Magazine
- Newspaper: Michael Waldholz and David Sanford, The Wall Street Journal
- Broadcast: Kate King, CNN

=== 1996 ===
- Magazine: Gary Taubes for "Epidemiology Faces Its Limits", published in Science
- Newspaper: Ralph T. King Jr. for "Bitter Pill", published in The Wall Street Journal
- Broadcast: Jon Palfreman for "Breast Implants on Trial", broadcast on PBS's Frontline
