= Mad in America =

2002 book by Robert Whitaker

Mad in America: Bad Science, Bad Medicine, and the Enduring Mistreatment of the Mentally Ill
- Cover of the first edition
- Author: Robert Whitaker
- Language: English
- Subject: Psychiatry
- Publisher: Perseus Publishing
- Publication date: 2002
- Publication place: United States
- Media type: Print (Hardcover and Paperback)
- ISBN: 978-0-465-02014-0
- OCLC: 48779542

Mad in America: Bad Science, Bad Medicine, and the Enduring Mistreatment of the Mentally Ill is a 2002 book by medical journalist Robert Whitaker, in which the author examines and questions the efficacy, safety, and ethics of past and present psychiatric interventions for severe mental illnesses, particularly antipsychotics. The book is organized as a historical timeline of treatment development in the United States.

Mad in America received positive reviews from the general public and mixed reviews from the medical community, which criticized some bias in sourcing but nonetheless acknowledged the need to address the critical questions raised by the book regarding modern psychiatry.

== Synopsis ==
=== Part One: The Original Bedlam (1750–1900) ===
Part One describes early treatments like a spinning chair which could reach 100 revolutions per minute, the Tranquilizer Chair which immobilized patients, and water therapies. Whitaker then describes moral treatment, dating back to 1793 and the French Revolution and established in the U.S. by Quakers in 1817, in which lay superintendents treated the mentally ill in small homes with great kindness and had good outcomes: About 35 to 80 percent of patients were discharged within a year, the majority of them cured. Pennsylvania Hospital reported that about 45 percent of patients were discharged as cured and 25 percent discharged as improved. In Worcester State Hospital, 35 percent were chronically ill or had died while mentally ill. Dr. George Wood, a visitor, reported in 1851:

...you encounter persons walking, conversing, reading or variously occupied, neatly and often handsomely dressed, to whom as you pass you receive an introduction as in ordinary social life; and you find yourself not unfrequently quite at a loss to determine whether the persons met with are really the insane, or whether they may not be visitors or officials in the establishment.

=== Part Two: The Darkest Era (1900–1950) ===
Part Two describes the rise of eugenics, which did away with moral treatment in favor of forced sterilization of the mentally ill, and led to newly invigorated fields of psychiatry and neuroscience whose experts practiced insulin coma, metrazol convulsion, forced electroshock, and lobotomy.

=== Part Three: Back to Bedlam (1950–1990s) ===
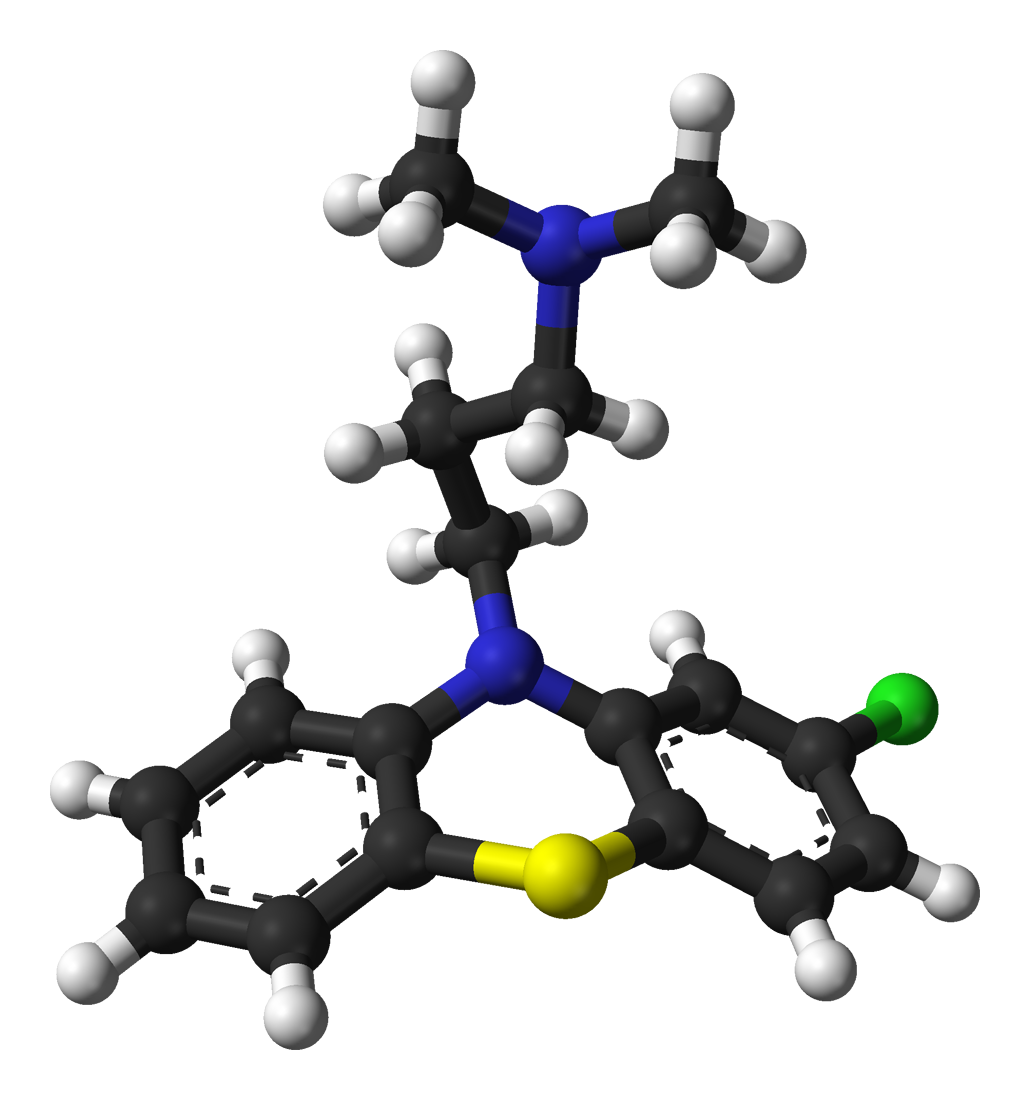
Chlorpromazine, marketed in the U.S. as Thorazine, was first synthesized by Rhône-Poulenc in 1950.

Part Three describes the discovery of phenothiazines and the advent of the neuroleptic drugs that were derived from them, such as chlorpromazine (Thorazine) by Rhône-Poulenc in France, and its purchase by Smith, Kline & French (today known as GlaxoSmithKline). The drug "produced an effect similar to frontal lobotomy", according to early reports by the company's lead investigator. Whitaker says that pharmaceutical advertising, articles published in the scientific literature, and stories in the media of "miracle drugs" transformed Thorazine into a healing drug.

Whitaker says that marketing money from pharmaceutical companies began to flow to the American Medical Association in 1951, a year after Thorazine was synthesized, because of the Durham-Humphrey Amendment to the Federal Food, Drug, and Cosmetic Act which "greatly expanded the list of medications that could only be obtained with a doctor's prescription".

In Part Three, Whitaker also describes the American (but not for example British) propensity to classify patients as "schizophrenic", as well as the error (confusion of schizophrenia with the yet-to-be-discovered encephalitis lethargica) in the original classification by Emil Kraepelin, which psychiatry chose to not revisit and fix. Whitaker then describes three pathways that dopamine may take in the human brain, and quotes first-person accounts of the effects of antipsychotic drugs on individuals.

He calls a 1996 New York Times advertisement by a consortium of pharmaceutical companies a "bald-faced lie": the group sought to say that the cause of psychosis and schizophrenia is an abnormal dopamine level and that their drugs worked by altering the level of dopamine. Whitaker then criticizes some American studies, and points out the work of George Crane at the National Institute of Mental Health to get tardive dyskinesia recognized, which up to that point had largely been touted as a symptom of schizophrenia, and he contrasts the dosages that British doctors were comfortable in prescribing (300 milligrams per day of Thorazine) with what American psychiatrists prescribed (1,500 up to perhaps 5,000 milligrams per day).

He sees irony in the fact that The New York Times reported on Soviet forced use of neuroleptic drugs (which Florida Senator Edward Gurney called "chemicals which convert human beings into vegetables") in "psychiatric jails", but called the same drugs "widely acknowledged to be effective" when reporting on American schizophrenic patients.

Whitaker describes the demise of modern-day moral treatment in a short history of Loren Mosher's Soteria Project, funded by the U.S. while Mosher was chief of schizophrenia at NIMH. He attributes the results in a World Health Organization 1979 study of outcomes for schizophrenia patients (which found better outcomes in undeveloped countries like India, Nigeria and Colombia than in developed countries like the United States, England, Denmark, Ireland, Russia, Czechoslovakia and Japan) to doctors in the developed world who maintained their patients on medications.

He then describes 50 years of American scientists doing experiments on schizophrenia patients: to intentionally exacerbate their symptoms and study the results. He compares the doctors' behavior, unfavorably, to 1947 after American trials of Nazi doctors ended in the Nuremberg Code for ethics in human experimentation.

=== Part Four: Mad Medicine Today (1990s–present) ===
Part Four is Whitaker's description of drug trials for the newer atypical antipsychotics. He says that many of these trials were stacked in favor of the drug being proposed by eliminating the placebo, or by comparing multiple doses of the new drug against a single, very high dose of the old one. He says that the pharmaceutical companies and the press used their influence to make claims for these drugs (some claims that the Food and Drug Administration had explicitly asked them not to make). Risperidone and olanzapine, for example, were both claimed to have fewer side effects than the first generation of antipsychotics. Whitaker also tells the stories of patients whose deaths were caused by drug trials, but were not mentioned to the public.

=== Epilogue ===
Whitaker calls it a type of medical fraud that schizophrenics are told that they suffer from too much dopamine or serotonin activity and that drugs put these brain chemicals back in "balance". And suggests that it would not be tolerated to mislead patients with verified pathological disease such as cancer and heart disease. He writes, "Little is known about what causes schizophrenia. Antipsychotic drugs do not fix any known brain abnormality, nor do they put brain chemistry back into balance. What they do is alter brain function in a manner that diminishes certain characteristic symptoms...". Which in various parts of the book he claims or alludes to the drugs having this effect on all other fundamental aspects of personality and behaviors, including the ability to take care of oneself, a notion he later explores more critically in Anatomy of an Epidemic.

== Reception ==
Recognizing Whitaker for marshalling evidence, a reviewer writing for the Chicago Tribune thought his hopes for moral treatment were admirable but inadequate. Writers for The Baltimore Sun and In These Times both liked the book but wondered why the author did not mention Thomas Szasz, a critic of psychiatry.

=== Scholarly journal reviews ===
Clinical psychologist Claudia Bukszpan Rutherford acknowledged that though the author holds an extreme position, the book's insight into many of the problems of clinical psychiatry over the years has good points: "While at times his lack of editorial restraint actually distracts from his message, and one may not agree with all of his arguments, his topic is a vital one that has needed to be raised for quite some time, and one which will hopefully be a catalyst for further discussion."

The book was also reviewed in JAMA, where reviewer Daniel J. Luchins, MD, of the University of Chicago observed the review of scientific literature to be biased at times. Despite this, Luchins concluded the book was of value in highlighting social aspects of treatment in psychiatry.

Physician J. van Gijn, reviewing the book for the New England Journal of Medicine, writes that "the book is more of an indictment than a historical account", and starts by pointing out that Whitaker "virtually equates mental illness with schizophrenia; depression and other psychiatric disorders are mentioned only parenthetically." Van Gijn summarizes the pre-1950 coverage of the book without much commentary, but then criticizes the rest of the book. Specifically, he questions Whitaker's assertion that Kraepelin's schizophrenia patients in fact suffered from encephalitis lethargica. With regard to antipsychotic medication, van Gijn notes that "Although there may be truth in the notion that dosages of antipsychotic drugs in the United States are higher than necessary, the author weakens his position by issuing continuous and unrelenting condemnations (for instance, 'The Nuremberg Code doesn't apply here'), despite a dearth of evidence to support them." Van Gijn then describes Whitaker's attack on the dopamine hypothesis of schizophrenia as "simplistic reasoning", and concludes that "Although [Whitaker] is widely read on the subject, the facts are largely arranged to suit his prejudice, especially in the chapters on drug treatment. American psychiatric institutions may have their failings in the current management of patients with schizophrenia, but they deserve better critics."

Psychologist Clare Mundell, PhD, writing for the Journal of the American Academy of Psychoanalysis and Dynamic Psychiatry said Mad in America "should be required reading not only for mental health professionals, but also for those who still question whether profit has eclipsed patient care as the primary force in medicine in this country."

=== Online reviews ===
David Pilgrim, writing "News of scandal is a few decades too late" for Times Higher Education, focuses on the book's shortcomings, saying, "The semi-academic froth he generates distracts the reader from a legitimate outrage, which is not his alone. It was shared by many others well before 1998" (the year Whitaker began writing on mental health).

Physician Larry S. Goldman wrote a critical review of the book in WebMD's Medscape Today, claiming that Whitaker "is ready to throw the baby out with the bath water" because Mad in America fails to acknowledge any biological abnormalities in schizophrenia, while at the same conceding that Whitaker's argument is correct in the sense that the true causes of schizophrenia are not known. Goldman concludes that the "overheated style" of the book "tends to undermine some of its more important points, such as the unhealthy symbiosis between the US pharmaceutical industry and much of the psychiatric research community and the ever-present miserliness of public mental healthcare systems."

In a rejoinder to Goldman's review, physician Nathaniel S. Lehrman disagrees with Goldman, and writes that "Whitaker is right", and goes on to agree with the main points in the book, namely that antipsychotic drugs cause brain damage, that despite "psychiatrically produced misconceptions", they "do not fix any known brain abnormality nor do they put brain chemistry back into balance. What they do is alter brain functions in a manner that diminishes certain characteristic symptoms." Lehrman then writes that all the data accumulated on the neurobiology of schizophrenia "has hardly helped patient care."

Lehrman later wrote in the official journal of the conservative political organization the Association of American Physicians and Surgeons, the Journal of American Physicians and Surgeons that Mad in America is "perhaps the most important psychiatric book of the 21st century."

Christian Perring, editor of Metapsychology Online Review and who was impressed by the book, wrote, "Even though Whitaker himself could be accused of being overly critical of psychiatry, his argument against schizophrenia medication is cogent enough to urgently require an answer."

E. Fuller Torrey writing for the Treatment Advocacy Center called it "histrionic" and "deeply disappointing."

Physician Marcia Angell, MD, writing a two-part review for The New York Review of Books, called this and similar books "powerful indictments of the way psychiatry is now practiced", documenting "the 'frenzy' of diagnosis, the overuse of drugs with sometimes devastating side effects, and widespread conflicts of interest."

== See also ==
- Liberation by Oppression (2002) by Thomas Szasz
- Big Pharma (2006) by Jacky Law
- Anatomy of an Epidemic (2010) by Robert Whitaker
- Mad Pride
