= Mary Boyle (psychologist) =

British clinical psychologist

Mary Boyle is a clinical psychologist. She is a Professor Emeritus at University of East London.

== Books ==
- Schizophrenia: A Scientific Delusion?, 2nd ed., Routledge, 2002, ISBN 0-415-22718-6

-explores the concept of schizophrenia through the lens of the philosophy of science using concepts from Rudolf Carnap and Lewis White Beck considering the validity of the biological basis for schizophrenia including genetic research. It considers the validity of the DSM's definition of schizophrenia, and considers aspects of the sociology behind its diagnosis and the concept itself following Michel Foucault. It explores alternatives to the diagnosis of schizophrenia.

- Rethinking Abortion: Psychology, Gender and the Law, Routledge, 1997, ISBN 0-415-16364-1

== Awards ==
- Fellow of the British Psychological Society
- Fellow of the Royal Society of Medicine
- Fellow of the Royal Society of Arts.

== See also ==
- Controversies about psychiatry
