= Emma Marris =

American non-fiction writer

Emma Marris (born January 15, 1979) is an American non-fiction writer. She grew up in Seattle, Washington, and attended Roosevelt High School, where she worked on the school newspaper. She earned a BA in English at the University of Texas at Austin and a Masters in Science Writing from Johns Hopkins University, and wrote for the scientific journal Nature for five years. Her book Rambunctious Garden: Saving Nature in a Post-Wild World introduces conservation approaches that go beyond simply protecting land seen as "wilderness." Her 2021 book, Wild Souls: Freedom and Flourishing in the Non-Human World, focuses on the ethics of human relationships with wild animals, including hunting, keeping wild pets, captive breeding, and wildlife management. Marris proposes a unified ethical approach that balances the protection of biodiversity with respect for the welfare and autonomy of nonhuman animals. Her TED talks have been watched over 3 million times. Her articles appear in outlets including National Geographic, Outside, the Atavist, Wired, High Country News, the Atlantic, and the New York Times.
