= Peter Breggin =

American psychiatrist (born 1936)

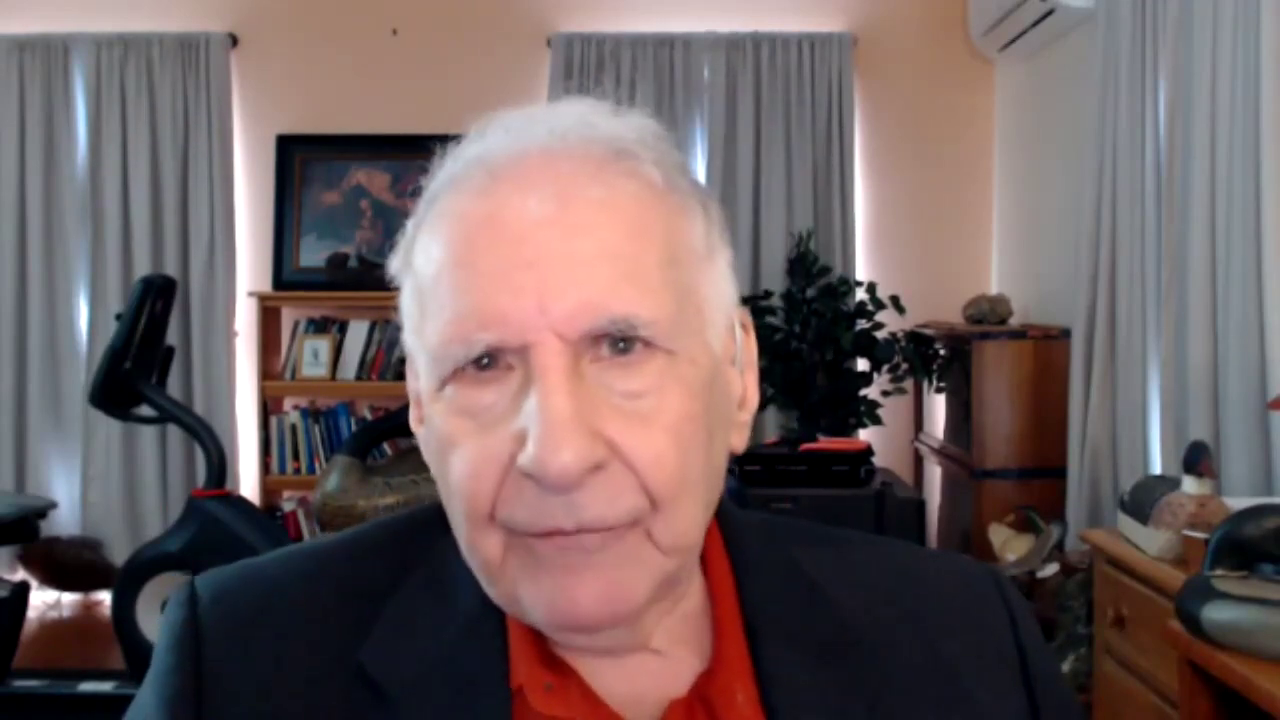
- Born: May 11, 1936 (age 90)
- Education: Harvard College; Case Western Reserve School of Medicine
- Known for: Criticism of biopsychiatry and psychiatric drugs
- Scientific career
- Fields: Psychiatry, psychotherapy
- Website: www.breggin.com

Peter Roger Breggin (born May 11, 1936) is an American psychiatrist and critic of shock treatment and psychiatric medication. In his books, he advocates replacing psychiatry's use of drugs and electroconvulsive therapy with psychotherapy, education, empathy, love, and broader human services.

Breggin is the author of many books critical of psychiatric medication, including Toxic Psychiatry, Talking Back to Prozac and Talking Back to Ritalin. His most recent book, Brain-Disabling Treatments in Psychiatry, discusses his theory of medication spellbinding (in which patients are said to do worse after treatment but fail to see this or recognize why), the adverse effects of drugs and electroconvulsive therapy (ECT), the hazards of diagnosing and medicating children, Breggin's theory of a "psychopharmaceutical complex", and guidelines for psychotherapy and counseling.

Breggin now lives in the Finger Lakes, Central New York, and practices psychiatry in Ithaca, New York.

== Education and early career ==
Breggin graduated from George W. Hewlett High School in 1954 and was inducted to their Hall of Fame in 2001. Breggin graduated from Harvard College in 1958 then attended Case Western Reserve Medical School. His postgraduate training in psychiatry began with an internship year of mixed medicine and psychiatry at the State University of New York Upstate Medical University in Syracuse. Breggin completed a first year of psychiatric residency at Harvard's Massachusetts Mental Health Center in Boston, where he was a teaching fellow at Harvard Medical School, and finished his final two years of psychiatric residency at SUNY. This was followed by a two-year staff appointment to the National Institute of Mental Health (NIMH), where he worked to build and staff mental health centers and education. Breggin has taught at several universities, obtaining faculty appointments to the Washington School of Psychiatry, the Johns Hopkins University Department of Counseling, and the George Mason University Institute for Conflict Analysis and Resolution. Breggin has worked in a private practice since 1968.

As an undergraduate Breggin had volunteered at the state mental hospital, leading the volunteer program and co-authoring a book "College students in a mental hospital". He recalls at the age of 18 witnessing electroconvulsive therapy being practiced then in the 'shock room' and finding it barbaric. After becoming a psychiatrist in the early 70s, he also campaigned against any return of the crude brain procedure known as lobotomy. Breggin reports that he was threatened and insulted with psychiatric terms at a meeting of the American Psychiatric Association in 1972, by leading ECT advocate Leo Alexander, and won damages for libel and slander.

== Career and distinctions ==
Breggin practiced psychiatry in Washington, D.C., and Bethesda, Maryland, for nearly 35 years.

In 1972, he founded the Center for the Study of Psychiatry, which was known as the International Center for the Study of Psychiatry and Psychology until 2011, when it was renamed the International Society for Ethical Psychology and Psychiatry. In 1979 "Electroshock: Its Brain-Disabling Effects" was published.

Breggin is a life member of the American Psychiatric Association and an editor for several scientific journals. His opinions have been portrayed both favorably and unfavorably in the media, including Time magazine and The New York Times. He has appeared as a guest on shows including Oprah, 60 Minutes, 20/20, and Good Morning America.

Breggin was invited many times "to testify before federal agencies and the U.S. Congress, and he has been an expert on psychiatry drug adverse effects for the Federal Aviation Agency (FAA). He has also testified many times at FDA hearings".

He later ran The Center for the Study of Empathic Therapy, Education and Living, a 501(c) organization.

In 2002 he moved to Ithaca. In 2010, he and his wife Ginger formed a new organization devoted to speaking out against "the hazards of contemporary biological psychiatry" and promoting more "caring and empathic approaches to personal conflict and suffering". A documentary about his life, "The Conscience of Psychiatry", was released in 2009.

== Research ==
Breggin studied mainly clinical psychopharmacology. He wrote dozens of other articles, several book chapters, and more than twenty books. He also co-founded a journal with David Cohen and Steven Baldwin, Ethical Human Psychology and Psychiatry, where he published many of his own papers. Many of his articles discuss psychiatric medication, the U.S. Food and Drug Administration (FDA) drug approval process, the evaluation of clinical trials, and the ethics of psychiatric practice.

Breggin published one science fiction novel, After The Good War: A Love Story, in 1972. It has a strong proportion of psychiatric subject matter.

=== Conventional psychiatry ===
His work focused on the negative side effects of psychiatric medications, arguing that the harmful side effects typically outweigh any benefit. Breggin also argues that psychosocial interventions are almost always superior in treating mental illness. He has argued against psychoactive drugs, electroshock (ECT), psychosurgery, coercive involuntary treatment, and biological theories of psychiatry.

According to Breggin, the pharmaceutical industry propagates disinformation that is accepted by unsuspecting doctors, saying "the psychiatrist accepts the bad science that establishes the existence of all these mental diseases in the first place. From there it's just a walk down the street to all the drugs as remedies." He points out problems with conflicts-of-interest (such as the financial relationships between drug companies, researchers, and the American Psychiatric Association). Breggin states psychiatric drugs, "... are all, every class of them, highly dangerous". He asserts: "If neuroleptics were used to treat anyone other than mental patients, they would have been banned a long time ago. If their use wasn't supported by powerful interest groups, such as the pharmaceutical industry and organized psychiatry, they would be rarely used at all. Meanwhile, the neuroleptics have produced the worst epidemic of neurological disease in history. At the least, their use should be severely curtailed."

In his book, Reclaiming Our Children, he calls for the ethical treatment of children. Breggin argues that the mistreatment of children is a national (U.S.) tragedy, including psychiatric diagnoses and prescription of drugs for children whose needs were not otherwise met. He especially objects to prescribing psychiatric medications to children, arguing that it distracts from their real needs in the family and schools, and is potentially harmful to their developing brains and nervous systems.

=== ADHD and Ritalin ===
The New York Times has labeled Breggin as the nation's best-known Attention-deficit hyperactivity disorder (ADHD) critic. As early as 1991 he sardonically coined the acronym DADD, stating, "... most so-called ADHD children are not receiving sufficient attention from their fathers who are separated from the family, too preoccupied with work and other things, or otherwise impaired in their ability to parent. In many cases the appropriate diagnosis is Dad Attention Deficit Disorder (DADD)". Breggin has written two books specifically on the topic entitled, Talking Back to Ritalin and The Ritalin Factbook. In these books he has made controversial claims, such as "Ritalin 'works' by producing malfunctions in the brain rather than by improving brain function. This is the only way it works".

Together with Fred Baughman, Breggin testified about ADHD to the United States Congress. In Congress Breggin claimed "that there were no scientific studies validating ADHD", that children diagnosed with ADHD needed "discipline and better instruction" rather than psychiatric drugs, and that therapeutic stimulants "are the most addictive drugs known in medicine today." Baughman and Breggin were also the major critics in a PBS Frontline TV series about ADHD entitled 'Medicating Kids'.

Breggin has been very critical of psychologist Russell Barkley's work on ADHD, claiming that he exaggerates the benefits of stimulants and minimizes their hazards.

=== SSRI antidepressants ===
In the early 1990s Breggin suggested there were problems with the methodology in the research of SSRI antidepressants. As early as 1994 in Talking Back to Prozac, he warned that Prozac was causing violence, suicide and mania. Breggin elaborated on this theme in many subsequent books and articles about newer antidepressants. In 2005, the FDA began requiring black box warnings on SSRIs, warning of an association between SSRI use and suicidal behavior in children, and later extended it to young adults. New general warnings were added along with the aforementioned black box warnings. These warnings confirmed many of the adverse effects first emphasized by Breggin in Toxic Psychiatry with specific mentions by the FDA of drug-induced "hostility", "irritability", and "mania". In 2006, the FDA expanded the warnings to include adults taking Paxil, which is associated with a higher risk of suicidal behavior as compared to a placebo.

In 1994, Breggin said that Eli Lilly and Company (maker of the antidepressant Prozac) attempted to discredit him and his book Talking Back to Prozac by falsely linking him to the Church of Scientology and labeling his views as "Neo-Scientology".

=== Electroconvulsive therapy ===
Breggin has written several books and scientific articles critical of electroconvulsive therapy (ECT). He claims "... the damage produces delirium so severe that patients can't fully experience depression or other higher mental functions during the several weeks after electroshock." He was one of nineteen speakers at the 1985 NIH Consensus Development Conference on ECT. The Consensus panel (of which Breggin was not a member) found that ECT could be a useful therapy in some carefully defined cases.

== Expert witness ==
Breggin testified as an expert witness in the Wesbecker case (Fentress et al., 1994), a lawsuit against Eli Lilly, makers of Prozac. Ultimately, the jury found for Eli Lilly. According to Breggin, this was because the plaintiffs and defendants had secretly settled behind closed doors. The Supreme Court of Kentucky concluded that the Wesbecker trial had been secretly settled by Eli Lilly before going to the jury in return for plaintiffs presenting a weakened case that was bound to lose. Trial Judge Potter was empowered by the Kentucky Supreme Court to change the verdict from a jury verdict in favor of Eli Lilly to "settled with prejudice" by Eli Lilly.

In South Carolina, Breggin testified on behalf of Peggy S. Salters, a psychiatric nurse who sued her doctors and Palmetto Baptist Hospital in Columbia after ECT left her incapacitated in 2000. A jury found in favor of her and awarded her $635,177 in actual damages.

In 2002, Breggin was hired as an expert witness by a survivor of the Columbine High School massacre in a case against the makers of an anti-depressant drug. In his report, Breggin noted that "... Eric Harris was suffering from a substance induced (Luvox-induced) mood disorder with depressive and manic features that had reached a psychotic level of violence and suicide. Absent persistent exposure to Luvox, Eric Harris probably would not have committed violence and suicide." However, the argument was rejected by the judge, and the lawsuit was eventually dropped with the stipulation that the makers of Luvox donate $10,000 to the American Cancer Society.

In 2005, he testified as the medical expert in a trial in which a jury "returned a malpractice verdict against a shock doctor in favor of the injured patient". His testimony as a witness helped to win against the adherents of shock treatment and psychosurgery and it was announced as harmful.

On September 16, 2011, in Winnipeg, Canada, a provincial judge cited Breggin's testimony in concluding that Prozac caused a sixteen-year-old boy to knife a friend to death, noting that, "Dr. Breggin's explanation of the effect Prozac was having on C.J.P.'s behavior both before that day and in committing an impulsive, inexplicable violent act that day corresponds with the evidence." About the boy, Judge Robert Heinrichs determined, "His basic normalcy now further confirms he no longer poses a risk of violence to anyone and that his mental deterioration and resulting violence would not have taken place without exposure to Prozac."

On November 20, 2012, a New York State Supreme Court jury awarded $1.5 million malpractice verdict to the family of a man who committed suicide while taking psychiatric drugs, including antidepressants. Dr. Breggin was the expert witness for the family.

== Criticism ==
In 1987, the National Alliance on Mental Illness (NAMI) brought a complaint against Breggin with the board of the State of Maryland. NAMI was upset about remarks he made on The Oprah Winfrey Show on April 2, 1987. On the TV show, Breggin stated that mental health clients should judge their clinicians in terms of their empathy and support; if they failed to show interest in them and tried to prescribe drugs during the first session, he advised such clients to seek assistance elsewhere. He also pointed out the iatrogenic effects of neuroleptic drugs. He was defended by a diverse group of psychiatrists and others who defended his right to publicly state his critical opinion. Breggin was cleared of any wrongdoing by the Maryland medical board.

== Publications ==
=== Books ===
List of books
Year	Title	Publisher	Notes
2021	Covid-19 and the Global Predators: We are the Prey	Pre-Order/Ebook	ISBN 9780982456064
2016	Psychosocial Approaches to Deeply Disturbed Persons	Routledge	ISBN 1138984167
2014	Guilt, Shame, and Anxiety: Understanding and Overcoming Negative Emotions	Prometheus Books (5 Jan. 2015)	ISBN 978-1616141493
2014	Talking Back to Prozac: What Doctors Aren't Telling You About Prozac and the Newer Antidepressants	Open Road Integrated Media, Inc.	ISBN 1497638771
2013	Psychiatric Drug Withdrawal: A Guide for Prescribers, Therapists, Patients and their Families	New York: Springer Publishing Company	ISBN 978-0826108432
2011	Empathic Therapy by Peter R. Breggin MD, film on DVD	Studio: Lake Edge Press	ASIN B00KWLKBLA
2009	Wow, I'm an American! How to Live Like Our Nation's Heroic Founders	Lake Edge Press	ISBN 978-0-9824560-1-9
2009	The Conscience of Psychiatry: The Reform Work of Peter R.	Lake Edge Press (August 25, 2009)	ISBN 978-0982456002
2008	Medication Madness: A Psychiatrist Exposes the Dangers of Mood-Altering Medications	New York: St. Martin's Press	ISBN 978-0312363383
2008	Brain-Disabling Treatments in Psychiatry: Drugs, Electroshock and the Psychopharmaceutical Complex, Second Edition	New York: Springer Publishing Company	ISBN 978-0826129345
2007	Your Drug May Be Your Problem: How and Why to Stop Taking Psychiatric Medications, Second Edition	Cambridge, Mass.: Perseus Books	ISBN 978-0738210988
2005	Electroshock Treatment over Four Decades: The Case Against	Morgan Foundation Publishers: International Published Innovations	ISBN 1885679025
2003	The Central Intelligence Agency	Cengage Gale	ISBN 0737717262
2002	The Ritalin Fact Book: What Your Doctor Won't Tell You	Cambridge, Mass.: Perseus Books	ISBN 978-0738204505
2002	Dimensions of Empathic Therapy	Springer Publishing Company	
2001	The Anti-Depressant Fact Book: What Your Doctor Won't Tell You About Prozac, Zoloft, Paxil, Celexa, and Luvox	Cambridge, Mass.: Perseus Books	ISBN 978-0738204512
2001	Talking Back to Ritalin, Revised Edition	Cambridge, Mass.: Perseus Books	
2000	Reclaiming Our Children: A Healing Solution for a Nation in Crisis	Cambridge, Mass.: Perseus Books	ISBN 978-0738204260
1999	Your Drug May Be Your Problem: How and Why To Stop Taking Psychiatric Medications	Cambridge, Mass.: Perseus Books	
1998	The War Against Children of Color : Psychiatry Targets Inner City Youth	Common Courage Press	ISBN 1567511279
1998	Talking Back To Ritalin	Common Courage Press	
1997	Brain-Disabling Treatments in Psychiatry: Drugs, Electroshock and the Role of the FDA	New York: Springer Publishing Company	ISBN 978-0826194916
1997; new paperback edition 2006	The Heart of Being Helpful: Empathy and the Creation of a Healing Presence	New York: Springer Publishing Company	ISBN 978-0826102744
1997	Enough Is Enough	Addison Wesley Publishing Company	ISBN 0201328100
1996	Psychosocial Approaches to Deeply Disturbed Persons	Haworth Press	
1994	The War Against Children	New York: St. Martin's Press	
1994	Talking Back to Prozac	New York: St. Martin's Press	
1992	Beyond Conflict: From Self-Help and Psychotherapy to Peacemaking	New York: St. Martin's Press	ASIN B01FEOK6LY
1991	Toxic Psychiatry: Why Therapy, Empathy and Love Must Replace the Drugs, Electroshock, and Biochemical Theories of the "New Psychiatry"	New York: St. Martin's Press	ASIN B017RC8FZA
1983	Psychiatric Drugs: Hazards to the Brain	New York: Springer Publishing Company	ASIN B01FIXS0ZK
1980	The Psychology of Freedom : Liberty and Love As a Way of Life	Prometheus Books, Publishers	ISBN 0879751320
1979	Electroshock: Its Brain-Disabling Effects	New York: Springer Publishing Company	ISBN 978-0826127105
1972	After The Good War: A Love Story	New York: Popular Library	ISBN 978-0812814927
1971	Crazy from the Sane	Carol Publishing Corporation	ISBN 0818401028
1962	College Students in a Mental Hospital: Contribution to the Social Rehabilitation of the Mentally Ill	New York, Grune & Stratton,	

=== Books with co-authors ===
- Breggin, P. R. Breggin, G. R., and Bemak, F. (Editors) (2002). Dimensions of Empathic Therapy. New York: Springer Publishing Company. ISBN 978-0826115133.
- Breggin, P. R. and Cohen, D. (1999) Your Drug May Be Your Problem: How and Why To Stop Taking Psychiatric Medications. Cambridge, Mass.: Perseus Books.
- Breggin, P. R. and Breggin, G. R. (1998). The war against children of color. Psychiatry Targets Inner City Youth. Monroe, Maine: Common Courage Press.
- Breggin, P. R. (senior editor) Psychosocial Approaches to Deeply Disturbed Persons. (1996) New York: Haworth Press.
- Breggin, P. R. and Breggin, G. R. (1994). The War Against Children: How the Drugs, Programs, and Theories of the Psychiatric Establishment Are Threatening America's Children with a Medical 'Cure' for Violence. New York: St. Martin's Press.
- Breggin, P. R. and Breggin, G. R. (1994). Talking Back To Prozac: What Doctors Aren't Telling You About Today's Most Controversial Drug. New York: St. Martin's Press.
- Breggin, Peter R., with co-authors Carter Umbarger, James Dalsimer, Andrew Morrison (1962). College Students in a Mental Hospital: Contribution to the Social Rehabilitation of the Mentally Ill New York: Grune & Stratton.

=== Articles ===
Scientific Papers

- Breggin, PR (2021). "Making psychiatric drug withdrawal as safe as possible". In Peter Lehmann & Craig Newnes (Eds.), Withdrawal from Prescribed Psychotropic Drugs. Berlin / Lancaster: Peter Lehmann Publishing, pp. 439–455.
- Breggin, PR. (2016). "Rational Principles of Psychopharmacology for Therapists, Healthcare Providers and Clients". Journal of Contemporary Psychotherapy 46:1–13.
- "Understanding and Overcoming Guilt, Shame, and Anxiety: Based on Theory of Negative Legacy Emotions" (2015). Chapter 5 of Promoting Psychological Well-Being in Children and Families. Edited by Bruce Kirkcaldy. Palgrave Macmillan, 2015.
- Breggin, PR. (2015). "The biological evolution of guilt, shame and anxiety: A new theory of negative legacy emotions". Medical Hypotheses 85, 17–24
- Breggin, PR. (2015)."Understanding and Helping People with Hallucinations Based on the Theory of Negative Legacy Emotions". The Humanistic Psychologist, 43: 70–87
- Breggin, PR. "TBI, PTSD, and psychiatric drugs. A perfect storm for causing abnormal mental states and aberrant behavior". In Brock, H. and Else, R.C. (Eds). The Attorney's Guide to Defending Veterans in Criminal Court. Minneapolis: Veterans Defense Project. Chapter 10, pp. 251–264, 2014.

Psychology, Life, and Overcoming Negative Emotions

- Breggin (2016). "Rational Principles of Psychopharmacology for Therapists, Healthcare Providers and Clients". Journal of Contemporary Psychotherapy
- Breggin, PR. Chapter 5 of Promoting Psychological Well-Being in Children and Families. Edited by Bruce Kirkcaldy. Palgrave Macmillan, 2015.
- Breggin, PR. (2015). "The biological evolution of guilt, shame and anxiety: A new theory of negative legacy emotions". Medical Hypotheses 85, 17–24
- Breggin, PR. (2015). "Understanding and Helping People with Hallucinations Based on the Theory of Negative Legacy Emotions". The Humanistic Psychologist, 43: 70–87.
- Breggin, PR (2008). "Practical Applications: 22 Guidelines for Counseling and Psychotherapy". Ethical Human Psychology and Psychiatry, 10, 43–57, 2008.

Peer-reviewed publications

1. Breggin, Peter. "The Psychophysiology of Anxiety". The Journal of Nervous and Mental Disease, 139, 558–568, 1964.

2. Breggin, Peter. "Coercion of Voluntary Patients in an Open Hospital". Archives of General Psychiatry, 10:173–181, 1964. Reprinted with a new introduction in Edwards, R.B. (ed):Psychiatry and Ethics. Buffalo, Prometheus Books, 1982, and in Edwards, R.B. (ed): Ethics of Psychiatry. Amherst, New York, Prometheus Books, 1997.

3. Breggin, Peter. "The Sedative-like Effect of Epinephrine". Archives of General Psychiatry,12, 255–259, 1965.

4. Malev, J.S.; Breggin, P.R. et al. "For Better or for Worse: A Problem in Ethics". International Psychiatric Clinics, 2(3), 603–24, 1965.

5. Breggin, Peter. "Psychotherapy as Applied Ethics". Psychiatry, 34:59–75, 1971.

6. Breggin, Peter. "Lobotomy: An Alert". The American Journal of Psychiatry, 129:97, 1972.

7. Breggin, Peter. "Psychosurgery". JAMA, 226:1121, 1973.

8. Breggin, Peter. "The Second Wave of Psychosurgery". M/H (Mental Health), 57:10–13, 1973.

9. Breggin, Peter. "Therapy as Applied Utopian Politics". Mental Health and Society, 1:129–146, 1974.

10. Lundy PJ and Breggin, Peter. "Psychiatric oppression of prisoners". Psychiatric Opinion. 11(3):30–7, 1974.

11. Breggin, Peter. "Psychosurgery for Political Purposes". Duquesne Law Review, 13:841–862, 1975.

12. Breggin, Peter. "Psychiatry and Psychotherapy as Political Processes". American Journal of Psychotherapy, 29:369–382, 1975.

13. Breggin, Peter. "Madness is a Failure of Free Will; Therapy Too Often Encourages It". Psychiatric Quarterly, 53:61–68, 1981. Originally published (in French) in Verdiglione A (ed): "La Folie Dans La Psychoanalyse". Paris, Payot, 1977.

14. Breggin, Peter. "Electroconvulsive therapy for depression". The New England Journal of Medicine, 27;303(22):1305–6, 1980.

15. Breggin, Peter. "Electroshock Therapy and Brain Damage: The Acute Organic Brain Syndrome as Treatment". Behavior and Brain Sciences, 7:24–25, 1984.

16. Breggin, Peter. "Neuropathology and Cognitive Dysfunction from ECT". Electroconvulsive Consensus Development Conference Programs and Abstracts, pp. 59–64, 1985. Sponsored by the National Institute of Mental Health and the NIH Office of Medical Applications Research. Bethesda, Maryland, June 10–12, 1985 at the National Institutes of Health.

17. Breggin, Peter. "Neuropathology and Cognitive Dysfunction from ECT". Psychopharmacology Bulletin, 22:476–479, 1986.

18. Breggin, Peter. "Brain damage from nondominant ECT". The American Journal of Psychiatry, 143(10):1320–1, 1986.

19. Breggin, Peter and de Girolamo, G. "Ellettroshock: Tra Rischioiatrogeno e Mito Terapeutico". Quaderni Italiani di Psychiatrica, 6:497–540, 1987.

20. Breggin, Peter. "Precious the Crow". Voices (journal of the American Academy of Psychotherapists), 23:32–42, Summer 1987.

21. Breggin, Peter. "The Three Dynamics of Human Progress: A Unified Theory Applicable to Individuals, Institutions and Society". Review of Existential Psychology and Psychiatry, 21(1–3):97–123, 1988–89.

22. Breggin, Peter. "Addiction to Neuroleptics?" The American Journal of Psychiatry, 146(4):560, 1989.

23. Breggin, Peter. "Dr. Breggin replies". The American Journal of Psychiatry, 146(9):1240, 1989.

24. Breggin, Peter. "Brain Damage, Dementia and Persistent Cognitive Dysfunction Associated with Neuroleptic Drugs: Evidence, Etiology, Implications". Journal of Mind Behavior, 11:425–464, 1990.

25. Breggin, Peter. "Psychotherapy in the Shadow of the Psycho-Pharmaceutical Complex". Voices (journal of the American Academy of Psychotherapists), 27:15–21, 1991

26. Weinberg MH and Breggin, Peter. "The homeless mentally ill". The American Journal of Psychiatry, 148(5):690–1, 1991.

27. Breggin, Peter. "A Case of Fluoxetine-induced Stimulant Side Effects with Suicidal Ideation Associated with a Possible Withdrawal Syndrome ('Crashing')". International Journal of Risk & Safety in Medicine, 3:325–328, 1992

28. Breggin, Peter. "Parallels Between Neuroleptic Effects and Lethargic Encephalitis: The Production of Dyskinesias and Cognitive disorders". Brain and Cognition, 23:8–27, 1993.

29. Breggin, Peter and Breggin, Ginger Ross. "A Biomedical Programme for Urban Violence Control in the US: The Dangers of Psychiatric Social Control". Changes: An International Journal of Psychology and Psychotherapy, 11(1) (March):59–71, 1993.

30. Breggin, Peter. "Psychiatry's Role in the Holocaust". International Journal of Risk and Safety in Medicine, 4:133–148, 1993. Adapted from a paper delivered at "Medical Science Without Compassion" in Cologne, Germany and published in the conference proceedings.

31. Breggin PR. "Genetics and crime". Science, 262(5139):1498, 1993.

32. Breggin, Peter. "Encephalitis lethargica". The Journal of Neuropsychiatry and Clinical Neurosciences, 7(3), 387, 1995.`

33. Breggin, Peter. "Campaigns Against Racist Federal Programs by the Center for the Study of Psychiatry and Psychology". Journal of African American Men, 1(3), 3–22, Winter 1995/96.

34. Breggin, Peter. "Should the Use of Neuroleptics Be Severely Limited?" Changes: An International Journal of Psychology and Psychotherapy, 14:62–66 March 1996.

35. Breggin, Peter and Breggin, Ginger Ross. "The Hazards of Treating 'Attention-Deficit/Hyperactivity Disorder' with Methylphenidate (Ritalin)" Journal of College Student Psychotherapy, 10:55–72, 1996.

36. Breggin, Peter. "Psychotherapy in Emotional Crises without Resort to Psychiatric Medication". The Humanistic Psychologist, 25:2–14, 1998.

37. Breggin, Peter. "Analysis of Adverse Behavioral Effects of Benzodiazepines with a Discussion of Drawing Scientific Conclusions from the FDA's Spontaneous Reporting System". Journal of Mind and Behavior, 19:21–50, 1998.

38. Breggin, Peter. "Electroshock: Scientific, ethical, and political issues". International Journal of Risk & Safety in Medicine, 11:5–40, 1998.

39. Breggin, Peter. "Does clozapine treatment cause brain disease?" Archives of General Psychiatry, 55(9):845, 1998.

40. Breggin, Peter. "Psychostimulants in the treatment of children diagnosed with ADHD: Part I—Acute risks and psychological effects". Ethical Human Sciences and Services, 1:13–33, 1999.

41. Breggin, Peter. "Psychostimulants in the treatment of children diagnosed with ADHD: Part II—Adverse effects on brain and behavior". Ethical Human Sciences and Services, 1:213–241, 1999.

42. Breggin, Peter. "Psychostimulants in the treatment of children diagnosed with ADHD: Risks and mechanism of action". International Journal of Risk and Safety in Medicine, 12 (1), 3–35, 1999. (Simultaneously published version of #24 and 25)

43. Breggin, Peter. "Empathic self-transformation and love in individual and family therapy". Humanistic Psychologist, 27:267–282, 1999.

44. Breggin, Peter. "Treatment of attention-deficit/hyperactivity disorder". JAMA, 281(16):1490–1, 1999.

45. Breggin, Peter. "What psychologists and psychotherapists need to know about ADHDand stimulants". Changes: An International Journal of Psychology and Psychotherapy, 18:13–23, Spring 2000

46. Breggin, Peter. "The NIMH multimodal study of treatment for attention-deficit/hyperactivity disorder: A critical analysis". International Journal of Risk and Safety in Medicine, 13:15–22, 2000. Also published in Ethical Human Sciences and Services.

47. Breggin, Peter. "MTA study has flaws". Archives of General Psychiatry, 58:1184, 2001.

48. Breggin, Peter. "Empowering social work in the era of biological psychiatry". The annual Ephraim Lisansky lecture of the University of Maryland School of Social Work. Ethical Human Sciences and Services, 3:197–206, 2001.

49. Breggin, Peter. "Questioning the treatment for ADHD". Science, 291(5504):595, 2001.

50. Breggin, Peter. "Fluvoxamine as a cause of stimulation, mania, and aggression with a critical analysis of the FDA-approved label". International Journal of Risk and Safety in Medicine, 14: 71–86, 2002. Simultaneously published in Ethical Human Sciences and Services, 4, 211–227, 2002.

51. Breggin, Peter. "Psychopharmacology and human values". Journal of Humanistic Psychology, 43: 34–49, 2003.

52. Breggin, Peter. "Suicidality, violence and mania caused by selective serotonin reuptake inhibitors (SSRIs): A review and analysis". International Journal of Risk and Safety in Medicine, 16: 31–49, 2003/2004. Simultaneously published in Ethical Human Sciences and Services, 5:225–246, 2003.

53. Breggin, Peter. "Re: Mud Splatters". British Medical Journal, October 14, 2004.

54. Breggin, Peter. "Recent U.S., Canadian and British regulatory agency actions concerning antidepressant-induced harm to self and others: A review and analysis". Ethical Human Psychology and Psychiatry, 7, 7–22, 2005. Simultaneously published in the International Journal of Risk and Safety in Medicine, 16, 247–259, 2005.

55. Breggin, Peter. "Recent regulatory changes in antidepressant labels: Implications for activation (stimulation) in clinical practice". Primary Psychiatry, 13, 57–60, 2006.

56. Breggin, Peter. "Court filing makes public my previously suppressed analysis of Paxil's effects". Ethical Human Psychology and Psychiatry, 8, 77–84, 2006.

57. Breggin, Peter. "How GlaxoSmithKline suppressed data on Paxil-induced akathisia: Implications for suicide and violence". Ethical Human Psychology and Psychiatry, 8, 91–100, 2006.14

58. Breggin, Peter. "Drug company suppressed data on paroxetine-induced stimulation: Implications for violence and suicide". Ethical Human Psychology and Psychiatry, 8, 255–263, 2006.

59. Breggin, Peter. "Intoxication anosognosia: The spellbinding effect of psychiatric drugs". Ethical Human Psychology and Psychiatry, 8, 201–215, 2006. Simultaneously published in the International Journal of Risk and Safety and Medicine, 19, 3–15, 2007.

60. Breggin, Peter. "ECT damages the brain: Disturbing news for patients and shock doctors alike". Ethical Human Psychology and Psychiatry, 9, 83–86, 2007.

61. Breggin, Peter and Breggin, Ginger Ross. "Exposure to SSRI antidepressants in utero causes birth defects, neonatal withdrawal symptoms and brain damage". Ethical Human Psychology and Psychiatry, 10, 5–9, 2008.

62. Donald Marks; Breggin, Peter; and Braslow, Derek. "Homicidal ideation causally related to therapeutic medications". Ethical Human Psychology and Psychiatry, 10, 134–145, 2008.

63. Breggin, Peter "Practical Applications: 22 Guidelines for Counseling and Psychotherapy". Ethical Human Psychology and Psychiatry, 10, 43–57, 2008.

64. Breggin, Peter. "Antidepressant-induced suicide, violence, and mania: Risks for military personnel". Ethical Human Psychology and Psychiatry, 12, 111–121, 2010.

65. Breggin, Peter. "The FDA should test the safety of ECT machines". International Journal of Risk & Safety in Medicine, 22, 89–92, 2010.

66. Breggin, Peter. "Psychiatric drug-induced Chronic Brain Impairment (CBI): Implications for longterm treatment with psychiatric medication". International Journal of Risk & Safety in Medicine, 23: 193–200, 2011.

67. Breggin, Peter. "The Rights of Children and Parents in Regard to Children Receiving Psychiatric Drugs". Children & Society, 28, 231–241, 2014.

68. van Daalen-Smith, Cheryl; Adam, Simon; Breggin, Peter; and LeFrançois, Brenda A. "The Utmost Discretion: How Presumed Prudence Leaves Children Susceptible to Electroshock". Children & Society, 28, 205–217, 2014.

69. Breggin, Peter. "The biological evolution of guilt, shame and anxiety: A new theory of negative legacy emotions". Medical Hypotheses, 85, 17–24, 2015.

70. Breggin, Peter. "Understanding and helping people with hallucinations based on the theory of negative legacy emotions". Humanistic Psychologist, 43, 70–87, 2015.15

71. Breggin, Peter. "Rational Principles of Psychopharmacology for Therapists, Healthcare Providers and Clients". Journal of Contemporary Psychotherapy, 46, 1–13, 2016.

72. Breggin, Peter. "Extreme psychospiritual states versus organic brain disease: Bringing together science and the human factor". Journal of Humanistic Psychology, 59, 686–696, 2019.

73. Breggin, P. and Stolzer, J. "Psychological Helplessness and Feeling Undeserving of Love: Windows into Suffering and Healing". The Humanistic Psychologist, June 2020, 48 (2). InPress.

74. Breggin, Peter. "Moving past the vaccine/autism controversy – to examine potential vaccine neurological harms". International Journal of Risk & Safety in Medicine, 1 (2020) 1–15 1 DOI 10.3233/JRS-200052 IOS

== See also ==
- Wrongful involuntary commitment
- James Gottstein
- Peter Lehmann
- David Oaks
- Thomas Szasz
- Robert Whitaker
- Giorgio Antonucci
- Anatomy of an Epidemic
