= Big Pharma (book) =

2006 book by Jacky Law

- Author: Jacky Law
- Subject: Pharmaceutical industry
- Genre: Science writing, medicine, investigative journalism
- Publisher: Constable (UK), Carroll & Graf (US)
- Publication date: 16 January 2006
- Publication place: UK
- Pages: 256
- ISBN: 978-1845291396

Big Pharma: How the World's Biggest Drug Companies Control Illness is a 2006 book by British journalist Jacky Law. The book examines the history of the pharmaceutical industry.

Before the book, Law was the associate editor of Scrip Magazine.

== Reception ==
Ike Iheanacho writes about the book that "The author is clearly no great fan of the industry. But, refreshingly, she avoids the sort of lazy polemic that casts major pharmaceutical companies as an evil empire that continually foists its products on unwilling and unsuspecting healthcare professionals and patients."

== See also ==
- Bad Pharma (2012) by Ben Goldacre
- Side Effects (2008) by Alison Bass
- Lists about the pharmaceutical industry
