= Stuart A. Kirk =

Former social worker and author

Stuart A. Kirk holds the Marjorie Crump Chair in Social Welfare at UCLA and is a former psychiatric social worker. His research interests include mental health issues, particularly the creation and use of the Diagnostic and Statistical Manual of Mental Disorders (DSM). Kirk has authored, co-authored and edited many books, including most recently Mad Science: Psychiatric Coercion, Diagnosis, and Drugs (2013). He was former chief editor of the Social Work Research journal.

== Education ==
- B.A., Sociology, University of California, Berkeley;
- M.S.W., University of Illinois, Champaign-Urbana;
- D.S.W. in Social Welfare, University of California, Berkeley

== Books ==
- Kirk, S.A. and H. Kutchins. The Selling of DSM: The Rhetoric of Science in Psychiatry. Hawthorne, NY: Aldine de Gruyter, 1992.
- Kutchins, H. & S.A. Kirk. Making Us Crazy: DSM--the Psychiatric Bible and the Creation of Mental Disorder. NY: Free Press, 1997.
- Kirk, S.A., (Ed.), Social Work Research Methods: Building Knowledge for Practice. Washington, D.C.:NASW Press, 1999.
- Kirk, S.A. & Reid, W.J. Science and Social Work: A Critical Appraisal. New York: Columbia University Press, 2002.
- Kirk, S.A.,(Ed.), Mental Disorders in The Social Environment, NY: Columbia University Press, 2005.

== See also ==
- Controversies about psychiatry
