= Alison Bass =

American journalist and author

- Citizenship: American
- Occupations: professor; journalist
- Writing career
- Language: English
- Genre: non-fiction
- Subjects: mental health; corporate law; psychopharmacology; sex work; women's studies
- Notable works: Side Effects: A Prosecutor, a Whistleblower and a Bestselling Antidepressant on Trial
- Website: Alison Bass

Alison Bass is an American journalist and author of three books: her memoir, Brassy Broad: How one Journalist helped pave the way to #MeToo (2021); Getting Screwed: Sex Workers and the Law and Side Effects: A Prosecutor, A Whistleblower and a Bestselling Antidepressant on Trial. Side Effects won the National Association of Science Writers' Science in Society Award and its film rights were recently optioned.

== Biography ==
Bass was a longtime medical and science writer for The Boston Globe and was the first Globe reporter to break the story of a sexually abusive priest in Massachusetts, a decade before the Globe's Spotlight team published its story about the sexual abuse scandal in the Roman Catholic Archdiocese of Boston.

Her work has also appeared in the Los Angeles Times, Harvard University's Nieman Reports, The Miami Herald, Psychology Today, The Huffington Post and Technology Review, among other publications. She blogs regularly at She recently retired as associate professor of journalism at West Virginia University. Before coming to West Virginia, Bass taught at Brandeis University and Mount Holyoke College.

Her first book, Side Effects: A Prosecutor, a Whistleblower and a Bestselling Antidepressant on Trial, won the NASW Science in Society Award in 2009. Side Effects tells the true story of two women who exposed the deception behind the making of a bestselling drug and in doing so, examines financial ties and conflicts of interest among pharmaceutical companies, mental health advocacy groups, doctors, medical journals and the health care industry.

Her second nonfiction book, Getting Screwed: Sex Work and the Law, published in October 2015, weaves the true stories of sex workers with the latest research on prostitution. Her book argues that U.S. laws criminalizing prostitution are not only largely ineffective in curbing the sex trade, but create an atmosphere that encourages the exploitation of sex workers and violence against all women.

In 2007, she won an Alicia Patterson Fellowship to write Side Effects, which was published by Algonquin Books of Chapel Hill in 2008.
