= David Oaks =

American activist

David William Oaks
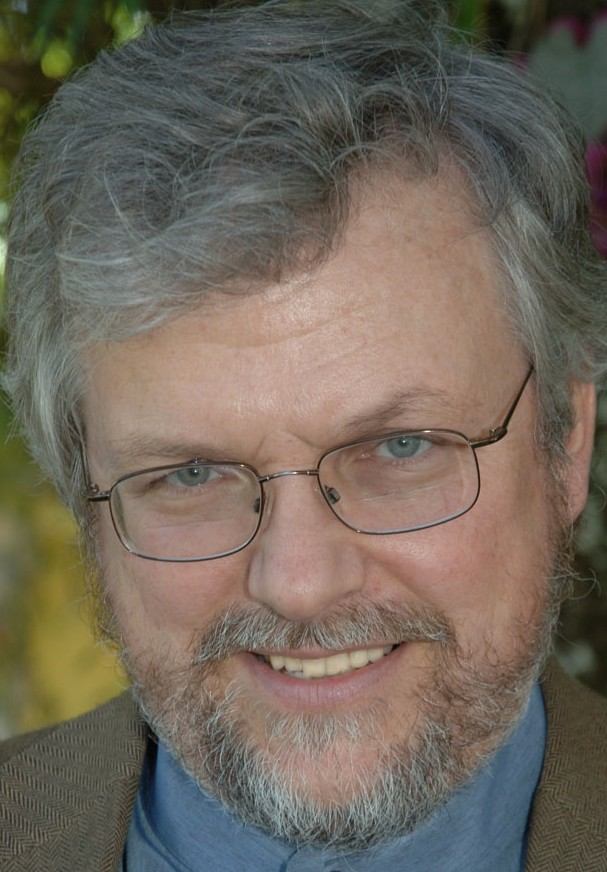
- David William Oaks, 2009
- Born: September 16, 1955 (age 70); Chicago, Illinois
- Education: Harvard University, St. Ignatius College Prep
- Occupation: revolutionary consultant
- Years active: 47
- Known for: Psychiatric Survivor Human Rights
- Notable work: Co-founder and former Executive Director of MindFreedom International
- Movement: psychiatric survivors movement

David William Oaks (born September 16, 1955, Chicago, Illinois) is a civil rights activist and co-founder and former executive director of Eugene, Oregon-based MindFreedom International.

== Career ==
David Oaks co-founded the organization MindFreedom International which includes psychiatric survivors and psychiatrists who reject the biomedical model that defines contemporary psychiatry. They believe that "mental illness is caused by severe emotional distress, often combined with lack of socialization", and they "decry the pervasive treatment with prescription drugs, sales of which have nearly doubled since 1998". Further, "they condemn the continued use of electro-convulsive therapy—or ECT, also known as electroshock—which they say violates patients' human rights."

Oaks has stated that the psychiatric drugs that patients take are often debilitating and frequently have harmful side effects, and people can recover without them. He has protested against drug companies and participated in hunger strikes to "demand proof that drugs can manage chemical imbalances in the brain".

Oaks has called for "a nonviolent revolution throughout the mental health system".

Oaks was institutionalized and forcibly medicated in the 1970s, while studying at Harvard University in Cambridge, Massachusetts, for what was diagnosed as schizophrenia. He has stated that he recovered by rejecting drugs and getting support from family and friends. Oaks "maintains his mental health with exercise, diet, peer counseling and wilderness trips — strategies that are well outside the mainstream thinking of psychiatrists and many patients". He has served on the board of directors for the United States International Council on Disability.

On December 2, 2012, Oaks fell from a ladder, suffered a broken neck and became paralyzed. He stepped down as executive director of MindFreedom in December 2012.

== Awards and honors ==
The United States International Council on Disability has listed some honors and awards received by Oaks:

- 1994 David J. Vail National Advocacy Award by National Mental Health Association of Minnesota.
- Project Censored award 2000.
- 2002 Distinguished Achievement Award from the International Center for the Study of Psychiatry and Psychology.
- Barrier Awareness Day 2003 Leadership Award.
- Utne Reader magazine named Oaks as one of "50 Visionaries" for 2009.
- Lane Independent Living Alliance award in 2011.

== Selected articles ==
- Oaks, David W. (1993). 'Antipsychiatrie und Politik – 20 Jahre Widerstand in den USA' (pp. 443–448). In Kerstin Kempker & Peter Lehmann (Eds.), Statt Psychiatrie. Berlin: Antipsychiatrieverlag; ISBN 3-925931-07-4.
- Oaks, David W. (2004). 'Mad movements: Chaordic paths in mental health activism toward a revolution of empowerment.' In National Research and Training Center's National Self-Determination and Psychiatric Disability Invitational Conference.
- Oaks, David W. (2007). 'MindFreedom International: Activism for Human Rights as the Basis for a Nonviolent Revolution in the Mental Health System'. In Peter Stastny & Peter Lehmann (Eds.), Alternatives Beyond Psychiatry (pp. 328–336). Berlin/Eugene/Shrewsbury: Peter Lehmann Publishing; ISBN 978-0-9545428-1-8 (UK); ISBN 978-0-9788399-1-8 (USA). E-Book in 2018.
- Oaks, David W. (2007). 'MindFreedom International – Engagement für Menschenrechte als Grundlage einer gewaltfreien Revolution im psychosozialen System'. In Peter Lehmann & Peter Stastny (Eds.), Statt Psychiatrie 2 (pp. 344–352). Berlin/Eugene/Shrewsbury: Antipsychiatrieverlag; ISBN 978-3-925931-38-3. E-Book in 2018.
- Oaks, David W. (2011). 'The moral imperative for dialogue with organizations of survivors of coerced psychiatric human rights violations' (pp. 187–209). In Thomas W. Kallert, Juan E. Mezzich and John Monahan (Eds.), Coercive Treatment in Psychiatry: Clinical, Legal and Ethical Aspects. John Wiley & Sons, Ltd; ISBN 978-0-470-66072-0.
- Oaks, David W. (2012). 'Whose Voices Should Be Heard?: the Role of Mental Health Consumers, Psychiatric Survivors and Families' (pp. 566–576). In Dudley, M., Silove, D., & Gale, F. (Eds.). Mental health and human rights: vision, praxis, and courage. Oxford University Press; ISBN 978-0199213962.

== See also ==
- Anatomy of an Epidemic
- Psychiatric survivors movement
- Anti-psychiatry
- Rethinking Madness
- Judi Chamberlin
- Peter Lehmann
- Involuntary commitment
