= Durham–Humphrey Amendment =

1951 US act on medications

- Long title: 1951 Food, Drug, and Cosmetics Act Amendments
- Enacted by: the 82nd United States Congress

Citations
- Public law: 82-215
- Statutes at Large: 65 Stat. 648

Codification
- Acts amended: Federal Food, Drug, and Cosmetic Act
- Acts repealed: Pure Food and Drug Act
- Titles amended: 21 U.S.C.: Food and Drugs
- U.S.C. sections amended: 21 U.S.C. ch. 9 § 301 et seq.

Legislative history
- Signed into law by President Harry S. Truman on October 26, 1951

The Durham–Humphrey Amendment explicitly defined two specific categories for medications, legend (prescription) and over-the-counter (OTC). This amendment was co-sponsored by then Senator (and later Vice President) Hubert H. Humphrey Jr., who was a pharmacist in South Dakota before beginning his political career. The other sponsor of this amendment was Carl Durham, a pharmacist representing North Carolina in the House of Representatives.

The bill requires any drug that is habit-forming or potentially harmful to be dispensed under the supervision of a health practitioner as a prescription drug and must carry the statement, "Caution: Federal law prohibits dispensing without a prescription."

Until this law, there was no requirement that any drug be labeled for sale by prescription only. The amendment defined prescription drugs as those unsafe for self-medication and which should therefore be used only under a doctor's supervision.

Legend drugs must be dispensed with direct medical supervision, but over-the-counter drugs can be purchased and used without a prescription.

The law also legalized verbal transmission of prescriptions and provided for the legal right of a pharmacist to refill prescriptions as indicated in a provider's initial prescription.

== See also ==
- Federal Food, Drug, and Cosmetic Act
- Kefauver-Harris Amendment
- Food and Drug Administration
