= Anatomy of an Epidemic =

Work by Robert Whitaker

Anatomy of an Epidemic: Magic Bullets, Psychiatric Drugs, and the Astonishing Rise of Mental Illness in America
- Author: Robert Whitaker
- Language: English
- Subject: Psychiatry
- Publisher: Crown Publishing Group
- Publication date: 2010
- Publication place: United States
- Media type: Print
- ISBN: 978-0-307-45241-2
- OCLC: 429022293
- Dewey Decimal: 616.89

Anatomy of an Epidemic: Magic Bullets, Psychiatric Drugs, and the Astonishing Rise of Mental Illness in America is a book by Robert Whitaker published in 2010 by Crown. Whitaker asks why the number of Americans who receive government disability for mental illness approximately doubled since 1987.

In the book, Whitaker tries to answer that question and examines the long-term outcomes for the mentally ill in the U.S.

== Synopsis ==
=== Magic bullets ===
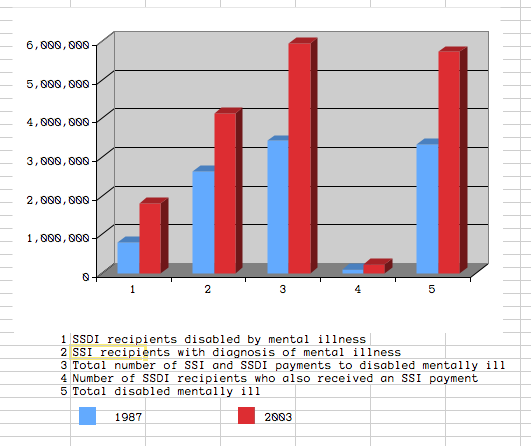
Number of Americans who received SSDI and SSI for mental disability in 1987 (blue) when Eli Lilly and Company introduced the antidepressive drug Prozac, compared to 2003 (red)

Whitaker begins by reviewing the discovery of antipsychotics, benzodiazepines and antidepressants. These were discovered as side effects during research for antihistamines (specifically promethazine), gram negative antibiotics (specifically mephenesin) and the anti-tuberculosis agents isoniazid and iproniazid respectively. The psychiatric mechanisms of action of these drugs were not known at the time and these were initially called major tranquilizers (now typical antipsychotics) due to their induction of "euphoric quietude"; minor tranquilizers (now benzodiazepines) and psychic energizers (now antidepressants) due to patients "dancing in the wards." These compounds were developed during a period of growth for the pharmaceutical industry bolstered by the 1951 Durham-Humphrey Amendment, giving physicians monopolistic prescribing rights thus aligning the interests of physicians and pharmaceutical companies. This also followed the industry's development of "magic bullets" that treat people with, for example, diabetes, which according to Whitaker provided an analogy to sell the idea of these drugs to the public. It was not until many years later, after the mechanisms of these drugs were determined, that the serotonergic hypothesis of depression and dopaminergic hypothesis of schizophrenia were developed to fall in line with the drug's mechanisms. According to Whitaker's analysis of the primary literature, lower levels of serotonin and higher levels of dopamine "have proved to be true in patients WITH prior exposure to antidepressants or antipsychotics (ie as homeostatic mechanisms) but NOT in patients without prior exposure."

Whitaker further criticizes the magic bullet theory by attacking the historical notion that the "invention of the antipsychotic Thorazine" emptied the asylums. His case begins by showing that during the late 1940s and 1950s ~75% of cases admitted for first episode schizophrenia recovered to the community by approximately 3 years (Thorazine was not released until 1955). He then notes that the arrival of Thorazine did not improve discharge rates in the 1950s for people newly diagnosed with schizophrenia. In fact, based on the only large scale first episode schizophrenia study of this era, 88% of those who were not treated were discharged within eighteen months compared to 74% of neuroleptic treated. This is additionally evidenced by the fact that when Thorazine was introduced in 1955 there were 267 thousand schizophrenia patients in state and county mental hospitals, and eight years later, there were 253 thousand, thus indicating that the advent of neuroleptics barely budged the number of hospitalized patients. What he argues actually cleared the asylums was the beginning of Medicare and Medicaid in 1965. These programs provided federal subsidies for nursing home care but no such subsidy for care in state mental hospitals, and so the states, seeking to save money, began sending their chronic patients to nursing homes.

=== Psychiatric drugs ===
Whitaker acknowledges that psychiatric medications do sometimes work but believes that they must be used in a "selective, cautious manner. It should be understood that they’re not fixing any chemical imbalances. And honestly, they should be used on a short-term basis."

Whitaker traces the effects of what looks like an iatrogenic epidemic: the drugs that patients receive can perturb their normal brain function.

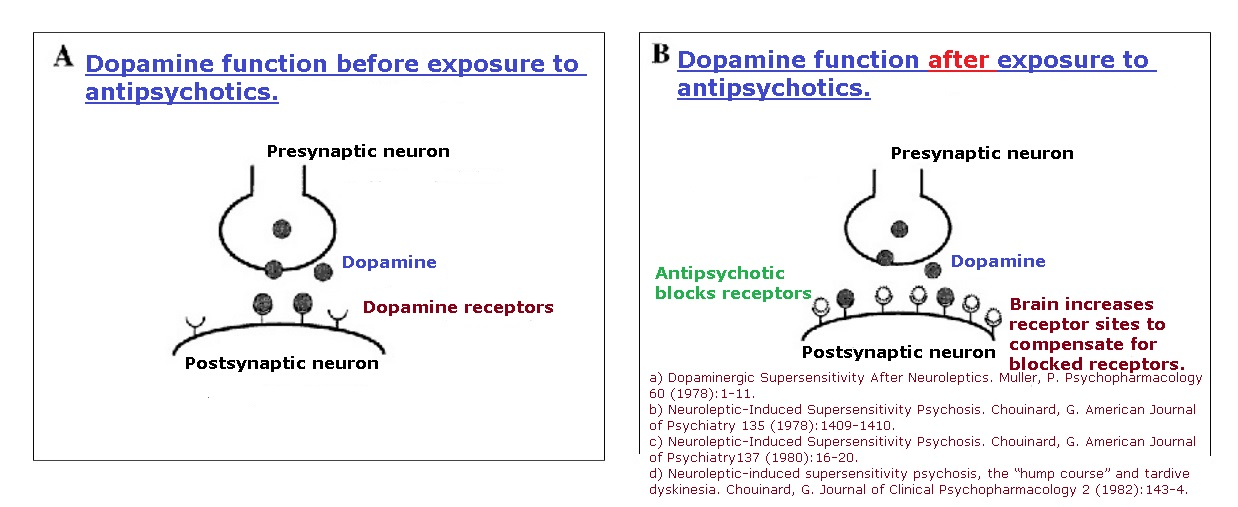
A symbolic graphic of the brain's dopamine function before and after antipsychotics

Whitaker suggests that the "wonder drug" glow around the second generation psychotropics has long since disappeared. He views the "hyping" of the top-selling atypical antipsychotics as "one of the more embarrassing episodes in psychiatry's history, as one government study after another failed to find that they were any better than the first-generation anti-psychotics."

Whitaker speaks warmly of Open Dialogue, an organisation of care documented by professor psychologist Jaakko Seikkula at Keropudas Hospital in Tornio in Lapland where drugs are given to patients only on a limited basis. According to Whitaker, the district has the lowest per capita spending on mental health of all health districts in Finland.

=== Children ===
Whitaker sees that children are vulnerable to being prescribed a lifetime of drugs. As the author says, a psychiatrist and parents may give a child a "cocktail" to force him or her to behave. Then when this child reaches the age of eighteen, Whitaker says the child often becomes a disabled adult.

== Review of data and statistics ==
Whitaker spent a year and a half researching for this book, and maintains a website listing some relevant studies.

== Reception and media coverage ==
External videos
- Presentation by Whitaker on Anatomy of an Epidemic, April 22, 2010, C-SPAN

Whitaker did interviews with Salon and The Boston Globe during the release of this book. A review by sleep researcher Dennis Rosen for The Boston Globe concludes that "although extensively researched and drawing upon hundreds of sources, the gaps in his theory remain too large for him to succeed in making a convincing argument", and compares Whitaker to Thabo Mbeki and AIDS denialism. The book received positive reviews from New Scientist, The Record, Time magazine, and Salon.

Over a year after the book was published, Marcia Angell, former editor of The New England Journal of Medicine, published a two-part review of Whitaker's and other books in The New York Review of Books

Whitaker presented his views at a psychiatric Grand Rounds at Massachusetts General Hospital on January 13, 2011, where his data and approach were critiqued by psychiatrist Andrew Nierenberg. Additional criticism has come from psychiatrist and author Daniel Carlat. Whitaker has responded to critics on his website.

== Awards ==
In April 2011, Investigative Reporters and Editors (IRE) announced that the book had won its award as the best investigative journalism book of 2010 stating, "this book provides an in-depth exploration of medical studies and science and intersperses compelling anecdotal examples. In the end, Whitaker rejects the conventional wisdom of treatment of mental illness with drugs."

== See also ==
- Mad in America (2002) by Robert Whitaker
- Side Effects (2008) by Alison Bass
- Rethinking Madness book by Paris Williams
- Evidence-based medicine

== Bibliography ==
- Whitaker, Robert (April 13, 2010). Anatomy of an Epidemic: Magic Bullets, Psychiatric Drugs, and the Astonishing Rise of Mental Illness in America. Crown (Random House). ISBN 978-0-307-45241-2.
