= Robert Whitaker (author) =

American journalist

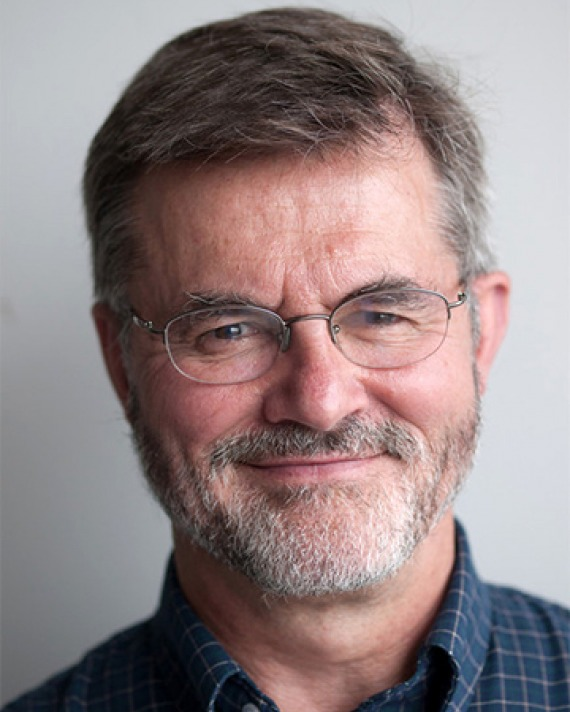
Robert Whitaker

Robert Whitaker is an American journalist and author, writing primarily about medicine, science, and history. He is the author of five books, three of which cover the history and practice of modern psychiatry. He has won numerous awards for science writing, and in 1998 he was part of a team writing for the Boston Globe that was shortlisted for the 1999 Pulitzer Prize for Public Service for a series of articles questioning the ethics of psychiatric research in which unsuspecting patients were given drugs expected to heighten their psychosis. He is the founder and publisher of Mad in America, a webzine critical of the modern psychiatric establishment.

== Career ==
Whitaker was a medical writer at the Albany Times Union newspaper in Albany, New York, from 1989 to 1994. In 1992, he was a Knight Science Journalism fellow at MIT. Following that, he became director of publications at Harvard Medical School. In 1994, he co-founded a publishing company, CenterWatch, that covered the pharmaceutical clinical trials industry. CenterWatch was acquired by Medical Economics, a division of The Thomson Corporation, in 1998.

In 2002, USA Today published Whitaker's article "Mind drugs may hinder recovery" in its editorial/opinion section. In 2004, Whitaker published a paper in the non-peer-reviewed journal Medical Hypotheses entitled "The case against antipsychotic drugs: a 50-year record of doing more harm than good". In 2005, he published a paper entitled Anatomy of an Epidemic: Psychiatric Drugs and the Astonishing Rise of Mental Illness in America in the peer-reviewed journal Ethical Human Psychology and Psychiatry. In his book Anatomy of an Epidemic, published in 2010, Whitaker continued his work. He has spoken in a Brazilian international event about the Psychiatric Drug Epidemic in 2018.

== Mad in America ==
He has written on and off for the Boston Globe and in 2001, he wrote his first book Mad in America about psychiatric research and medications, the domains of some of his earlier journalism. He appeared in the film Take These Broken Wings: Recovery from Schizophrenia Without Medication released in 2008, a film detailing the pitfalls of administering medication for the illness.

== Anatomy of an Epidemic ==
An Investigative Reporters and Editors, Inc. (IRE) 2010 book award winner for best investigative journalism, Whittaker's book investigates why the number of people with mental illness in the United States receiving Supplemental Security Income or Social Security Disability Insurance disability checks keeps rising despite what he calls the "psychopharmacological revolution." Whitaker's main thesis is that psychopharmaceuticals work well to curb acute symptoms, but individuals with prolonged treatment courses often end up more disabled than they were before treatment initiation. Whittaker notes that several landmark studies from the 1970s laid the groundwork for changes in psychiatric treatment. In the 1980s, pharmaceutical companies like Eli Lilly, alongside the American Psychiatric Association, began to promote second-generation antidepressants and antipsychotics for psychiatric patients more actively. Many leading academic psychiatrists served as influential advocates for these pharmaceutical companies and received millions of dollars in compensation.

== Psychiatry Under the Influence ==
In 2015 Whitaker co-authored another book about psychiatric research and medications. The book is critical of the drug industry influence on the field of psychiatry.

== Awards and honors ==
Articles that Whitaker co-wrote won the 1998 George Polk Award for Medical Writing and the 1998 National Association of Science Writers’ Science in Society Journalism Award for best magazine article.

A 1998 Boston Globe article series he co-wrote on psychiatric research was a finalist for the 1999 Pulitzer Prize for Public Service.

In April 2011, IRE announced that Anatomy of an Epidemic had won its award as the best investigative journalism book of 2010 stating, "this book provides an in-depth exploration of medical studies and science and intersperses compelling anecdotal examples. In the end, Whitaker punches holes in the conventional wisdom of treatment of mental illness with drugs."

== Books ==
- Whitaker, Robert (2002). Mad In America: Bad Science, Bad Medicine, And The Enduring Mistreatment Of The Mentally Ill. Basic Books. ISBN 978-0-7382-0385-0.
- Whitaker, Robert (2004). The Mapmaker's Wife: A True Tale of Love, Murder, and Survival in the Amazon. Basic Books. ISBN 978-0-7382-0808-4.
- Whitaker, Robert (2008). On the Laps of Gods: The Red Summer of 1919 and the Struggle for Justice that Remade a Nation. Crown Publishers. ISBN 978-0-307-33982-9.
- Whitaker, Robert (2010). Anatomy of an Epidemic: Magic Bullets, Psychiatric Drugs, and the Astonishing Rise of Mental Illness in America. Crown Publishers. ISBN 978-0-307-45241-2.
- Whitaker, R.; Cosgrove, L. (2015). Psychiatry Under the Influence: Institutional Corruption, Social Injury, and Prescriptions for Reform. Palgrave Macmillan US. ISBN 978-1-137-50692-4.
