= Gradualism =

Philosophy of step-by-step proceeding

Gradualism, from the Latin gradus ("step"), is a hypothesis, a theory or a tenet which holds or accepts that change comes about gradually, or that variation is gradual in nature and happens over time as opposed to in large steps. Uniformitarianism, incrementalism, and reformism are similar concepts. The term also appears as "gradualness".

Gradualism can also refer to desired, controlled change in society, institutions, or policies. For example, social democrats and democratic socialists see the emergence of a socialist society as achieved through gradualism.

== Geology and biology ==
In the natural sciences, gradualism is the theory which holds that profound change is the cumulative product of slow but continuous processes, often contrasted with catastrophism. The theory was proposed in 1795 by James Hutton, a Scottish geologist, and was later incorporated into Charles Lyell's theory of uniformitarianism. Tenets from both theories were applied to biology and formed the basis of early evolutionary theory.

Charles Darwin was influenced by Lyell's Principles of Geology, which explained both uniformitarian methodology and theory. Using uniformitarianism, which states that one cannot make an appeal to any force or phenomenon which cannot presently be observed (see catastrophism), Darwin theorized that the evolutionary process must occur gradually, not in saltations, since saltations are not presently observed, and extreme deviations from the usual phenotypic variation would be more likely to be selected against.

Gradualism is often confused with the concept of phyletic gradualism. It is a term coined by Stephen Jay Gould and Niles Eldredge to contrast with their model of punctuated equilibrium, which is gradualist itself, but argues that most evolution is marked by long periods of evolutionary stability (called stasis), which is punctuated by rare instances of branching evolution.

Phyletic gradualism is a model of evolution which theorizes that most speciation is slow, uniform, and gradual. When evolution occurs in this mode, it is usually by the steady transformation of a whole species into a new one (through a process called anagenesis). In this view no clear line of demarcation exists between an ancestral species and a descendant species, unless splitting occurs.

Punctuated gradualism is a microevolutionary hypothesis that refers to a species that has "relative stasis over a considerable part of its total duration [and] underwent periodic, relatively rapid, morphologic change that did not lead to lineage branching". It is one of the three common models of evolution. While the traditional model of palaeontology, the phylogenetic model, states that features evolved slowly without any direct association with speciation, the relatively newer and more controversial idea of punctuated equilibrium claims that major evolutionary changes do not happen over a gradual period but in localized, rare, rapid events of branching speciation. Punctuated gradualism is considered to be a variation of these models, lying somewhere in between the phyletic gradualism model and the punctuated equilibrium model. It states that speciation is not needed for a lineage to rapidly evolve from one equilibrium to another but may show rapid transitions between long-stable states.

== Politics and society ==
In politics, gradualism is the hypothesis that social change can be achieved in small, discrete increments rather than in abrupt strokes such as revolutions or uprisings. Gradualism is one of the defining features of political liberalism and reformism.

Gradualism in social change implemented through reformist means is a moral principle to which the Fabian Society is committed. In a more general way, reformism is the assumption that gradual changes through and within existing institutions can ultimately change a society's fundamental economic system and political structures; and that an accumulation of reforms can lead to the emergence of an entirely different economic system and form of society than present-day capitalism. That hypothesis of social change grew out of opposition to revolutionary socialism, which contends that revolution is necessary for fundamental structural changes to occur.

In socialist politics and within the socialist movement, the concept of gradualism is frequently distinguished from reformism, with the former insisting that short-term goals need to be formulated and implemented in such a way that they inevitably lead into long-term goals. It is most commonly associated with the libertarian socialist concept of dual power and is seen as a middle way between reformism and revolutionism.

=== Critique ===
Martin Luther King Jr. was opposed to the idea of gradualism as a method of eliminating segregation. The United States government wanted to try to integrate African Americans and European Americans slowly into the same society, but many believed it was a way for the government to put off actually doing anything about racial segregation:

This is no time to engage in the luxury of cooling off or to take the tranquilizing drug of gradualism. Now is the time to make real the promises of democracy.

— Martin Luther King Jr.'s "I Have a Dream" speech, delivered August 28, 1963 at the Lincoln Memorial in Washington, D.C.

=== Conspiracy theories ===
In the terminology of NWO-related speculations, gradualism refers to the gradual implementation of a totalitarian world government.

== Linguistics and language change ==
In linguistics, language change is seen as gradual, the product of chain reactions and subject to cyclic drift. The view that creole languages are the product of catastrophism is heavily disputed.

== Religion ==
=== Christianity ===
In Catholic moral theology, the "law of gradualness", the law of graduality or gradualism, is the notion that people improve their relationship with God and grow in the virtues gradually, and do not jump to perfection in a single step. It is reflected in the writings of Pope John Paul II, Benedict XIV and Francis.

=== Buddhism, Theravada, and Yoga ===
Gradualism is the approach of certain schools of Buddhism and other Eastern philosophies (e.g. Theravada or Yoga), that enlightenment can be achieved step by step, through an arduous practice. The opposite approach, that insight is attained all at once, is called subitism. The debate on the issue was very important to the history of the development of Zen, which rejected gradualism, and to the establishment of the opposite approach within the Tibetan Buddhism, after the Debate of Samye. It was continued in other schools of Indian and Chinese philosophy.

== Philosophy ==
Contradictorial gradualism is the paraconsistent treatment of fuzziness developed by Lorenzo Peña, which regards true contradictions as situations wherein a state of affairs enjoys only partial existence.

== See also ==
- Accelerationism
- Boiling frog
- Catastrophism
- Evolution
- Incrementalism
- Normalization (sociology)
- Punctuated equilibrium
- Reformism
- Saltation
- Uniformitarianism
