= Horace Freeland Judson =

American historian of molecular biology (1931–2011)

- Born: 21 April 1931; Manhattan, New York, United States
- Died: 6 May 2011 (aged 80); Baltimore, Maryland, US
- Occupation: Historian
- Known for: The Eighth Day of Creation; The Great Betrayal: Fraud in Science The book surveys many cases where scientific misconduct by aberrant scientists has threatened the reliability and foundations of the scientific process.
- Children: Olivia Judson; Nicholas Judson; Grace Judson

Horace Freeland Judson (April 21, 1931 – May 6, 2011) was a journalist and later more prominently a historian of molecular biology. He authored several books, including The Eighth Day of Creation, a history of molecular biology, and The Great Betrayal: Fraud in Science, an examination of the deliberate manipulation of scientific data.

== Life and career ==
Horace Freeland Judson was born on 21 April 1931, in Manhattan, New York. He contracted polio at the age of 13, and the disease left him with a withered right arm. Judson matriculated at the University of Chicago at age 15 and graduated with a bachelor's degree in 1948, and worked for seven years for Time magazine as a European correspondent in London and Paris. He subsequently wrote for The New Yorker, Harper's, and Nature among others. Judson spent nine years on the faculty of Johns Hopkins University and then four years as a research scholar at Stanford University. He was the director of the now defunct Center for History of Recent Science and a Research Professor of History at George Washington University. In 1987 Judson was awarded a MacArthur Fellowship.

The Eighth Day of Creation arose out of Judson's acquaintance with Max Perutz. In 1968 came the idea of a book about the discovery of the structures of cellular macromolecules. Following a discussion with Jacques Monod in 1969, Judson expanded his planned book to a general history of molecular biology. The result is based on interviews of over 100 scientists, cross-checked and re-interviewed over a period of seven years. The book was partially serialized in three issues of The New Yorker in November and December 1978. Following the publication of the book, Judson deposited the tapes and transcripts of the interviews at the American Philosophical Society in Philadelphia.

Judson appears in a key scene in Dont Look Back, D. A. Pennebaker's documentary film about Bob Dylan, in which Dylan taunts him and expresses disdain for Time during an interview for the magazine before a concert at the Royal Albert Hall. Pennebaker does not believe the tirade was planned, but notes that Dylan eventually backed off, not wanting to come across as being too cruel. However, Judson believed the confrontation was contrived to make the sequence more entertaining. He reflected: "That evening, I went to the concert. My opinion then and now was that the music was unpleasant, the lyrics inflated, and Dylan, a self-indulgent whining show off".

== Personal life ==
Judson's first marriage ended in divorce. His second wife, Penelope Jones, died in 1993. His oldest daughter, Grace Judson, is a leadership consultant and trainer. After her successful 25-year corporate career, she won the title of Fastest Knitter in America in 2002, appearing on Good Morning America in October of that year. His younger daughter, Olivia Judson, is a science journalist and currently a research fellow in evolutionary biology at Imperial College London; she is also the author of the popular science book Dr Tatiana's Sex Advice to All Creation. His younger son, Nicholas Judson, was a scientist at the J. Craig Venter Institute in Rockville, Maryland, but left science to pursue a new career as a self-employed artist.

Judson was an atheist.

== Publications ==
=== Articles ===
- Judson, H. (1975). "Fearful of science: After Copernicus, after Darwin, after Freud comes molecular biology. Is nothing sacred?". Harper's. 250 (1498): 32+. PMID 11664517.
- Judson, H. (1975). "Fearful of science: Who shall watch the scientists?". Harper's. 250 (1501): 70–72+. PMID 11661234.
- Judson, H. (1980). "Reflections on the historiography of molecular biology". Minerva. 18 (3): 369–421. doi:10.1007/bf01096950. PMID 11610977. S2CID 46542692.
- Judson, H. (1983). "Thumbprints in our clay: Unraveling the controversy over genetic engineering". New Republic. Vol. 189, no. 12–13. pp. 12–17. PMID 11651757.
- Judson, H.; MacKay, I. (1992). "History in the Bay of Naples". Immunology Today. 13 (11): 459–461. doi:10.1016/0167-5699(92)90076-j. PMID 1362059.
- Judson, H. (1993). "Frederick Sanger, Erwin Chargaff, and the metamorphosis of specificity". Gene. 135 (1–2): 19–23. doi:10.1016/0378-1119(93)90043-3. PMID 8276259.
- Judson, H. (1994). "Structural transformations of the sciences and the end of peer review". JAMA: The Journal of the American Medical Association. 272 (2): 92–94. doi:10.1001/jama.272.2.92. PMID 8015139.
- Judson, H. (1995). "The world we have lost". Annals of the New York Academy of Sciences. 758 (1): 427–440. Bibcode:1995NYASA.758..427J. doi:10.1111/j.1749-6632.1995.tb24847.x. PMID 7625708. S2CID 36632778.
- Judson, H. F. (2001). "Talking about the genome". Nature. 409 (6822): 769. Bibcode:2001Natur.409..769J. doi:10.1038/35057406. PMID 11236976. S2CID 4766658.
- Judson, H. F. (2003). ""The Greatest Surprise for Everyone" – Notes on the 50th Anniversary of the Double Helix". New England Journal of Medicine. 348 (17): 1712–1714. doi:10.1056/NEJMon035356. PMID 12711749.
- Judson, H. F. (2004). "First among Equals – Francis Crick". New England Journal of Medicine. 351 (9): 858. doi:10.1056/NEJMp048233. PMID 15329422.
- Judson, H. F. (2006). "The theorist". Nature. 443 (7114): 917–918. Bibcode:2006Natur.443..917J. doi:10.1038/443917a.
- Judson, Horace Freeland (14 November 2006). "The Glimmering Promise of Gene Therapy". Technology Review.

=== Books ===
- Heroin Addiction: What Americans Can Learn from the English Experience (1975). Vintage Books, ISBN 0-394-72017-2
- The Eighth Day of Creation: Makers of the Revolution in Biology (1979). Touchstone Books, ISBN 0-671-22540-5. 2nd edition: Cold Spring Harbor Laboratory Press, 1996 paperback: ISBN 0-87969-478-5.
- The Search for Solutions (1982). Holt Rinehart & Winston, ISBN 0-03-043771-7
- Science in Crisis at the Millennium (1999). New York Academy of Sciences, ISBN 1-57331-106-5
- The Great Betrayal: Fraud in Science (2004). Harcourt, ISBN 0-15-100877-9

== See also ==
- List of books about the politics of science
- Plastic Fantastic: How the Biggest Fraud in Physics Shook the Scientific World
