= Science, Money, and Politics =

2001 book by Daniel Greenberg

Science, Money, and Politics: Political Triumph and Ethical Erosion
- Author: Daniel S. Greenberg
- Publication date: 2001

Science, Money, and Politics: Political Triumph and Ethical Erosion is a 2001 book by Daniel S. Greenberg. The book explores science policy and politics over the past forty years, focusing particular on big science, university research centers, government laboratories, scientific societies, and funding agencies.

== See also ==
- List of books about the politics of science
- Science in Society
