= Bending Science =

Book by Thomas O. McGarity and Wendy E. Wagner

Bending Science: How special interests corrupt public health research
- Author: Thomas O. McGarity and Wendy E. Wagner
- Publisher: Harvard University Press
- Publication date: 2008

Bending Science: How special interests corrupt public health research is a 2008 book by Thomas O. McGarity and Wendy E. Wagner, published by Harvard University Press. Bending Science explores the ways that science is manipulated in the process of making public policy and the law. It has been called a "fascinating and troubling investigation." The authors present a collection of case studies, undertaken largely by industry and designed to distort the scientific process.

Thomas McGarity and Wendy Wagner are both University of Texas law professors.

== See also ==
- List of books about the politics of science
