= Science In Society =

2004 book by Massimiano Bucchi

Science In Society: An Introduction to Social Studies of Science (ISBN 0415321999) is a 2004 book by Massimiano Bucchi. The book explains how science works, what sociologists find to be of interest, and how scientific knowledge is produced. There are chapters on the relevance of science to contemporary life, Kuhn's work and its modern relevance, as well as the role of scientific communication.

== See also ==
- List of books about the politics of science
