= Plastic Fantastic =

2009 book by Eugenie Samuel Reich

Plastic Fantastic: How the Biggest Fraud in Physics Shook the Scientific World
- Author: Eugenie Samuel Reich
- Language: English
- Genre: Non-fiction
- Publisher: Palgrave MacMillan
- Publication date: 2009
- ISBN: 978-0-230-22467-4

Plastic Fantastic: How the Biggest Fraud in Physics Shook the Scientific World is a 2009 book by U.S.-based science reporter Eugenie Samuel Reich.

== Plot ==
In Plastic Fantastic, Reich investigates how Jan Hendrik Schön, a young physicist working in the field of advanced microelectronics at Bell Labs, was able to repeatedly fabricate scientific results to mislead his collaborators, journal editors, and the scientific community. The book is based on interviews with 126 scientists.

The book carries ISBN 978-0-230-22467-4, and was initially published by Palgrave MacMillan.

== See also ==
- List of books about the politics of science
- The Great Betrayal: Fraud In Science
- Scientific misconduct
