= The New Politics of Science =

1984 book by David Dickson

- Author: David Dickson
- Language: English
- Genre: Non-fiction
- Publication date: 1984

The New Politics of Science is a 1984 book by David Dickson. The book is about the political relationships which affect science funding. Dickson argues that decisions about science are becoming concentrated in a closed circle of corporate, banking, and military leaders and that America's scientific enterprise is being steadily removed from public decision-making.

Dickson was Washington correspondent for the British weekly journal Nature and European correspondent for the journal Science.

== See also ==
- List of books about the politics of science
