= Science Under Siege =

1998 book by Todd Wilkinson

Science Under Siege: The Politicians' War on Nature and Truth
- Author: Todd Wilkinson
- Language: English
- Genre: Non-fiction
- Publication date: 1998

Science Under Siege: The Politicians' War on Nature and Truth is a 1998 book by journalist Todd Wilkinson. Wilkinson describes the careers of a variety of publicly employed scientists who, in the course of their work for government agencies, found habitat degradation, threatened species, or other decline in availability of a natural resource. When they expressed their views that certain activities must be scaled back or areas protected, they met with poor job performance ratings, hostility from their supervisors, transfers out of the region, and in many cases a severely damaged career. Science is "under siege" in these cases because many of the researchers were told to modify their scientific reports so that commercial uses or environmentally destructive activities could continue.

== See also ==
- List of books about the politics of science
