= Daniel S. Greenberg =

American journalist (1931–2020)

- Born: May 5, 1931; Brooklyn, New York, U.S.
- Died: March 9, 2020 (aged 88); Washington, D.C., U.S.
- Education: Columbia University (BA)
- Occupations: Journalist; editor; writer
- Relatives: Jack Greenberg (brother)

Daniel Sheldon Greenberg (May 5, 1931 – March 9, 2020) was an American journalist, editor, and author.

== Education and early career ==
Greenberg was born in Brooklyn in 1931. His brother was the civil rights lawyer Jack Greenberg. They grew up in Bensonhurst, Brooklyn and near Mosholu Parkway in the Bronx.

He graduated from Columbia University (AB) in 1953 and served in the US Navy (LT JG) 1953–1955. He was a reporter on the Wilmington, Delaware, Journal-Every Evening, 1955–1957, and on the Washington Post, 1957–1961. In 1961 he was awarded a Congressional Fellowship by the American Political Science Association, after which he joined the "News and Comment" section of Science, journal of the American Association for the Advancement of Science, where he was the first news editor and also was European correspondent, based in London, 1968–1970. In 1971 Greenberg founded Science & Government Report, a newsletter which he edited and published until 1997 when it was acquired by John Wiley & Sons.

== Journalism career ==
At Science and at Science & Government Report Greenberg gained recognition for bringing a new style of reporting to the coverage of science, viewing it as among many claimants for government support, rather than as a politically detached enterprise:

Over the years, Mr. Greenberg has been an often lonely voice championing the public's right to know how wisely scientists were spending its hard-earned money. It is probably fair to say that, through the medium of his newsletter, Science and Government Report, Mr. Greenberg pretty well invented a new way to cover big science—as a form of government spending no different, in budgetary terms, from defense procurement or agricultural support.

— , The Economist

While at Science, Greenberg created the mythical character Dr. Grant Swinger, Director of the Center for the Absorption of Federal Funds. Q&As with Dr. Swinger and policy papers attributed to him continued to be published in Science & Government Report and other periodicals for which Greenberg wrote, and was later published in a collection titled The Grant Swinger Papers (out of print, now in preparation for a new edition).

Upon Greenberg's resignation from the Science News and Comment staff in 1970, The Washington Post observed that "Greenberg ... more than any other man on Science has helped to build its circulation to an all-time high of 160,000. In his nine years on the magazine, he wrote and directed numerous exclusives on the science beat" (The Washington Post, November 29, 1970, "Scientists Split by Seaborg Candidacy").

== Books ==
Greenberg's The Politics of Pure Science published in 1968 evoked strong reactions, pro and con, in the popular and scientific press. In The New York Times Book Review, Robert K. Merton described the work as

"a book of consequence about science as one of the more consequential social institutions in the modern world. It is one that could be understood and should be read by the President, legislators, scientists and the rest of us ordinary folks."

He described the author as "an informed and reflective newsman of the first rank, capable of combining lively journalism with careful scholarship."

Contrary reviews of The Politics of Pure Science were plentiful. Frank T. McClure, Director of the Applied Physics Laboratory at Johns Hopkins University, wrote in Science that the book

"might best be described as a historical novel, written in the reportorial style, with titillating tidbits liberally dispersed among important facts [...]"

"The author," McClure added, "uses the term 'machinations' repeatedly to describe the successful advocacy of presumably worthy causes... The overall effect is to demean, and few men or institutions went into this book but came out poorer."

Following its publication in the U.S., The Politics of Pure Science was published in the UK in a Penguin edition in 1969 under the title The Politics of American Science, under the original title; and in an edition published by the University of Chicago Press in 1999, with introductions by John Maddox and Steven Shapin. Describing the book as "a model of lucidity," Maddox stated that

"Greenberg's contributions to Science throughout the 1960s had an electrifying effect on rival publications, which followed Greenberg as best as they could."

Shapin described The Politics of Pure Science as "a document of unique importance [that] reminds us how consequential science journalism of this kind and quality can be."

In 2001, Greenberg published an indictment of the way that the United States government spent money on science in Science, Money, and Politics, which received broad notice.

Greenberg's later books included: Science for Sale: The perils, rewards, and delusions of campus capitalism (2007) and a satirical novel, Tech Transfer: Science, money, love, and the ivory tower (2010).

== Other publications ==
Throughout his science-writing career, Greenberg was a prolific contributor to popular and professional publications. From 1972 to 2003, he wrote a syndicated column that appeared in The Washington Post and many other newspapers. He was also a frequent contributor to the British New Scientist, The Saturday Review, and MIT Technology Review. From 1974 to 1980, he wrote a Washington column for the New England Journal of Medicine, and from 1993 to 2002 a column for the British journal The Lancet.

== Honors and awards ==
- 1970 Columbia University Medal for Excellence
- 1988 National Press Foundation Award for Investigative Journalism by Newsletters
- 2005 Investigator Award in Health Policy Research from the Robert Wood Johnson Foundation for

== Appointments ==
- Research Fellow, Department of History of Science and Medicine, Johns Hopkins University, 1965.
- Regents Lecturer, University of California, Santa Barbara, 1971.
- Chairman, Fund for Investigative Journalism, 1986.
- Visiting Scholar, Department of History of Science, Medicine, and Technology, Johns Hopkins University, 1999.
- Guest Scholar, The Brookings Institution, 2005.
