= Olivia Judson =

Evolutionary biologist and science writer

- Born: 1970 (age 55–56)
- Other name: Dr. Tatiana
- Education: Stanford University; University of Oxford (DPhil)
- Known for: Dr Tatiana's Sex Advice to All Creation
- Scientific career
- Workplaces: Imperial College London; The Economist; Freie Universität Berlin
- Thesis: Parasites, sex and genetic variation in a model metapopulation (1994)
- Doctoral advisor: W. D. Hamilton
- Website: www.oliviajudson.com

Olivia P. Judson (born 1970) is an evolutionary biologist and science writer. She is a former journalist for The Economist, a former online columnist for The New York Times and has written for a number of other publications, including National Geographic, The Atlantic and the Financial Times. Judson was a fellow of the Berlin Institute for Advanced Study in 2010–2011, and a Guggenheim fellow in 2020.

== Education ==
Judson is the daughter of science historian Horace Freeland Judson. She graduated from Stanford University in 1991 and gained a Doctor of Philosophy degree in biological sciences from the University of Oxford in 1995. Her doctoral advisor there was W. D. Hamilton.

== Career ==
Judson has published at least 10 articles and three commentaries in peer-reviewed scientific journals, including Nature, Science and The Lancet.

Beginning in 1995 Judson worked for two years as a science writer for The Economist and she later joined Imperial College London, where she is now an honorary research fellow. In 1997, she wrote an Economist article named "Sex Is War!" which was awarded the Glaxo Wellcome Prize by the British Science Writers Association.

Her first book, Dr Tatiana's Sex Advice to All Creation (2002), grew out of that article. Written in the style of a sex-advice column to animals, the book details the variety of sexual practices in the natural world and provides the reader with an overview of the evolutionary biology of sex. The book was praised by critics as being witty and engaging, without compromising its scientific integrity. It became an international best-seller, translated into 16 languages and was nominated for the Samuel Johnson Prize for Non-Fiction in 2003.

Judson has also worked as a television presenter. In 2004 she played Dr Tatiana in an adaptation of her book; the three-episode series titled Dr Tatiana's Sex Advice to All Creation was produced by Wag TV and EPI Productions for Channel 4 and Discovery Canada and aired in 2005. In 2007 she co-presented Animal Farm with Giles Coren; the series, which explored genetic modification and pharming, was produced by Lion Television for Channel 4.

Judson is a former online columnist for The New York Times. In January 2008, she began writing a weekly blog on evolutionary biology, titled "The Wild Side", for The New York Times website. For the first half of 2009, guest bloggers filled in for Judson while she worked on a new book project; after returning to the job for a year, she then departed for a "sabbatical" from blogging beginning June 29, 2010. In 2014, after a four-year hiatus, she did a series of eight blogs about bereavement, memory, and the emptying of a family home.

In 2009, she appeared in an episode of PBS's Nova called "What Darwin Never Knew" which discussed DNA connections to evolution.

Judson has supported a possible future campaign to completely wipe out a species of mosquito which carries dengue fever.

Judson has published articles in National Geographic magazine, on Mount Erebus in 2012, on cassowaries in 2013, on bioluminescence in 2015, and on octopuses in 2016.

In an article she published in Nature Ecology and Evolution in 2017, Judson was listed as working at Freie Universität Berlin, Imperial College London and University of Glasgow.

In 2018 Judson was appointed journalist-in-residence at the Max Planck Institute for the History of Science in Berlin. It was announced that she would be researching science in St. Petersburg in the 1880s and working on a new book, 'a history of life and Earth, aimed at a general audience'. The book, titled The Co-Creation – How Earth Made Life and Life Made Earth, is scheduled to appear in the US in December 2026.
