= Bioevent =

Geological process

A bioevent or bio-event (a shortening of 'biotic event' or 'biological event') is an event recognised in a sequence of sedimentary rocks, where there is a significant change in the biota as recorded by assemblages of fossils over a relatively short period of time. It has been defined as "short-term (hours or days to kyrs) locally, regionally, or interregionally pervasive changes in the ecological, biogeographical, and/or evolutionary character of biotas that are isochronous or nearly so throughout their range". Bioevents either relate to diversification of a particular fossil group or a reduction, these may equate to speciation events or extinction events, or may only represent migration. Records of the appearance and disappearance of particular taxa at a single locality are insufficient to define a bioevent.
