= Punctuated gradualism =

Microevolutionary hypothesis

Punctuated gradualism is a microevolutionary hypothesis that refers to a species that has "relative stasis over a considerable part of its total duration [and] underwent periodic, relatively rapid, morphologic change that did not lead to lineage branching". It is one of the three common models of evolution.

== Description ==
While the traditional model of paleontology, the phylogenetic model, posits that features evolved slowly without any direct association with speciation, the relatively newer and more controversial idea of punctuated equilibrium claims that major evolutionary changes don't happen over a gradual period but in localized, rare, rapid events of branching speciation.

Punctuated gradualism is considered to be a variation of these models, lying somewhere in between the phyletic gradualism model and the punctuated equilibrium model. It states that speciation is not needed for a lineage to rapidly evolve from one equilibrium to another but may show rapid transitions between long-stable states.

== History ==
In 1983, Malmgren and colleagues published a paper called "Evidence for punctuated gradualism in the late Neogene Globorotalia tumida lineage of planktonic foraminifera." This paper studied the lineage of planktonic foraminifera, specifically the evolutionary transition from G. plesiotumida to G. tumida across the Miocene/Pliocene boundary. The study found that the G. tumida lineage, while remaining in relative stasis over a considerable part of its total duration underwent periodic, relatively rapid, morphologic change that did not lead to lineage branching. Based on these findings, Malmgren and colleagues introduced a new mode of evolution and proposed to call it "punctuated gradualism." There is strong evidence supporting both gradual evolution of a species over time and rapid events of species evolution separated by periods of little evolutionary change. Organisms have a great propensity to adapt and evolve depending on the circumstances.

== Studies ==
Studies use evidence to predict how organisms evolved in the past and apply this evidence to the present. Both models of evolution can not only be seen between species, but also within a species. This is shown in a study done on the body size evolution in the radiolarian Pseudocubus vema. This study presents evidence of a species exhibiting punctuated and gradual evolution, while also having periods of relative stasis. Another study also used body size and looked at both micro-evolutionary patterns and fossil records. The study uses quantitative data to make conclusions and is an example of another study using body size as an indicator of evolution.

One study focuses on how efforts to apply only one mode of evolution to a phenomenon can be inaccurate. It supports how difficult it can be to show that only one mode of evolution is at play at any given time. Another study also displays the importance of considering both models. The study supports that there can always be both models at play at any time. Another related study focuses on the extent of undefined area when trying to compare the two modes of evolution making it difficult to isolate one model.

There will always be variance in environments. Some environments present challenges that require quick adaptation for survival, while others are relatively stable. In addition, organisms differ in the amount of traits upon which selection can act. These factors along with replication time can create barriers when working to prove a single mode of evolution as being accurate. A study expresses the importance of defining the clear objectives before research is done. The study directly challenges phyletic gradualism and punctuated equilibrium. It shows how many factors can come into play when comparing the two modes of evolution.

== Interactions ==
Other evidence for the inclusion of both styles of evolution is the consideration of how organisms relate and may interact. Two species that diverged from each other over time may both still possess a characteristic that only one still uses. The species that doesn't use the characteristic might begin to use it for an alternate function, causing difficulty when trying to track evolution. Fossils do not always show the evolution of function.

== Research ==
Another avenue in which evolutionary characteristics are studied is within cancer research. There are studies on many types of cancer where similarities and differences have been identified. One study compares phenotypic characteristics to genotypic characteristics. The study concludes that genomic analysis supports both models and highlights the importance of studying the genotype, phenotype, and the relationship between the two. One study looked at pancreatic cancer. Pancreatic cancer is a rapidly progressing cancer. This study examines the punctuated genomic change that results in the rapid progression of this cancer. Cancer studies are compared to analyze modes of evolution.

A similar study also looks at cancer to describe evolutionary change. This study challenges old conclusions and supports both models using more modern techniques providing current evidence for interpretation. A study looks at breast cancer. This study focuses on genome analysis that some of the previous studies expressed the importance of doing. The study highlights how dynamic the body can be during the progression of cancer. The changes can be seen in cancer cells as they can show patters of punctuation, gradualism, and relative stasis.

== See also ==
- Phyletic gradualism
- Punctuated equilibrium
