= List of books about the politics of science =

This is a list of notable books about the politics of science that have their own articles on Wikipedia.

== Environment ==
- Merchants of Doubt: How a Handful of Scientists Obscured the Truth on Issues from Tobacco Smoke to Global Warming (2010) by Naomi Oreskes and Erik M. Conway

== Health ==
- Liberation by Oppression (2002) by Thomas Szasz
- Mad in America (2002) by Robert Whitaker
- Big Pharma: How the World's Biggest Drug Companies Control Illness (2006) by Jacky Law
- Medical Apartheid (2007) by Harriet A. Washington
- Side Effects (2008) by Alison Bass
- Bad Science (2008) by Ben Goldacre
- Doubt is Their Product: How Industry's Assault on Science Threatens Your Health (2008) by David Michaels (epidemiologist)
- Anatomy of an Epidemic (2010) by Robert Whitaker
- Bad Pharma: How drug companies mislead doctors and harm patients (2012) by Ben Goldacre

== Miscellaneous ==
- Bending Science (2008)
- Betrayers of the Truth: Fraud and Deceit in the Halls of Science (1983)
- Plastic Fantastic: How the Biggest Fraud in Physics Shook the Scientific World (2009)
- Science, Money, and Politics: Political Triumph and Ethical Erosion (2001)
- Science Under Siege: The Politicians' War on Nature and Truth (1998)
- The Great Betrayal: Fraud In Science (2004)
- The New Politics of Science (1984)
- The Republican War on Science (2005)
