= Dr Tatiana's Sex Advice to All Creation =

Popular science book by Olivia Judson

- Author: Olivia Judson
- Language: English
- Subject: -
- Genre: popular science
- Publication date: 2002

Dr Tatiana's Sex Advice to All Creation: The Definitive Guide to the Evolutionary Biology of Sex is a 2002 popular science book by the British evolutionary biologist Olivia Judson written in the role of her alter ego, agony aunt Dr Tatiana. Dr Tatiana receives letters from various creatures about their sex lives, and responds by explaining the biology of sex to creatures concerned.

The book grew out of the article "Sex Is War!" she had written for the Economist in 1997. It became an international best-seller and was nominated for the Samuel Johnson Prize for Non-Fiction in 2003. It was later turned into a three-part musical of the same name, shown on Channel 4 in 2005.
