= Punctuated equilibrium =

Theory in evolutionary biology

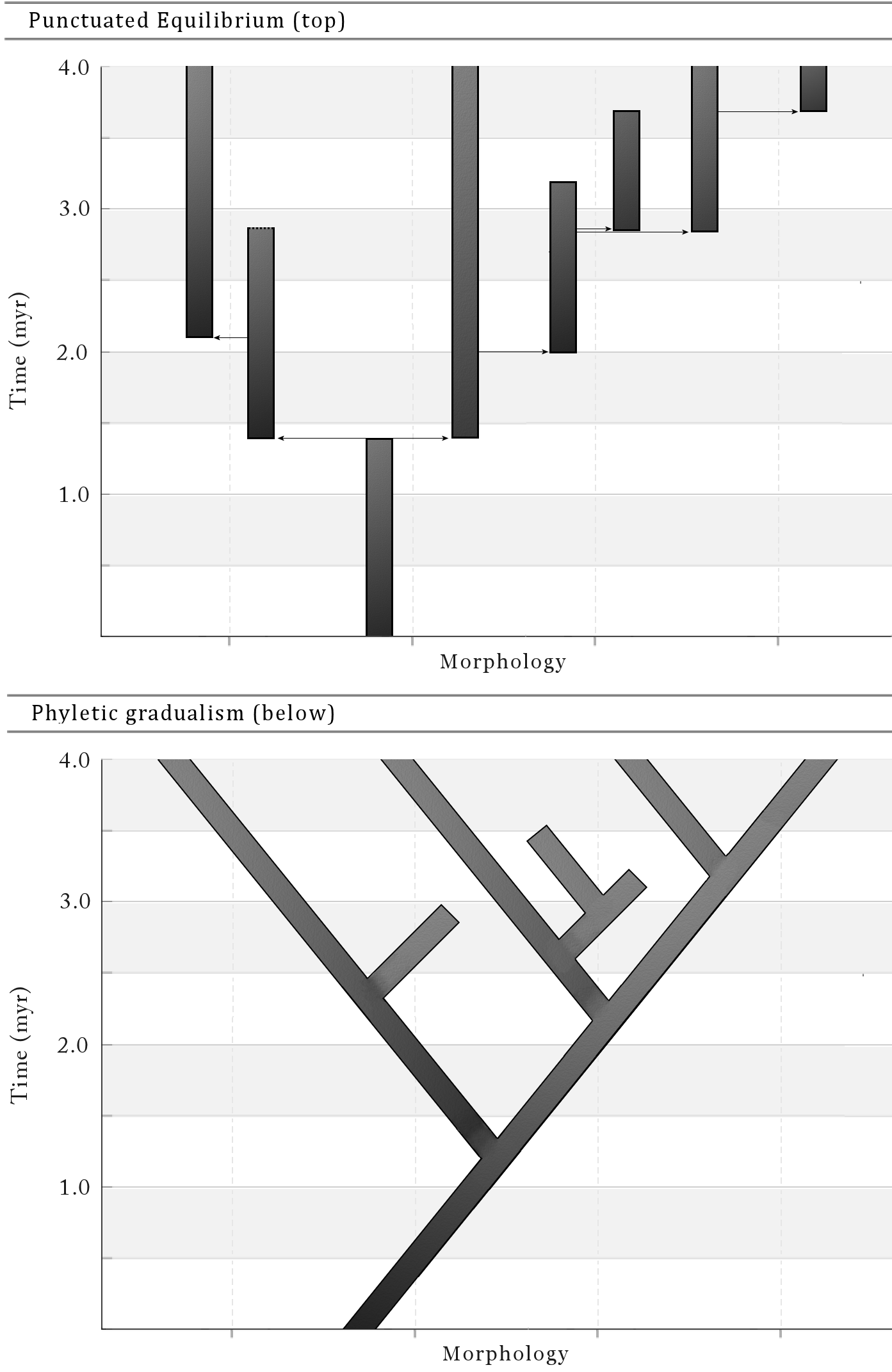
A caricature illustrating extreme versions of punctuation equilibrium and evolutionary gradualism. The punctuated equilibrium model (top) consists of morphological stability followed by rare bursts of evolutionary change via rapid cladogenesis – vertical equilibrium states separated by horizontal "jump" phases. In contrast, phyletic gradualism (below), is a more gradual, continuous model of evolution – with accumulation of small incremental changes represented by slanted bars that split at branch-points, where two separate modes of life are feasible but of which, each prospers best with divergent specializations.

In evolutionary biology, punctuated equilibrium (also called punctuated equilibria) is a theory that proposes that once a new species appears in the fossil record, the population will become stable, showing little evolutionary change for most of its geological history. This state of little or no morphological change is called stasis. When significant evolutionary change occurs, the theory proposes that it is generally restricted to rare and geologically rapid events of branching speciation called cladogenesis. Cladogenesis is the process by which a species splits into two distinct species, rather than one species gradually transforming into another.

Punctuated equilibrium is commonly contrasted with phyletic gradualism, the idea that evolution generally occurs uniformly by the steady and gradual transformation of whole lineages (anagenesis).

In 1972, paleontologists Niles Eldredge and Stephen Jay Gould published a landmark paper developing their theory and called it punctuated equilibria. Their paper built upon Ernst Mayr's model of geographic speciation, I. M. Lerner's theories of developmental and genetic homeostasis, and their own empirical research. Eldredge and Gould proposed that the degree of gradualism commonly attributed to Charles Darwin is virtually nonexistent in the fossil record, and that stasis dominates the history of most fossil species.

== History ==
Punctuated equilibrium originated as a logical consequence of Ernst Mayr's concept of genetic revolutions by allopatric and especially peripatric speciation as applied to the fossil record. Although the sudden appearance of species and its relationship to speciation was proposed and identified by Mayr in 1954, historians of science generally recognize the 1972 Eldredge and Gould paper as the basis of the new paleobiological research program. Punctuated equilibrium differs from Mayr's ideas mainly in that Eldredge and Gould placed considerably greater emphasis on stasis before and after sudden changes in form, whereas Mayr was concerned with explaining the morphological discontinuity (or "sudden jumps") found in the fossil record. Mayr later complimented Eldredge and Gould's paper, stating that evolutionary stasis had been "unexpected by most evolutionary biologists" and that punctuated equilibrium "had a major impact on paleontology and evolutionary biology."

A year before his and Gould's 1972 paper, Niles Eldredge published a paper in the journal Evolution which suggested that gradual evolution was seldom seen in the fossil record and argued that Ernst Mayr's standard mechanism of allopatric speciation might suggest a possible resolution.

The Eldredge and Gould paper was presented at the Annual Meeting of the Geological Society of America in 1971. The symposium focused its attention on how modern microevolutionary studies could revitalize various aspects of paleontology and macroevolution. Tom Schopf, who organized that year's meeting, assigned Gould the topic of speciation. Gould recalls that "Eldredge's 1971 publication [on Paleozoic trilobites] had presented the only new and interesting ideas on the paleontological implications of the subject—so I asked Schopf if we could present the paper jointly." According to Gould "the ideas came mostly from Niles, with yours truly acting as a sounding board and eventual scribe. I coined the term punctuated equilibrium and wrote most of our 1972 paper, but Niles is the proper first author in our pairing of Eldredge and Gould." In his book Time Frames Eldredge recalls that after much discussion the pair "each wrote roughly half. Some of the parts that would seem obviously the work of one of us were actually first penned by the other—I remember for example, writing the section on Gould's snails. Other parts are harder to reconstruct. Gould edited the entire manuscript for better consistency. We sent it in, and Schopf reacted strongly against it—thus signaling the tenor of the reaction it has engendered, though for shifting reasons, down to the present day."

John Wilkins and Gareth Nelson have argued that French architect Pierre Trémaux proposed an "anticipation of the theory of punctuated equilibrium of Gould and Eldredge."

== Evidence from the fossil record ==
The fossil record includes well documented examples of both phyletic gradualism and punctuational evolution. As such, much debate persists over the prominence of stasis in the fossil record. Before punctuated equilibrium, most evolutionary biologists considered stasis to be rare or unimportant. The paleontologist George Gaylord Simpson, for example, believed that phyletic gradual evolution (called horotely in his terminology) comprised 90% of evolution. More modern studies, including a meta-analysis examining 58 published studies on speciation patterns in the fossil record showed that 71% of species exhibited stasis, and 63% were associated with punctuated patterns of evolutionary change. According to Michael Benton, "it seems clear then that stasis is common, and that had not been predicted from modern genetic studies." A paramount example of evolutionary stasis is the fern Osmunda claytoniana. Based on paleontological evidence it has remained unchanged, even at the level of fossilized nuclei and chromosomes, for at least 180 million years.

== Theoretical mechanisms ==
=== Punctuational change ===
When Eldredge and Gould published their 1972 paper, allopatric speciation was considered the "standard" model of speciation. This model was popularized by Ernst Mayr in his 1954 paper "Change of genetic environment and evolution," and his classic volume Animal Species and Evolution (1963).

Allopatric speciation suggests that species with large central populations are stabilized by their large volume and the process of gene flow. New and even beneficial mutations are diluted by the population's large size and are unable to reach fixation, due to such factors as constantly changing environments. If this is the case, then the transformation of whole lineages should be rare, as the fossil record indicates. Smaller populations on the other hand, which are isolated from the parental stock, are decoupled from the homogenizing effects of gene flow. In addition, pressure from natural selection is especially intense, as peripheral isolated populations exist at the outer edges of ecological tolerance. If most evolution happens in these rare instances of allopatric speciation then evidence of gradual evolution in the fossil record should be rare. This hypothesis was alluded to by Mayr in the closing paragraph of his 1954 paper:

Rapidly evolving peripherally isolated populations may be the place of origin of many evolutionary novelties. Their isolation and comparatively small size may explain phenomena of rapid evolution and lack of documentation in the fossil record, hitherto puzzling to the palaeontologist.

Although punctuated equilibrium generally applies to sexually reproducing organisms, some biologists have applied the model to non-sexual species like viruses, which cannot be stabilized by conventional gene flow. As time went on biologists like Gould moved away from wedding punctuated equilibrium to allopatric speciation, particularly as evidence accumulated in support of other modes of speciation. Gould, for example, was particularly attracted to Douglas Futuyma's work on the importance of reproductive isolating mechanisms.

=== Stasis ===
Many hypotheses have been proposed to explain the putative causes of stasis. Gould was initially attracted to I. Michael Lerner's theories of developmental and genetic homeostasis. However this hypothesis was rejected over time, as evidence accumulated against it. Other plausible mechanisms which have been suggested include: habitat tracking, stabilizing selection, the Stenseth-Maynard Smith stability hypothesis, constraints imposed by the nature of subdivided populations, normalizing clade selection, and koinophilia.

Evidence for stasis has also been corroborated from the genetics of sibling species, species which are morphologically indistinguishable, but whose proteins have diverged sufficiently to suggest they have been separated for millions of years. Fossil evidence of reproductively isolated extant species of sympatric Olive Shells (Amalda sp.) also confirm morphological stasis in multiple lineages over three million years.

According to Gould, "stasis may emerge as the theory's most important contribution to evolutionary science." Philosopher Kim Sterelny in clarifying the meaning of stasis adds, "In claiming that species typically undergo no further evolutionary change once speciation is complete, they are not claiming that there is no change at all between one generation and the next. Lineages do change. But the change between generations does not accumulate. Instead, over time, the species wobbles about its phenotypic mean. Jonathan Weiner's The Beak of the Finch describes this very process."

=== Hierarchical evolution ===
Punctuated equilibrium has also been cited as contributing to the hypothesis that species are Darwinian individuals, and not just classes, thereby providing a stronger framework for a hierarchical theory of evolution.

== Common misconceptions ==
Much confusion has arisen over what proponents of punctuated equilibrium actually argued, what mechanisms they advocated, how fast the punctuations were, what taxonomic scale their theory applied to, how revolutionary their claims were intended to be, and how punctuated equilibrium related to other ideas like saltationism, quantum evolution, and mass extinction.

=== Saltationism ===
Alternative explanations for the punctuated pattern of evolution observed in the fossil record. Both macromutation and seemingly "rapid" episodes of gradual evolution could give the appearance of instantaneous change, since 10,000 years seldom registers in the geological record.

The punctuational nature of punctuated equilibrium has engendered perhaps the most confusion over Eldredge and Gould's theory. Gould's sympathetic treatment of Richard Goldschmidt, the controversial geneticist who advocated the idea of "hopeful monsters," led some biologists to conclude that Gould's punctuations were occurring in single-generation jumps. This interpretation has frequently been used by creationists to characterize the weakness of the paleontological record, and to portray contemporary evolutionary biology as advancing neo-saltationism.

In an often quoted remark, Gould stated,

"Since we proposed punctuated equilibria to explain trends, it is infuriating to be quoted again and again by creationists – whether through design or stupidity, I do not know – as admitting that the fossil record includes no transitional forms. Transitional forms are generally lacking at the species level, but they are abundant between larger groups."

Although there exist some debate over how long the punctuations last, supporters of punctuated equilibrium generally place the figure between 50,000 and 100,000 years.

=== George Gaylord Simpson ===
A similar view of variable evolutionary rates was proposed by George Gaylord Simpson in the 1950s. Simpson was regarded by Gould as "the greatest and most biologically astute paleontologist of the twentieth century." His multi-tempo theory of evolution proposed that evolutionary rates differ from group to group and even among closely related lineages. These different rates of evolutionary change were designated by Simpson as bradytelic (slow tempo), horotelic (medium tempo), and tachytelic (rapid tempo), similar to the patterns proposed by punctuated equilibrium.

One component of Simpson's view of multi-tempo evolution was the controversial quantum evolution. Simpson's conjecture was that according to the geological record, on occasion evolution would proceed very rapidly to form entirely new families, orders, and classes of organisms. Quantum evolution (but not Simpson's more general multi-tempo evolution) differs from punctuated equilibrium in several respects. First, punctuated equilibrium and Simpson's multi-tempo evolution were more modest in scope, in that they addressed evolution specifically at the species level. quantum evolution was principally concerned with evolution at higher taxonomic groups. Second, Eldredge and Gould relied upon a different mechanism. Where Simpson's quantum evolution relied upon a synergistic interaction between genetic drift and a shift in the adaptive fitness landscape, Eldredge and Gould relied upon ordinary speciation, particularly Ernst Mayr's concept of allopatric speciation. Lastly, and perhaps most significantly, quantum evolution took no position on the issue of stasis. Although Simpson acknowledged the existence of stasis in what he called the bradytelic mode, he considered it (along with rapid evolution) to be unimportant in the larger scope of evolution.

In his Major Features of Evolution Simpson stated, "Evolutionary change is so nearly the universal rule that a state of motion is, figuratively, normal in evolving populations. The state of rest, as in bradytely, is the exception and it seems that some restraint or force must be required to maintain it." Despite such differences between the two models, critiques from such eminent commentators as Sewall Wright as well as Simpson himself have argued that punctuated equilibrium is little more than multi-tempo evolution relabeled.

=== Multiple meanings of gradualism ===
Punctuated equilibrium is often portrayed to oppose the concept of gradualism, when it is actually a form of gradualism. This is because even though evolutionary change appears instantaneous between geological sedimentary layers, change is still occurring incrementally, with no great change from one generation to the next. To this end, Gould later commented that "Most of our paleontological colleagues missed this insight because they had not studied evolutionary theory and either did not know about allopatric speciation or had not considered its translation to geological time. Our evolutionary colleagues also failed to grasp the implication(s), primarily because they did not think at geological scales".

Richard Dawkins dedicates a chapter in The Blind Watchmaker to correcting, in his view, the wide confusion regarding rates of change. His first point is to argue that phyletic gradualism—understood in the sense that evolution proceeds at a single uniform speed, called "constant speedism" by Dawkins—is a "caricature of Darwinism" and "does not really exist". His second argument, which follows from the first, is that once the caricature of "constant speedism" is dismissed, we are left with one logical alternative, which Dawkins terms "variable speedism". Variable speedism may also be distinguished one of two ways: "discrete variable speedism" and "continuously variable speedism". Eldredge and Gould, proposing that evolution jumps between stability and relative rapidity, are described as "discrete variable speedists", and "in this respect they are genuinely radical." They assert that evolution generally proceeds in bursts, or not at all. "Continuously variable speedists", on the other hand, advance that "evolutionary rates fluctuate continuously from very fast to very slow and stop, with all intermediates. They see no particular reason to emphasize certain speeds more than others. In particular, stasis, to them, is just an extreme case of ultra-slow evolution. To a punctuationist, there is something very special about stasis."

== Criticism ==
Richard Dawkins regards the apparent gaps represented in the fossil record as documenting migratory events rather than evolutionary events. According to Dawkins, evolution certainly occurred but "probably gradually" elsewhere. However, the punctuational equilibrium model may still be inferred from both the observation of stasis and examples of rapid and episodic speciation events documented in the fossil record.

Dawkins also emphasizes that punctuated equilibrium has been "oversold by some journalists", but partly due to Eldredge and Gould's "later writings". Dawkins contends that the hypothesis "does not deserve a particularly large measure of publicity". It is a "minor gloss," an "interesting but minor wrinkle on the surface of neo-Darwinian theory," and "lies firmly within the neo-Darwinian synthesis".

In his book Darwin's Dangerous Idea, philosopher Daniel Dennett is especially critical of Gould's presentation of punctuated equilibrium. Dennett argues that Gould alternated between revolutionary and conservative claims, and that each time Gould made a revolutionary statement—or appeared to do so—he was criticized, and thus retreated to a traditional neo-Darwinian position. Gould responded to Dennett's claims in The New York Review of Books, and in his technical volume The Structure of Evolutionary Theory.

English professor Heidi Scott argues that Gould's talent for writing vivid prose, his use of metaphor, and his success in building a popular audience of nonspecialist readers altered the "climate of specialized scientific discourse" favorably in his promotion of punctuated equilibrium. While Gould is celebrated for the color and energy of his prose, as well as his interdisciplinary knowledge, critics such as Scott, Richard Dawkins, and Daniel Dennett have concerns that the theory has gained undeserved credence among non-scientists because of Gould's rhetorical skills. Philosopher John Lyne and biologist Henry Howe believed punctuated equilibrium's success has much more to do with the nature of the geological record than the nature of Gould's rhetoric. They state, a "re-analysis of existing fossil data has shown, to the increasing satisfaction of the paleontological community, that Eldredge and Gould were correct in identifying periods of evolutionary stasis which are interrupted by much shorter periods of evolutionary change."

Evolutionary biologist Robert Trivers accused Gould of being "something of an intellectual fraud" for using claims that were "well known from the time of Darwin" (that evolution displayed "periods of long stasis interspersed with periods of rapid change") to support distinct but more "grandiose" claims regarding species selection, despite the "rate of species turnover [having] nothing to do with the traits within species—only with the relative frequency of species showing these traits".

According to Bernard Davis, Gould's theory was inspired by the dialectics of Marx and Hegel. Davis wrote, "To most scientists (other than those tethered to a party line) such a claim of support from (or for) Hegel is silly, and such an insertion of an ideological preference, whether from the left or the right, is a corruption of science."

Some critics jokingly referred to the theory of punctuated equilibrium as "evolution by jerks", which reportedly prompted punctuationists to describe phyletic gradualism as "evolution by creeps."

== Darwin's theory ==
The sudden appearance of most species in the geologic record and the lack of evidence of substantial gradual change in most species—from their initial appearance until their extinction—has long been noted, including by Charles Darwin, who appealed to the imperfection of the record as the favored explanation. When presenting his ideas against the prevailing influences of catastrophism and progressive creationism, which envisaged species being supernaturally created at intervals, Darwin needed to forcefully stress the gradual nature of evolution in accordance with the gradualism promoted by his friend Charles Lyell. He privately expressed concern, noting in the margin of his 1844 Essay, "Better begin with this: If species really, after catastrophes, created in showers world over, my theory false."

It is often incorrectly assumed that he insisted that the rate of change must be constant, or nearly so, but even the first edition of On the Origin of Species states that "Species of different genera and classes have not changed at the same rate, or in the same degree. In the oldest tertiary beds a few living shells may still be found in the midst of a multitude of extinct forms... The Silurian Lingula differs but little from the living species of this genus". Lingula is among the few brachiopods surviving today but also known from fossils over 500 million years old. In the fourth edition (1866) of On the Origin of Species Darwin wrote that "the periods during which species have undergone modification, though long as measured in years, have probably been short in comparison with the periods during which they retain the same form." Thus punctuationism in general is consistent with Darwin's conception of evolution.

According to early versions of punctuated equilibrium, "peripheral isolates" are considered to be of critical importance for speciation. However, Darwin wrote, "I can by no means agree ... that immigration and isolation are necessary elements. ... Although isolation is of great importance in the production of new species, on the whole I am inclined to believe that largeness of area is still more important, especially for the production of species which shall prove capable of enduring for a long period, and of spreading widely."

The importance of isolation in forming species had played a significant part in Darwin's early thinking, as shown in his Essay of 1844. But by the time he wrote the Origin he had downplayed its importance. He explained the reasons for his revised view as follows:

Throughout a great and open area, not only will there be a greater chance of favourable variations, arising from the large number of individuals of the same species there supported, but the conditions of life are much more complex from the large number of already existing species; and if some of these species become modified and improved, others will have to be improved in a corresponding degree, or they will be exterminated. Each new form, also, as soon as it has been improved, will be able to spread over the open and continuous area, and will thus come into competition with many other forms ... the new forms produced on large areas, which have already been victorious over many competitors, will be those that will spread most widely, and will give rise to the greatest number of new varieties and species. They will thus play a more important role in the changing history of the organic world.

Thus punctuated equilibrium is incongruous with some of Darwin's ideas regarding the specific mechanisms of evolution, but generally accords with Darwin's theory of evolution by natural selection.

== Supplemental modes of rapid evolution ==
Recent work in developmental biology has identified dynamical and physical mechanisms of tissue morphogenesis that may underlie abrupt morphological transitions during evolution. Consequently, consideration of mechanisms of phylogenetic change that have been found in reality to be non-gradual is increasingly common in the field of evolutionary developmental biology, particularly in studies of the origin of morphological novelty. A description of such mechanisms can be found in the multi-authored volume Origination of Organismal Form (MIT Press; 2003).

== Language change ==
In linguistics, R. M. W. Dixon has proposed a punctuated equilibrium model for language histories, with reference particularly to the prehistory of the indigenous languages of Australia and his objections to the proposed Pama–Nyungan language family there. Although his model has raised considerable interest, it does not command majority support within linguistics.

Separately, recent work using computational phylogenetic methods claims to show that punctuational bursts play an important factor when languages split from one another, accounting for anywhere from 10 to 33% of the total divergence in vocabulary, and around 24% of divergence among cognates in the Indo-European language family.

== Mythology ==
Punctuational evolution has been argued to explain changes in folktales and mythology over time.

== See also ==
- Speciation
- Adaptive radiation
- Catastrophe theory
- Convergent evolution
- Court Jester Hypothesis
- Critical juncture theory
- Evolutionary capacitance
- Gene orders
- Koinophilia
- Punctuated equilibrium in social theory
- Punctuated gradualism
