= Acquired characteristic =

Non-heritable change in a function or structure of a living organism

An acquired characteristic is a non-heritable change in a function or structure of a living organism caused after birth by disease, injury, accident, deliberate modification, variation, repeated use, disuse, misuse, or other environmental influence. Acquired traits are synonymous with acquired characteristics. They are not passed on to offspring through reproduction.

The changes that constitute acquired characteristics can have many manifestations and degrees of visibility, but they all have one thing in common. They change a facet of a living organism's function or structure after birth.

For example:

- The muscles acquired by a bodybuilder through physical training and diet.
- The loss of a limb due to an injury.
- The miniaturization of bonsai plants through cultivation techniques.

Acquired characteristics can be minor and temporary like bruises, blisters, or shaving body hair. Permanent but inconspicuous or invisible ones are corrective eye surgery and organ transplant or removal. Semi-permanent but inconspicuous or invisible traits are vaccination and laser hair removal. Perms, tattoos, scars, and amputations are semi-permanent and highly visible.

Applying makeup, nail polish, dying one's hair, applying henna to the skin, and tooth whitening are not examples of acquired traits. They change the appearance of a facet of an organism, but do not change the structure or functionality.

Inheritance of acquired characteristics was historically proposed by renowned theorists such as Hippocrates, Aristotle, and French naturalist Jean-Baptiste Lamarck. Conversely, this hypothesis was denounced by other renowned theorists such as Charles Darwin. Today, although Lamarckism is generally discredited, there is still debate on whether some acquired characteristics in organisms are actually inheritable.

== Disputes ==
Acquired characteristics, by definition, are characteristics that are gained by an organism after birth as a result of external influences or the organism's own activities which change its structure or function and cannot be inherited. Inherited characteristics, by definition, are characteristics that are gained or to which an organism is predisposed as a result of genetic transmission from its parents and can be passed to the organism's offspring. Therefore, every condition an organism does not gain or develop because of inheritance of its parents' genetic information must be considered an acquired characteristic.

=== Eye color ===
It is fairly common for mammalian eyes to change color in the first years of life. This happens, with human infants and kittens being some well-known examples, because the eyes of the baby, just like the rest of its body, are still developing. This change can be as simple as blue to brown, or can involve multiple color changes in which neither the child's parents nor his/her doctors know when the changes will stop and what the final eye color will be.

Changes in eye color signal changes in the arrangement and concentration of pigment in the iris, which is an example of structural color. Even though this change happens after birth, it is strictly as result of genes. While changes in eye appearance (and function, and structure) that occur because of acquired characteristics like injury, illness, old age, or malnutrition are definitely acquired characteristics, the infantile color change as described above is usually considered inherited.

=== De novo mutations ===
New mutations, (often somatic, spontaneous and sporadic), not inherited from either parent are called de novo mutations. The consensus on whether certain prenatal spontaneous mutations and genetic disorders that occur as a result of meiotic and chromosome errors or during cell division after conception, like cystic fibrosis and Down syndrome, are considered to be acquired or inherited is unclear. Mutations and meiotic errors can be considered inherited since the organism is born with them in its genes, but they can also be seen as prenatal acquired characteristics since they are not actually inherited from its parents. With de novo mutations and division errors, the relationship between the offspring's altered genes and gene inheritance from the parents is technically spurious. These genetic errors can affect the mind as well as the body and can result in schizophrenia, autism, bi-polar disorder, and cognitive disabilities.

=== Prenatal conditions ===
The definitions of inherited and acquired characteristics leave a gray area for trauma, pre-existing and gestational maternal conditions that affect the fetus, as well as chemical and pathogen exposures and trauma that happen before and while an organism is born, such as AIDS, syphilis, Hepatitis B, chickenpox, rubella, unregulated gestational diabetes, and fetal alcohol syndrome. Most infections won't affect a fetus if the pregnant mother contracts it, but some can be transmitted to babies via the placenta or during birth, and others cause more severe symptoms in pregnant women or can cause complications to the pregnancy.

== Types ==
The World Health Organization defines health as "a state of complete physical, mental and social well-being, and not merely the absence of disease or infirmity." Acquired characteristics do not necessarily affect the health of an organism, (a scar, suntan, or perm) but examples that do are often the first that come to mind when thinking of acquired characteristics since they are the easiest to observe and the ones that we, ourselves, are most familiar with.

=== Physical ===
Physical acquired characteristics can stem from various environmental influences such as disease, modification, injury, and regular or infrequent use of body parts.

=== Mental ===
Mental traits are acquired by learning and adapting native traits to the environment of the individual.

Sentiments are the result of the compounding of primary emotions, being "bound up with knowledge and ideas." Only through vast experience in the natural world can humans learn to recognize objects in all of the various orientations in which we encounter them on a day-to-day basis. The ability to do something well is an acquired characteristic, since a skill comes from one's knowledge, practice, aptitude, etc.

== Period of origin ==
There are mainly four types of disease:

- pathogenic disease
- deficiency disease
- hereditary disease
- physiological disease

=== Prenatal ===
Congenital disorders, or birth defects, are conditions present at birth. They may be structural or functional, and can result from genetic or chromosomal disorders or from environmental factors during pregnancy. Environmental factors may include exposure to chemicals, infections, or physical trauma.

==== Chemical exposure ====
Hormones are chemicals released by a cell or a gland in one part of the body that affect cells in other parts of the organism.

Chemicals are substances with distinct molecular compositions that are produced by or used in a chemical process. While all types of asbestos fibers are known to cause serious health hazards in humans,

==== Maternal conditions during gestation ====
Worth noting is the importance of prenatal nutrition to proper mental and physical development. A correlation between fraternal birth order and male sexual orientation has been suggested to be responsible for up to 15 percent of homosexuality. It is hypothesized to have something to do with changes induced in the mother's body when gestating a boy that affects subsequent sons, possibly an in-utero maternal immune response.

There is also reason to believe that the immune system of a baby will be healthier if, during pregnancy, the mother's immune system was regularly stimulated by exposure to pathogens.

"...A mother's farm exposure affects her baby's T regulatory cells. These cells, it is now believed, act to suppress immune responses and thereby maintain immune system homeostasis to contribute to healthy immune development. ... The babies of mothers exposed to farms have more and better functioning regulatory T cells."

—

=== Childhood ===
It is posited that the absence of exposure to parasites, bacteria, and viruses is playing a significant role in the development of autoimmune diseases in the more sanitized Western industrialized nations. Lack of exposure to naturally occurring pathogens may result in an increased incidence of autoimmune diseases. (See hygiene hypothesis.)

A complete explanation of how environmental factors play a role in autoimmune diseases has still not been proposed. However epidemiological studies, such as the meta analysis by Leonardi-Bee, et al., have helped to establish the link between parasitic infestation and autoimmune disease development, in other words, exposure to parasites reduces incidence of an autoimmune disease developing.

"Early life exposure to microbes (i.e., germs) is an important determinant of adulthood sensitivity to allergic and autoimmune diseases such as hay fever, asthma and inflammatory bowel disease."

"Immunological diseases, such as eczema and asthma, are on the increase in westernized society and represent a major challenge for 21st century medicine. ...[G]rowing up on a farm directly affects the regulation of the immune system and causes a reduction in the immunological responses to food proteins," which not only means less severe reactions to food allergies, lactose intolerance, gluten sensitivity, etc., but reductions in the likelihood of developing them in the first place.

== Causes ==
=== Disease ===
Disease is any condition that impairs the normal physical or mental (or both) function of an organism. (Though this definition includes injuries, it will not be discussed here). Diseases can arise from infection, environmental conditions, accidents, and inherited diseases.

It is not always easy to classify the source of a health problem. For instance, people can develop gout, which is known to cause permanent or near permanent changes to the human body, because of diet, inherited genetic predisposition, as a secondary condition from other diseases, or as an unintended side effect of certain medications.

Infectious diseases can be caused by pathogens and microorganisms such as viruses, prions, bacteria, parasites, and fungi.

For infectious, environmental, and genetically predisposed conditions, lifestyle choices such as exercise, nutrition, stress level, hygiene, home and work environments, use or abuse of legal and illegal drugs, and access to healthcare (including an individual's financial ability and personal willingness to seek medical attention) especially in the early stages of an illness all combine to determine a person's risk factors for developing a disease or condition.

Precancerous condition Progressive disease localized disease to spread to other area of the body.

=== Diet ===
The World Food Program and UNICEF reported last year that chronic malnutrition had left 42 percent of North Korean children stunted — meaning their growth was seriously impaired, most likely permanently. An earlier report by the U.N. agencies warned that there was strong evidence that physical stunting could be accompanied by intellectual impairment.

— Demick, Barbara. 2-14-2004. The Seattle Times.

"North Koreans are on average three inches shorter than their cousins in the South."

This statistic, or versions of it, have been quoted for some time. In 2010, the late Christopher Hitchens put the difference at six inches in an article in Slate, titled "A Nation of Racist Dwarfs". Martin Bloem is head of nutrition at the World Food Programme, which has been providing food aid to North Korea since 1995. He says poor diet in the early years of life leads to stunted growth. "Food and what happens in the first two years of life is actually critical for people's height later," he says.

Today, according to the World Food Programme, "one in every three children [in North Korea] remains chronically malnourished or 'stunted', meaning they are too short for their age".

— Knight, Richard. 4-22-2012. BBC News

=== Injury ===
Trauma is "a body wound or shock produced by sudden physical injury, as from violence or accident," or, more simply put, is "a physical wound or injury, such as a fracture or blow."

Accidental injuries, most of which can be predicted and thus prevented, are the unintentional negative outcomes of unforeseen or unplanned events or circumstances which may have been avoided or prevented if reasonable measures had been taken or if the risks involving the circumstances leading up to the accident been recognized and acted upon (minimized).

Battery is a criminal offense involving the use of force against another that results in harmful or offensive contact. (Assault is fear/belief of impending battery.) Violence is defined by the WHO as the intentional use of physical force or power, threatened or actual, against oneself or others that either results in or has a high likelihood of resulting in injury, death, psychological harm, maldevelopment or deprivation.

==== Head trauma ====
Head trauma in the form of a traumatic brain injury, stroke, drug or alcohol abuse, and infection have been known in some cases to cause changes to a person's mental processes, the most common being amnesia, ability to deal with stress and changes in aggression. There have also been documented cases of a person's personality changing more drastically, the best-known case being Phineas Gage, who in 1848 who survived a 1.1 meter long tamping iron being driven through his skull (though almost all presentations of Gage's subsequent personality changes are grossly exaggerated).

There is also the rare condition called Foreign Accent Syndrome that occurs after a brain injury. The injured person will appear to speak in a new language or dialect. This is typically thought to be due to an injury to the linguistic center of the brain causing speech impairment that just happens to sound like a person's non-native language. This is thought to be the reasoning behind the urban legend where someone wakes from a coma or surgery and suddenly speaks a new language.

==== Body modification ====
Body modification is the deliberate altering of the human body for any non-medical reason, such as aesthetics, sexual enhancement, a rite of passage, religious reasons, to display group membership or affiliation, to create body art, shock value, or self-expression.

== See also ==
- Lamarck's inheritance of acquired characteristics
- Adaptation
- Jean-Baptiste Lamarck
- August Weismann's Experiments on the inheritance of acquired characteristics
- Nature versus nurture
- Behavioural genetics
- Epigenetics
- Body modification
- Heredity
- Genetic disorder
- Mutation
- Genetic predisposition
- Risk factors
- Maternal effect
- Environmental disease
- Environmental factor
- Hygiene hypothesis
- Contamination
- Disease
- Injury
- Healing
