= Environmental health =

Public health branch focused on environmental impacts on human health

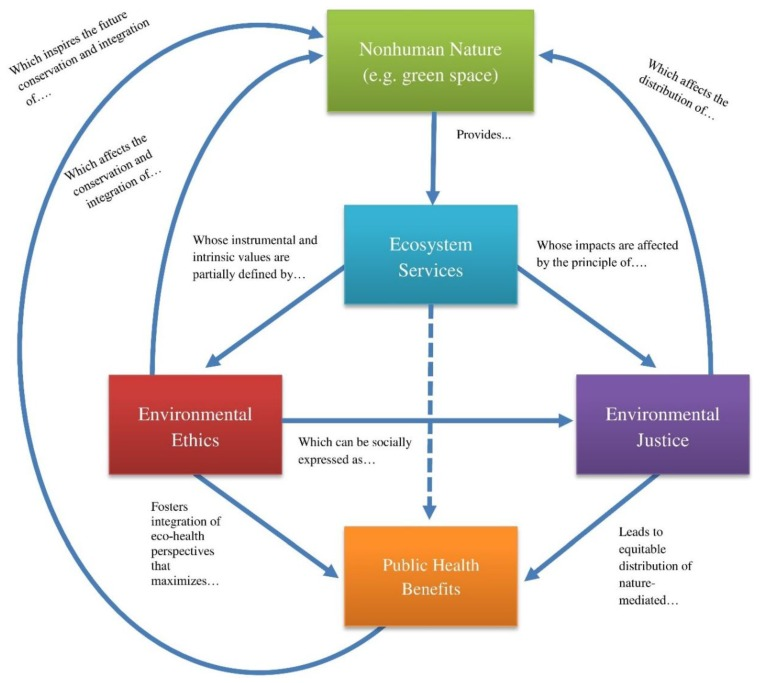
Conceptual map illustrating the connections among nonhuman nature, ecosystem services, environmental ethics, environmental justice, and public health

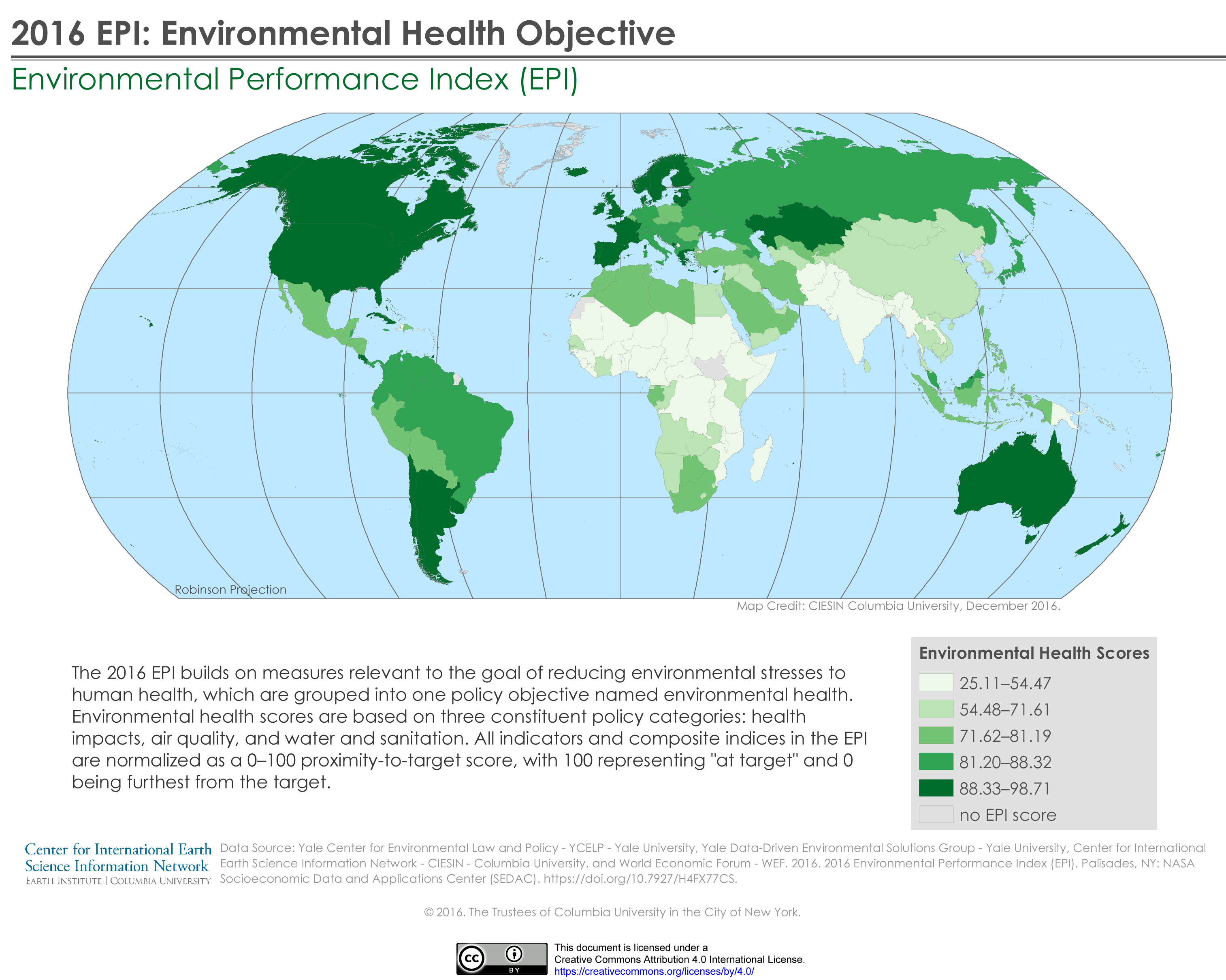
Environmental health indicator (2016). It consists of three categories: health impacts, air quality, and water and sanitation. The health impacts category includes the environmental risk exposure indicator.

Environmental health is the branch of public health concerned with all aspects of the natural and built environment affecting human health. Its study determines the requirements for a healthy environment, with the goal of effective control over the factors that affect health. The major sub-disciplines of environmental health are environmental science, toxicology, environmental epidemiology, and environmental and occupational medicine.

== Definitions ==
=== WHO definitions ===
Environmental health was defined in a 1989 document by the World Health Organization (WHO) as: Those aspects of human health and disease that are determined by factors in the environment. It is also referred to as the theory and practice of assessing and controlling factors in the environment that can potentially affect health.

As of 2016, the WHO website on environmental health states that "Environmental health addresses all the physical, chemical, and biological factors external to a person, and all the related factors impacting behaviours. It encompasses the assessment and control of those environmental factors that can potentially affect health. It is targeted towards preventing disease and creating health-supportive environments. This definition excludes behaviour not related to the environment, as well as behaviour related to the social and cultural environment, as well as genetics."

Environmental health also looks at how exposure to things like air pollution, water contamination, and chemicals can affect people's health over time.

=== Other considerations ===
The term environmental medicine may be seen as a medical specialty, or a branch of the broader field of environmental health. Terminology is not fully established, and in many European countries these are used interchangeably.

Other terms referring to or concerning environmental health include environmental public health and health protection.

Comparison of integrated approach in health
	Origins	Concept
Environmental health	From the 1880s Sanitary Science	Anthropocentric approach on environment influence on human health.
One Health (legacy)	Virchow and Osler (1800s) and Schwabe (1964) zoonosis	Collaboration of human medicine and veterinary.
One Medicine–One Health (modern)	Early 2000s as response to emerging infectious diseases (SARS, MERS, Ebola)	Cross-sectoral and transdisciplinary collaboration to improve health of humans, animals and ecosystems because of inter-connectedness.; Recognizes the interconnectedness of human, animal, and environmental health.; Incorporates components of food safety, antimicrobial resistance, and environmental contaminations.
Conservation medicine	1990s as health gains importance in conservation	Connection of health of animals and humans and ecosystems in situ
Comparative medicine	Since ancient time	Understanding shared or similar pathophysiological processes, which is fundamentals for medical and translational research
Ecohealth	1990s by French Canadian-based International Development Research Centre	Dependency of human and animal health and wellbeing on sustained environment.; Human and ecosystem health exists in socio-ecological interactions
Planetary health	Introduced in 1970–80s, and repopularized by Lancet Commission and Rockefeller Foundation	Anthropomorphized view of impact and interconnectedness of humans with the Earth at all levels
One Welfare	Emerged in 2015 for promotion of the links between animal welfare and human wellbeing	Highlights the interconnection of animal welfare, human wellbeing, and environment to foster interdisciplinary collaboration in order to improve human and animal welfare
Beyond One Ocean Health (B1OH)	Impacts of environmental change on health of ecosystems and organisms with emphasis on ocean	Highlights transdisciplinary actions on aquatic ecosystems, interconnected integrated systems and health through sustainable developments; Links healthy ocean with health and equity.
Public health		Population-based (instead of individual); Focus on health promotion and prevention (instead of treatment and rehabilitation); Social, cultural, economic, political, and environmental determinant of health
Global health	Supraterritoriality of health	Transboundary health threats

== Disciplines ==
Five basic disciplines generally contribute to the field of environmental health, with some overlap between them:

- Environmental epidemiology studies the relationship between environmental exposures (including exposure to chemicals, radiation, microbiological agents, etc.) and human health. Observational studies, which simply observe exposures that people have already experienced, are common in environmental epidemiology because humans cannot ethically be exposed to agents that are known or suspected to cause disease. While the inability to use experimental study designs is a limitation of environmental epidemiology, this discipline directly observes effects on human health rather than estimating effects from animal studies. Environmental epidemiology is the study of the effect on human health of physical, biologic, and chemical factors in the external environment, broadly conceived. Also, examining specific populations or communities exposed to different ambient environments, Epidemiology in our environment aims to clarify the relationship that exist between physical, biologic or chemical factors and human health.
- Toxicology studies how environmental exposures lead to specific health outcomes, generally in animals, as a means to understand possible health outcomes in humans. Toxicology has the advantage of being able to conduct randomized controlled trials and other experimental studies because it can use animal subjects. However, there are many differences in animal and human biology, and there can be a lot of uncertainty when interpreting the results of animal studies for their implications for human health.
- Exposure science studies human exposure to environmental contaminants by both identifying and quantifying exposures. Exposure science can be used to support environmental epidemiology by better describing environmental exposures that may lead to a particular health outcome, identify common exposures whose health outcomes may be better understood through a toxicology study, or can be used in a risk assessment to determine whether current levels of exposure might exceed recommended levels. Exposure science has the advantage of being able to very accurately quantify exposures to specific chemicals, but it does not generate any information about health outcomes like environmental epidemiology or toxicology.
- Environmental engineering applies scientific and engineering principles for protection of human populations from the effects of adverse environmental factors; protection of environments from potentially deleterious effects of natural and human activities; and general improvement of environmental quality.
- Environmental law includes the network of treaties, statutes, regulations, common and customary laws addressing the effects of human activity on the natural environment.

Information from epidemiology, toxicology, and exposure science can be combined to conduct a risk assessment for specific chemicals, mixtures of chemicals or other risk factors to determine whether an exposure poses significant risk to human health (exposure would likely result in the development of pollution-related diseases). This can in turn be used to develop and implement environmental health policy that, for example, regulates chemical emissions, or imposes standards for proper sanitation. Intervention strategies from engineering and law can be combined to provide monitoring and risk management of exposure, and achieve the objective of protecting human health.

=== Pediatric environmental health ===
Children's environmental health is the academic discipline that studies how environmental exposures in early life—chemical, biological, nutritional, and social—influence health and development in childhood and across the entire human life span. Pediatric environmental health is based on the recognition that children are not "little adults." Infants and children have unique patterns of exposure and vulnerabilities. Environmental risks of infants and children are qualitatively and quantitatively different from those of adults. Pediatric environmental health is highly interdisciplinary. It spans and brings together general pediatrics and numerous pediatric subspecialties as well as epidemiology, occupational and environmental medicine, medical toxicology, industrial hygiene, and exposure science.

== Concerns ==
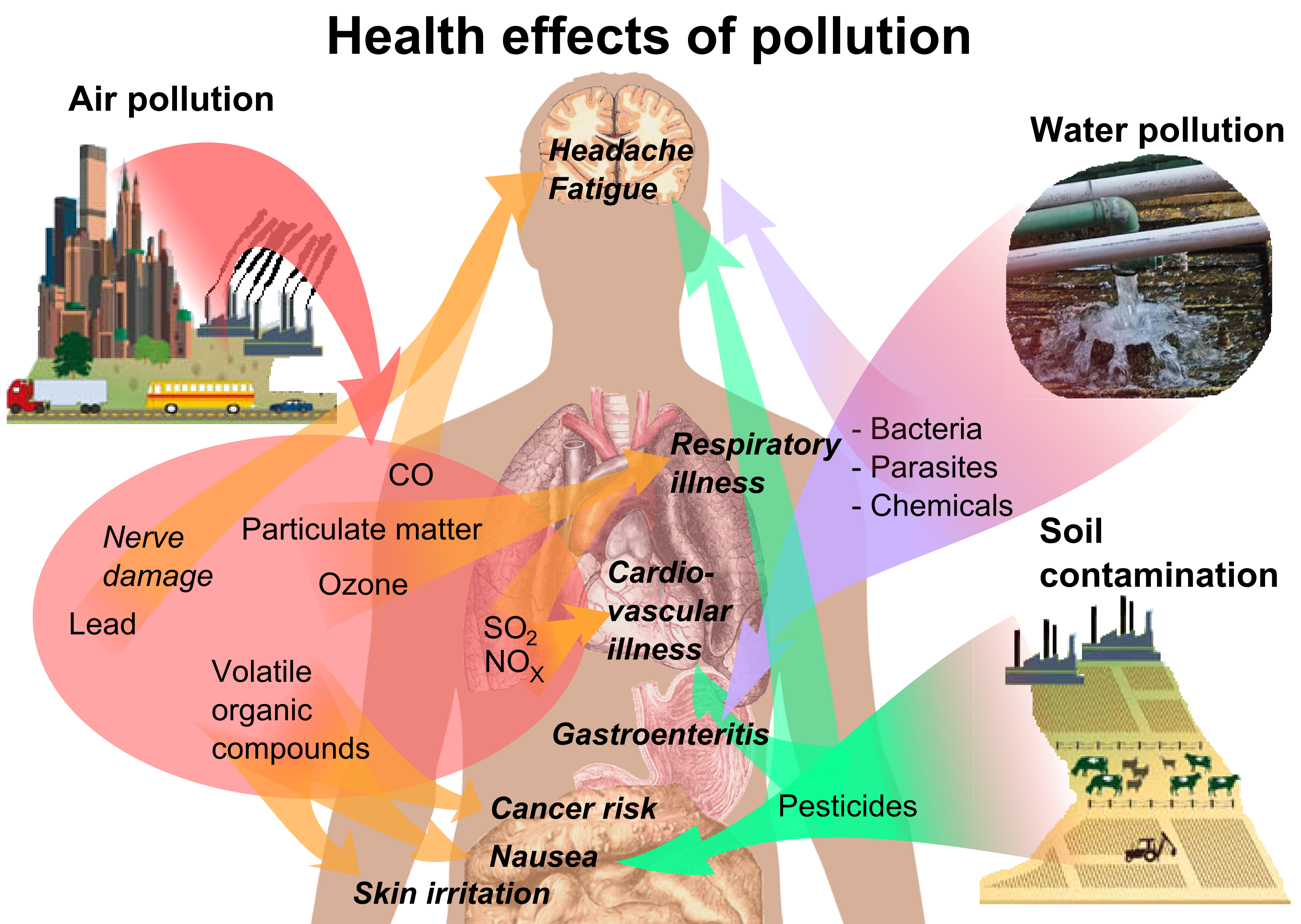
Overview of main health effects on humans from some common types of pollution

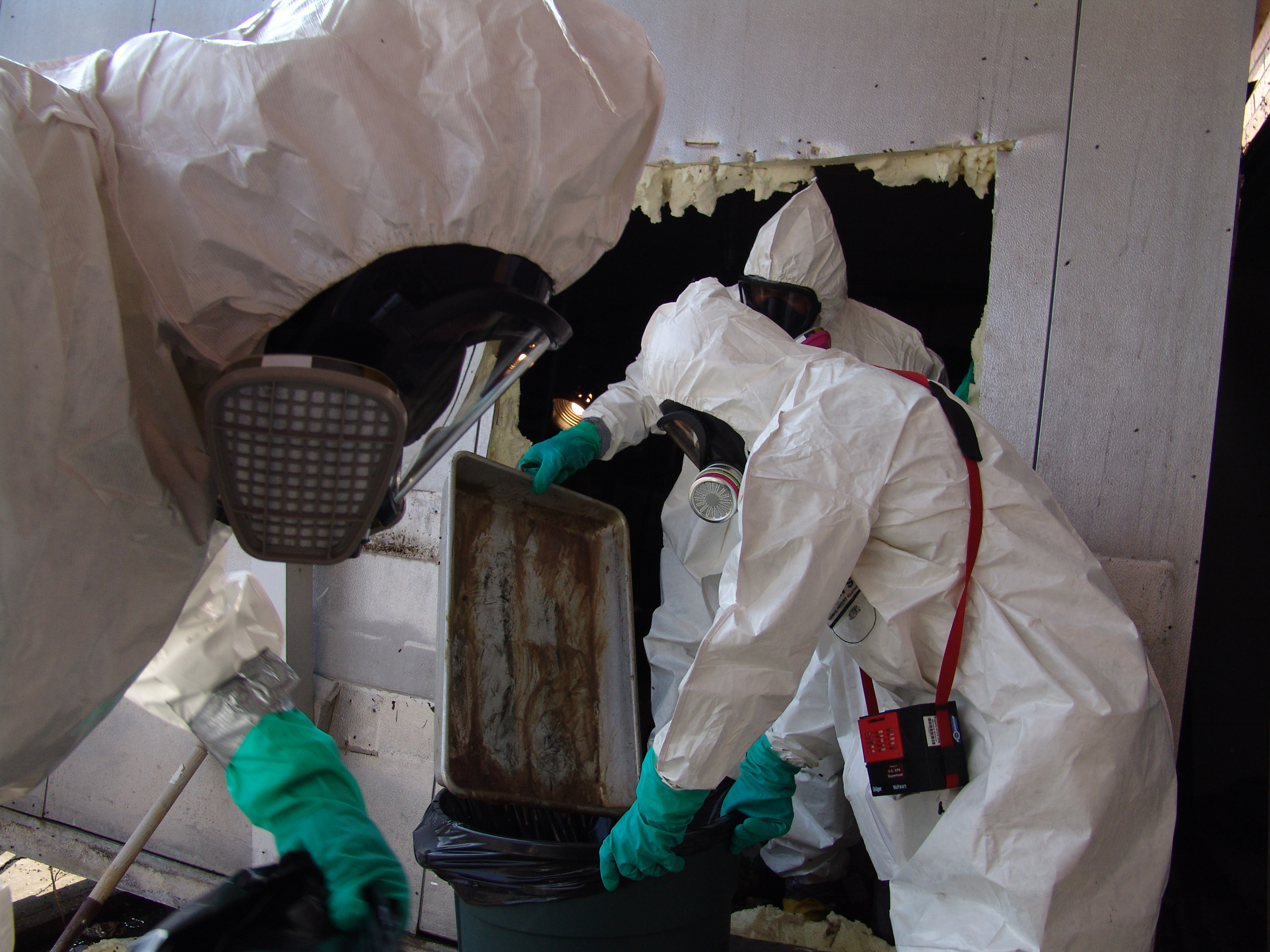
FEMA/EPA Hazardous Materials Team removing hazards left in the wake of Hurricane Katrina, 2005

Lecture of Joyeeta Gupta (University of Amsterdam) on environmental health

Environmental health concerns include:

- Biosafety.
- Disaster preparedness and response.
- Food safety, including in agriculture, transportation, food processing, wholesale and retail distribution and sale.
- Housing, including substandard housing abatement and the inspection of jails and prisons.
- Childhood lead poisoning prevention.
- Land use planning, including smart growth.
- Liquid waste disposal, including city waste water treatment plants and on-site waste water disposal systems, such as septic tank systems and chemical toilets.
- Medical waste management and disposal.
- Occupational health and industrial hygiene.
- Radiological health, including exposure to ionizing radiation from X-rays or radioactive isotopes.
- Recreational water illness prevention, including from swimming pools, spas and ocean and freshwater bathing places.
- Solid waste management, including landfills, recycling facilities, composting and solid waste transfer stations.
- Toxic chemical exposure whether in consumer products, housing, workplaces, air, water or soil.
- Toxins from molds and algal blooms.
- Vector control, including the control of mosquitoes, rodents, flies, cockroaches and other animals that may transmit pathogens.

According to recent estimates in Europe, about 5 to 10% of disability-adjusted life years (DALYs) lost are due to environmental causes. By far the most important factor is fine particulate matter pollution in urban air. Similarly, environmental exposures have been estimated to contribute to 4.9 million (8.7%) deaths and 86 million (5.7%) DALYs globally. In the United States, Superfund sites created by various companies have been found to be hazardous to human and environmental health in nearby communities. It was this perceived threat, raising the specter of miscarriages, mutations, birth defects, and cancers that most frightened the public.

=== Air quality ===
Air quality includes ambient outdoor air quality and indoor air quality. Large concerns about air quality include environmental tobacco smoke, air pollution by forms of chemical waste, and other concerns.

==== Outdoor air quality ====
Air pollution is globally responsible for over 6.5 million deaths each year, as of 2022. Air pollution is often a risk-factor for diseases like lung cancer, respiratory infections, asthma, heart disease, and other forms of respiratory-related illnesses. Reducing air pollution, and thus developing air quality, has been found to decrease adult mortality.

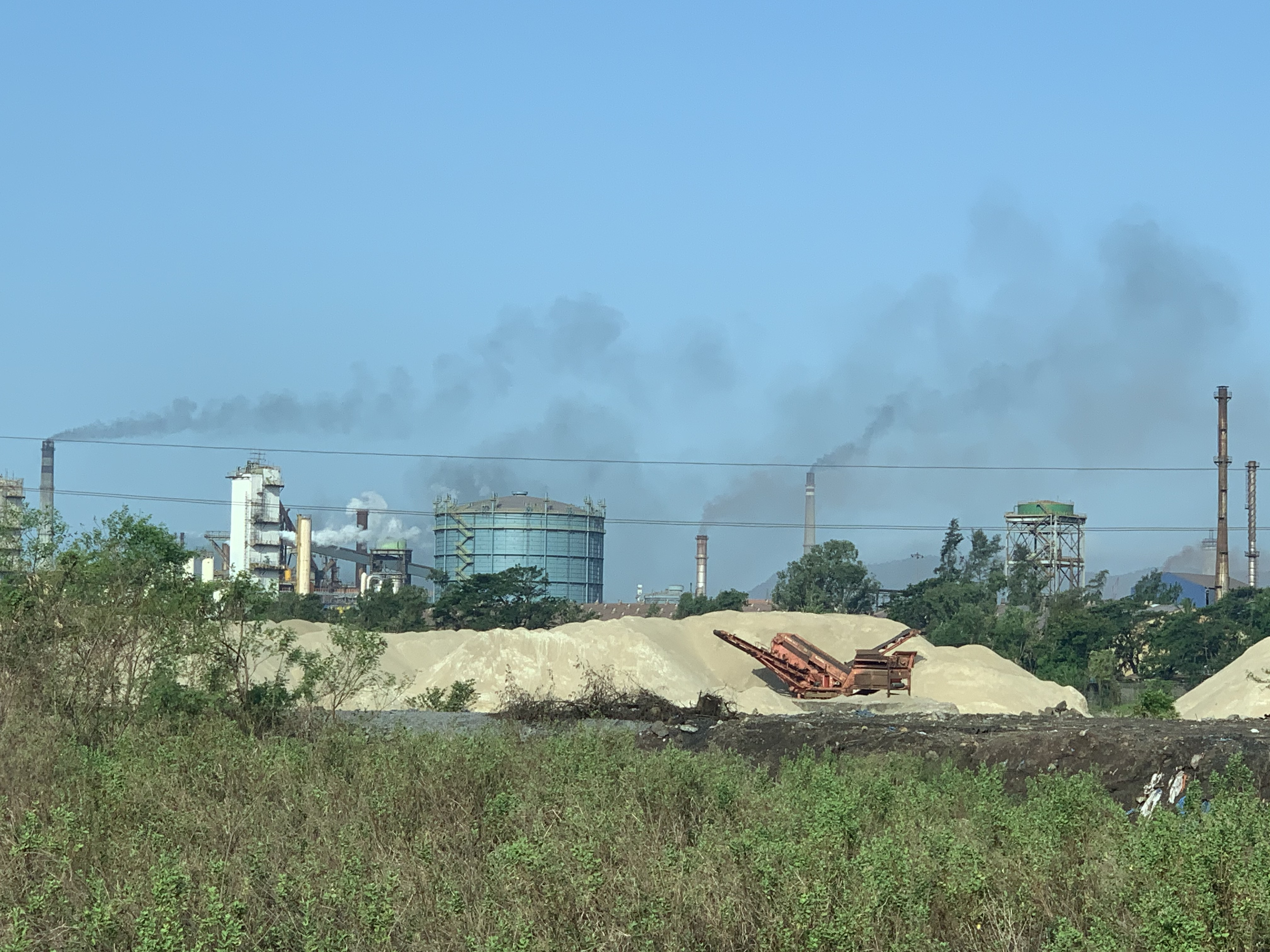
A Mumbai factory releasing air pollution.

Common products responsible for emissions include road traffic, energy production, household combustion, aviation and motor vehicles, and other forms of pollutants. These pollutants are responsible for the burning of fuel, which can release harmful particles into the air that humans and other living organisms can inhale or ingest.

Air pollution is associated with adverse health effects like respiratory and cardiovascular diseases, cancer, related illnesses, and even death. The risk of air pollution is determined by the pollutant's hazard and the amount of exposure that affects a person. For example, a child who plays outdoor sports will have a higher likelihood of outdoor air pollution exposure than an adult who tends to spend more time indoors, whether at work or elsewhere. Environmental health officials work to detect individuals who are at higher risk of exposure to air pollution, detect risk factors present in communities, and work to decrease overall community exposure.

==== Indoor air quality ====
Household air pollution contributes to diseases that kill almost 4.3 million people every year, as of 2014. Indoor air pollution contributes to risk factors for diseases like heart disease, pulmonary disease, stroke, pneumonia, and other associated illnesses. For vulnerable populations, such as children and elderly populations, who spend large amounts of their time indoors, poor indoor air quality can be dangerous.

Burning fuels like coal or kerosene inside homes can cause dangerous chemicals to be released into the air. Dampness and mold in houses can cause diseases, but few studies have been performed on mold in schools and workplaces. Environmental tobacco smoke is considered to be a leading contributor to indoor air pollution since exposure to second and third-hand smoke is a common risk factor. Tobacco smoke contains over 60 carcinogens, where 18% are known human carcinogens. Exposure to these chemicals can lead to exacerbation of asthma, the development of cardiovascular diseases and cardiopulmonary diseases, and an increase in the likelihood of cancer development.

=== Climate change and its effects on health ===
Climate change, in addition to its other effects, makes extreme weather events more likely, including ozone smog events, dust storms, and elevated aerosol levels, all due to extreme heat, drought, winds, and rainfall. These extreme weather events can increase the likelihood of undernutrition, mortality, food insecurity, and climate-sensitive infectious diseases in vulnerable populations. The effects of climate change are felt by the whole world, but disproportionately affect disadvantaged populations who are subject to climate change vulnerability.

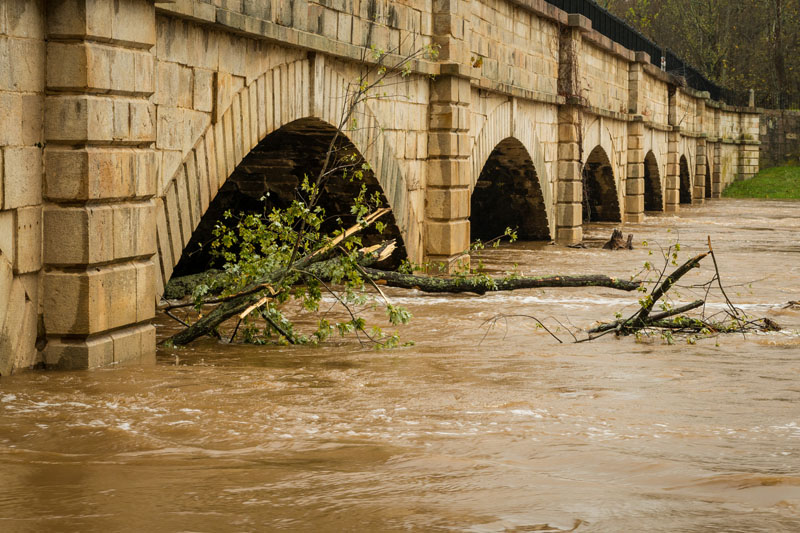
Water runoff in Maryland, USA.

Climate impacts can affect exposure to water-borne pathogens through increased rates of runoff, frequent heavy rains, and the effects of severe storms. Extreme weather events and storm surges can also exceed the capacity of water infrastructure, which can increase the likelihood that populations will be exposed to these contaminants. Exposure to these contaminants are more likely in low-income communities, where they have inadequate infrastructure to respond to climate disasters and are less likely to recover from infrastructure damage as quickly.

Problems like the loss of homes, loved ones, and previous ways of life are often what people face after a climate disaster occurs. These events can lead to vulnerability in the form of housing affordability stress, lower household income, lack of community attachment, grief, and anxiety around another disaster occurring.

=== Environmental racism ===
Certain groups of people can be put at a higher risk for environmental hazards like air, soil and water pollution. This often happens due to marginalization, economic and political processes, and racism. Environmental racism uniquely affects different groups globally; however generally the most marginalized groups of any region are most affected. These marginalized groups are frequently put next to pollution sources like major roadways, toxic waste sites, landfills, and chemical plants. In a 2021 study, it was found that racial and ethnic minority groups in the United States are exposed to disproportionately high levels of particulate air pollution. Racial housing policies that exist in the United States continue to exacerbate racial minority exposure to air pollution at a disproportionate rate, even as overall pollution levels have declined. Likewise, in a 2022 study, it was shown that implementing policy changes that favor wealth redistribution could double as climate change mitigation measures. For populations who are not subject to wealth redistribution measures, this means more money will flow into their communities while climate effects are mitigated.

=== Noise pollution ===
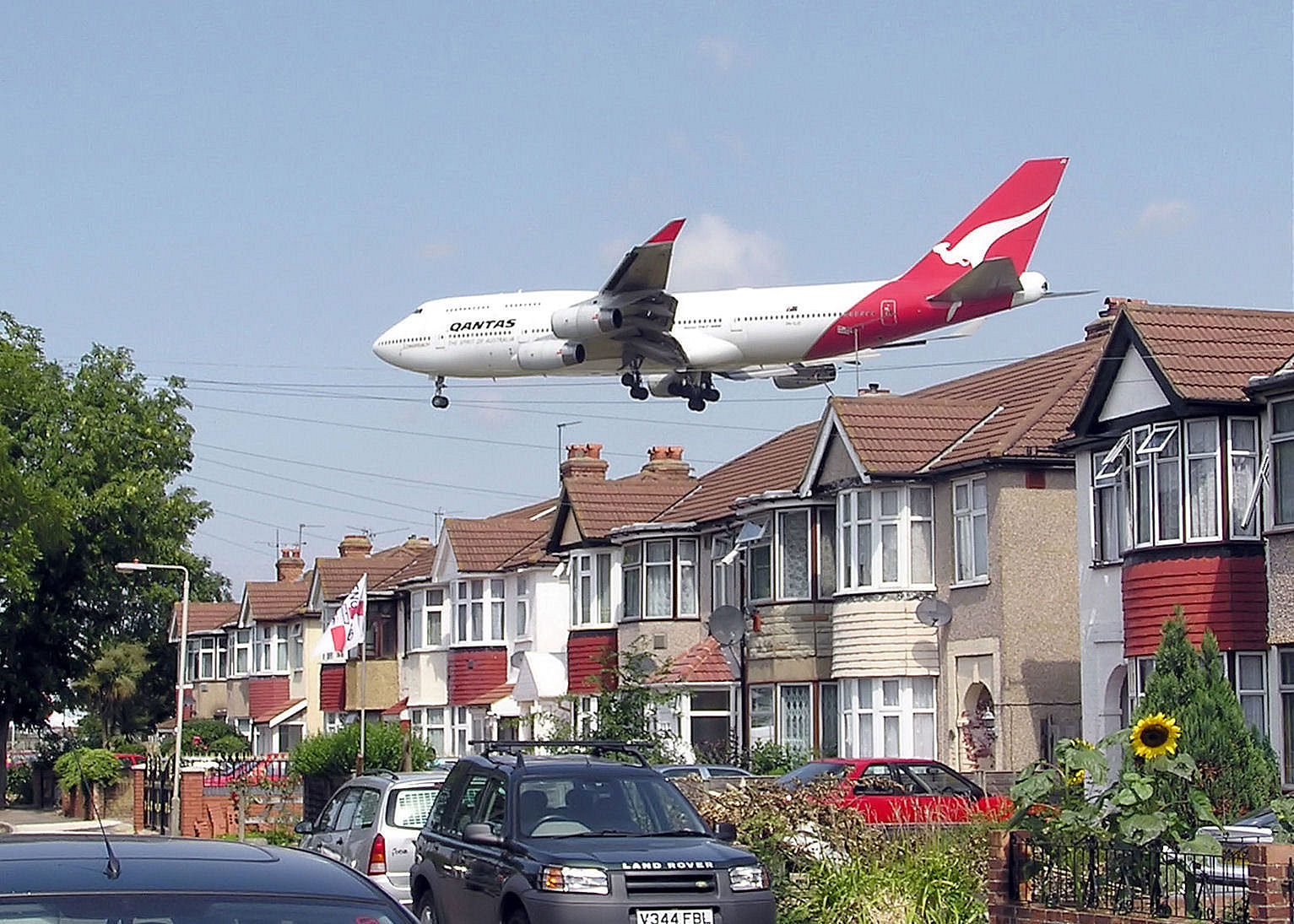
Airplane flying over a residential district.

Noise pollution is usually environmental, machine-created sound that can disrupt activities or communication between humans and other forms of life. Exposure to persistent noise pollution can cause numerous ailments like hearing impairment, sleep disturbances, cardiovascular problems, annoyance, problems with communication and other diseases. For American minorities that live in neighborhoods of low socioeconomic status, they often experience higher levels of noise pollution compared to their higher socioeconomic counterparts.

Noise pollution can cause or exacerbate cardiovascular diseases, which can further contribute to a larger range of diseases, increase stress levels, and cause sleep disturbances. Noise pollution is also responsible for many reported cases of hearing loss, tinnitus, and other forms of hypersensitivity(stress/irritability) or lack thereof to sound(present or subconscious from continuous exposure). These conditions can be dangerous to children and young adults who consistently experience noise pollution, as many of these conditions can develop into long-term problems, including physical and mental health issues.

Children who attend school in noisy traffic zones have been shown to have 15% lower memory development compared to other students who attended schools in quiet traffic zones, according to a Barcelona study. This is consistent with research that suggests that children who are exposed to regular aircraft noise "have inadequate performance on standardised achievement tests."

Exposure to persistent noise pollution can cause one to develop hearing impairments, like tinnitus or impaired speech discrimination. One of the largest factors in worsened mental health due to noise pollution is annoyance. Annoyance due to environmental factors has been found to increase stress reactions and overall feelings of stress among adults. The level of annoyance felt by an individual varies, but contributes significantly to worsened mental health.

Noise exposure also contributes to sleep disturbances, which can cause daytime sleepiness and an overall lack of sleep, which contributes to worsened health. Daytime sleepiness has been linked to several reports of declining mental health and other health issues, job insecurity and further social and environmental factors declining.

=== Safe drinking water ===
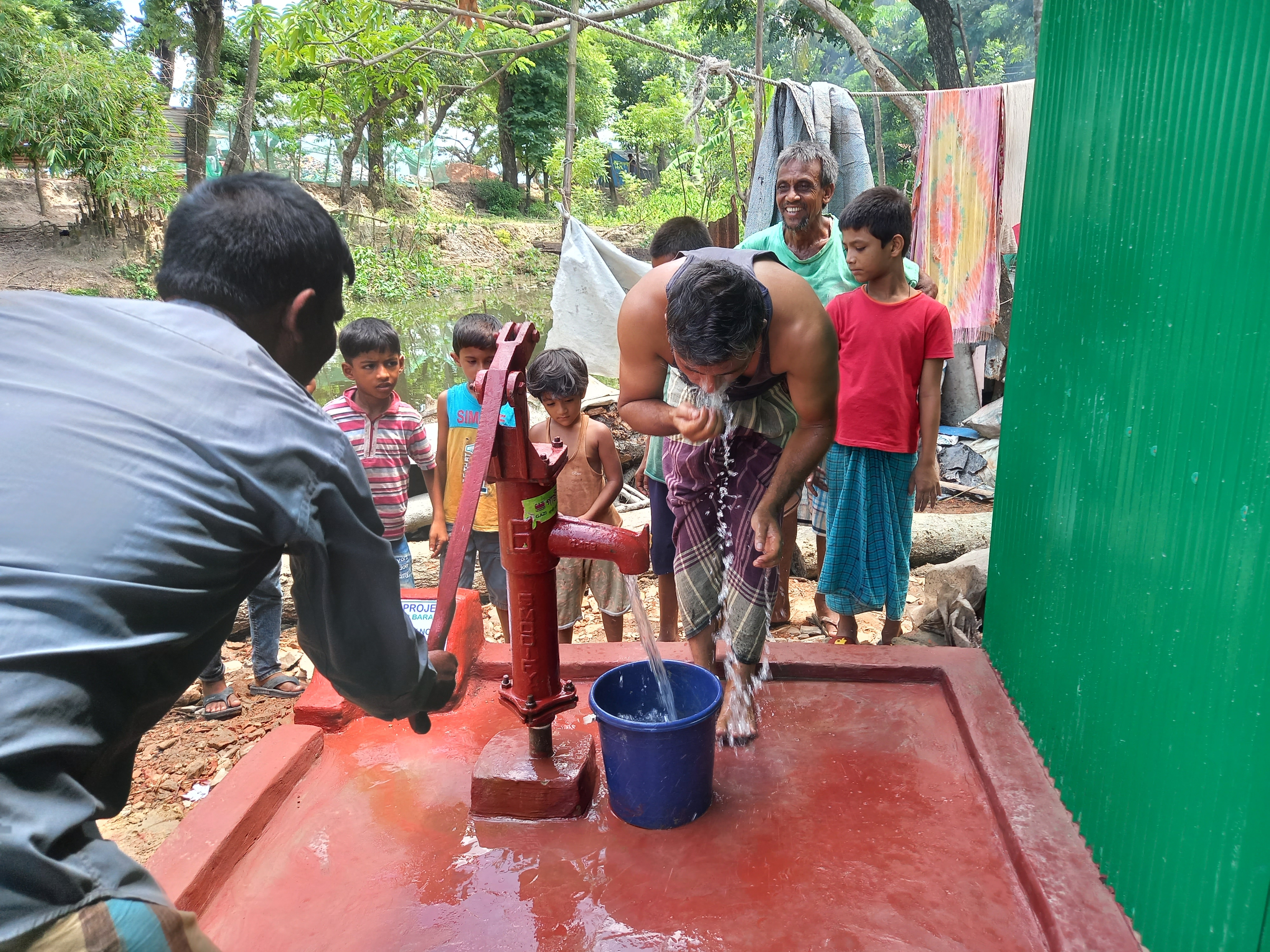
Well installation for safe drinking water.

Access to safe drinking water is considered a "basic human need for health and well-being" by the United Nations. According to their reports, over 2 billion people worldwide live without access to safe drinking water. In 2017, almost 22 million Americans drank from water systems that violated public health standards. Globally, over 2 billion people drink feces-contaminated water, which poses the greatest threat to drinking water safety. Contaminated drinking water could transmit diseases like cholera, dysentery, typhoid, diarrhea and polio.

Harmful chemicals in drinking water can negatively affect health. Unsafe water management practices can increase the prevalence of water-borne diseases and sanitation-related illnesses. Inadequate disinfecting of wastewater in industrial and agricultural centers can also infect hundreds of millions of people with contaminated water. Chemicals like fluoride and arsenic can benefit humans when the levels of these chemicals are controlled; but other, more dangerous chemicals like lead and metals can be harmful to humans.

In America, communities of color can be subject to poor-quality water. In communities in America with large Hispanic and black populations, there is a correlated rise in SDWA health violations. Populations who have experienced a lack of safe drinking water, like populations in Flint, Michigan, are more likely to distrust tap water in their communities. Populations that experience this are commonly low-income communities of color.

=== Hazardous materials management ===
Hazardous materials management, including hazardous waste management, contaminated site remediation, the prevention of leaks from underground storage tanks and the prevention of hazardous materials releases to the environment and responses to emergencies resulting from such releases. When hazardous materials are not managed properly, waste can pollute nearby water sources and reduce air quality.

According to a study done in Austria, people who live near industrial sites are "more often unemployed, have lower education levels, and are twice as likely to be immigrants. With the interest of environmental health in mind, the Resource Conservation and Recovery Act was passed in the United States in 1976 which covered how to properly manage hazardous waste.

There are a variety of occupations that work with hazardous materials and help manage them so that everything is disposed of correctly. These professionals work in various sectors, including government agencies, private industry, consulting firms, and non-profit organizations, all with the common goal of ensuring the safe handling of hazardous materials and waste. These positions include but are not limited to Environmental Health and Safety Specialists, Waste collectors, Medical Professionals, and Emergency Responders. Handling waste, especially hazardous materials is considered one of the most dangerous occupations in the world. Often, these workers may not have all the information about the specific hazardous materials they encounter, making their jobs even more dangerous. The sudden exposure to materials they are not properly prepared to handle can lead to severe consequences. This emphasizes the importance of training, safety protocols, and the use of personal protective equipment for those working with hazardous waste.

=== Microplastic pollution ===
Humans are exposed to toxic chemicals and microplastics at all stages in the plastics life cycle.

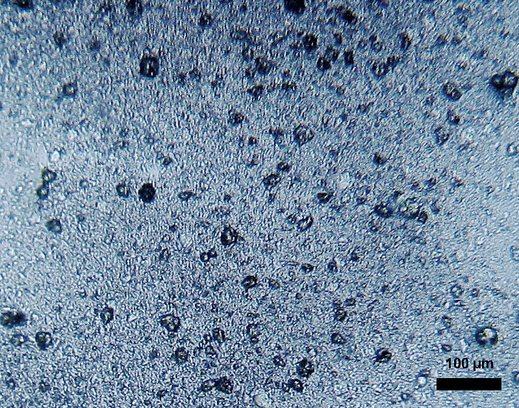
Microplastics shown under a microscope at 100x magnification

The effects of microplastics on human health are a subject of ongoing study. These extremely small plastic particles originate from larger plastics and have been detected in high volumes in human biological samples, air, water, and food. This has raised concerns about the long-term impacts on human health.

Plastic particles smaller than 5mm are considered microplastics (MPs). Particles smaller than 1μm are nanoplastics (NP), which are too small to be seen by the human eye. Nanoplastics remain less studied than larger plastic debris, and their long-term health impacts are still being investigated. Given their minute size, nanoplastics can penetrate biological barriers and accumulate in human tissues, raising questions about potential health effects.

Micro- and nanoplastics (MNPs) have been detected in multiple organs and tissues, as well as human feces, urine, breastmilk, and neonatal meconium, suggesting widespread exposure and absorption. Larger MNPs are thought to be filtered out by normal bodily defenses, such as by mucus in the nose or by coughing. However, "ultrafine" particles are able to enter the circulatory system through the lungs. Additionally, when MNPs are introduced directly into the bloodstream, such as during medical treatment, they bypass our natural defenses.

Although experimental studies within cell cultures and animals have shown possible biological effects, human evidence remains limited, and long-term health risks are still being researched. A 2024 systematic review of human and animal observational studies concluded that MNPs are "suspected" to be harmful to human reproductive, respiratory, and digestive health.

The World Health Organization has acknowledged growing concerns, but note that standardized measurement methods and risks have not been established, calling for further research and improved management of plastic throughout its life-cycle.

=== Soil pollution ===
Contaminated or polluted soil directly affects human health through direct contact with soil or via inhalation of soil contaminants that have vaporized. Potentially greater threats are posed by the infiltration of soil contaminants into groundwater aquifers used for irrigation or direct human consumption, sometimes in areas far from any apparent source of above-ground contamination (long-range diffuse soil contamination). Toxic metals can also make their way up the food chain through plants that reside in soils containing high concentrations of heavy metals. This tends to result in the development of pollution-related diseases.

Most exposure to soil contamination is accidental, and can happen through:

- Ingesting dust or soil directly
- Ingesting food or vegetables grown in contaminated soil or with foods in contact with contaminants
- Skin contact with dust or soil
- Vapors from the soil
- Inhaling clouds of dust while working in soils or windy environments

However, some studies estimate that 90% of human exposure is through eating contaminated food.

== Information and mapping ==
The Toxicology and Environmental Health Information Program (TEHIP) is a comprehensive toxicology and environmental health web site that includes open access to resources produced by US government agencies and organizations, maintained under the umbrella of the Specialized Information Service at the United States National Library of Medicine. TEHIP was responsible for the Toxicology Data Network (TOXNET), an integrated system of toxicology and environmental health databases including the Hazardous Substances Data Bank, that was open access. TOXNET was retired in 2019.

There are many environmental health mapping tools. TOXMAP is a geographic information system (GIS) from the Division of Specialized Information Services of the United States National Library of Medicine (NLM) that uses maps of the United States to help users visually explore data from the United States Environmental Protection Agency's (EPA) Toxics Release Inventory and Superfund Basic Research Programs. TOXMAP is a resource funded by the US federal government. TOXMAP's chemical and environmental health information is taken from the NLM's Toxicology Data Network (TOXNET) and PubMed, and from other authoritative sources.

== Environmental health profession ==
Environmental health professionals may be known as environmental health officers, public health inspectors, environmental health specialists or environmental health practitioners. Researchers and policy-makers also play important roles in how environmental health is practiced in the field. In many European countries, physicians and veterinarians are involved in environmental health. Many countries require graduate degrees and professional licenses to practice environmental health.

The environmental health profession had its modern-day roots in the sanitary and public health movement of the United Kingdom. This was epitomized by Sir Edwin Chadwick, who was instrumental in the repeal of the poor laws, and in 1884 was the founding president of the Association of Public Sanitary Inspectors, now called the Chartered Institute of Environmental Health.

== See also ==
- EcoHealth
- Environmental disease
- Environmental medicine
- Environmental toxicology
- Epigenetics
- Exposure science
- Healing environments
- Health effects from noise
- Heavy metals
- Indoor air quality
- Industrial and organizational psychology
- Livability
- NIEHS
- Nightingale's environmental theory
- One Health
- Pollution
- Volatile organic compound

Journals:

- List of environmental health journals
