= Gluteus medius tendonitis =

Syndrome

The gluteus maximus

Gluteus medius tendonitis, also known as gluteal amnesia or colloquially as dead butt syndrome, is a lifestyle disease that affects the gluteus maximus muscle characterized by a lack of muscle tone and strength in the buttocks, typically from excess sitting.

== Description ==
Gluteal amnesia is a condition associated with prolonged sitting, particularly among office workers who spend most of their day seated. This condition affects the gluteus maximus muscle, which plays an important role in standing, walking, and hip movement.

The gluteus maximus—one in each buttock—is one of the largest and strongest muscles in the body. However, these muscles can become tight and underactive if they are not used regularly, hence the use of the term "amnesia". Pain or discomfort may develop after prolonged and repeated sitting, sometimes contributing to lower back pain and, in some cases, irritation of the sciatic nerve. As the gluteal muscles become weak or underactive, other muscles, such as those in the lower back and the hamstrings, may compensate and become overworked.

== Prevention ==
One of the most effective ways to avoid the effects of this syndrome is to reduce prolonged sitting. When this is not possible (especially for professional reasons), simple physical exercises that activate the gluteal muscles can help restore strength and proper muscle activation.
