= Environmental disease =

Class of non-hereditary diseases

In epidemiology, environmental diseases are diseases that can be directly attributed to environmental factors (as distinct from genetic factors or infection). Apart from the true monogenic genetic disorders, which are rare, environment is a major determinant of the development of disease. Diet, exposure to toxins, pathogens, radiation, and chemicals found in almost all personal care products and household cleaners, stress, racism, and physical and mental abuse are causes of a large segment of non-hereditary disease. If a disease process is concluded to be the result of a combination of genetic and environmental factor influences, its etiological origin can be referred to as having a multifactorial pattern.

There are many different types of environmental disease including:

- Disease caused by physical factors in the environment, such as skin cancer caused by excessive exposure to ultraviolet radiation in sunlight
- Disease caused by exposure to toxic or irritant chemicals in the environment such as toxic metals
- Disease caused by exposures to toxins from biologic agents in the environment, such as aflatoxicosis from molds that produce aflatoxin
- Disease caused by exposure to toxic social factors in the environment, such as racism
- Lifestyle disease such as cardiovascular disease, diseases caused by substance abuse such as alcoholism, and smoking-related disease

== Environmental diseases vs. pollution-related diseases ==
Environmental diseases are a direct result from the environment. Meanwhile, pollution-related diseases are attributed to exposure to toxicants or toxins in the air, water, and soil. Therefore, all pollution-related disease are environmental diseases, but not all environmental diseases are pollution-related diseases.

== Urban-associated diseases ==
Urban areas are highly dense regions that currently hold ~50% of the global population, a number expected to grow to 70% by 2050, and produce over 80% of the global GDP. These areas are known to have a higher incidence of certain diseases, which is of particular concern given their rapid growth. The urban environment includes many risk factors for a variety of different environmental diseases. Some of these risk factors, for instance, air-pollution, are well known, while others such as altered microbial exposure are less familiar to the general public. For instance, asthma can be induced and exacerbated by combustion related pollution, which is more prevalent in urban areas. On the other hand, urban areas, compared to their rural counterparts, lack diverse microbial communities, which can help prevent the development of asthma. Both of these effects lead to a higher incidence of asthma in cities. Infectious diseases are also often more common in cities, as transfer between hosts is facilitated by high population densities. However, recent research shows that increased access to healthcare weakens the urban association with these diseases, and the net effect is still unclear. Many mental health disorders have also been associated with urban areas, especially in low socioeconomic areas. Increased levels of stress, air & light & noise pollution, and reduced "green" space are all urban-associated environmental effects that are adversely linked to mental health. Though urban areas are often correlated with dirtiness and disease, they are likely to have more access to higher quality health care which can lead to more positive health outcomes. This benefit will continue to grow as innovation in health technologies steadily rises. Taking this into account, while overall trends do exist, urban risk factors are nuanced and often city and context dependent.

== Chemicals ==
=== Metals ===
Poisoning by lead and mercury has been known since antiquity. Other toxic metals or metals that are known to evoke adverse immune reactions are arsenic, phosphorus, zinc, beryllium, cadmium, chromium, manganese, nickel, cobalt, osmium, platinum, selenium, tellurium, thallium, uranium, and vanadium.

=== Halogens ===
There are many other diseases likely to have been caused by common anions found in natural drinking water. Fluoride is one of the most common found in drier climates where the geology favors release of fluoride ions to soil as the rocks decompose. In Sri Lanka, 90% of the country is underlain by crystalline metamorphic rocks of which most carry mica as a major mineral. Mica carries fluoride in their structure and releases to soil when decomposes. In the dry and arid climates, fluoride concentrates on top soil and slowly dissolves in shallow groundwater. This has been the cause of high fluoride levels in drinking water where the majority of the rural Sri Lankans obtain their drinking water from backyard wells. High fluoride in drinking water has caused a high incidence of fluorosis among dry zone population in Sri Lanka. However, in the wet zone, high rainfall effectively removes fluoride from soils where no fluorosis is evident. In some parts of Sri Lanka iodine deficiency has also been noted which has been identified as a result of iodine fixation by hydrated iron oxide found in lateritic soils in wet coastal lowlands.

=== Organic compounds ===
Additionally, there are environmental diseases caused by the aromatic carbon compounds including : benzene, hexachlorocyclohexane, toluene diisocyanate, phenol, pentachlorophenol, quinone and hydroquinone.

Also included are the aromatic nitro-, amino-, and pyridilium-deratives: nitrobenzene, dinitrobenzene, trinitrotoluene, paramethylaminophenol sulfate (Metol), dinitro-ortho-cresol, aniline, trinitrophenylmethylnitramine (tetryl), hexanitrodiphenylamine (aurantia), phenylenediamines, and paraquat.

The aliphatic carbon compounds can also cause environmental disease. Included in these are methanol, nitroglycerine, nitrocellulose, dimethylnitrosamine, and the halogenated hydrocarbons: methyl chloride, methyl bromide, trichloroethylene, carbon tetrachloride, and the chlorinated naphthalenes. Also included are glycols: ethylene chlorhydrin and diethylene dioxide

=== Noxious gases ===
Noxious gases can be categorized as : Simple asphyxiants, chemical asphyxiants, and irritant gases. The simple asphyxiants are nitrogen, methane, and carbon dioxide. The chemical asphyxiants are carbon monoxide, sulfuretted hydrogen and hydrogen cyanide.

The irritant gases are sulfur dioxide, ammonia, nitrogen dioxide, chlorine, phosgene, and fluorine and its compounds, which include luroine and hydrofluoric acid, fluorspar, fluorapatite, cryolite, and organic fluorine compounds.

== Categorization and surveillance ==
The U.S. Coast Guard has developed a Coast Guard-wide comprehensive system for surveillance of workplace diseases.

The American Medical Association's fifth edition of the Current Medical Information and Terminology (CMIT) was used as a reference to expand the basic list of 50 Sentinel Health Events (Occupational) [SHE(O)] published by the National Institute for Occupational Health and Safety (NIOSH), September, 1983.

== See also ==
- Effects of deforestation on public health
- Environmental health
- Environmental medicine
- Occupational disease
- Phenocopy
- Risk factor
- Microplastics
- Safe (1995 film)

== Notes ==
- The Diseases of Occupations, Sixth Edition, Donald Hunter, C.B.E., D.Sc., M.D., F.R.C.P., Hodder and Stoughton, London. ISBN 0-340-22084-8, 1978.
- Aviat Space Environ Med. 1991 Aug;62(8):795-7.
- Use of sentinel health events (occupational) in computer assisted occupational health surveillance. Stockwell JR, Adess ML, Titlow TB, Zaharias GR. U.S. Coast Guard Office of Health Services, Washington, D.C.
