= Disease =

Condition negatively affecting an organism

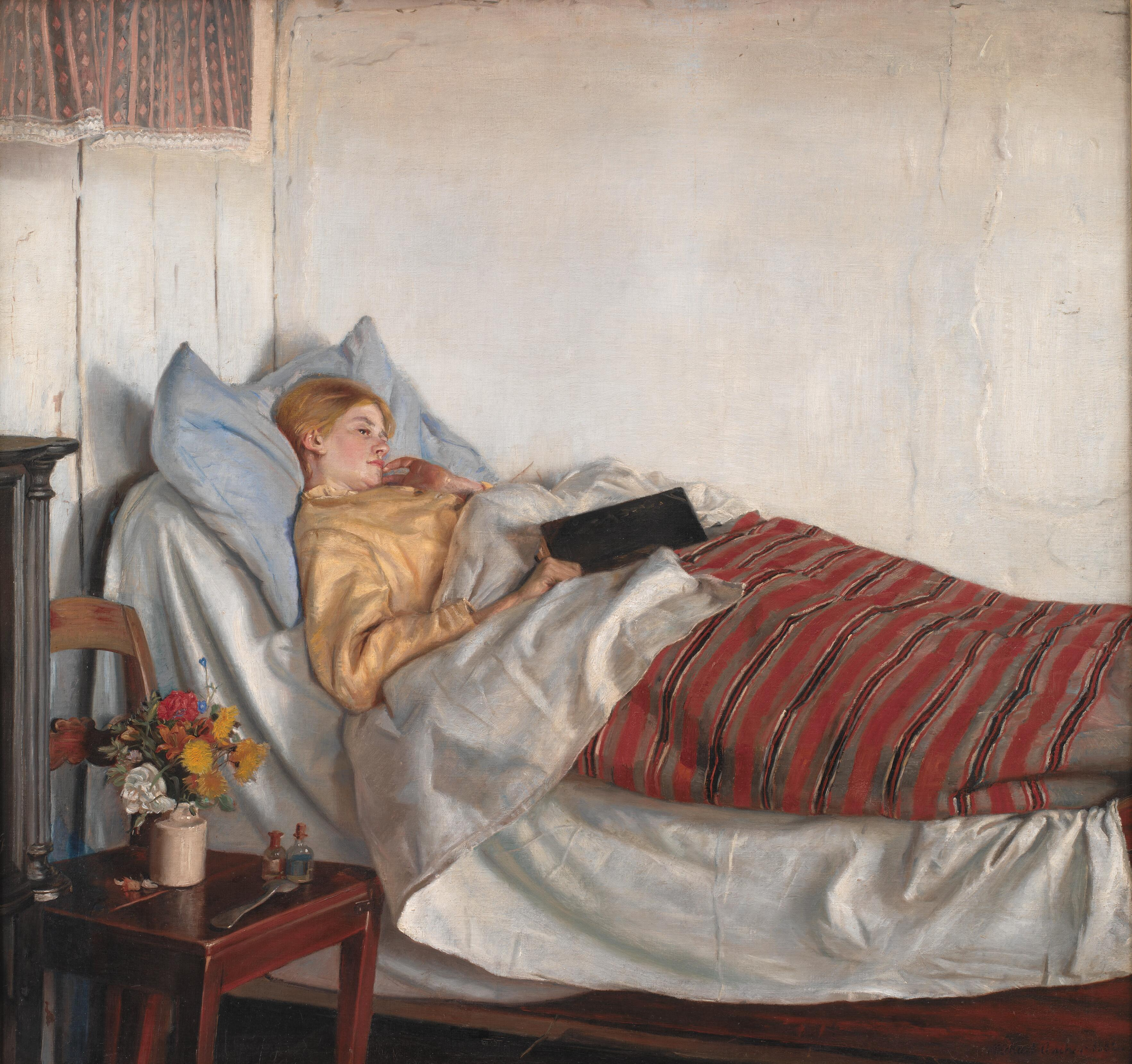
"The Sick Girl", by Michael Ancher, 1882, National Gallery of Denmark

A disease is a particular abnormal condition that adversely affects the structure or function of all or part of an organism and is not immediately due to any external injury. Diseases are often known to be medical conditions that are associated with specific signs and symptoms. A disease may be caused by external factors such as pathogens or by internal dysfunctions. For example, internal dysfunctions of the immune system can produce a variety of different diseases, including various forms of immunodeficiency, hypersensitivity, allergies, and autoimmune disorders.

In humans, disease is often used more broadly to refer to any condition that causes or can cause pain, dysfunction, distress, social problems, or death to the person affected, or similar problems for those in contact with the person. In this broader sense, it sometimes includes injuries, disabilities, disorders, syndromes, infections, isolated symptoms, deviant behaviors, and atypical variations of structure and function, while in other contexts and for other purposes these may be considered distinguishable categories. Diseases can affect people not only physically but also mentally, as contracting and living with a disease can alter the affected person's perspective on life.

Death due to disease is called death by natural causes. There are four main types of disease: infectious diseases, deficiency diseases, hereditary diseases, and physiological diseases. Diseases can also be classified in other ways, such as communicable versus non-communicable diseases. The deadliest diseases in humans are ischemic heart disease (blood flow obstruction), followed by stroke and COPD (a lung disease). In developed countries, the diseases that cause the most sickness overall are neuropsychiatric conditions, such as depression and anxiety.

Pathology, the study of disease, includes etiology, or the study of cause, e.g., one may look at the syndrome of acquired immunodeficiency (AIDS) or the causal agents: human immunodeficiency viruses (HIVs).

== Terminology ==
=== Concepts ===
In many cases, terms such as disease, disorder, morbidity, sickness and illness are used interchangeably; however, there are situations when specific terms are considered preferable.

Disease
The term disease broadly refers to any condition that impairs the normal functioning of the body. For this reason, diseases are associated with the dysfunction of the body's normal homeostatic processes. Commonly, the term is used to refer specifically to infectious diseases, which are clinically evident diseases that result from the presence of pathogenic microbial agents, including viruses, bacteria, fungi, protozoa, multicellular organisms, and aberrant proteins known as prions. An infection or colonization that does not and will not produce clinically evident impairment of normal functioning, such as the presence of the normal bacteria and yeasts in the gut, or of a passenger virus, is not considered a disease. By contrast, an infection that is asymptomatic during its incubation period, but expected to produce symptoms later, is usually considered a disease. Non-infectious diseases are all other diseases, including most forms of cancer, heart disease, and genetic disease.
Acquired disease
An acquired disease is one that began at some point during one's lifetime, as opposed to disease that was already present at birth, which is congenital disease. Acquired sounds like it could mean "caught via contagion", but it simply means acquired sometime after birth. It also sounds like it could imply secondary disease, but acquired disease can be primary disease.
Acute disease
An acute disease is one of a short-term nature (acute); the term sometimes also connotes a fulminant nature
Chronic condition or chronic disease
A chronic disease is one that persists over time, often for at least six months, but may also include illnesses that are expected to last for the entirety of one's natural life.
Congenital disorder or congenital disease
A congenital disorder is one that is present at birth. It is often a genetic disease or disorder and can be inherited. It can also be the result of a vertically transmitted infection from the mother, such as HIV/AIDS.
Genetic disease
A genetic disorder or disease is caused by one or more genetic mutations. It is often inherited, but some mutations are random and de novo.
Hereditary or inherited disease
A hereditary disease is a type of genetic disease caused by genetic mutations that are hereditary (and can run in families)
Iatrogenic disease
An iatrogenic disease or condition is one that is caused by medical intervention, whether as a side effect of a treatment or as an inadvertent outcome.
Idiopathic disease
An idiopathic disease has an unknown cause or source. As medical science has advanced, many diseases with entirely unknown causes have had some aspects of their sources explained and therefore shed their idiopathic status. For example, when germs were discovered, it became known that they were a cause of infection, but particular germs and diseases had not been linked. In another example, it is known that autoimmunity is the cause of some forms of diabetes mellitus type 1, even though the particular molecular pathways by which it works are not yet understood. It is also common to know certain factors are associated with certain diseases; however, association does not necessarily imply causality. For example, a third factor might be causing both the disease, and the associated phenomenon.
Incurable disease
A disease that cannot be cured. Incurable diseases are not necessarily terminal diseases, and sometimes a disease's symptoms can be treated sufficiently for the disease to have little or no impact on quality of life.
Primary disease
A primary disease is a disease that is due to a root cause of illness, as opposed to secondary disease, which is a sequela, or complication that is caused by the primary disease. For example, a common cold is a primary disease, where rhinitis is a possible secondary disease, or sequela. A doctor must determine what primary disease, a cold or bacterial infection, is causing a patient's secondary rhinitis when deciding whether or not to prescribe antibiotics.
Secondary disease
A secondary disease is a disease that is a sequela or complication of a prior, causal disease, which is referred to as the primary disease or simply the underlying cause (root cause). For example, a bacterial infection can be primary, wherein a healthy person is exposed to bacteria and becomes infected, or it can be secondary to a primary cause, that predisposes the body to infection. For example, a primary viral infection that weakens the immune system could lead to a secondary bacterial infection. Similarly, a primary burn that creates an open wound could provide an entry point for bacteria, and lead to a secondary bacterial infection.
Terminal disease
A terminal disease is one that is expected to have the inevitable result of death. Previously, AIDS was a terminal disease; it is now incurable, but can be managed indefinitely using medications.
Illness
The terms illness and sickness are both generally used as synonyms for disease; however, the term illness is occasionally used to refer specifically to the patient's personal, subjective experience of their disease. In this model, it is possible for a person to have a disease without being ill (to have an objectively definable, but asymptomatic, medical condition, such as a subclinical infection, or to have a clinically apparent physical impairment but not feel sick or distressed by it), and to be ill without being diseased (such as when an objectively healthy person perceives a normal experience as a medical condition, or medicalizes a non-disease situation in their life – for example, a person who feels unwell as a result of embarrassment, and who interprets those feelings as sickness rather than normal emotions). Symptoms of illness are often not directly the result of infection, but a collection of evolved responses – sickness behavior by the body – that helps clear infection and promote recovery. Such aspects of illness can include lethargy, depression, loss of appetite, sleepiness, hyperalgesia, and inability to concentrate.
Disorder
A disorder is a functional abnormality or disturbance that may or may not show specific signs and symptoms. Medical disorders can be categorized into mental disorders, physical disorders, genetic disorders, emotional and behavioral disorders, and functional disorders. The term disorder is often considered more value-neutral and less stigmatizing than the terms disease or illness, and therefore is preferred terminology in some circumstances. In mental health, the term mental disorder is used as a way of acknowledging the complex interaction of biological, social, and psychological factors in psychiatric conditions; however, the term disorder is also used in many other areas of medicine, primarily to identify physical disorders that are not caused by infectious organisms, such as metabolic disorders.
Medical condition or health condition
A medical condition or health condition is a broad concept that includes all diseases, lesions, disorders, or non-pathological condition that normally receives medical treatment, such as pregnancy or childbirth. While the term medical condition generally includes mental illnesses, in some contexts the term is used specifically to denote any illness, injury, or disease except for mental illnesses. The Diagnostic and Statistical Manual of Mental Disorders (DSM), the widely used psychiatric manual that defines all mental disorders, uses the term general medical condition to refer to all diseases, illnesses, and injuries except for mental disorders. This usage is also commonly seen in the psychiatric literature. Some health insurance policies also define a medical condition as any illness, injury, or disease except for psychiatric illnesses.
As it is more value-neutral than terms like disease, the term medical condition is sometimes preferred by people with health issues that they do not consider deleterious. However, by emphasizing the medical nature of the condition, this term is sometimes rejected, such as by proponents of the autism rights movement.
The term medical condition is also a synonym for medical state, in which case it describes an individual patient's current state from a medical standpoint. This usage appears in statements that describe a patient as being in critical condition, for example.
Morbidity
Morbidity (from Latin morbidus 'sick, unhealthy') is a diseased state, disability, or poor health due to any cause. The term may refer to the existence of any form of disease, or to the degree that the health condition affects the patient. Among severely ill patients, the level of morbidity is often measured by ICU scoring systems. Comorbidity, or co-existing disease, is the simultaneous presence of two or more medical conditions, such as schizophrenia and substance abuse.
In epidemiology and actuarial science, the term morbidity (also morbidity rate or morbidity frequency) can refer to either the incidence rate, the prevalence of a disease or medical condition, or the percentage of people who experience a given condition within a given timeframe (e.g., 20% of people will get influenza in a year). This measure of sickness is contrasted with the mortality rate of a condition, which is the proportion of people dying during a given time interval. Morbidity rates are used in actuarial professions, such as health insurance, life insurance, and long-term care insurance, to determine the premiums charged to customers. Morbidity rates help insurers predict the likelihood that an insured will contract or develop any number of specified diseases.
Pathosis or pathology
Pathosis (plural pathoses) is synonymous with disease. The word pathology also has this sense, in which it is commonly used by physicians in the medical literature, although some editors prefer to reserve pathology to its other senses. Sometimes a slight connotative shade causes preference for pathology or pathosis implying "some [as yet poorly analyzed] pathophysiologic process" rather than disease implying "a specific disease entity as defined by diagnostic criteria being already met". This is hard to quantify denotatively, but it explains why cognitive synonymy is not invariable.
Syndrome
A syndrome is the association of several signs and symptoms, or other characteristics that often occur together, regardless of whether the cause is known. Some syndromes such as Down syndrome are known to have only one cause (an extra chromosome at birth). Others such as Parkinsonian syndrome are known to have multiple possible causes. Acute coronary syndrome, for example, is not a single disease itself but is rather the manifestation of any of several diseases including myocardial infarction secondary to coronary artery disease. In yet other syndromes, however, the cause is unknown. A familiar syndrome name often remains in use even after an underlying cause has been found or when there are a number of different possible primary causes. Examples of the first-mentioned type are that Turner syndrome and DiGeorge syndrome are still often called by the "syndrome" name despite that they can also be viewed as disease entities and not solely as sets of signs and symptoms.
Predisease
Predisease is a subclinical or prodromal vanguard of a disease. Prediabetes and prehypertension are common examples. The nosology or epistemology of predisease is contentious, though, because there is seldom a bright line differentiating a legitimate concern for subclinical or premonitory status and the conflict of interest–driven over-medicalization (e.g., by pharmaceutical manufacturers) or de-medicalization (e.g., by medical and disability insurers). Identifying legitimate predisease can result in useful preventive measures, such as motivating the person to get an adequate amount of physical exercise, but labeling a healthy person with an unfounded notion of predisease can result in overtreatment, such as taking drugs that only help people with severe disease or paying for treatments with a poor benefit–cost ratio.
One review proposed three criteria for predisease:
- a high risk for progression to disease making one "far more likely to develop" it than others are- for example, a pre-cancer will almost certainly turn into cancer over time
- actionability for risk reduction – for example, removal of the precancerous tissue prevents it from turning into a potentially deadly cancer
- benefit that outweighs the harm of any interventions taken – removing the precancerous tissue prevents cancer, and thus prevents a potential death from cancer.

=== Types by body system ===
Mental
Mental illness is a broad, generic label for a category of illnesses that may include affective or emotional instability, behavioral dysregulation, cognitive dysfunction or impairment. Specific illnesses known as mental illnesses include major depression, generalized anxiety disorders, and schizophrenia, to name a few. Mental illness can be of biological (e.g., anatomical, chemical, or genetic) or psychological (e.g., trauma or conflict) origin. It can impair the affected person's ability to work or study and can harm interpersonal relationship.
Organic
An organic disease is one caused by a physical or physiological change to some tissue or organ of the body. The term sometimes excludes infections. It is commonly used in contrast with mental disorders. It includes emotional and behavioral disorders if they are due to changes to the physical structures or functioning of the body (such as after a stroke or a traumatic brain injury — organic brain disease is a dated term for such cases) but not if they are due to psychosocial issues.

=== Stages ===
In an infectious disease, the incubation period is the time between infection and the appearance of symptoms. The latency period is the time between infection and the ability of the disease to spread to another person, which may precede, follow, or be simultaneous with the appearance of symptoms. Some viruses also exhibit a dormant phase, called viral latency, in which the virus hides in the body in an inactive state. For example, varicella zoster virus causes chickenpox in the acute phase; after recovery from chickenpox, the virus may remain dormant in nerve cells for many years, and later cause herpes zoster (shingles).

Acute disease
An acute disease is a short-lived disease, like the common cold.
Chronic disease
A chronic disease is one that lasts for a long time, usually at least six months. During that time, it may be constantly present, or it may go into remission and periodically relapse. A chronic disease may be stable (does not get any worse) or it may be progressive (gets worse over time). Some chronic diseases can be permanently cured. Most chronic diseases can be beneficially treated, even if they cannot be permanently cured.
Clinical disease
One that has clinical consequences; in other words, the stage of the disease that produces the characteristic signs and symptoms of that disease. AIDS is the clinical disease stage of HIV infection.
Cure
A cure is the end of a medical condition or a treatment that is very likely to end it, while remission refers to the disappearance, possibly temporarily, of symptoms. Complete remission is the best possible outcome for incurable diseases.
Flare-up

A flare-up can refer to either the recurrence of symptoms or an onset of more severe symptoms.
Progressive disease
Progressive disease is a disease whose typical natural course is the worsening of the disease until death, serious debility, or organ failure occurs. Slowly progressive diseases are also chronic diseases; many are also degenerative diseases. The opposite of progressive disease is stable disease or static disease: a medical condition that exists, but does not get better or worse.
Refractory disease
A refractory disease is a disease that resists treatment, especially an individual case that resists treatment more than is normal for the specific disease in question.
Subclinical disease
Also called silent disease, silent stage, or asymptomatic disease. This is a stage in some diseases before the symptoms are first noted.
Terminal phase
If a person will die soon from a disease, regardless of whether that disease typically causes death, then the stage between the earlier disease process and active dying is the terminal phase.
Recovery
Recovery can refer to the repairing of physical processes (tissues, organs etc.) and the resumption of healthy functioning after damage causing processes have been cured.

=== Extent ===
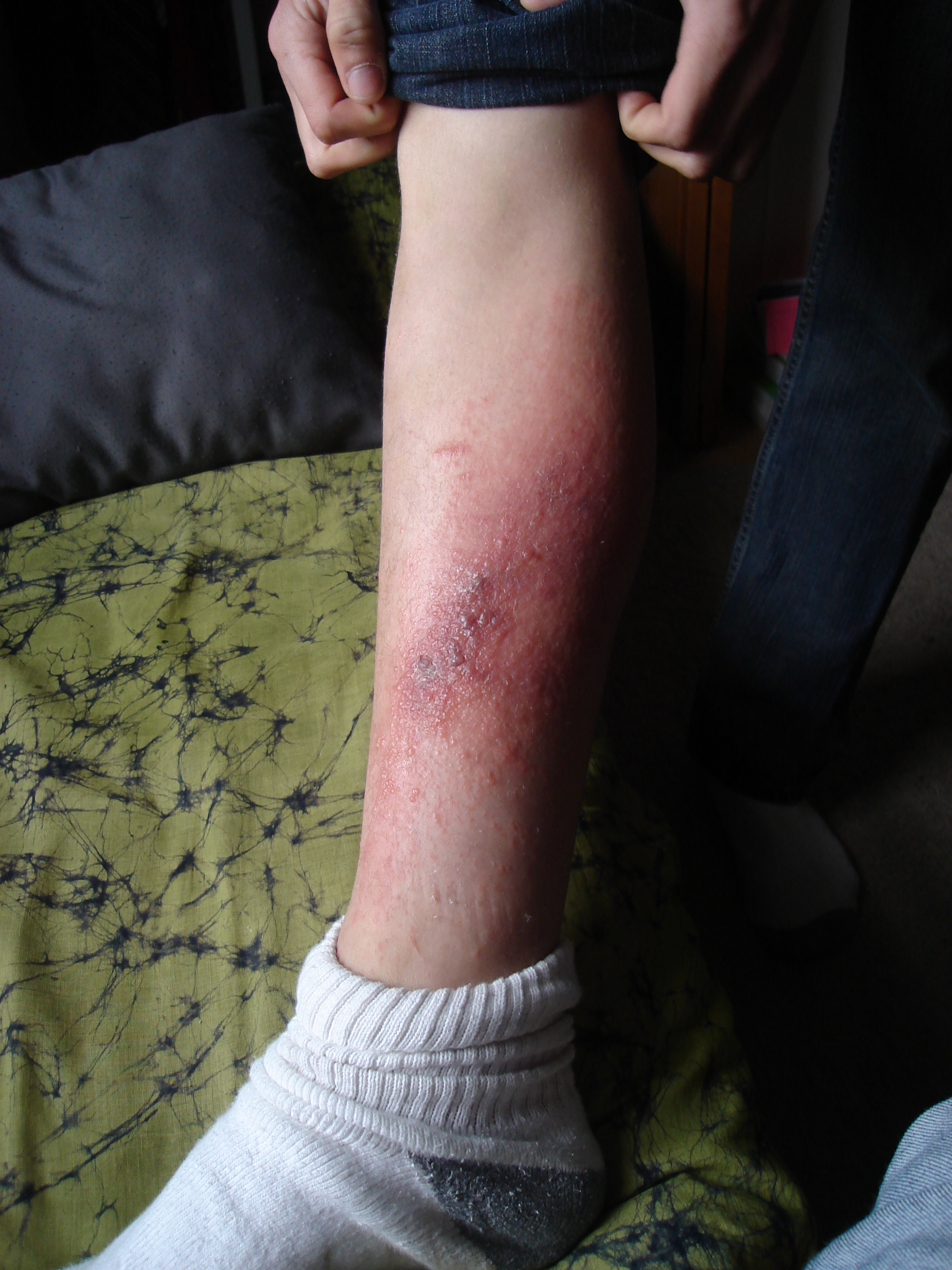
This rash only affects one part of the body, so it is a localized disease.

Localized disease
A localized disease is one that affects only one part of the body, such as athlete's foot or an eye infection.
Disseminated disease
A disseminated disease has spread to other parts; with cancer, this is usually called metastatic disease.
Systemic disease
A systemic disease is a disease that affects the entire body, such as influenza or high blood pressure.

== Classification ==
Diseases may be classified by cause, pathogenesis (mechanism by which the disease is caused), or by symptoms. Alternatively, diseases may be classified according to the organ system involved, though this is often complicated since many diseases affect more than one organ.

A chief difficulty in nosology is that diseases often cannot be defined and classified clearly, especially when cause or pathogenesis are unknown. Thus diagnostic terms often only reflect a symptom or set of symptoms (syndrome).

Classical classification of human disease derives from the observational correlation between pathological analysis and clinical syndromes. Today it is preferred to classify them by their cause if it is known.

The most known and used classification of diseases is the World Health Organization's ICD. This is periodically updated. Currently, the last publication is the ICD-11.

== Causes ==
Diseases can be caused by any number of factors and may be acquired or congenital. Microorganisms, genetics, the environment or a combination of these can contribute to a diseased state.

Only some diseases such as influenza are contagious and commonly believed infectious. The microorganisms that cause these diseases are known as pathogens and include varieties of bacteria, viruses, protozoa, and fungi. Infectious diseases can be transmitted, e.g. by hand-to-mouth contact with infectious material on surfaces, by bites of insects or other carriers of the disease, and from contaminated water or food (often via fecal contamination), etc. Also, there are sexually transmitted diseases. In some cases, microorganisms that are not readily spread from person to person play a role, while other diseases can be prevented or ameliorated with appropriate nutrition or other lifestyle changes.

Some diseases, such as most (but not all) forms of cancer, heart disease, and mental disorders, are non-infectious diseases. Many non-infectious diseases have a partly or completely genetic basis (see genetic disorder) and may thus be transmitted from one generation to another.

Social determinants of health are the social conditions in which people live that determine their health. Illnesses are generally related to social, economic, political, and environmental circumstances. Social determinants of health have been recognized by several health organizations such as the Public Health Agency of Canada and the World Health Organization to greatly influence collective and personal well-being. The World Health Organization's Social Determinants Council also recognizes Social determinants of health in poverty. Climate change can exacerbate the transmission and burden of some infectious diseases.

When the cause of a disease is poorly understood, societies tend to mythologize the disease or use it as a metaphor or symbol of whatever that culture considers evil. For example, until the bacterial cause of tuberculosis was discovered in 1882, experts variously ascribed the disease to heredity, a sedentary lifestyle, depressed mood, and overindulgence in sex, rich food, or alcohol, all of which were social ills at the time.

When a disease is caused by a pathogenic organism (e.g., when malaria is caused by Plasmodium), one should not confuse the pathogen (the cause of the disease) with disease itself. For example, West Nile virus (the pathogen) causes West Nile fever (the disease). The misuse of basic definitions in epidemiology is frequent in scientific publications.

=== Types of causes ===
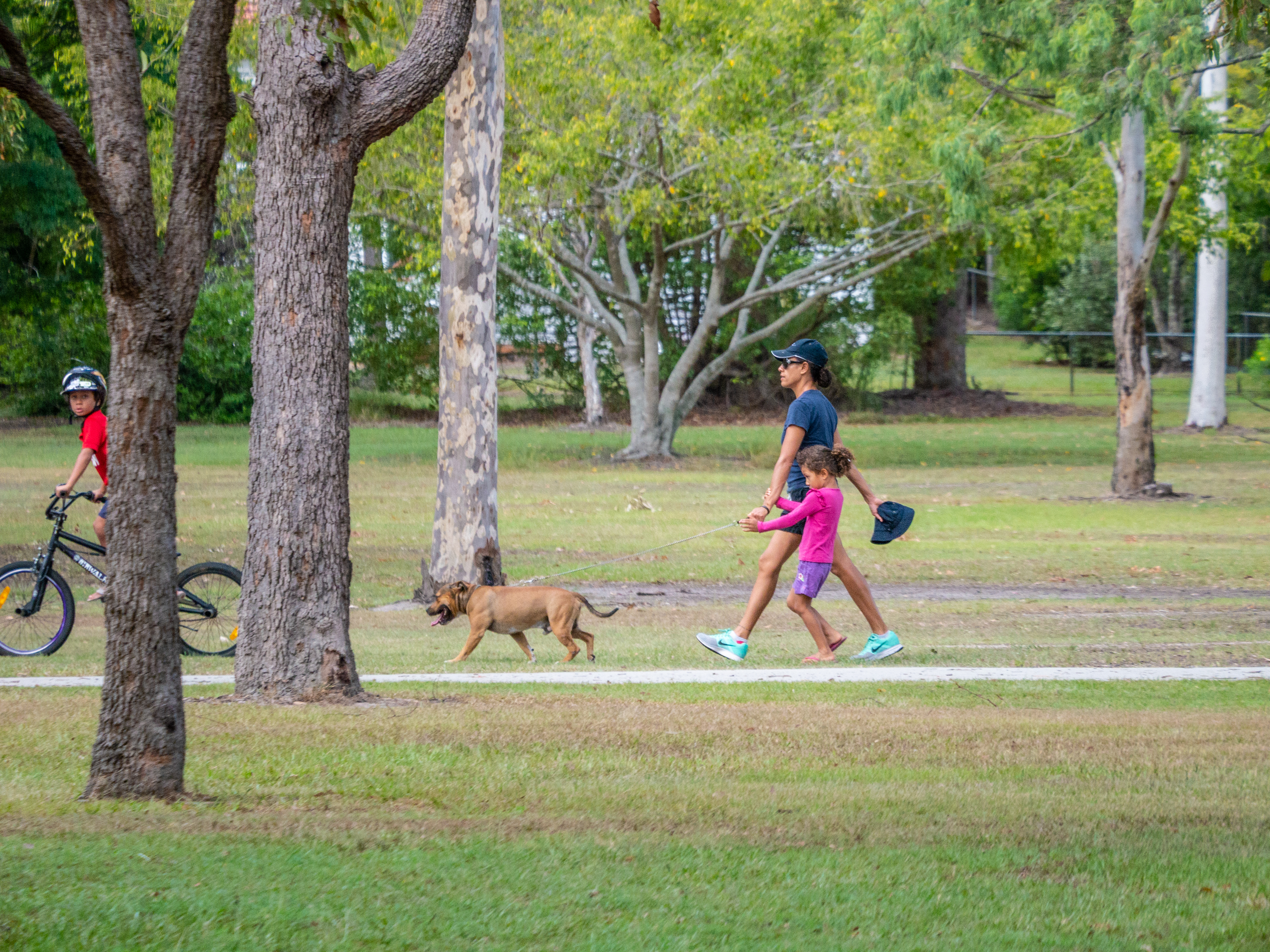
Regular physical activity, such as riding a bicycle or walking, reduces the risk of lifestyle diseases.

Airborne
An airborne disease is any disease that is caused by pathogens and transmitted through the air.
Foodborne
Foodborne illness or food poisoning is any illness resulting from the consumption of food contaminated with pathogenic bacteria, toxins, viruses, prions or parasites.
Infectious
Infectious diseases, also known as transmissible diseases or communicable diseases, comprise clinically evident illness (i.e., characteristic medical signs or symptoms of disease) resulting from the infection, presence and growth of pathogenic biological agents in an individual host organism. Included in this category are contagious diseases – an infection, such as influenza or the common cold, that commonly spreads from one person to another – and communicable diseases – a disease that can spread from one person to another, but does not necessarily spread through everyday contact.
Lifestyle
A lifestyle disease is any disease that appears to increase in frequency as countries become more industrialized and people live longer, especially if the risk factors include behavioral choices like a sedentary lifestyle or a diet high in unhealthful foods such as refined carbohydrates, trans fats, or alcoholic beverages.
Non-communicable
A non-communicable disease is a medical condition or disease that is non-transmissible. Non-communicable diseases cannot be spread directly from one person to another. Heart disease and cancer are examples of non-communicable diseases in humans.

== Prevention ==
Many diseases and disorders can be prevented through a variety of means. These include sanitation, proper nutrition, adequate exercise, vaccinations and other self-care and public health measures, such as the use of cloth face masks.

== Treatments ==
Medical therapies or treatments are efforts to cure or improve a disease or other health problems. In the medical field, therapy is synonymous with the word treatment. Among psychologists, the term may refer specifically to psychotherapy or "talk therapy". Common treatments include medications, surgery, medical devices, and self-care. Treatments may be provided by an organized health care system, or informally, by the patient or family members.

Preventive healthcare is a way to avoid an injury, sickness, or disease in the first place. A treatment or cure is applied after a medical problem has already started. A treatment attempts to improve or remove a problem, but treatments may not produce permanent cures, especially in chronic diseases. Cures are a subset of treatments that reverse diseases completely or end medical problems permanently. Many diseases that cannot be completely cured are still treatable. Pain management (also called pain medicine) is that branch of medicine employing an interdisciplinary approach to the relief of pain and improvement in the quality of life of those living with pain.

Treatment for medical emergencies must be provided promptly, often through an emergency department or, in less critical situations, through an urgent care facility.

== Epidemiology ==
Epidemiology is the study of the factors that cause or encourage diseases. Some diseases are more common in certain geographic areas, among people with certain genetic or socioeconomic characteristics, or at different times of the year.

Epidemiology is considered a cornerstone methodology of public health research and is highly regarded in evidence-based medicine for identifying risk factors for diseases. In the study of communicable and non-communicable diseases, the work of epidemiologists ranges from outbreak investigation to study design, data collection, and analysis including the development of statistical models to test hypotheses and the documentation of results for submission to peer-reviewed journals. Epidemiologists also study the interaction of diseases in a population, a condition known as a syndemic. Epidemiologists rely on a number of other scientific disciplines such as biology (to better understand disease processes), biostatistics (the current raw information available), Geographic Information Science (to store data and map disease patterns) and social science disciplines (to better understand proximate and distal risk factors). Epidemiology can help identify causes as well as guide prevention efforts.

In studying diseases, epidemiology faces the challenge of defining them. Especially for poorly understood diseases, different groups might use significantly different definitions. Without an agreed-on definition, different researchers may report different numbers of cases and characteristics of the disease.

Some morbidity databases are compiled with data supplied by state and territory health authorities, at national levels or larger scale (such as European Hospital Morbidity Database (HMDB)) which may contain hospital discharge data by detailed diagnosis, age and sex. The European HMDB data was submitted by European countries to the World Health Organization Regional Office for Europe.

=== Burdens of disease ===
Disease burden is the impact of a health problem in an area measured by financial cost, mortality, morbidity, or other indicators.

There are several measures used to quantify the burden imposed by diseases on people. The years of potential life lost (YPLL) is a simple estimate of the number of years that a person's life was shortened due to a disease. For example, if a person dies at the age of 65 from a disease, and would probably have lived until age 80 without that disease, then that disease has caused a loss of 15 years of potential life. YPLL measurements do not account for how disabled a person is before dying, so the measurement treats a person who dies suddenly and a person who died at the same age after decades of illness as equivalent. In 2004, the World Health Organization calculated that 932 million years of potential life were lost to premature death.

The quality-adjusted life year (QALY) and disability-adjusted life year (DALY) metrics are similar but take into account whether the person was healthy after diagnosis. In addition to the number of years lost due to premature death, these measurements add part of the years lost to being sick. Unlike YPLL, these measurements show the burden imposed on people who are very sick, but who live a normal lifespan. A disease that has high morbidity, but low mortality, has a high DALY and a low YPLL. In 2004, the World Health Organization calculated that 1.5 billion disability-adjusted life years were lost to disease and injury. In the developed world, heart disease and stroke cause the most loss of life, but neuropsychiatric conditions like major depressive disorder cause the most years lost to being sick.

Disease category	Percent of all YPLLs lost, worldwide	Percent of all DALYs lost, worldwide	Percent of all YPLLs lost, Europe	Percent of all DALYs lost, Europe	Percent of all YPLLs lost, US and Canada	Percent of all DALYs lost, US and Canada
Infectious and parasitic diseases, especially lower respiratory tract infections, diarrhea, AIDS, tuberculosis, and malaria	37%	26%	9%	6%	5%	3%
Neuropsychiatric conditions, e.g. depression	2%	13%	3%	19%	5%	28%
Injuries, especially motor vehicle accidents	14%	12%	18%	13%	18%	10%
Cardiovascular diseases, principally heart attacks and stroke	14%	10%	35%	23%	26%	14%
Premature birth and other perinatal deaths	11%	8%	4%	2%	3%	2%
Cancer	8%	5%	19%	11%	25%	13%

== Society and culture ==
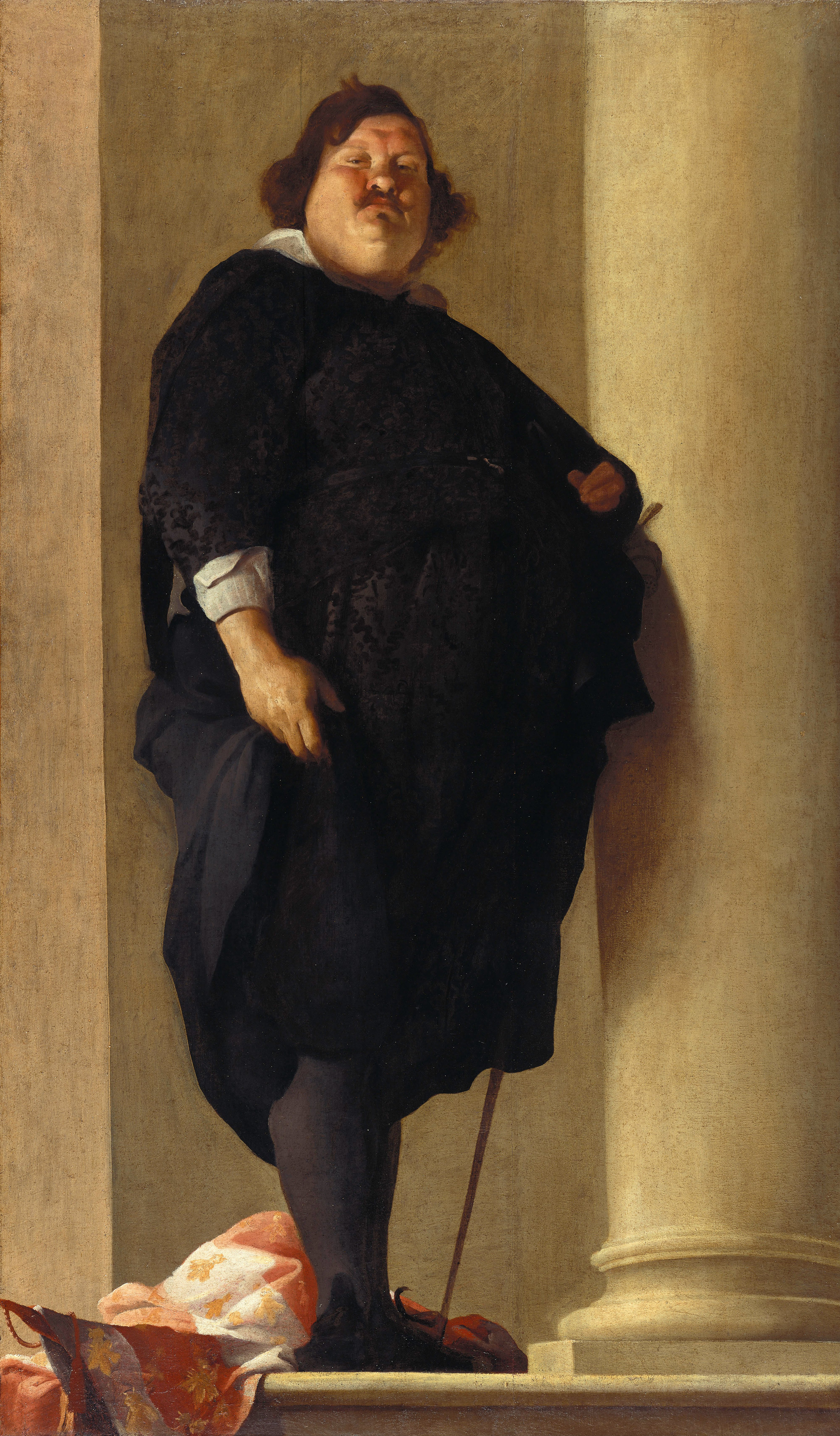
Obesity was a status symbol in Renaissance culture: "The Tuscan General Alessandro del Borro", attributed to Andrea Sacchi, 1645. It is now generally regarded as a disease.

How a society responds to diseases is the subject of medical sociology.

A condition may be considered a disease in some cultures or eras but not in others. For example, obesity was associated with prosperity and abundance, and this perception persists in many African regions, especially since the beginning of the HIV/AIDS. Epilepsy is considered a sign of spiritual gifts among the Hmong people.

Sickness confers the social legitimization of certain benefits, such as illness benefits, work avoidance, and being looked after by others. The person who is sick takes on a social role called the sick role. A person who responds to a dreaded disease, such as cancer, in a culturally acceptable fashion may be publicly and privately honored with higher social status. In return for these benefits, the sick person is obligated to seek treatment and work to become well once more. As a comparison, consider pregnancy, which is not interpreted as a disease or sickness, even if the mother and baby may both benefit from medical care.

Most religions grant exceptions from religious duties to people who are sick. For example, one whose life would be endangered by fasting on Yom Kippur or during the month of Ramadan is exempted from the requirement, or even forbidden from participating. People who are sick are also exempted from social duties. For example, ill health is the only socially acceptable reason for an American to refuse an invitation to the White House.

The identification of a condition as a disease, rather than as simply a variation of human structure or function, can have significant social or economic implications. The controversial recognition of diseases such as repetitive stress injury (RSI) and post-traumatic stress disorder (PTSD) has had a number of positive and negative effects on the financial and other responsibilities of governments, corporations, and institutions towards individuals, as well as on the individuals themselves. The social implication of viewing aging as a disease could be profound, though this classification is not yet widespread.

Lepers were people who were historically shunned because they had an infectious disease, and the term "leper" still evokes social stigma. Fear of disease can still be a widespread social phenomenon, though not all diseases evoke extreme social stigma.

Social standing and economic status affect health. Diseases of poverty are diseases that are associated with poverty and low social status; diseases of affluence are diseases that are associated with high social and economic status. Which diseases are associated with which states vary according to time, place, and technology. Some diseases, such as diabetes mellitus, may be associated with both poverty (poor food choices) and affluence (long lifespans and sedentary lifestyles), through different mechanisms. The term lifestyle diseases describes diseases associated with longevity and that are more common among older people. For example, cancer is far more common in societies in which most members live until they reach the age of 80 than in societies in which most members die before they reach the age of 50.

=== Language of disease ===
An illness narrative is a way of organizing a medical experience into a coherent story that illustrates the sick individual's personal experience.

People use metaphors to make sense of their experiences with disease. The metaphors move disease from an objective thing that exists to an affective experience. The most popular metaphors draw on military concepts: Disease is an enemy that must be feared, fought, battled, and routed. The patient or the healthcare provider is a warrior, rather than a passive victim or bystander. The agents of communicable diseases are invaders; non-communicable diseases constitute internal insurrection or civil war. Because the threat is urgent, perhaps a matter of life and death, unthinkably radical, even oppressive, measures are society's and the patient's moral duty as they courageously mobilize to struggle against destruction. The "war on cancer" is an example of this metaphorical use of language. This language is empowering to some patients, but leaves others feeling like they are failures.

Another class of metaphors describes the experience of illness as a journey: The person travels to or from a place of disease, and changes himself, discovers new information, or increases his experience along the way. He may travel "on the road to recovery" or make changes to "get on the right track" or choose "pathways". Some are explicitly immigration-themed: the patient has been exiled from the home territory of health to the land of the ill, changing identity and relationships in the process. This language is more common among British healthcare professionals than the language of physical aggression.

Some metaphors are disease-specific. Slavery is a common metaphor for addictions: The alcoholic is enslaved by drink, and the smoker is captive to nicotine. Some cancer patients treat the loss of their hair from chemotherapy as a metonymy or metaphor for all the losses caused by the disease.

Some diseases are used as metaphors for social ills: "Cancer" is a common description for anything that is endemic and destructive in society, such as poverty, injustice, or racism. AIDS was seen as a divine judgment for moral decadence, and only by purging itself from the "pollution" of the "invader" could society become healthy again. More recently, when AIDS seemed less threatening, this type of emotive language was applied to avian flu and type 2 diabetes mellitus. Authors in the 19th century commonly used tuberculosis as a symbol and a metaphor for transcendence. People with the disease were portrayed in literature as having risen above daily life to become ephemeral objects of spiritual or artistic achievement. In the 20th century, after its cause was better understood, the same disease became the emblem of poverty, squalor, and other social problems.

== See also ==
- Idiopathic disease, a disease whose cause is currently unknown
- Developmental disability, severe, lifelong disabilities attributable to mental or physical impairments
- Environmental disease
- Host–pathogen interaction
- Lists of diseases
- Mitochondrial disease
- Philosophy of medicine
- Plant pathology
- Rare disease, a disease that affects very few people
- Sociology of health and illness
- Syndrome
