= Nightingale's environmental theory =

Nursing theory

Florence Nightingale (1820–1910), considered the founder of educated and scientific nursing and widely known as "The Lady with the Lamp". wrote the first nursing notes that became the basis of nursing practice and research. The notes, entitled Notes on Nursing: What it is, and What it is Not (1860), listed some of her theories that have served as foundations of nursing practice in various settings, including the succeeding conceptual frameworks and theories in the field of nursing. Nightingale is considered the first nursing theorist. One of her theories was the Environmental Theory, which incorporated the restoration of the usual health status of the nurse's clients into the delivery of health care—it is still practiced today.

== Environmental effects ==
She stated in her nursing notes that nursing "is an act of utilizing the environment of the patient to assist him in his recovery" (Nightingale 1860/1969), that it involves the nurse's initiative to configure environmental settings appropriate for the gradual restoration of the patient's health, and that external factors associated with the patient's surroundings affect life or biologic and physiologic processes, and his development.

== Environmental factors affecting health ==
- Pure fresh air- "to keep the air he breathes as pure as the external air without chilling him/her."
- Pure water- "well water of a very impure kind is used for domestic purposes. And when epidemic disease shows itself, persons using such water are almost sure to suffer."
- Effective drainage- "all the while the sewer maybe nothing but a laboratory from which epidemic disease and ill health is being installed into the house."
- Cleanliness- "the greater part of nursing consists in preserving cleanliness."
- Light (especially direct sunlight)- "the usefulness of light in treating disease is very important."

Any deficiency in one or more of these factors could lead to impaired functioning of life processes or diminished health status.

== Provision of care by environment ==
The factors posed great significance during Nightingale's time, when health institutions had poor sanitation, and health workers had little education and training and were frequently incompetent and unreliable in attending to the needs of the patients. Also emphasized in her environmental theory is the provision of a quiet or noise-free and warm environment, attending to patient's dietary needs by assessment, documentation of time of food intake, and evaluating its effects on the patient.

Nightingale's theory was shown to be applicable during the Crimean War when she, along with other nurses she had trained, took care of injured soldiers by attending to their immediate needs, when communicable diseases and rapid spread of infections were rampant in this early period in the development of disease-capable medicines. The practice of environment configuration according to patient's health or disease condition is still applied today, in such cases as patients infected with Clostridium tetani (suffering from tetanus), who need minimal noise to calm them and a quiet environment to prevent seizure-causing stimulus.

== See also ==
- Crimean War Memorial
- Florence Nightingale
- Nursing
- Nursing process
- Nursing theory
