= Maldevelopment =

Maldevelopment is the state of an organism or an organisation that did not develop in the "normal" way (used in medicine, e.g. "brain maldevelopment of a fetus"). It was introduced as a human and social development term in France in the 1990s by Samir Amin to challenge the concept of "underdevelopment." The word maldéveloppement did not exist before then (the medical terms are malformation or développement anormal), so the word is a neologism meant to be analogous to the difference between undernutrition and malnutrition.

Maldevelopment is a global concept that includes human and social development. Under the philosophy of sustainable development, economic development is only a "tool" that allows for greater human and social development, not the final goal. Under-development is a quantitative notion, implying that a nation has a lack and must gain something to reach a particular reference state—the state of the nation that judges another nation as underdeveloped. So this notion also implies a unique development model—the one of the judging nation.

Mal-development, or ill-development, is a qualitative notion that expresses a mismatch, a discrepancy between the conditions (economic, political, meteorological, cultural, etc.) and the needs and means of the people.

== See also ==
- Human development theory
