= List of pollution-related diseases =

Diseases caused by pollution lead to the chronic illness and premature deaths of approximately 9 million people each year, corresponding to one in six deaths worldwide, according to a 2022 update to the Lancet Commission on Pollution and Health. This is in part because pollution causes so many diseases that it is often difficult to draw a straight line between cause and effect.

There are many types of pollution-related diseases, including those caused by air pollution, contaminated soil, water pollution and lacking water, sanitation and hygiene (WASH). Air pollution can be reduced.

== Environmental diseases vs. pollution-related diseases ==
Environmental diseases are a direct result from the environment. This includes diseases caused by substance abuse, exposure to toxic chemicals, and physical factors in the environment, like UV radiation from the sun, as well as genetic predisposition. Meanwhile, pollution-related diseases are attributed to exposure to toxins in the air, water, and soil. Therefore, all pollution-related disease are environmental diseases, but not all environmental diseases are pollution-related diseases.

== Air pollution diseases ==
According to the World Health Organization (WHO), air pollution is linked to 7 million premature deaths (1 in 8 of total global deaths) in 2012. More recent analysis by the Health Effects Institute and the Institute for Health Metrics and Evaluation, published in the ''State of Global Air 2025'' report, found that air pollution remained the leading environmental risk factor for death globally, contributing to 7.9 million deaths in 2023, with noncommunicable diseases accounting for 86% of those deaths. Here is a breakdown by the diseases air pollution causes:

=== Outdoor air pollution ===
- 40% – ischaemic heart disease
- 40% – stroke
- 11% – chronic obstructive pulmonary disease
- 6% - lung cancer
- 3% – acute lower respiratory infections in children

=== Indoor air pollution ===
- 34% – stroke
- 26% – ischaemic heart disease
- 22% – COPD
- 12% – acute lower respiratory infections in children
- 6% – lung cancer

== Water pollution ==
According to the Centers for Disease Control and Prevention (CDC): "Waterborne diseases are caused by pathogenic microbes that can be directly spread through contaminated water. Most waterborne diseases cause diarrheal illness [Note: not all diseases listed below cause diarrhea]. Eighty-eight percent of diarrhea cases worldwide are linked to unsafe drinking water, inadequate sanitation or insufficient hygiene. These cases result in 1.5 million deaths each year, mostly in young children. The usual cause of death is dehydration. Most cases of diarrheal illness and death occur in developing countries because of unsafe water, poor sanitation, and insufficient hygiene. Other waterborne diseases do not cause diarrhea; instead these diseases can cause malnutrition, skin infections, and organ damage.

=== Waterborne diseases ===
- Amoebiasis
- Buruli ulcer
- Campylobacter
- Cholera
- Cryptosporidiosis
- Cyclosporiasis
- Dracunculiasis (guinea-worm disease)
- Escherichia coli
- Fascioliasis
- Giardiasis
- Hepatitis
- Leptospirosis
- Norovirus
- Rotavirus
- Salmonella
- Schistosomiasis
- Shigellosis
- Typhoid fever

=== Diseases related to lack of sanitation and hygiene ===
- Dermatophytosis (ringworm)
- Lymphatic filariasis
- Scabies
- Soil transmitted helminthiasis
- Trachoma

=== Vector-borne diseases ===
- Arboviral encephalitis
- Dengue fever
- Malaria
- Onchocerciasis
- Rift Valley fever
- Yellow fever

== Toxins ==
=== Lead ===
Sources of lead poisoning/pollution include paint (e.g. lead paint deterioration), petroleum products, mining, smelting, manufacturing and recycling activities (e.g. battery recycling).

- Cardiovascular disease
- Cerebrovascular disease
- Chronic Kidney disease
- Hemorrhagic stroke
- Hypertensive heart disorder
- Ischemic heart disease
- Ischemic stroke
- Neurological impairment

According to the World Health Organization, lead exposure is linked to approximately 1.5 million deaths annually, primarily from cardiovascular disease.

=== Arsenic ===
Arsenic is a naturally occurring element and can be found in food, water, or air. There are also industrial sources of arsenic, including mining and smelting. "People are exposed to elevated levels of inorganic arsenic through drinking contaminated water, using contaminated water in food preparation and irrigation of food crops, industrial processes, eating contaminated food and smoking tobacco. Long-term exposure to inorganic arsenic... can lead to chronic arsenic poisoning. Skin lesions and skin cancer are the most characteristic effects."

- Arsenicosis
- Cancers (lung, bladder, and skin)
- Cardiovascular disease
- Chronic kidney disease
- Neurobehavioral impairment

=== Mercury ===
Mercury is a naturally occurring element found in air, water, and soil. According to the World Health Organization, even small amounts of mercury exposure may cause serious health problems; mercury is considered by WHO to be one of the top ten chemicals of major public health concern. It may have toxic effects on the nervous, digestive, and immune systems, and on the lungs, kidneys, skin, and eyes. People are mainly exposed to methylmercury, an organic compound, when they consume fish and shellfish that contain it.

- Acrodynia
- Arthritis
- Cerebellar ataxia
- Dysarthria
- Kidney and autoimmune dysfunction
- Minamata disease
- Neurological damage
- Respiratory failure

== See also ==
- Brain health and pollution
