= Diseases of affluence =

Health conditions thought to be a result of increasing wealth in society

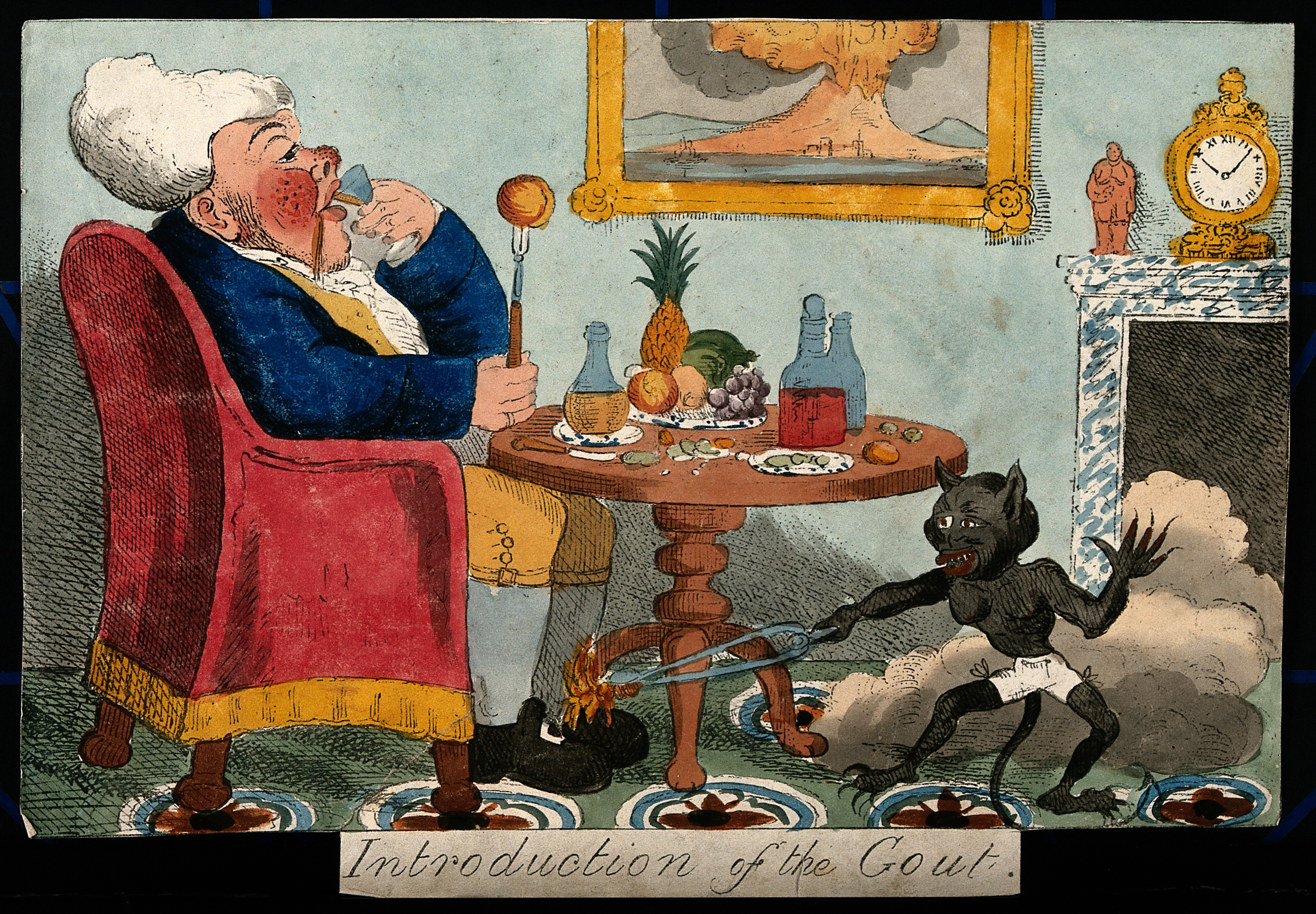
Satirical lithograph of 1818 depicting a self-indulgent and wealthy man afflicted with gout (represented by a demon); the disease is commonly caused by consumption of sugar, alcoholic beverages and meat; lack of physical activity; and obesity. It was formerly common among the upper classes of Western society.

Diseases of affluence, previously called diseases of rich people, is a term sometimes given to selected diseases and other health conditions which are commonly thought to be a result of increasing wealth in a society. Also referred to as the "Western disease" paradigm, these diseases are in contrast to "diseases of poverty", which largely result from and contribute to human impoverishment. These diseases of affluence have vastly increased in prevalence since the end of World War II.

Examples of diseases of affluence include mostly chronic non-communicable diseases (NCDs) and other physical health conditions for which personal lifestyles and societal conditions associated with economic development are believed to be an important risk factor—such as type 2 diabetes, asthma, coronary heart disease, cerebrovascular disease, peripheral vascular disease, obesity, hypertension, cancer, alcoholism, gout, and some types of allergy. They may also be considered to include depression and other mental health conditions associated with increased social isolation and lower levels of psychological well-being observed in many developed countries. Many of these conditions are interrelated, for example obesity is thought to be a partial cause of many other illnesses.

In contrast, the diseases of poverty have tended to be largely infectious diseases, or the result of poor living conditions. These include tuberculosis, malaria, and intestinal diseases. Increasingly, research is finding that diseases thought to be diseases of affluence also appear in large part in the poor. These diseases include obesity and cardiovascular disease and, coupled with infectious diseases, these further increase global health inequalities.

Diseases of affluence started to become more prevalent in developing countries as diseases of poverty decline, longevity increases, and lifestyles change. In 2008, nearly 80% of deaths due to NCDs—including heart disease, strokes, chronic lung diseases, cancers and diabetes—occurred in low- and middle-income countries; it has since decreased to 73% in 2021.

== Main instances ==
According to the World Health Organization (WHO), the top 10 causes of deaths in 2021 were from:

1. Ischemic heart diseases
2. COVID-19
3. Stroke
4. Chronic obstructive pulmonary disease
5. Lower respiratory infections
6. Trachea, bronchus, lung cancers
7. Alzheimer's disease and other dementias
8. Diabetes mellitus
9. Kidney diseases
10. Tuberculosis

Seven of the main causes of death are non-communicable diseases. In 2021, WHO reported 68 million deaths worldwide, with more than half (57%) attributed to the top causes previously mentioned.

== Causes ==
Factors associated with the increase of these conditions and illnesses appear to be things that are a direct result of technological advances. They include:

- Less strenuous physical exercise, often through increased use of motor vehicles
- Irregular exercise as a result of office jobs involving no physical labor.
- Easy accessibility in society to large amounts of low-cost food (relative to the much-lower caloric food availability in a subsistence economy)
  - More food generally, with much less physical exertion expended to obtain a moderate amount of food
  - Higher consumption of vegetable oils and high sugar-containing foods
  - Higher consumption of meat and dairy products
  - Higher consumption of refined grains and products made of such, like white bread and white rice.
    - A notable historical example is that of Beriberi, a thiamin deficiency syndrome which was long known as a disease of the wealthy in east Asia: Brown rice and other cereal grains are a good source of thiamin, while white rice is not. Because of the labor and waste involved, white rice was long seen as a luxury, meaning a thiamin-deficient diet was something only the rich could afford. Eventually, however, the development of motorized rice-polishing equipment brought luxury—and disease—to the masses.
  - More foods which are processed, cooked, and commercially provided (rather than seasonal, fresh foods prepared locally at the time of eating)
- Prolonged periods of little activity
- Greater use of alcohol and tobacco
- Longer lifespans
  - Reduced exposure to infectious agents throughout life (this can result in a more idle and inexperienced immune system, as compared to an individual who experienced relatively frequent exposure to certain pathogens in their time of life)
- Increased cleanliness. The hygiene hypothesis postulates that children of affluent families are now exposed to fewer antigens than has been normal in the past, giving rise to increased prevalence of allergy and autoimmune diseases.

== Diabetes mellitus ==
Diabetes is a chronic metabolic disease characterized by increase blood glucose level. Type 2 diabetes is the most common form of diabetes. It is caused by resistance to insulin or the lack of production of insulin. It is seen most commonly in adults. Type 1 diabetes or juvenile diabetes is diagnosed mostly in children. This condition is due to little or lack of insulin production from the pancreas.

According to WHO the prevalence of diabetes has quadrupled from 1980 to 422 million adults. The global prevalence of diabetes has increased from 4.7% in 1980 to 8.5% in 2014. Diabetes has been a major cause for blindness, kidney failure, heart attack, stroke and lower limb amputation.

=== Prevalence in countries of affluence ===
The Centers of Disease Control and Prevention (CDC) released a report in 2015 indicating that more than 100 million Americans have diabetes or pre-diabetes. Diabetes was the seventh leading cause of death in the United States in 2015. In developed countries like the United States, the risk for diabetes is seen in people with low socioeconomic status (SES). Socioeconomic status is defined by the education and the income level of a person. The prevalence of diabetes varies by education level. Of those diagnosed with diabetes:12.6% of adults had less than a high school education, 9.5% had a high school education and 7.2% had more than high school education.

Differences in diabetes prevalence are seen in the population and ethnic groups in the US. Diabetes is more common in non-Hispanic whites who are less educated and have a lower income. It is also more common in less educated Hispanics. The highest prevalence of diabetes is seen in the southeast, southern and Appalachian portion of the United States. In the United States the prevalence of diabetes is increasing in children and adolescents. In 2015, 25 million people were diagnosed with diabetes, of which 193,000 were children. The total direct and indirect cost of diagnosed diabetes in US in 2012 was $245 billion.

In 2009, the Canadian Diabetes Association (CDA) estimated that diagnosed diabetes will increase from 1.3 million in 2000 to 2.5 million in 2010 and 3.7 million in 2020. Diabetes was the 7th leading cause of death in Canada in 2015. Like United States, diabetes in more prevalent in the low socioeconomic group of people in Canada.

According to the International Diabetes Federation, more than 58 million people are diagnosed with diabetes in the European Union Region (EUR), and this will go up to 66.7 million by 2045. Similar to other affluent countries like America and Canada, diabetes is more prevalent in the poorer parts of Europe like Central and Eastern Europe.

In Australia according to self-reported data, 1 in 7 adults or approximately 1.2 million people had diabetes in 2014–2015. People who were living in remote or socioeconomically disadvantaged areas were 4 times more likely to develop type 2 diabetes as compared to non-indigenous Australians. Australia incurred $20.8 million in direct costs towards hospitalization, medication, and out-patient treatment towards diabetes. In 2015, $1.2 billion were lost in Australia's Gross Domestic Product (GDP) due to diabetes.

In these countries of affluence, diabetes is prevalent in low socioeconomic groups of people as there is abundance of unhealthy food choices, high energy rich food, and decreased physical activity. More affluent people are typically more educated and have tools to counter unhealthy foods, such as access to healthy food, physical trainers, and parks and fitness centers.

=== Risk factors ===
Obesity and being overweight is one of the main risk factors of type 2 diabetes. Other risk factors include lack of physical activity, genetic predisposition, being over 45 years old, tobacco use, high blood pressure and high cholesterol. In the United States, the prevalence of obesity was 39.8% in adults and 18.5% in children and adolescents in 2015–2016. In Australia in 2014–2015, 2 out 3 adults or 63% were overweight or obese. Also, 2 out of 3 adults did little or no exercise. According to the World Health Organization, Europe had the 2nd highest proportion of overweight or obese people in 2014 behind the Americas.

=== In developing countries ===
According to the World Health Organization, the prevalence of diabetes is rising more in middle- and low-income countries. Over the next 25 years, the number of people with diabetes in developing countries will increase by over 150%. Diabetes is typically seen in people above the retirement age in developed countries, but in developing countries, it mostly affects people between the ages of 35 and 64. Although,diabetes is considered a disease of affluence affecting the developed countries, there are more deaths and premature deaths among people with diabetes in developing countries. Asia accounts for 60% of the world's diabetic population. In 1980, less than 1% of Chinese adults were affected by diabetes, but by 2008, the prevalence was 10%. It is predicted that by 2030, diabetes may affect 79.4 million people in India, 42.3 million people in China, and 30.3 million in the United States.

These changes are the result of developing nations having rapid economic development, which has caused changes in lifestyle and food habits that lead to over-nutrition, increased intake of fast food causing increase in weight, and insulin resistance. Compared to the Western world, obesity in Asia is low. India has very low prevalence of obesity, but a very high prevalence of diabetes, suggesting that diabetes may occur at a lower BMI in Indians as compared to Europeans. Smoking increases the risk for diabetes by 45%. In developing countries, around 50–60% adult males are regular smokers, increasing their risk for diabetes. In developing countries, diabetes is more commonly seen in more urbanized areas. The prevalence of diabetes in the rural population is 1/4th that of the urban population for countries like India, Bangladesh, Nepal, Bhutan and Sri Lanka.

== Cardiovascular disease ==
Cardiovascular disease refers to a disease of the heart and blood vessels. Conditions and diseases associated with heart disease include: stroke, coronary heart disease, congenital heart disease, heart failure, peripheral vascular disease, and cardiomyopathy. Cardiovascular disease is known as the world's biggest killer. 17.5 million people die from it each year, which equals 31% of all deaths. Heart disease and stroke cause 80% of these deaths.

=== Risk factors ===
High blood pressure is the leading risk factor for cardiovascular disease and has contributed to 12% of the cardiovascular related deaths worldwide. Other significant risk factors for heart disease include high cholesterol and smoking. 47% of all Americans have one of these three risk factors. Lifestyle choices, such as poor diet and physical inactivity, and excessive alcohol use can also contribute to cardiovascular disease. Medical conditions, like diabetes and obesity can also be risk factors.

=== Prevalence in countries of affluence ===
In the United States, 610,000 people die every year from heart disease which is equal to 1 in 4 deaths. The leading cause of death for both men and women in the United States is heart disease. In Canada, heart disease is the second leading cause of death. In 2014, it was the cause of death for 51,000 people. In Australia, heart disease is also the leading cause of death. 29% of deaths in 2015, had an underlying cause of heart disease. Heart disease causes one in four premature deaths in the United Kingdom and in 2015 heart disease caused 26% of all deaths in that country.

People of lower socio-economic status are more likely to have cardiovascular disease than those who have a higher socio-economic status. This inequality gap has occurred in developed countries because people who have a lower socio-economic status often face many of the risk factors of tobacco and alcohol use, obesity as well as having a sedentary lifestyle. Further social and environmental factors such as poverty, pollution, family history, housing and employment contribute to this inequality gap and to risk of having a health condition caused by cardiovascular disease. The increasing inequality gap between the higher and lower income populations continues in countries such as Canada, despite the availability of health care for everyone.

== Alzheimer's disease and other dementias ==
Dementia is a chronic syndrome which is characterized by deterioration in the thought process beyond what is expected from normal aging. It affects the person's memory, thinking, orientation, comprehension, behavior and ability to perform everyday activity. There are many different forms of dementia. Alzheimer's disease is the most common form which contributes to 60–70% of the dementia cases. Different forms of dementia can co-exist. Young onset dementia which occurs in individuals before the age of 65 contributes to 9% of the total cases. It is the major cause of disability and dependency among old people.

There are 50 million people with dementia worldwide, and 10 million new cases are being reported every year. The total number of people with dementia is projected to reach 82 million by 2030 and 152 million in 2050.

=== Prevalence in countries of affluence ===
According to the CDC, Alzheimer's is the 6th leading cause of death in U.S. adults and the 5th leading cause of death in adults over the age of 65. In 2014, 5 million Americans above the age of 65 were diagnosed with Alzheimer's. This number is predicted to triple by the year 2060 and reach up to 14 million. Dementia and Alzheimer's have been shown to go unreported on death certificates, leading to underrepresentation of actual deaths caused by these diseases. Between 2000 and 2015, deaths due to cardiovascular diseases have decreased by 11%, whereas deaths from Alzheimer's have increased by 123%. 1 in 3 people over the age of 65 die from Alzheimer's or other forms of dementia. Furthermore, 200,000 individuals have been affected by early-onset dementia. In the United States, Alzheimer's affects more women than men. It is twice more common in African-Americans and Hispanics than in whites. As the number of older Americans increases rapidly, the number of new cases of Alzheimer's will rise too.

East Asia has the most people living with dementia (9.8 million) followed by Western Europe (7.5 million), South Asia (5.1 million) and North America (4.8 million). In 2016, the prevalence of Alzheimer's was 5.05% in Europe. Like in the United States, it is more prevalent in women than in men. In the European Union, Finland has the highest mortality among both men and women due to dementia. In Canada, over half a million people are living with dementia. It is projected that, by 2031, the number will go up by 66% to 937,000. Every year, 25,000 new cases of dementia are diagnosed.

Dementia is the second leading cause of death in Australia. In 2016, it was the leading cause of death in females. In Australia 436,366 people are living with dementia in 2018. 3 in 10 people over the age of 85 and 1 in 10 people over the age of 65 have dementia. It is the single greatest cause of disability in older Australians. Rates of dementia are higher for indigenous people. In people from the Northern Territory and Western Australia, the prevalence of dementia is 26 times higher in the 45–69 year old group and about 20 times greater in the 60–69 year old group.

=== Risk factors in countries of affluence ===
The risk factors for developing dementia or Alzheimer's include age, family history, genetic factors, environmental factors, brain injury, viral infections, neurotoxic chemicals, and various immunological and hormonal disorders.

A new research study has found an association between the affluence of a country, hygiene conditions, and the prevalence of Alzheimer's amongst its population. According to the Hygiene Hypothesis, affluent countries with more urbanized and industrialized areas have better hygiene, better sanitation, clean water, and improved access to antibiotics. This reduces the exposure to the friendly bacteria, viruses, and other microorganisms that help stimulate the immune system. Decreased microbial exposure leads to poor immune system development, which exposes the brain to inflammation as is seen in Alzheimer's disease.

Countries like the UK and France that have access to clean drinking water, improved sanitation facilities, and have a high GDP show a 9% increase in Alzheimer's disease as opposed to countries like Kenya and Cambodia. Also, countries like the UK and Australia, where three quarters of the population live in urban areas, have a 10% higher Alzheimer's rate than in countries like Bangladesh and Nepal, where less than one tenth of the population lives in urban areas.

The risk of Alzheimer's disease changes with the environment. Individuals from the same ethnic background living in an area of low sanitation will have a lower risk as compared to the same individuals living in an area of high sanitation, who will be exposed to a higher risk of developing Alzheimer's. An African-American in U.S. has a higher risk of developing Alzheimer's as compared to one living in Nigeria. Evidence suggests immigrant populations exhibit Alzheimer's disease rates that fall between those of their home countries and adopted countries. Moving from a country of high sanitation to a country of low sanitation reduces the risk associated with the disease.

== Mental illness ==
People who face poverty have more risks related to having a mental illness and also do not have as much access to treatment. The stressful events that they face, unsafe living condition and poor physical health lead to cycle of poverty and mental illness that is seen all over the world. According to the World Health Organization 76–85% of people living in lower and middle income countries are not treated for their mental illness. For those in higher-income counties, 35–50% of people with mental illness do not receive treatment. It is estimated that 90% of deaths by suicide are caused by substance use disorders and mental illness in higher income countries. In lower to middle income countries, this number is lower.

=== Prevalence of mental illness ===
One in four people have experienced mental illness at one time in their lives, and approximately 450 million people in the world currently have a mental illness. Those who are impoverished live in conditions associated with a higher risk for mental illness and, to compound the issue, do not have as much access to treatment. Stress, unsafe living conditions, and poor physical health associated with lack of sufficient income lead to a cycle of poverty and mental illness that is observed worldwide. In the U.S., approximately one in five adults has a mental illness, or 44.7 million people. In 2016, it was estimated that 268 million people in the world had depression.

Anxiety disorders, such as generalized anxiety, Obsessive Compulsive Disorder, and Post Traumatic Stress Disorder affected 275 million people worldwide in 2016. The global proportion of people affected by anxiety disorders is between 2.5 and 6.5%. Australia, Brazil, Argentina, Iran, the United States, and a number of countries in Western Europe appear to have a higher prevalence of anxiety disorders.

== Cancer ==
Cancer is a generic term for a large group of diseases characterized by the rapid creation of abnormal cells that grow beyond their usual boundaries. These cells can invade adjoining parts of the body and spread to other organs, which is a major cause of death. According to the WHO, cancer is the second leading cause of death globally. One in six deaths worldwide are caused by cancer, accounting to a total of 9.6 million deaths in 2018. Tracheal, bronchus, and lung cancer are the leading forms of cancer deaths across most high and middle-income countries.

=== Prevalence in countries of affluence ===
In the United States, 1,735,350 new cases of cancer will be diagnosed in 2018. Most common forms of cancer are cancer of the breast, lung, bronchus, prostate, colorectal cancer, melanoma of skin, Non-Hodgkin's lymphoma, renal cancer, thyroid cancer and liver cancer. Cancer mortality is higher among men than women. African-Americans have the highest risk of cancer-related mortality. Cancer is also the leading cause of death in Australia. The most common cancers in Australia are prostate, breast, colorectal, melanoma, and lung cancer. These account for 60% of the cancer cases diagnosed in Australia.

Europe contains only 1/8 of the global population, but has around one quarter of the global cancer cases, with 3.7 million new cases each year. Lung, breast, stomach, liver, and colon are the most common cancers in Europe. The overall incidences among different cancers vary across countries.

About one in two Canadians will develop cancer in their lifetime, and one in four will die of the disease. In 2017, 206,200 new cases of cancer were diagnosed. Lung, colorectal, breast, and prostate cancer accounted for about half of all cancer diagnoses and deaths.

=== Risk factors ===
High prevalence of cancer in high-income countries is attributed to lifestyle factors like obesity, smoking, physical inactivity, diet and alcohol intake. Around 40% of the cancers can be prevented by modifying these factors.

== Allergies/autoimmune diseases ==
The rate of allergies around the world has risen in industrialized nations over the past 50 years. A number of public health measures, such as sterilized milk, use of antibiotics and improved food production have contributed to a decrease in infections in developed countries. There is a proposed causal relationship, known as the "hygiene hypothesis" that indicates that there are more autoimmune disorders and allergies in developed countries with fewer infections. In developing countries, it is assumed that the rates of allergies are lower than developed countries. That assumption may not be accurate due to limited data on prevalence. Research has found an increase in asthma by 10% in countries such as Peru, Costa Rica, and Brazil.

== See also ==
- Affluenza: "placing a high value on money, possessions, appearances (physical and social) and fame" may increase risk of mental illnesses
- Nutrition
- Social determinants of health
- The China Study: 2005 book on the relationship between the consumption of animal products and selected illnesses
- Urbanization
- Westernization
