= Lifestyle disease =

Diseases linked with the way people live their life

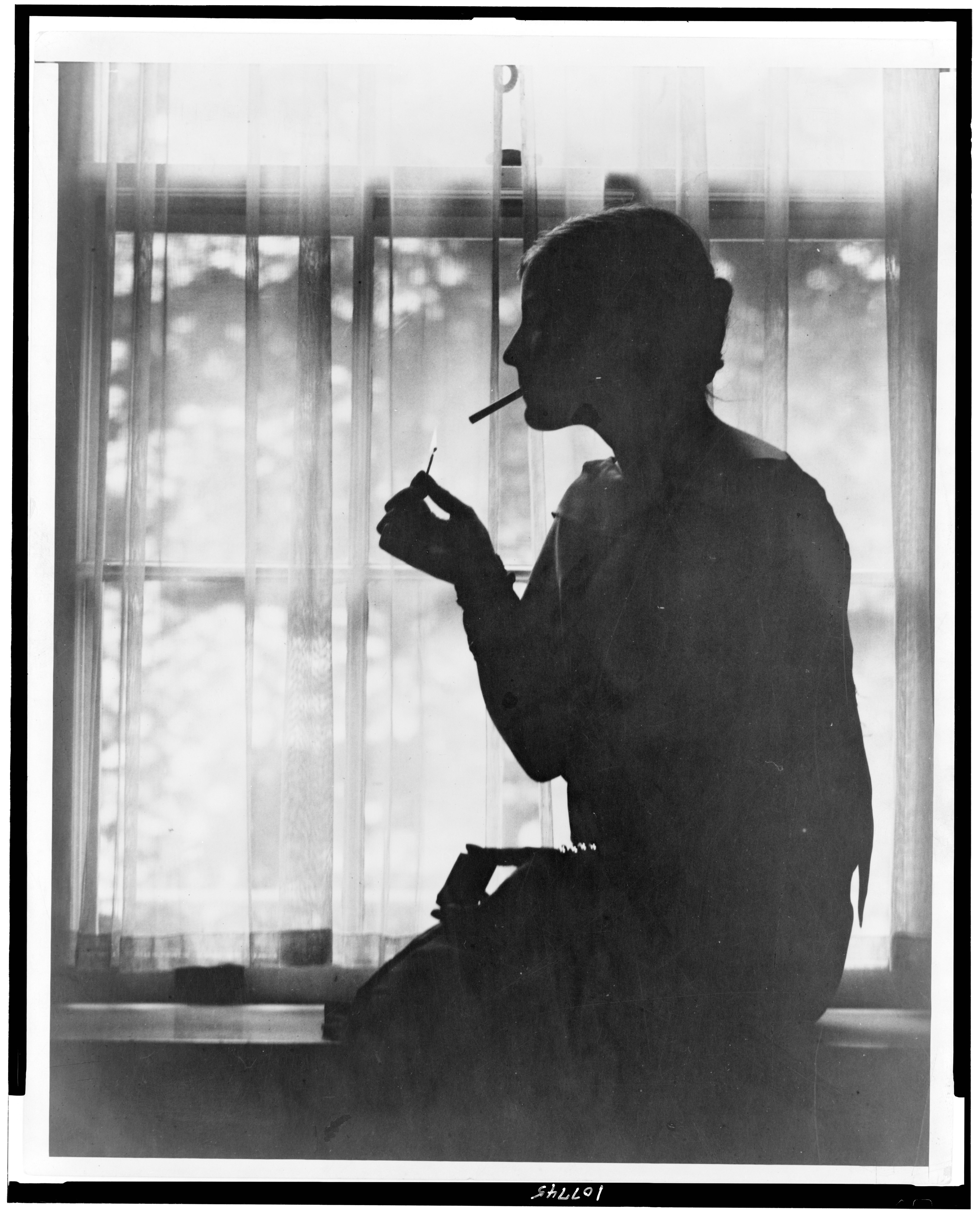
Tobacco smoking can lead to lung cancer, considered a lifestyle disease.

Lifestyle diseases can be defined as the diseases linked to the manner in which a person lives their life. These diseases are non-communicable, and can be caused by lack of physical activity, unhealthy eating, alcohol, substance use disorders and smoking tobacco, which can lead to heart disease, stroke, obesity, type II diabetes and lung cancer. The diseases that appear to increase in frequency as countries become more industrialized and people live longer include Alzheimer's disease, arthritis, atherosclerosis, asthma, cancer, chronic liver disease or cirrhosis, chronic obstructive pulmonary disease, colitis, irritable bowel syndrome, type 2 diabetes, heart disease, hypertension, metabolic syndrome, chronic kidney failure, osteoporosis, PCOD, stroke, depression, obesity and vascular dementia.

Concerns were raised in 2011 that lifestyle diseases could soon have an impact on the workforce and the cost of health care. Treating these non-communicable diseases can be expensive. It can be critical for the patient's health to receive primary prevention and identify early symptoms of these non-communicable diseases. These lifestyle diseases are expected to increase throughout the years if people do not improve their lifestyle choices.

Some commenters maintain a distinction between diseases of longevity and diseases of civilization or diseases of affluence. Certain diseases, such as diabetes, dental caries and asthma, appear at greater rates in young populations living in the "western" way; their increased incidence is not related to age, so the terms cannot accurately be used interchangeably for all diseases.

== Causes ==
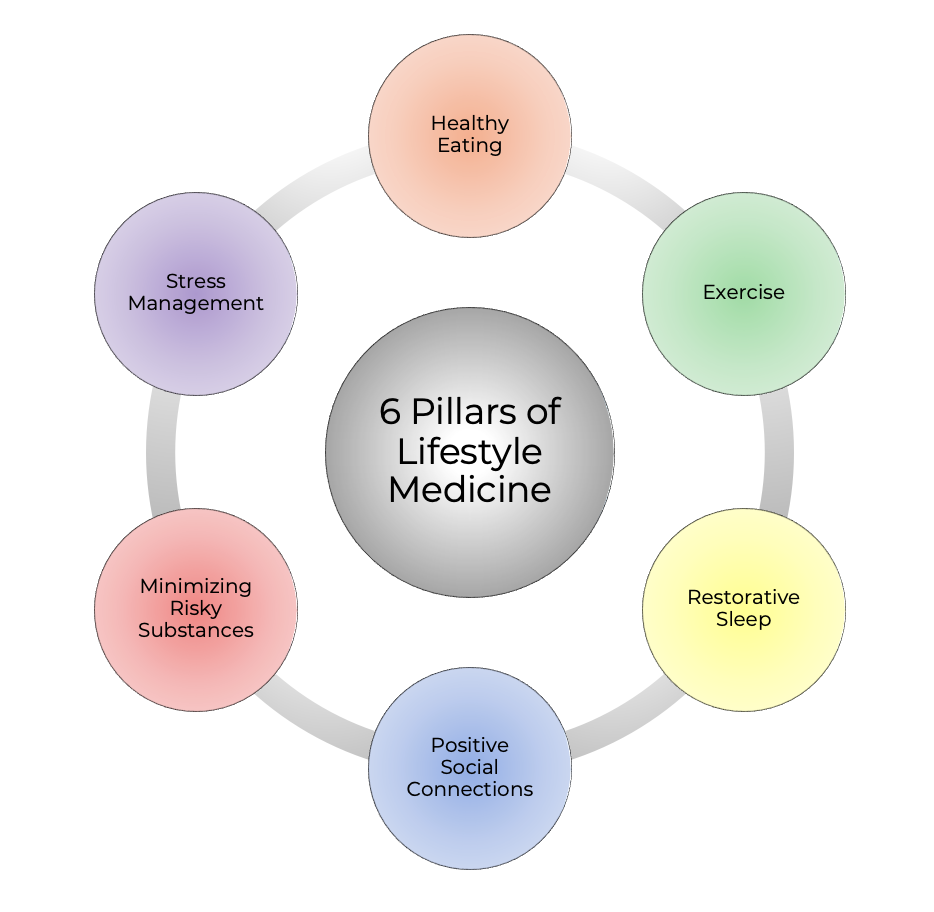
The 6 pillars of lifestyle medicine.

Diet and lifestyle are major factors thought to influence susceptibility to many diseases. Substance use disorders, such as tobacco smoking, excessive consumption of alcohol, and a lack of or too much exercise may also increase the risk of developing certain diseases, especially later in life.

In many Western countries, people began to consume more meat, dairy products, vegetable oils, tobacco, sugary foods, sugary beverages, and alcoholic beverages during the latter half of the 20th century. People also developed sedentary lifestyles and greater rates of obesity. Rates of colorectal, breast, prostate, endometrial and lung cancer started increasing after this dietary change. People in developing countries, whose diets still depend largely on low-sugar starchy foods with little meat or fat have lower rates of these cancers. Causes are not just from smoking tobacco and alcohol use; adults can develop lifestyle diseases through behavioral factors that impact them. Behavioral factors including unemployment, unsafe life, poor social environment, working conditions, stress and home life can increase their risk of developing one of these non-communicable diseases.

== Death statistics in Australia ==
Between 1995 and 2005, 813,000 Australians were hospitalized due to alcohol. In 2014, 11.2 million Australians were overweight or obese.

In 2013, there were 147,678 deaths within Australia mostly from lifestyle diseases. Smoking tobacco, alcohol use and other substances, violence, and unhealthy weight have impacted the Australians' death rate. The leading cause of death of Australian males was heart disease with 11,016 deaths, followed by lung cancer with 4,995 deaths, and chronic pulmonary disease killing 3,572. All these conditions were mainly attributed to smoking, excessive alcohol use or an unhealthy lifestyle. In 2013, coronary heart disease was the leading cause of death in 8,750 women, mainly as a result of their lifestyle. Dementia and Alzheimer's disease came second, affecting 7,277 females and thirdly, cerebrovascular disease, killing 6,368. These top three causes of deaths could be minimized through lifestyle changes within the Australian population.

The table shows the ages of people dying and the top five diseases for which they are dying.

Age	1st	2nd	3rd	4th	5th
45-64	Coronary heart disease	Lung cancer	Breast cancer	Colorectal cancer	Suicide
65-74	Coronary heart disease	Lung cancer	COPD	Cerebrovascular disease	Colorectal cancer
75-84	Coronary heart disease	Cerebrovascular disease	Dementia and Alzheimer's disease	Lung cancer	COPD
85-94	Coronary heart disease	Dementia and Alzheimer's disease	Cerebrovascular disease	COPD	Influenza and pneumonia

== Death statistics in the United States ==
In 1900, the top three causes of death in the United States were pneumonia/influenza, tuberculosis, and diarrhea/enteritis. Communicable diseases accounted for about 60 percent of all deaths. In 1900, heart disease and cancer were ranked number four and eight, respectively. Since the 1940s, the majority of deaths in the United States have resulted from heart disease, cancer, and other degenerative diseases. By the late 1990s, degenerative diseases accounted for more than 60 percent of all deaths.

Lifestyle diseases have their onset later in an individual's life; they appear to increase in frequency as countries become more industrialized and people live longer. This suggests that the life expectancy at birth of 49.24 years in 1900 was too short for degenerative diseases to occur, compared to a life expectancy at birth of 77.8 years in 2004. Also, survivorship to the age of 50 was 58.5% in 1900, and 93.7% in 2007.

== Death statistics in India ==
According to a report published by the Indian Council of Medical Research in 2017, 3 of the 5 leading individual causes of disease burden in India were non-communicable, with ischemic heart disease and chronic obstructive pulmonary disease as the top two causes and stroke as the fifth leading cause. The range of disease burden or DALY rate among the states in 2016 was 9-fold for ischemic heart disease, 4-fold for chronic obstructive pulmonary disease, 6-fold for stroke, and 4-fold for diabetes across India. Of the total deaths from major disease groups, 62% of all deaths were caused by non-communicable diseases.

Distribution of deaths from major disease groups, by age (2016)
Death rate per 1,000,000 [percent of total deaths in that age group]
Age group	Communicable, maternal, neonatal and nutritional diseases	Non-communicable diseases	Injuries
0–14 years	22.6 [80.8]	3.4 [12.0]	2.0 [7.2]
15–39 years	5.9 [29.1]	6.9 [34.4]	7.3 [36.5]
40–69 years	19.6 [17.4]	82.4 [73.2]	10.5 [9.4]
70+ years	186.7 [23.0]	580.5 [71.6]	43.5 [5.4]
All ages	20.5 [27.5]	46 [61.8]	8.0 [10.7]

== Prevention ==
Prevention of these non-communicable diseases involves remedies or activities that aim to reduce the likelihood of a disease or disorder affecting people. Lifestyle diseases are preventable for children if parents set them on the correct path, as early life decisions and influences can impact people later on in life. Lifestyle diseases can be prevented through reduction in smoking of tobacco. The Australian Government started by introducing plain packaging for all tobacco products and increasing the prices of tobacco production. Obesity can be prevented through a well-balanced lifestyle through healthy eating and exercise. 30 minutes of moderate exercise daily or 150 minutes of moderate intensity exercise a week can be the start of a new lifestyle change. Examples of moderate exercise include a brisk walk, swim, bicycle ride or it can also be everyday life activities like mowing the lawn or house cleaning. In addition, studies have suggested that early life exercise can reduce the risk of developing metabolic diseases in adulthood. All causes of lifestyle disease can be prevented through giving up smoking and other substances, reducing one's intake of alcohol, processed meats (like bacon and sausages), red meats (like pork, beef and lamb), fatty foods and by engaging in daily exercise. However, new studies also show preventive effects on recurrent respiratory tract infections in children through the intake of unprocessed food. Beef, green vegetables, and whole dairy can be beneficial because they are unprocessed compared to processed foods. Beef, unlike other types of red meat, can contribute to the health-promoting effects. Eating an excess amount of these foods can have an impact on one's health. Certain foods and activities such as smoking and drinking should be done in moderation.

== See also ==
- Affluenza
- Diseases of affluence
- Health
- Health care in Australia
- Healthcare in the United Kingdom
