= Journal of the American Academy of Child and Adolescent Psychiatry =

Peer-reviewed scientific journal

- Discipline: Pediatric psychiatry
- Language: English
- Edited by: Andrés Martin, James J. Hudziak

Publication details
- Former name: Journal of the American Academy of Child Psychiatry
- History: 1987-present
- Publisher: Elsevier on behalf of the American Academy of Child and Adolescent Psychiatry (United States)
- Frequency: Monthly
- Impact factor: 7.26 (2014)

Standard abbreviations
- ISO 4: J. Am. Acad. Child Adolesc. Psychiatry

Indexing
- CODEN: JAAPEE
- ISSN: 0890-8567 (print); 1527-5418 (web)
- LCCN: 87640752
- OCLC no.: 14404226

Links
- Journal homepage; Online access

The Journal of the American Academy of Child and Adolescent Psychiatry is a peer-reviewed medical journal covering pediatric psychiatry. It is published by Elsevier and is the official journal of the American Academy of Child and Adolescent Psychiatry. The editor-in-chief is Douglas Novins.

According to the Journal Citation Reports, its 2014 impact factor is 7.26, ranking it first among 119 journals in the category "Pediatrics". It is abstracted and indexed in MEDLINE/PubMed, and Science Citation Index.

== Call for retraction ==
The group Healthy Skepticism has accused the journal of having published an article, in 2001, that misrepresented the results of an industry-sponsored clinical trial, study 329. The study examined the use of paroxetine by teenagers. The trial was sponsored by, and ghostwritten on behalf of, SmithKline Beecham (now GlaxoSmithKline), and is widely regarded as having downplayed the trial's negative results. JAACAP editors have declined to retract the article, arguing that the negative results are available in the article, and that therefore there are no grounds for retraction. This claim is disputed on the basis that primary and secondary outcomes for efficacy were manipulated and safety results were obscured or omitted. Critics therefore argue that the Journal's editors have failed to uphold the scientific standards of clinical research by failing to retract a fraudulent article.
