= Study 329 =

Scientific article

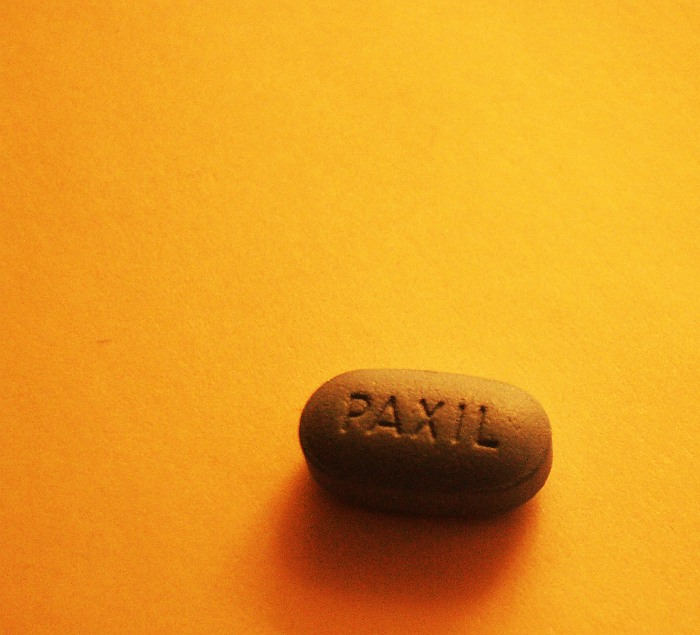
- Paroxetine, sold as Paxil and Seroxat
- Study type: Eight-week, placebo-controlled, double-blind, randomized clinical trial comparing paroxetine with imipramine in adolescents with major depressive disorder
- Dates: 1994–1998
- Locations: 10 centres in the United States, two in Canada
- Lead researcher: Martin Keller, then professor of psychiatry, Brown University
- Funding: SmithKline Beecham, now GlaxoSmithKline (GSK)
- Protocol: "Study drug: BRL29060/Paroxetine (Paxil)", SmithKline Beecham, 20 August 1993, amended 24 March 1994.
- Published: July 2001
- Disputed article: Martin B. Keller, et al. (July 2001). "Efficacy of paroxetine in the treatment of adolescent major depression: a randomized, controlled trial", Journal of the American Academy of Child and Adolescent Psychiatry, 40(7), pp. 762–772. PMID 11437014
- Call for retraction: May 2003, April 2013
- Retracted: No
- Legal penalty: GSK fined in 2012 by US Department of Justice
- Study reanalysis: Joanna Le Noury, et al. (16 September 2015). "Restoring Study 329: efficacy and harms of paroxetine and imipramine in treatment of major depression in adolescence", BMJ, 351, 16 September 2015. PMID 26376805

Study 329 was a clinical trial which was conducted in North America from 1994 to 1998 to study the efficacy of paroxetine, an SSRI anti-depressant, in treating 12- to 18-year-olds diagnosed with major depressive disorder. Led by Martin Keller, then professor of psychiatry at Brown University, and funded by the British pharmaceutical company SmithKline Beecham—known since 2000 as GlaxoSmithKline (GSK)—the study compared paroxetine with imipramine, a tricyclic antidepressant, and placebo (an inert pill). SmithKline Beecham had released paroxetine in 1991, marketing it as Paxil in North America and Seroxat in the UK. The drug attracted sales of $11.7 billion in the United States alone from 1997 to 2006, including $2.12 billion in 2002, the year before it lost its patent.

Published in July 2001 in the Journal of the American Academy of Child and Adolescent Psychiatry (JAACAP), which listed Keller and 21 other researchers as co-authors, study 329 became controversial when it was discovered that the article had been ghostwritten by a PR firm hired by SmithKline Beecham, had made false claims about the drug's efficacy, and had downplayed safety concerns. The controversy led to several lawsuits and strengthened calls for drug companies to disclose all their clinical research data. New Scientist wrote in 2015: "You may never have heard of it, but Study 329 changed medicine."

SmithKline Beecham acknowledged internally in 1998, that the study had failed to show efficacy for paroxetine in adolescent depression. (Note: SmithKline Beecham (October 1998): "Study 329 (conducted in the US) showed trends in efficacy in favour of Seroxat/Paxil across all indices of depression. However, the study failed to demonstrate a statistically significant difference from placebo on the primary efficacy measures." U.S. Food and Drug Administration to GlaxoSmithKline (21 October 2002): "We agree that ... the results from Studies 329, 377, and 701 failed to demonstrate the efficacy of Paxil in pediatric patients with MDD. Given the fact that negative trials are frequently seen, even for antidepressant drugs that we know are effective, we agree that it would not be useful to describe these negative trials in labeling." UK Medicines and Healthcare products Regulatory Agency report (6 March 2008): "The first trial conducted by SKB, trial number 329, failed to show that Seroxat was effective in treating major depressive disorder in children. A second trial, number 377, was conducted and this also failed to show that Seroxat was effective. Both studies were completed towards the end of 1998. SKB made no amendment to the SPC on the basis of these data. An internal GSK management document (which subsequently came into the public domain) dated October 1998 says that 'it would be commercially unacceptable to include a statement that efficacy had not been demonstrated, as this would undermine the profile of paroxetine'. During 1999, 32,000 Seroxat prescriptions were issued to children in the UK.") In addition, more patients in the group taking paroxetine had experienced suicidal thinking and behaviour. (Note: Wayne Kondro and Barbara Sibbald (Canadian Medical Association Journal, 2004): "Study 329 was eventually published (J Am Acad Child Adolesc Psychiatry 2001;40[7]:762-72) in 2001. The authors concluded that paroxetine is 'generally well tolerated and effective for major depression in adolescents.' Among the 93 adolescents taking Seroxat, there were 5 serious cases of 'emotional lability' (e.g., suicidal ideation/gestures). Among the 95 patients taking the comparison treatment, imipramine (Tofranil), there was 1 such case, and among the 89 subjects receiving placebo there was also 1. According to the article, only 1 serious adverse event—headache in 1 patient—was considered by the treating investigator to be related to paroxetine treatment.") Although the JAACAP article included these negative results, it did not account for them in its conclusion; on the contrary, it concluded that paroxetine was "generally well tolerated and effective for major depression in adolescents". The company relied on the JAACAP article to promote paroxetine for off-label use in teenagers. (Note: In August 2001, a month after publication, a member of GSK's Paxil Product Management team sent a memo to "all sales representatives selling Paxil" calling study 329 a "'cutting-edge,' landmark study", and stating that "Paxil demonstrates REMARKABLE Efficacy and Safety in the treatment of adolescent depression.")

In 2003 Britain's Medicines and Healthcare products Regulatory Agency (MHRA) analysed study 329 and other GSK studies of paroxetine, concluding that, while there was no evidence of paroxetine's efficacy in children and adolescents, there was "robust evidence" of a causal link between the drug and suicidal behaviour. (Note: Medicines and Healthcare products Regulatory Agency (6 March 2008): "The significance of the data provided in the GSK briefing document was that they represented robust evidence from controlled studies of a causal association between an SSRI and suicidal behaviour. It had previously been argued by some manufacturers that a causal link could not be drawn between suicidality and SSRIs because no link was evident from (adult) clinical trial data. On examination of the full clinical trial data in children submitted by GSK urgently on 27 May 2003 in response to requests from the Agency, it became clear that the evidence base for the safety concern of an increased risk of suicidal behaviour was derived from pooled analysis of all the trials (a meta-analysis). It was only when the trials were analysed together that the safety issue became apparent. These trials had been conducted over a number of years and some had been published in part, however the publications gave an incomplete and partial picture of the full data. Importantly, the trials conducted in a range of conditions in children and adolescents failed to demonstrate that Seroxat was effective in the treatment of depressive illness.") The following month the MHRA and US Food and Drug Administration (FDA) advised doctors not to prescribe paroxetine to the under-18s. The MHRA launched a criminal inquiry into GSK's conduct, but announced in 2008, that there would be no charges. In 2004, New York State Attorney Eliot Spitzer sued GSK for having withheld data, and in 2012 the United States Department of Justice fined the company $3 billion, including a sum for withholding data on paroxetine, unlawfully promoting it for the under-18s, and preparing a misleading article on study 329. (Note: United States Department of Justice (2 July 2012): "The United States alleges that, among other things, GSK participated in preparing, publishing and distributing a misleading medical journal article that misreported that a clinical trial of Paxil demonstrated efficacy in the treatment of depression in patients under age 18, when the study failed to demonstrate efficacy.") The company denied that it had withheld data, and said it was only when data from its nine paediatric trials on paroxetine were analysed together that "an increased rate of suicidal thinking or attempted suicide [was] revealed".

The JAACAP article on study 329 has not been retracted. The journal's editors say the negative findings are included in a table, and that therefore there are no grounds to withdraw the article. In September 2015 the BMJ published a re-analysis of the study. This concluded that neither paroxetine nor imipramine had differed in efficacy from placebo in treating depression, that the paroxetine group had experienced more suicidal ideation and behaviour, and that the imipramine group had experienced more cardiovascular problems.

== Clinical trial ==
=== Overview ===
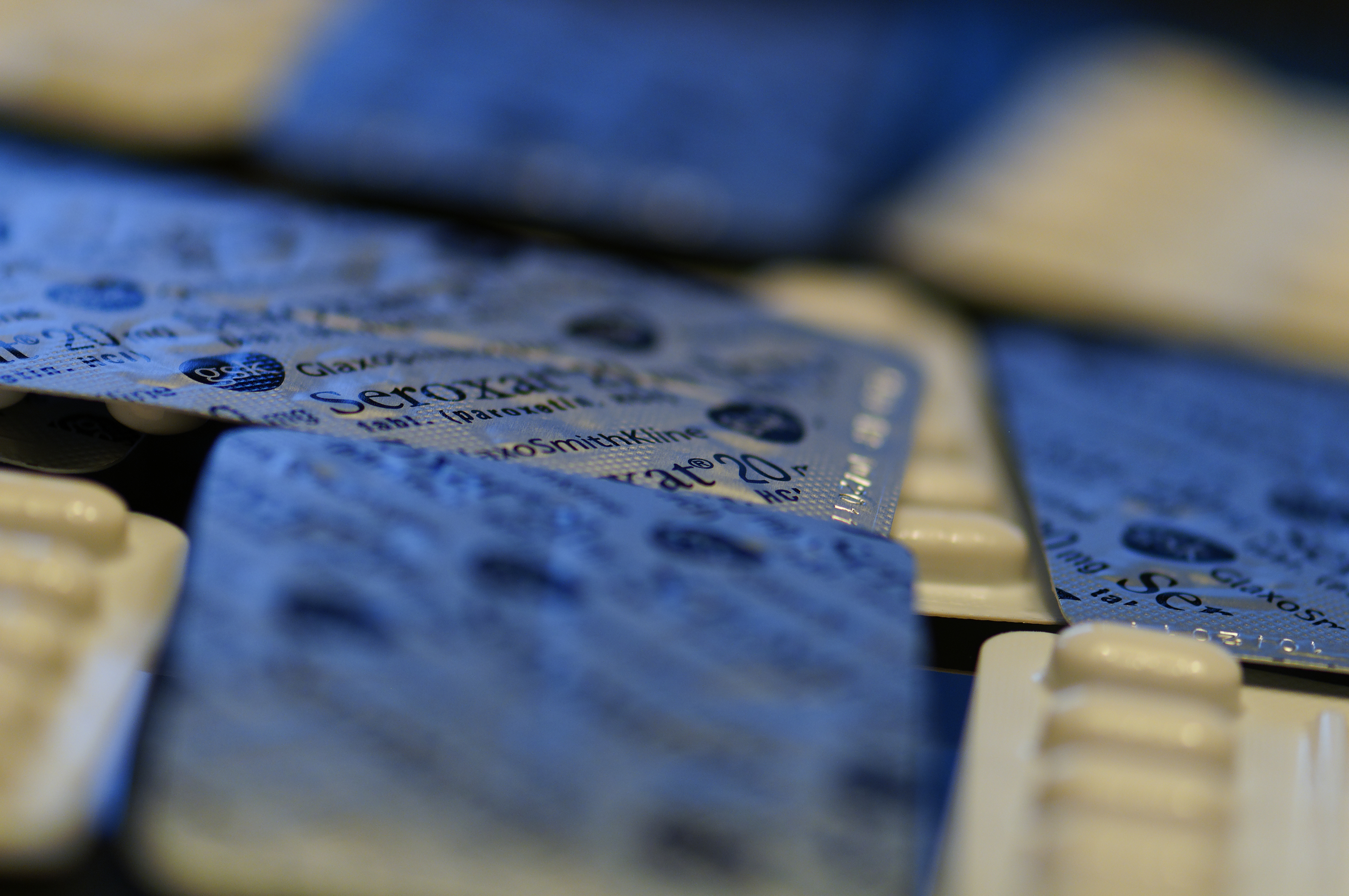
Over two million prescriptions for paroxetine were written for children or adolescents in the US in 2002.

Funded by SmithKline Beecham, the acute phase of study 329 was an eight-week, double-blind, randomized clinical trial conducted in 12 university or hospital psychiatric departments in the United States and Canada between 1994 and 1997. The study compared paroxetine, a selective serotonin reuptake inhibitor marketed as Paxil and Seroxat, with imipramine, a tricyclic antidepressant marketed as Tofranil, in teenagers aged 12–18 with a diagnosis of major depressive disorder of at least eight weeks duration. Martin Keller, then professor of psychiatry at Brown University, had proposed the trial to the company in 1992 as the largest study until then to examine the efficacy of SSRIs in children.

After a screening phase from April 1994, 275 male and female patients were randomly assigned paroxetine, imipramine or placebo (an inert pill). Of the 275, 93 were given paroxetine, 95 imipramine and 89 placebo. The paroxetine group were given 20 mg daily for four weeks, rising to 30 mg at week five and 40 mg at week six if the clinician thought it appropriate. The last study visit was in May 1997, and the blind was broken in October.

=== Efficacy ===
The trial's protocol had described two primary and six secondary outcomes by which it would measure efficacy. The data showed that, according to those eight outcomes, paroxetine was no more effective than placebo. According to Melanie Newman, writing for the BMJ, "[t]he drug only produced a positive result when four new secondary outcome measures, which were introduced following the initial data analysis, were used instead. Fifteen other new secondary outcome measures failed to throw up positive results." (Note: Melanie Newman, BMJ, 2010: "Study 329's results showed that paroxetine was no more effective than the placebo according to measurements of eight outcomes specified by Martin Keller, professor of psychiatry at Brown University, when he first drew up the trial. "Two of these were primary outcomes: the change in total Hamilton Rating Scale (HAM-D) score, and the proportion of 'responders' at the end of the eight-week acute treatment phase (those with a ≥50% reduction in HAM-D or a HAM-D score ≤8). The drug also showed no significant effect for the initial six secondary outcome measures. "The drug only produced a positive result when four new secondary outcome measures, which were introduced following the initial data analysis, were used instead. Fifteen other new secondary outcome measures failed to throw up positive results.")

=== Safety ===
Eleven subjects on paroxetine, compared to five on imipramine and two on placebo, experienced serious adverse events (SAE), including behavioral problems and emotional lability. The researchers defined an event as an SAE if it resulted in hospitalization, involved suicidal gestures, or was regarded as serious by the subject's doctor. In the 93 taking paroxetine, the SAEs consisted of one subject experiencing headache while tapering off, and 10 experiencing psychiatric problems. Seven of the 10 were hospitalized. Two of the 10 experienced worsening depression; two conduct problems such as aggression; one euphoria; and five emotional lability, including suicidal ideation and behaviour. Of the 95 patients on imipramine and the 89 on placebo, one in each group experienced emotional lability. Yet Keller's article in the Journal of the American Academy of Child and Adolescent Psychiatry concluded that, of the 11 patients who had experienced SAEs while taking paroxetine, "only headache (1 patient) was considered by the treating investigator to be related to paroxetine treatment".

== 1998 SmithKline Beecham position paper ==
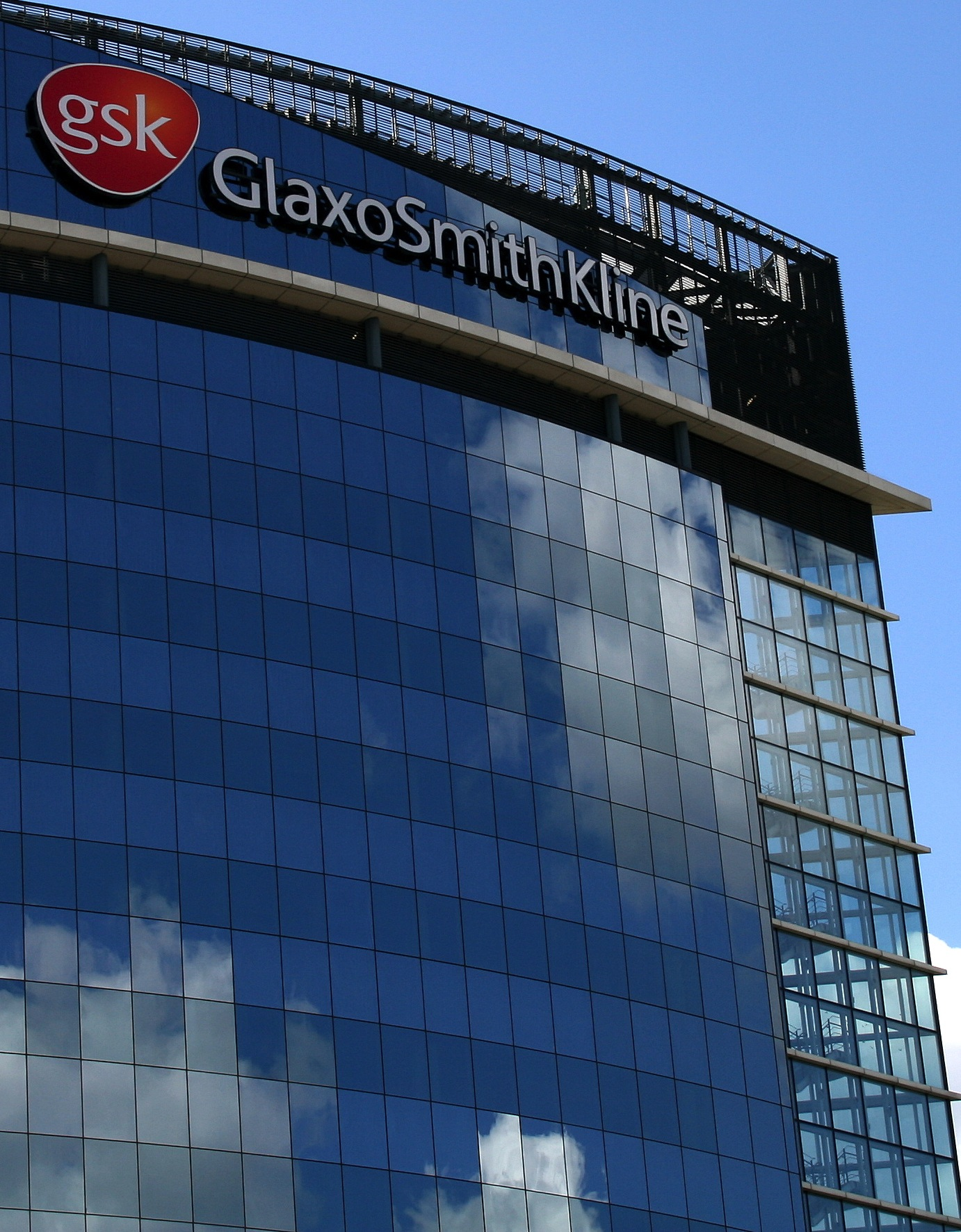
GlaxoSmithKline global headquarters, Brentford, west London

In October 1998 the neurosciences division of SmithKline Beecham's Central Medical Affairs (CMAT) department distributed a position paper, "Seroxat/Paxil Adolescent Depression: Position piece on the phase III clinical studies", that discussed studies 329 and 377. The latter was a 12-week trial, comparing paroxetine and placebo in teenagers, conducted from 1995 to 1998. (Note: Study 377 was conducted in 33 centres in Europe (Belgium, Netherlands, Italy, Spain, UK), Canada, South America (Argentina and Mexico), South Africa and the United Arab Emirates.)

The SmithKline Beecham position paper explained that the company had decided not to submit trial data from studies 329 and 377 to regulators, and discussed how to "effectively manage the dissemination of these data in order to minimise any potential negative commercial impact". An attached memo noted that the results were disappointing and would not support a label claim that paroxetine could be used to treat adolescents: "The best that could have been achieved was a statement that, although safety data was reassuring, efficacy had not been demonstrated." The paper said: "it would be commercially unacceptable to include a statement that efficacy had not been demonstrated, as this would undermine the profile of paroxetine."

Study 329 had shown "trends in efficacy in favour of Seroxat/Paxil across all indices of depression ...", according to the paper, "[but had] failed to demonstrate a statistically significant difference from placebo on the primary efficacy measures". Study 377 had shown a high placebo response rate and had "failed [to] demonstrate any separation of Seroxat/Paxil from placebo". SmithKline Beecham decided to publish study 329 but not 377, and not to submit either trial to the regulators, because they were "insufficiently robust to support a regulatory submission and label change for this patient population".

The document was leaked during a lawsuit and first published by the Canadian Medical Association Journal in March 2004. In response a GSK spokesperson said that "the memo draws an inappropriate conclusion and is not consistent with the facts ... GSK abided by all regulatory requirements for submitting safety data. We also communicated safety and efficacy data to physicians through posters, abstracts, and other publications."

== JAACAP article ==
=== Authorship ===
Although the JAACAP article listed its authors as Martin Keller and 21 other physicians or researchers, the article had in fact been ghostwritten by Scientific Therapeutics Information (STI), a PR company in Springfield, New Jersey, specializing in communications for the pharmaceutical industry. The JAACAP article did not mention STI; the only mention of Laden was: "Editorial assistance was provided by Sally K. Laden, M.S." The list of authors included James P. McCafferty of GSK, but the article did not disclose his company affiliation.

STI had worked with SmithKline Beecham on its promotion of paroxetine since the early 1990s. (Note: In 1993, for example, STI sent a proposal to GSK for a meeting between its psychiatrist advisory board and Paxil advisory board in the Ritz Carlton Hotel in Palm Beach, Florida.) In April 1998 Sally K. Laden and John A. Romankiewicz of STI sent SmithKline Beecham an estimate of $17,250 to work on six drafts of the study 329 paper, including the final draft, to cover the period up to March 1999. The sum was payable in installments: $8,500 upon initiation, $5,125 after draft three, and $3,625 upon submission to the journal.

The estimate covered all writing, editing, library research, copy editing, art work and coordination with the physicians and others who would be named as authors. Martin Keller would be listed as the main author. The first draft was ready by December 1998. SmithKline Beecham documents show that Laden and STI coordinated the entire publication process, including writing the cover letter to the journal that published the article, JAACAP, which she sent to Keller with the instruction that he transfer it to his own letterhead.

=== Publication ===
STI first submitted the article to the Journal of the American Medical Association (JAMA), which rejected it in November 1999. Concerns cited by JAMA reviewers included that "the main finding of the study is the high placebo response rate". They also suggested that the named authors confirm they had been "granted full access to the data set to verify the accuracy of the report".

Early drafts of the paper for JAMA did not mention the serious adverse events (SAEs). A SmithKline Beecham scientist, James McCafferty, added a paragraph about these in July 1999, adding that 11 patients on paroxetine had experienced SAEs, against two on placebo: "worsening depression, emotional lability, headache, and hostility were considered related or possibly related to treatment." This was changed in the final draft to: "Of the 11 patients, only headache (1 patient) was considered by the treating investigator to be related to paroxetine treatment."

In December 1999 Laden submitted the rewritten paper to JAACAP, led at the time by Mina K. Dulcan, editor-in-chief. According to Melanie Newman in the BMJ, JAACAP's reviewers wrote that the results did not "clearly demonstrate efficacy for paroxetine", and asked whether, because of the high placebo response rate, SSRIs should be regarded as first-line therapy. JAACAP accepted the article in January 2001, and published it in July.

The article concluded: "Paroxetine is generally well tolerated and effective for major depression in adolescents." McCafferty's paragraph about worsening depression and emotional lability possibly being related to the treatment had been removed. The only SAE attributed to paroxetine in the JAACAP article was in one patient who had reported headache. The article continued: "Because these serious adverse events were judged by the investigator to be related to treatment in only 4 patients (paroxetine, 1; imipramine, 2; placebo, 1), causality cannot be determined conclusively." It concluded: "The findings of this study provide evidence of the efficacy and safety of the SSRI, paroxetine, in the treatment of adolescent depression."

== 2001 GlaxoSmithKline sales memo, off-label use ==
GSK used the JAACAP article to promote paroxetine to doctors for use in their teenage patients. The drug had not been approved for use in children and adolescents. Drug companies are prohibited from promoting drugs for unapproved uses, but doctors are permitted to prescribe drugs for what is known as off-label use. In the UK 32,000 prescriptions of paroxetine were written for children and adolescents in 1999, and in the US that figure rose to 2.1 million in 2002, earning GSK $55 million.

On 7 August 2001 Sally Laden of STI, apparently the main author of the JAACAP article, arranged for GSK to buy 500 reprints of the article—300 for Keller and 200 for Zachary Hawkins of GSK's Paxil Product Management team—to be distributed to the company's neuroscience sales force. On 16 August 2001 Zachary Hawkins sent a memo about study 329 to "All Sales Representatives Selling Paxil", calling study 329 a "cutting-edge,' landmark study", the first to compare efficacy of a selective serotonin reuptake inhibitor and a tricyclic antidepressant with placebo in the treatment of depressed adolescents. "Paxil demonstrates REMARKABLE Efficacy and Safety in the treatment of adolescent depression," he wrote.

The memo continued that paroxetine was "significantly more effective than placebo" on certain outcomes: "Paxil was generally well tolerated in this adolescent population and most adverse events were not serious. The most common adverse events occurred at rates that were similar to rates in the placebo group." It ended with:

In conclusion, the findings of this study provide evidence of the efficacy and safety of Paxil in the treatment of adolescent depression. Here's another example of GlaxoSmithKline's commitment to Psychiatry by bringing forth 'cutting edge' scientific data. Paxil is truly a REMARKABLE product that continues to demonstrate efficacy, even in this understudied population."

== Inquiries in the United Kingdom ==
=== BBC Panorama, MHRA ===
Scottish reporter Shelley Jofre presented four investigative programmes on paroxetine for BBC Panorama between 2002 and 2007, including one devoted to study 329, "Secrets of the Drug Trials", in January 2007. The 2007 programme was based on thousands of internal company documents produced during lawsuits pursued against GSK by patients and families.

Jofre's interest in paroxetine was triggered by the July 2001 case of Timothy J. Tobin v. SmithKline Beecham Pharmaceuticals in the United States. The family of 60-year-old Donald Schell sued the company after Schell shot and killed his wife, daughter and baby granddaughter, then committed suicide, 48 hours after starting a course of paroxetine in 1998. A Wyoming jury awarded the plaintiffs $6.4 million.

The first of Jofre's programmes, "The Secrets of Seroxat", aired on 13 October 2002, and covered the Schell case, study 329, and GSK's efforts to market the drug for use in children. (At the time the Summary of Product Characteristics for paroxetine in Europe said that its use in children was "not recommended as safety and efficacy have not been established in this population".) Discussing study 329 and the paediatric use of paroxetine, Alistair Benbow, head of European psychiatry for GlaxoSmithKline, told Jofre that, during study 329, paroxetine had been "generally well tolerated by this difficult to treat population". (Note: NICK ALCOCK, pharmaceutical company analyst ("The Secrets of Seroxat", BBC Panorama, 13 October 2002): "In the United States, if a company such as GlaxoSmithKline can gain an additional licence for the treatment of children, it means that they get a six month extension to their overall patent." JOFRE: "And is that worth a lot of money?" ALCOCK: "For Paxil it's worth ... six month's worth of sales is around a billion dollars, so yes." JOFRE: "That billion dollar windfall now looks tantalisingly close, thanks to a recent study co-written by American child psychiatrist Neal Ryan. It was the biggest ever trial of Seroxat in children funded by Glaxo SmithKline. The depressed children who took Seroxat did better than those who took an older drug, or were just given sugar pills. That's the good news. The bad news is that ten of the ninety-three children on Seroxat suffered serious psychiatric problems within weeks of going on the drug. Most of them had to be hospitalised. There were five children out of ninety-three children on Seroxat who had suicidal thoughts and gestures. Another five out of that ninety-three had serious psychiatric side effects. Don't you think parents would be worried about that if their child was to be given this drug?" Dr ALASTAIR BENBOW, Head of European Clinical Psychiatry, GlaxoSmithKline: "I think what parents would be more worried about is the risk that their children have of committing suicide and other symptoms of severe depression if no treatment was available. I think parents would want treatments to be properly evaluated during clinical trials before their children are given any medicine." JOFRE: "But the evidence here suggest that their children might be at more risk of suicide if they go on Seroxat." BENBOW: "No, the evidence is not there, there is no statistical difference between the groups. The reality of the situation is that in this trial, Seroxat was generally well tolerated by this difficult to treat population.")

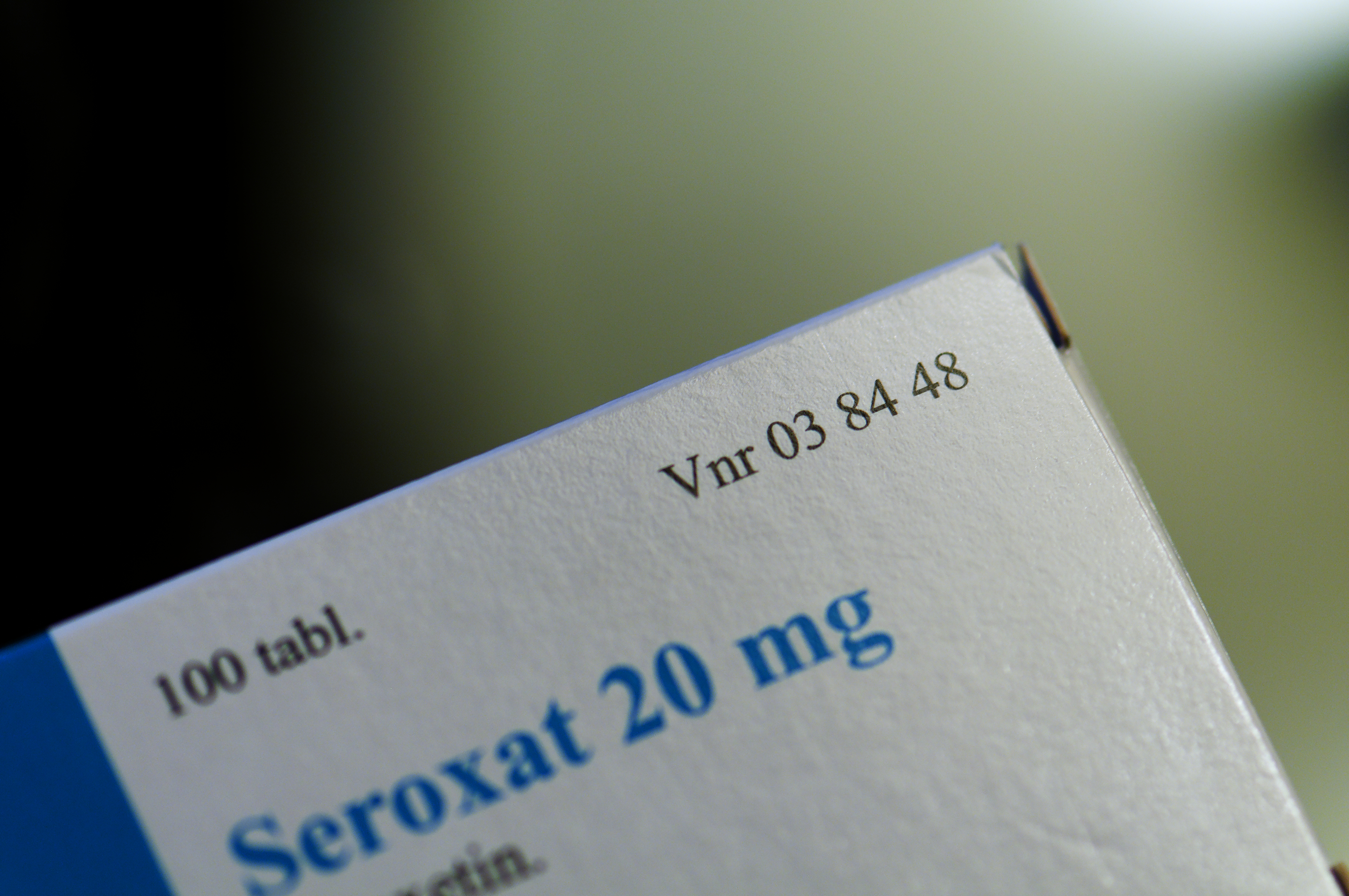
Paroxetine is sold in the UK as Seroxat.

To examine the issues that Panorama had raised, Britain's Medicines and Healthcare products Regulatory Agency (MHRA) set up an ad hoc group of experts, which held a meeting with GSK on 14 November 2002. The MHRA asked GSK about its clinical trials in children. GSK was planning to apply for pediatric indications for paroxetine. According to the MHRA, "GSK did not raise any concern about lack of efficacy or adverse reactions in the clinical trials in the paediatric population at that meeting."

Jofre's second Panorama programme on paroxetine, "Emails from the edge" (11 May 2003) focused on the 67,000 calls and 1,400 e-mails the BBC received, after the first programme, from people taking the drug. They reported withdrawal symptoms, as well as acts of violence and self-harm that they believed were attributable to paroxetine. During this programme, Benbow told Jofre: "We have been asked by the regulatory authorities to provide all our information related to suicides and I can tell you the data that we provide to them clearly shows no link between Seroxat and an increased risk of suicide—no link."

=== May 2003 GlaxoSmithKline briefing paper ===
In February 2003 the MHRA's Committee on the Safety of Medicines (CSM) set up an Expert Working Group to investigate SSRIs and safety. In preparation for its first meeting, the MHRA met GSK on 21 May 2003 to make sure that GSK had supplied all information relevant to paroxetine and safety, and to discuss Jofre's second Panorama programme.

Toward the end of the meeting, GSK handed over a 79-page briefing paper, "Paroxetine: Critical evaluation of paroxetine hydrochloride for the treatment of Paediatric Obsessive Compulsive Disorder and Social Anxiety Disorder in children and adolescents", dated 20 May 2003. The paper included data from nine clinical trials GSK had conducted on paroxetine and children between April 1994 and September 2002:

"Description of clinical programme for children"
Study no.		Treatment duration	Design	Age range	Paroxetine dosages (mg/day)	No. of patients
704	OCD	10 weeks	Randomized, db, parallel group, pc, flexible dose	7–17	10–50	203
676	SAD	16 weeks	Randomized, db, parallel group, pc, flexible dose	8–17	10–50	318
329	MDD	8 weeks	Randomized (1:1:1) db, parallel group, pc and actively controlled (imipramine), flexible dose	12–18	20–40	271
377	MDD	12 weeks	Randomized (2:1), db, parallel group, pc, flexible dose	13–18	20–40	274
701	MDD	8 weeks	Randomized, db, parallel group, pc, flexible dose	7–17	10–40	203
453	OCD/MDD	32 weeks	Two-phase, relapse prevention design. Phase 1: 16 weeks, open-label paroxetine, flexible dose. "Responders" proceed to Phase II.	8–17	10–60	335
			Phase II: 16 weeks, randomized, db, parallel group, pc, fixed dose (dose at end of Phase 1)			193
329	OCD/MDD	6 months	Db, parallel group, continuation of responders from study 329 (acute)	12–18	20–40	125
716	OCD/MDD	6 months	Open-label, extension for patients from studies 701 704 and 715	7–17	10–50	265
715	OCD/MDD	6 weeks	Open-label, dose-rising, repeat dose, PK study	7–17	10–30	62

The briefing paper concluded that "analysis of the safety data demonstrates that paroxetine is generally well tolerated by paediatric patients ...," but suggested a label change to the effect that efficacy had not been established in children with major depressive disorder, and that adverse reactions could include hyperkinesia, hostility, emotional lability and agitation. The paper said these had occurred around twice as much in the paroxetine group than in those taking placebo.

By "emotional lability", the paper alluded in particular to suicidal thoughts and behaviour. Of 20 reports of adverse events in the paroxetine groups, 12 had been suidical thoughts or suicide attempts (none successful), three self-mutilation and five general emotional lability. There had been eight adverse events in the patients taking placebo, of which four were suicidal thoughts or behaviour, one self-mutilation and three emotional lability.

The paper suggested a label change regarding withdrawal symptoms, which it said had occurred with paroxetine at roughly twice the rate of placebo.

=== MHRA response ===
Alasdair Breckenridge, then-chair of the MHRA, told Panorama that the GSK briefing document caused "a very dramatic change in our thinking about Seroxat and children". The MHRA asked GSK to submit the full clinical data, which they did on 27 May 2003. The data provided "robust evidence" of a causal link between paroxetine and suicidality, and no evidence that paroxetine was effective in treating depression in children. The MHRA wrote:

On examination of the full clinical trial data in children submitted by GSK urgently on 27 May 2003 in response to requests from the Agency, it became clear that the evidence base for the safety concern of an increased risk of suicidal behaviour was derived from pooled analysis of all the trials (a meta-analysis). It was only when the trials were analysed together that the safety issue became apparent. These trials had been conducted over a number of years and some had been published in part, however the publications gave an incomplete and partial picture of the full data. Importantly, the trials conducted in a range of conditions in children and adolescents failed to demonstrate that Seroxat was effective in the treatment of depressive illness.

The analysis suggested an increased rate of suicidal thinking and behaviour of 3.4 percent on paroxetine versus 1.2 percent on placebo. The committee concluded that the risks outweighed the benefits, and on 10 June 2003 issued an advisory to physicians not to prescribe paroxetine to the under-18s. The US Food and Drug Administration followed suit nine days later.

=== Criminal inquiry ===
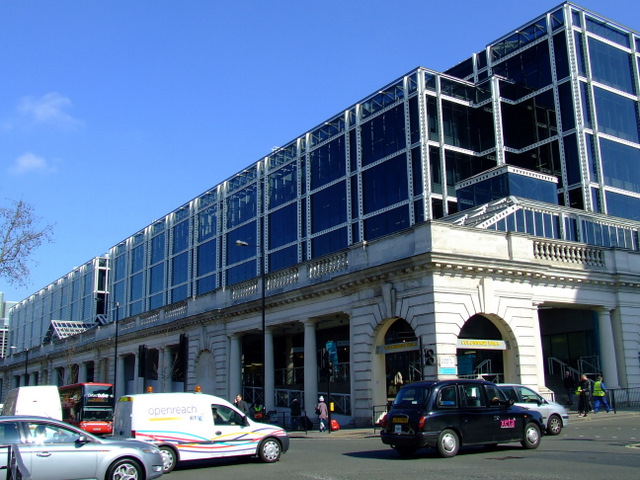
The MHRA offices on Buckingham Palace Road, London. The MHRA announced in 2008 that GSK would not be prosecuted.

The MHRA launched a criminal inquiry in October 2003 into GSK's conduct. This was based on two concerns: (a) the length of time between the end of the trials and GSK's passing the safety concerns to the MHRA; and (b) the manner in which the material had been handed over. Rather than alerting the MHRA of a risk, GSK had supplied the data in relation to an application to extend the indications of paroxetine to children. The MHRA deemed this inappropriate for an urgent safety concern because of the length of time such applications can take.

Medical ethicists Linsey McGoey and Emily Jackson argued that the 1998 SmithKline Beecham position paper, in which the company said it had decided not to show studies 329 and 377 to regulators, represented a prima facie breach of the Medicines Act 1968 and Medicines for Human Use Regulations, which required pharmaceutical companies to pass to the regulator trial data that had safety and efficacy implications.

The MHRA reviewed around one million pages of documentation in the course of the inquiry. After a four-year investigation, independent counsel instructed by the MHRA advised, according to an MHRA report, that "no offence ha[d] been committed contrary to the 1994 Regulations [Medicines for Human Use (Marketing Authorisations Etc.) Regulations 1994]", because GSK's clinical trials and alleged failure to provide data from them "most likely did not fall within the regime implemented by those Regulations". If the 1994 Regulations did apply, the report said, the "relevant provisions were not sufficiently clear so as to permit a criminal sanction for their breach". The MHRA announced in March 2008 that there would be no prosecution. In October 2008 the 1994 Regulations were amended to prevent a repetition of the case.

== Inquiries in the United States ==
=== The Boston Globe ===
In November 1995 Alison Bass of The Boston Globe began investigating Brown University's psychiatry department, chaired by Martin Keller, who led Study 329. There were allegations that the department had taken $218,000 of government funds for research that apparently had not been conducted. In October 1999 she reported Keller's financial relationship with the pharmaceutical industry, which included receipt of $500,000 in consulting fees the previous year. Bass's work developed into a book about GlaxoSmithKline, paroxetine, and Study 329, Side Effects: A Prosecutor, a Whistleblower, and a Bestselling Antidepressant on Trial (2008).

=== FDA-mandated review ===
In March 2004 the FDA mandated that drug companies review the use of their SSRIs in children. In 2006 GSK researchers published a review of five of their trials involving paroxetine and adolescents or children, including study 329 and the unpublished study 377. They wrote that suicidal ideation or behaviour had occurred in 22 of 642 patients on paroxetine (3.4 percent) against five of 549 on placebo (0.9 percent). The article concluded: "Adolescents treated with paroxetine showed an increased risk of suicide-related events. ... The presence of uncontrolled suicide risk factors, the relatively low incidence of these events, and their predominance in adolescents with MDD make it difficult to identify a single cause for suicidality in these pediatric patients.

=== People v. GlaxoSmithKline ===
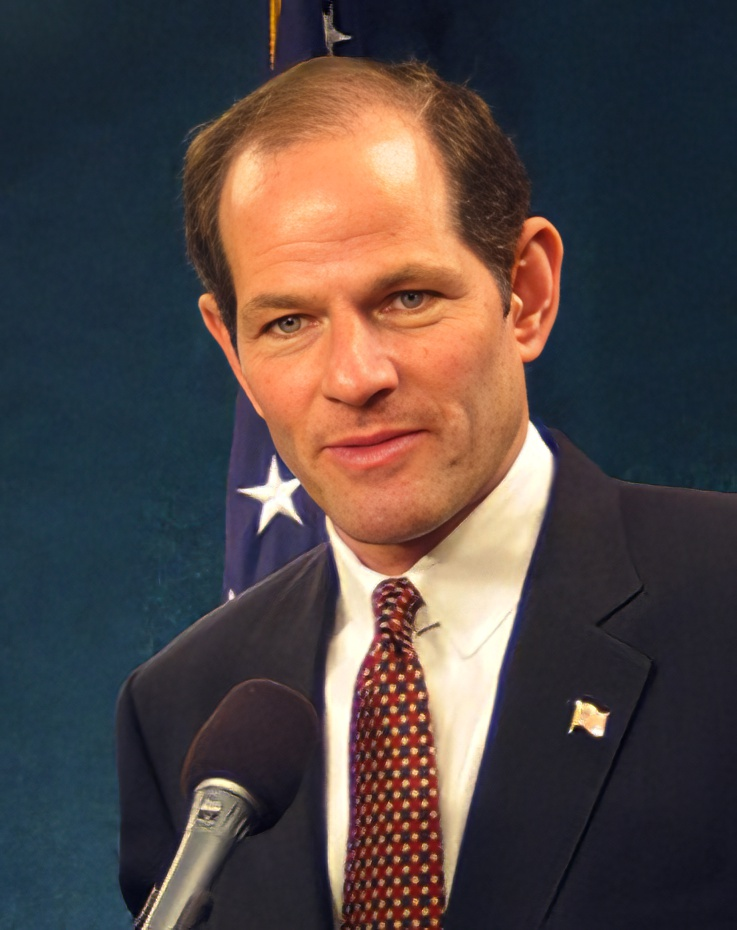
Eliot Spitzer

In June 2004 New York State Attorney Eliot Spitzer filed a lawsuit against GSK in the New York State Supreme Court for having withheld clinical trial data about paroxetine, including from study 329. GSK denied any wrongdoing and said it had disclosed the data to regulators, and to physicians at medical conventions and in other ways.

GSK settled the case in August 2004, agreeing to pay $2.5 million, make its trial data about paroxetine and children available on its website, and establish a clinical trial register that would host summaries of all company-sponsored trials going back to 27 December 2000. By October 2004 other drug companies, including Pfizer, Eli Lilly and Merck, had agreed to create their own registers. In 2013 GSK joined AllTrials, a British campaign to have all clinical trials registered and the results reported.

=== Other lawsuits ===
By 2009 GSK had paid almost $1 billion to settle paroxetine-related lawsuits related to 450 suicides, withholding data, as well as addiction, antitrust and other claims. An additional 600 unsettled claims related to birth defects. The lawsuits produced thousands of internal company documents, some of which entered the public domain. These formed the basis of some of Alison Bass's work and that of Shelley Jofre for the BBC.

=== United States v. GlaxoSmithKline ===
In October 2011 the United States Department of Justice filed a lawsuit under the False Claims Act accusing GSK of promoting drugs for unapproved uses, failing to report safety data, reporting false prices to Medicaid, and paying kickbacks to physicians in the form of gifts, trips and sham consultancy fees. The complaint included preparing the JAACAP article about study 329, exaggerating paroxetine's efficacy while downplaying the risks, and using the article to promote the drug for adolescent use, which was not approved by the FDA.

GSK pleaded guilty in 2012 and paid a $3 billion settlement, including a criminal fine of $1 billion. The fine included an amount for "preparing, publishing and distributing a misleading medical journal article that misreported that a clinical trial of Paxil demonstrated efficacy in the treatment of depression in patients under age 18, when the study failed to demonstrate efficacy". (Note: Simon Neville (The Guardian, 3 July 2012): "GSK also published an article in a medical journal that mis-stated the drug's safety for children, despite the journal asking several times to change the wording. "Copies of the misleading article were given to sales representatives to pass on to doctors in the hope that it would secure more business. Tickets to sports matches were exchanged for discussions about Paxil, with one doctor writing: 'Dinner and a Yankee game with family. Talked about Paxil studies in children.' "Despite knowing that three trials had failed to prove its effectiveness on children, Glaxo published a report entitled 'Positioning Paxil in the adolescent depression market – getting a headstart'".)

== Calls for retraction ==
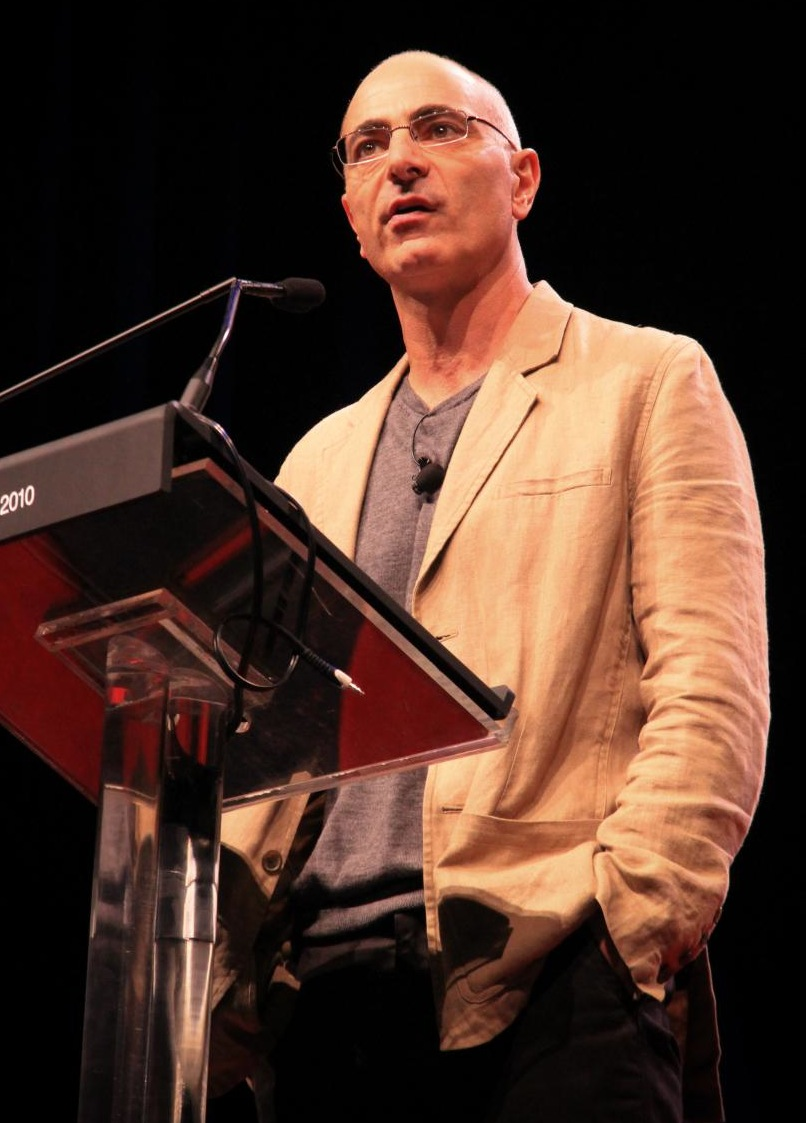
Jon Jureidini

Child psychiatrist Jon Jureidini of the Women's and Children's Hospital in Adelaide and Ann Tonkin of the University of Adelaide asked JAACAP in 2003 to retract the study 329 paper. (Note: The Committee on Publication Ethics states that journal editors should consider retracting an article if, inter alia, "they have clear evidence that the findings are unreliable, either as a result of misconduct ... or honest error.")

In 2005 the philosopher Leemon McHenry complained to JAACAP's editor, Mina Dulcan, that Keller and some of the other researchers named as authors had worked for GSK but had not declared their conflict of interest and had violated the journal's policy regarding authorship. Keller had acted as a consultant for several drug companies. The Boston Globe reported in 1999 that he had earned $500,000 the previous year from consultancy work, which, the newspaper said, he did not disclose to the journals that published his work or to the American Psychiatric Association. Dulcan replied to McHenry that "unless there is a specific accusation of research fraud, it is not the role of scientific journals to police authorship."

Jureidini and McHenry called again for the paper's retraction in 2009. Editor-in-chief Andrés Martin replied that there was no justification for retraction, and that the journal had "conformed to the best publication practices prevailing at the time". In April 2013 Jureidini asked GSK's CEO Andrew Witty to request retraction. In September 2025, the journal labelled the article with an "expression of concern", which states that "further review is underway".

== RIAT re-analysis of study 329 ==
In July 2013 Jureidini announced his intention to produce a new write-up of study 329 in accordance with the RIAT initiative (restoring invisible and abandoned trials). The RIAT researchers—Joanna Le Noury, John M. Nardo, David Healy, Jon Jureidini, Melissa Raven, Catalin Tufanaru, and Elia Abi-Jaoude—published their re-analysis in the BMJ in September 2015. They concluded that "[t]he efficacy of paroxetine and imipramine was not statistically or clinically significantly different from placebo for any prespecified primary or secondary efficacy outcome," and that there were "clinically significant increases in ... suicidal ideation and behaviour and other serious adverse events in the paroxetine group and cardiovascular problems in the imipramine group."

== Anti-depressants and suicidality in young people ==
In 2007 the FDA required that all anti-depressants include a boxed warning of an increased risk of suicidal thoughts and behaviour in young adults (18–24 years) during the first one to two months of treatment. (Note: Food and Drug Administration (June 2014): "Paxil and other antidepressant medicines may increase suicidal thoughts or actions in some children, teenagers, or young adults within the first few months of treatment or when the dose is changed.") A 2012 Cochrane review on the use of SSRIs in children and adolescents concluded that there is evidence of an increased suicide risk in patients treated with antidepressants. It added: "However, given the risks of untreated depression in terms of completed suicide and impacts on functioning, if a decision to use medication is agreed, then fluoxetine might be the medication of first choice given guideline recommendations." (Note: Sarah E. Hetrick, et al. (Cochrane Database of Systematic Reviews, 14 November 2012): "Caution is required in interpreting the results given the methodological limitations of the included trials in terms of internal and external validity. Further, the size and clinical meaningfulness of statistically significant results are uncertain. However, given the risks of untreated depression in terms of completed suicide and impacts on functioning, if a decision to use medication is agreed, then fluoxetine might be the medication of first choice given guideline recommendations. Clinicians need to keep in mind that there is evidence of an increased risk of suicide-related outcomes in those treated with antidepressant medications.")

== See also ==
- AllTrials
- ClinicalTrials.gov
- Drug Industry Documents Archive
- IFPMA Clinical Trials Portal
- List of medical ethics cases
- Pharmacovigilance
