= Opioid Industry Documents Archive =

Opioid industry document archive

The UCSF-JHU Opioid Industry Documents Archive (OIDA) is a collaborative undertaking between the University of California, San Francisco and Johns Hopkins University. The archive is made available through the larger UCSF Industry Documents Library which also includes the Truth Tobacco Industry Documents, Drug Industry Document Archive, Food Industry Documents Archive, Chemical Industry Documents Archive, and the Fossil Fuel Industry Documents Archive.

OIDA contains millions of internal corporate records publicly disclosed from ongoing opioid litigation brought by local and state governments and tribal communities against opioid manufacturers, wholesalers, distributors, and pharmacies. These lawsuits argue that opioid manufacturers and other industry actors pursued manipulative and misleading marketing strategies, cast doubt on the addictiveness of the drug, failed to carry out suspicious order monitoring, and disregarded the significant risks to health, leading to a national opioid overdose epidemic and public health crisis.

UCSF and JHU have been authorized to serve as the public document repository for these documents from opioid litigation according to court orders and to agreements with various State Attorneys General.

Researchers, journalists, students, and activists interested in the root causes of the US opioid crisis use the archive extensively to investigate opioid industry strategies.

== Collections ==
- Teva and Allergan documents
- Endo Pharmaceuticals
- Mallinckrodt
- McKinsey & Co
- Insys Therapeutics
- Walgreens and Pharmacy Litigation collections
- Pharmacy Benefit Managers collection
- Purdue Pharma collections

and more...
