= American Academy of Child and Adolescent Psychiatry =

Non-profit psychiatry for children and adolescents

- Formation: 1953
- Type: professional association
- Headquarters: 3615 Wisconsin Ave., NW; Washington, D.C., U.S.
- Location: United States
- Members: Over 10,000
- Official language: English
- 2025–present President: John T. Walkup, MD
- Executive Director/CEO: Heidi B. Fordi, CAE
- Website: aacap.org

The American Academy of Child and Adolescent Psychiatry (AACAP) is a 501(c)(3) non-profit professional association in the United States dedicated to facilitating psychiatric care for children and adolescents. The Academy is headquartered in Washington, D.C. Various levels of membership are available to physicians specialized in child psychiatry or pediatrics, as well as medical students interested in the field, in the United States and abroad.

Established in 1953 as the American Academy of Child Psychiatry (AACP), it became the American Academy of Child and Adolescent Psychiatry (AACAP) in 1989. The American Academy of Child and Adolescent Psychiatry's mission is to promote the healthy development of children, adolescents, and families through advocacy, education, and research.

== Publications ==
Since 1962, the AACAP has published its monthly journal, Journal of the American Academy of Child and Adolescent Psychiatry (JAACAP).

=== Controversy ===
There have been concerns about industry-sponsored clinical trials published in the journal. JAACAP editors have repeatedly declined to retract the journal's 2001 article on study 329, a clinical trial examining paroxetine and teenagers. The trial was sponsored by, and ghostwritten on behalf of SmithKline Beecham (now GlaxoSmithKline), and is widely regarded as having downplayed the trial's negative results.
