= Eugenio M. Rothe =

Dominican psychiatrist

- Born: Dominican Republic
- Education: Pontificia Universidad Católica Madre y Maestra University of Miami; Harvard University; Florida Psychoanalytic Institute
- Known for: Migrant and refugee mental health Medical professionalism education Trauma studies
- Awards: American Psychiatric Association Simón Bolivar Award; American Psychiatric Association Bruno Lima Award; American Academy of Child and Adolescent Psychiatry Jeanne Spurlock Award; Alpha Omega Alpha Edward B. Harris Award; Distinguished Life Fellow, American Academy of Child and Adolescent Psychiatry
- Scientific career
- Fields: Psychiatry, Child and adolescent psychiatry, Forensic psychiatry, Psychoanalysis, Cultural psychiatry
- Workplaces: Florida International University

Eugenio M. Rothe is a Latin-American psychiatrist, psychoanalyst, and academic. He is a Professor of Psychiatry and Behavioral Health at Florida International University's (FIU) Herbert Wertheim College of Medicine, where he is also a founding faculty member.

Rothe is an internationally recognized expert on the mental health of immigrant and refugee populations. He is the co-author of the book Immigration, Cultural Identity, and Mental Health (2020) and a co-editor of The WASP Textbook on Social Psychiatry (2023), both published by Oxford University Press. He is triple-board certified in General Psychiatry, Child and Adolescent Psychiatry, and Forensic Psychiatry.

Rothe has held numerous national leadership positions, including serving as president of the American Association for Social Psychiatry and as president-elect of the American Academy of Psychodynamic Psychiatry and Psychoanalysis.

== Education and training ==
Rothe earned his Doctor of Medicine (M.D.) from the Pontificia Universidad Católica Madre y Maestra in the Dominican Republic. He completed an internship at medical and surgical internships at the University of Puerto Rico San Juan, Puerto Rico.

He then moved to the United States for his postgraduate training at the University of Miami/Jackson Memorial Hospital, where he completed a residency in General Psychiatry. During his residency, he received the Juan Balloveras Memorial Award as the most outstanding incoming resident and was later appointed Chief Resident. He subsequently completed a fellowship in Child and Adolescent Psychiatry at Harvard University's Cambridge Hospital. Rothe also graduated from the Florida Psychoanalytic Institute with advanced training in adult psychoanalysis.

He is triple-board certified in General Psychiatry, Child and Adolescent Psychiatry, and Forensic Psychiatry.

== Career ==
=== Florida International University ===
Rothe is a founding faculty member of the FIU Herbert Wertheim College of Medicine (HWCOM), where he is a Professor in the Department of Psychiatry and Behavioral Health. He holds several interdisciplinary appointments at FIU, including Courtesy Professor in the Robert Stempel College of Public Health and Social Work, and adjunct professorships at the Cuban Research Institute and the Kimberly Green Latin American and Caribbean Center.

In his educational leadership roles, Rothe serves as the Assistant Clerkship Director for the medical student psychiatry rotations. He founded and directs the Medical Professionalism Course, a curriculum designed to prepare students for the psychological and emotional demands of medical practice. He also teaches psychotherapy and human development seminars to psychiatry residents and supervises trainees in the Child and Adolescent Psychiatry Fellowship Program.

=== Clinical practice ===
In addition to his academic work, Rothe maintains a private practice in Coral Gables, Florida, specializing in psychotherapy and psychoanalysis for adults, adolescents, and children.

== Scholarly work and research ==
Rothe has authored over 95 scientific publications, focusing primarily on cultural psychiatry, refugee trauma, and medical education. He has served on the editorial boards of several scientific journals, including as Associate Editor for the American Journal of Orthopsychiatry and Adolescent Psychiatry.

=== Cultural psychiatry and immigrant mental health ===
Rothe's research examines the bio-psycho-social experience of migration, focusing on concepts such as acculturation, inter-culturation, and bicultural stress. He has documented pre- and post-migration stressors, including trauma, poverty, and discrimination, as key risk factors for this population. His work emphasizes the use of the personal narrative in psychotherapy to heal the "trauma of loss and dislocation" associated with the immigrant experience.

=== Guantanamo Refugee Camp Study ===
During the 1994 Cuban rafter crisis, Rothe conducted clinical work with Cuban refugee children detained at the U.S. Naval Base at]. This experience led to his 2002 study, "Posttraumatic Stress Disorder Among Cuban Children and Adolescents After Release From a Refugee Camp," published in Psychiatric Services.

The study assessed 87 children who had been confined in the camps for up to eight months. It found that a majority reported moderate to severe symptoms of], with the most common symptom clusters being avoidance (67%), regressive behaviors such as bedwetting (64%), and re-experiencing traumatic events (60%). A key finding was a "dose-effect relationship," where the severity of PTSD symptoms correlated directly with the number of stressors a child was exposed to. The study concluded that the children's symptoms were largely subjective and often went unnoticed by adults, highlighting a critical gap in the assessment of refugee youth. Based on this work, Rothe developed a psychotherapy model for treating refugee children during the "peri-traumatic period"—the time between departure and arrival in a sheltering country—to mitigate long-term mental health consequences.

=== Medical professionalism curriculum ===
At FIU, Rothe founded and directs the Medical Professionalism Course, a curriculum that uses psychodynamic principles to teach core competencies such as self-reflection and conflict resolution. The course focuses on the "art of medicine," preparing students for the psychological stressors of the profession to mitigate burnout. In 2019, the curriculum won the Alpha Omega Alpha Honor Medical Society’s Professionalism Award, which recognizes best practices in medical professionalism education.

=== Major books ===
Rothe's 2020 book, Immigration, Cultural Identity, and Mental Health, co-authored with Andres J. Pumariega, provides a comprehensive framework for understanding the experience of immigrants in the United States. It explores the psychodynamics of migration, acculturation, race, and identity, and includes a chapter that uses statistical data to dispel myths about immigrant criminality. Academic reviews have described the book as "comprehensive, readable, and authoritative" and an "essential tool" for professionals in the social sciences.

As a co-editor of the 2023 WASP Textbook on Social Psychiatry, an international textbook from the World Association of Social Psychiatry (WASP), Rothe helped assemble contributions from over 50 experts from 13 countries. The book addresses a wide spectrum of social determinants of mental health, including culture, gender, and the impact of contemporary global issues.

== Major publications ==
- Rothe, Eugenio M.; Pumariega, Andres J. (2020). Immigration, Cultural Identity, and Mental Health: Psycho-social Implications of the Reshaping of America. Oxford University Press. ISBN 978-0190661700.
- Gogineni, Rama Rao; Pumariega, Andres J.; Kallivayalil, Roy; Kastrup, Marianne; Rothe, Eugenio M., eds. (2023). The WASP Textbook on Social Psychiatry: Historical, Developmental, Cultural, and Clinical Perspectives. Oxford University Press. ISBN 978-0197521397.

== Leadership and recognition ==
Rothe has held numerous leadership roles in national psychiatric organizations. He is the president-elect (2024–2026) of the American Academy of Psychodynamic Psychiatry and Psychoanalysis (AAPDPP) and a past president (2019–2021) of the American Association for Social Psychiatry. He has also served as president of the South Florida Council of Child and Adolescent Psychiatry and as chair of the Scientific Program Committee for the AAPDPP.

He has been consistently included in the "Best Doctors in America" list since 2015. His work has been featured in media outlets including Psychiatric News, the Miami Herald, and the Guantánamo Public Memory Project.

=== Selected awards and honors ===
- Distinguished Life Fellow, American Academy of Child and Adolescent Psychiatry (AACAP)
- Distinguished Fellow, American Psychiatric Association (APA)
- Simón Bolivar Award, American Psychiatric Association
- Bruno Lima Award for Outstanding Contributions to the Care of Victims of Disasters, American Psychiatric Association
- Jeanne Spurlock Award for Diversity and Culture, American Academy of Child and Adolescent Psychiatry
- Agnes Purcell McGavin Award for Prevention, American Psychiatric Association
- Edward B. Harris Award for Medical Professionalism, Alpha Omega Alpha Honor Medical Society
- Irma Bland Award for Excellence in Teaching Residents, American Psychiatric Association
- Nancy C. Roeske Award for Excellence in Teaching Medical Students, American Psychiatric Association
- Lifetime Achievement Award, American Society of Hispanic Psychiatry
- FIU Top Scholar Award, Florida International University

== See also ==
- Cultural psychiatry
- Acculturation
- Post-traumatic stress disorder
- Psychodynamics
