= Leemon McHenry =

American bioethicist and academic (born 1956)

- Born: 1956 (age 69–70); North Carolina, U.S.
- Occupation: Philosopher

Academic background
- Education: University of Edinburgh

Academic work
- School or tradition: Speculative philosophy Process philosophy
- Notable works: The Event Universe, The Illusion of Evidence-Based Medicine

Leemon McHenry is a bioethicist and emeritus professor of Philosophy at California State University, Northridge, in the United States. McHenry joined the faculty of California State University, Northridge in 1997. He has held visiting research positions at Johns Hopkins University, UCLA and at the Institute for Advanced Studies in the Humanities in the University of Edinburgh. His research interests center on medical ethics, metaphysics, and philosophy of science.

== Education ==
McHenry received his doctorate from the University of Edinburgh, in Scotland, where he was Vans Dunlop Scholar in Logic and Metaphysics supervised by Professor Timothy L. S. Sprigge. He defended the thesis Experience and relations in the metaphysics of A.N. Whitehead and F.H. Bradley, in 1984 by external examiner, Dorothy Emmet of the University of Cambridge.

== Writings ==
Much of McHenry's philosophical work focuses on the philosophy of Alfred North Whitehead and process studies. He has devoted attention to Whitehead's attempt to construct a unified general theory from the revolutionary developments in modern physics. McHenry has argued that Whitehead's event ontology is a more adequate basis for achieving this unification than a traditional substance metaphysics. His papers on this subject and a book, The Event Universe, investigate the influence of Maxwell's electromagnetic field and Einstein's special theory of relativity on the ontology of events. In this manner he has defended the naturalized and speculative approach to metaphysics as opposed to analytical and linguistic methods that arose in the 20th century.

In medical ethics he has focused attention on scientific integrity in clinical research. He has criticized the corporate takeover of medicine and the corrupting influence of the pharmaceutical industry on medicine. This includes dubious claims about chemical imbalance as a marketing ploy for selling antidepressants, direct-to-consumer advertising of pharmaceuticals, industry-sponsored clinical research, and ghostwriting for medical journals. As an example of the latter, he has written articles about GlaxoSmithKline's study 329 on paroxetine and demanded that the ghostwritten article about the trial results should be retracted by the journal that published it in 2001. In a broader realm, he has argued that the industry-academic partnerships have worsened university research, created increased opportunities for scientific misconduct, and failed to protect academic freedom. This work falls within a new area of inquiry, agnotology, understood as the study of willful acts to spread confusion and deceit.

McHenry's work has been translated into Italian, French, Spanish, German, Croatian, and Polish.

In 2007 he became the literary executor to the late Professor Timothy Sprigge.

== Books ==
- 1992, Whitehead and Bradley: A Comparative Analysis, SUNY Series in Systematic Philosophy, Albany: State University of New York Press.
- 1993, Reflections on Philosophy: Introductory Essays, ed. with Frederick Adams, New York: St. Martins Press. (Second edition, 2003, edited with Takashi Yagisawa, New York: Longman)
- 2002, British Philosophers: 1800-2000, ed. with P. Dematteis and P. Fosl, London and Detroit: Gale.
- 2003, American Philosophers Before 1950, ed. with P. Dematteis, Volume, 270, London and Detroit: Gale.
- 2003, American Philosophers, 1950-2000, ed. with P. Dematteis, Volume 279, London and Detroit: Gale.
- 2007, Consciousness, Reality and Value: Essays in Honour of T. L. S. Sprigge, ed. with Pierfrancesco Basile, Frankfurt: Ontos Verlag.
- 2009, Science and the Pursuit of Wisdom: Studies in the Philosophy of Nicholas Maxwell, (ed), Frankfurt: Ontos Verlag.
- 2010, The Importance of Subjectivity: Selected Essays in Metaphysics and Ethics, T. L. S. Sprigge, (ed), Oxford: Oxford University Press.
- 2011, Philosophy: The Classic Readings, (ed) San Diego, CA: University Readers.
- 2015, The Event Universe: The Revisionary Metaphysics of Alfred North Whitehead, Edinburgh University Press.
- 2020,The Illusion of Evidence-Based Medicine: Exposing the Crisis of Credibility in Clinical Research, with Jon Jureidini, Adelaide: Wakefield Press.

== Selected Articles ==
Philosophy and Science

- "Descriptive and Revisionary Theories of Events," Process Studies, Special issue on Process and Analytical Philosophy, 25, 1996, pp. 90–103;
- "Quine and Whitehead: Ontology and Methodology," Process Studies, 1997; 26, pp. 2–12. (Response: W. V. Quine, "Response to Leemon McHenry" Process Studies, 26, pp. 13–14; reprinted in Quine in Dialogue, ed by Dagfinn Føllesdal and Douglas Quine, Harvard University Press, 2008, pp. 257–58.
- "Sprigge's Ontology of Consciousness," The Metaphysics of Consciousness, Supplement issue of Philosophy: The Journal of the Royal Institute of Philosophy, 2010; 85, pp. 5–20.
- "The Multiverse Conjecture: Whitehead's Cosmic Epochs and Contemporary Cosmology," Process Studies, 40.1, 2011, pp. 5–25.
- "Whitehead's Multiverse," Journal of Cosmology, 2012; 20, pp. 8702–8706.
- "Analytical Critiques of Whitehead's Metaphysics," with George W. Shields, Journal of the American Philosophical Association, 2/3, 2016, pp. 483–503.
- "Whitehead and Russell on the Analysis of Matter," The Review of Metaphysics, 2017; 71, pp. 321–342.
- "Modern Physics and the Ontology of Events," 21st-Century Philosophy of Events: Beyond the Analytic / Continental Divide, edited by James Bahoh, Sergio Genovese, and Marta Cassina, Edinburgh: Edinburgh University Press, 2025, pp. 245–264.
- "On the Prospects for a Unified Theory of Physics: A Belated Response to Stephen Hawking,” Science and Philosophy, 13/2, 2025. pp. 174–189.

Bioethics and Medicine

- "On the Origin of Great Ideas: Science in the Age of Big Pharma," Hasting Center Report, 35, no. 6, 2005, pp. 17–19.
- "Ethical Issues in Psychopharmacology," Journal of Medical Ethics, 2006; 32, pp. 405–410.
- "Clinical Trials and Drug Promotion: Selective Reporting of Study 329," with Jon Jureidini and Peter Mansfield, International Journal of Risk and Safety in Medicine, 2008; 20, pp. 73–81.
- "Of Sophists and Spin-Doctors: Industry-Sponsored Ghostwriting and the Crisis of Academic Medicine," Mens Sana Monographs, 8, 2010, pp. 129–145.
- "Blood Money: Bayer's Inventory of HIV Contaminated Blood Products and Third World Hemophiliacs," with Mellad M. Khoshnood, Accountability in Research, 2014; 21, pp. 389–400.
- "The Citalopram CIT-MD-18 Pediatric Depression Trial: A Deconstruction of Medical Ghostwriting, Data Manipulation and Academic Malfeasance," with Jay D. Amsterdam and Jon N. Jureidini, International Journal of Risk & Safety in Medicine, 2016; 28, pp. 33–43.
- "The Monsanto Papers: Poisoning the Scientific Well," International Journal of Risk & Safety in Medicine, 29, (3–4), 2018, pp. 193–205.
- "The Illusion of Evidence Based Medicine," with Jon Jureidini, British Medical Journal (BMJ), 376, 2022, pp. 702–03.
- "A Reactogenic 'Placebo' and the Ethics of Informed Consent in the Gardasil HPV Vaccine Clinical Trials: A Case Study from Denmark," with Lucija Tomljenovic, International Journal of Risk and Safety in Medicine, 2024; 35:2, pp. 159–180.

== Appearances ==
Commonwealth Club of California, The Illusion of Evidence Based Medicine: Distorted Science in the Age of Big Pharma.

National Public Radio (NPR), The People's Pharmacy: The People's Perspective on Medicine. Is Evidence Based Medicine an illusion?

== See also ==
- American philosophy
- List of American philosophers
- George Austin McHenry
