= Catherine Angell Sohn =

American businessperson

Catherine Angell Sohn, Pharm.D.
- Education: University of California, San Francisco; University of Pennsylvania Wharton School
- Scientific career
- Workplaces: GlaxoSmithKline

Catherine Angell Sohn is an American businesswoman, pharmacist, and consultant specializing in therapeutic commercialization and licensing.

== Education ==
Sohn studied biochemistry at the University of California, Davis and later studied clinical pharmacy at the University of California, San Francisco, receiving her Pharm.D. in 1977. She completed a Professional Development certificate at the Wharton School in 2006.

== Career ==
Sohn spent nearly 30 years working in various roles within GlaxoSmithKline, from 1982 to her retirement in 2010. Her career included stints in medical affairs, strategic product development, product marketing, development of the U.S. Vaccines division, launch of the CNS-active therapeutic Paxil, mergers and acquisitions, and finally a Senior Vice President in the Consumer Health division.

Sohn serves on the Boards of Directors for Jazz Pharmaceuticals, Rubius Therapeutics, Axcella Health and Landec Corporation. She is an adjunct professor in Clinical Pharmacy at UCSF.

== Awards ==
- 2016 - PharmaVoice - "100 Most Inspiring People in the Life Sciences Industry"
- 2009 - Frank Barnes Mentor Award, Licensing Executive Society
- 2003 - Healthcare Businesswoman's Association "Woman of the Year"
- 2000 - UCSF Pharmacy School Distinguished Alumnus of the Year
