= Martin Keller =

Martin Keller may refer to:

- Martin Keller (psychiatrist), American psychiatrist
- Martin Keller (athlete) (born 1986), German track and field sprint athlete
- Martin Keller (microbiologist), German microbiologist, Director of the National Renewable Energy Laboratory
