= Frederick Adams (philosopher) =

American philosopher

Education
- Education: University of Wisconsin-Madison (PhD), Southern Illinois University-Edwardsville (BA, MA)

Philosophical work
- Era: 21st-century philosophy
- Region: Western philosophy
- Institutions: University of Delaware
- Main interests: philosophical psychology

Frederick Adams is an American philosopher who is Professor of Linguistics & Cognitive Science and Professor of Philosophy at the University of Delaware. He is known for his works on philosophical psychology.

== Books ==
- Cognitive Science: Recent Advances and Recurring Problems, ed. with Joao Kogler and Osvaldo Pessoa Junior, Vernon Press. 2017.
- An Introduction to the Philosophy of Psychology, with Daniel Weiskopf, Cambridge University Press. 2015.
- The Bounds of Cognition, with Kenneth Aizawa, Wiley & Sons, 2011.
- Reflections on Philosophy: Introductory Essays, ed. with Leemon McHenry, New York: St. Martins Press. 1993. (Second edition, 2003, edited with Takaski Yagisawa, New York: Longman)
