= Martin Keller (psychiatrist) =

American psychiatrist

Martin Keller is an American psychiatrist. He is Professor Emeritus of Psychiatry and Human Behavior at Brown Medical School in Providence, Rhode Island.

== Career history ==
Keller earned his BA in psychology at Dartmouth College; his MD at Weill Cornell Medical College; internship at Bellevue Hospital Center; and residency in psychiatry at the Massachusetts General Hospital.

He has made contributions to standardized methods for assessing time to recovery, relapse, recurrence, and chronicity of episodes of mood disorders and anxiety disorders. One example is the Longitudinal Interval Follow-Up Evaluation (LIFE), which prospectively assesses psychopathology over time and has been used in over 1,000 research programs internationally.

The recipient of over 25 NIMH grants, his studies lead to a paradigm shift in understanding that mood and anxiety disorders are not short-lived episodes, but are primarily chronic, recurrent and disabling illnesses, expressed across the lifespan; which provided evidence to the Surgeon Generals report that depression is one of the more devastating public health problems.

Keller discovered that about 25% of major depressive episodes were superimposed on dysthymia, a condition labeled “double depression” which is more pernicious, chronic and disabling than most other forms of MDD. He first identified the serious undertreatment of MDD in 1982, and later organized a consensus conference concluding that less than 10% of patients with MDD receive adequate treatment. He applied these findings and methodologies to empirically develop new short term and maintenance treatment strategies for bipolar disorder, recurrent MDD and chronic MDD; with medication and psychotherapy alone, and in combination.

== Efficacy of paroxetine ==
Keller was listed as the lead author in 2001 of a controversial paper on study 329, a clinical trial funded by SmithKline Beecham, known since 2000 as GlaxoSmithKline. The study examined the effects of paroxetine (Paxil, Seroxat) on adolescent depression. Keller's article concluded that paroxetine was "generally well tolerated and effective for major depression in adolescents." In fact, study 329 indicated otherwise for both efficacy and safety in treating teenagers, showing an increase in suicidality and emotional lability. The results were manipulated to downplay the significance of this finding. It was later found that the article had been ghostwritten by Scientific Therapeutics Information on behalf of the drug company.

Peter C. Gøtzsche (2015). Deadly Psychiatry and Organised Denial. People's Press writes that he was receiving hundreds of thousands of dollars for research that was not disclosed and other facts.
