= UCSF Library =

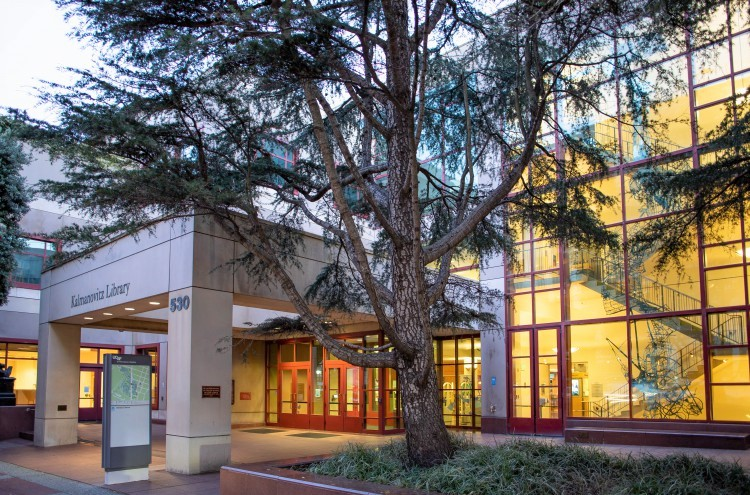
- UCSF's Kalmanovitz Library
- Location: San Francisco, United States
- Type: Academic library
- Established: 1990

Collection
- Size: 1,129,336
- Criteria for collection: Health Sciences

Access and use
- Population served: 489,348

Other information
- Director: Christopher Shaffer
- Website: https://www.library.ucsf.edu

The UCSF Library is the library of the University of California, San Francisco. It is one of the world's foremost libraries in the health sciences.

== Facilities ==
The main branch (Kalmanovitz Library) is located at the Parnassus campus, with secondary locations at the Mission Bay campus in the Rutter Center and Mission Hall. Additionally, the library is affiliated with the ZSFG Library at the Zuckerberg San Francisco General Hospital, the Fishbon Memorial Library at UCSF Medical Center, the UCSF Fresno Medical Library at UCSF Fresno Medical Education Program, the UCSF Patient Health Library at Mount Zion Medical Center, the Medical Library at Benioff Children's Hospital Oakland, and the Veterans Affairs Medical Center Library at the San Francisco VA Medical Center.

=== Art ===
The main branch hosts artwork by Hiroshige, Georges Mathieu, Helaman Ferguson, Fred Reichman, R.C. Gorman, Bill Woodrow, Robert Cremean, and Sarah Sze.

== Archives and Special Collections ==
The UCSF Archives and Special Collections is part of the UCSF Library located on the Parnassus campus in San Francisco, California. The UCSF archives serve as the official repository for the preservation of selected records, printed and born-digital materials, and realia generated by or about UCSF, including the School of Medicine, School of Nursing, School of Pharmacy, School of Dentistry, the Graduate Division, and the UCSF Medical Center. The archives also include rare and unique materials that support research and teaching in the history of the health sciences.

The institutional archives were officially established in 1963 by UC President Clark Kerr. He mandated the creation of both a records management system and an archives program at UCSF. The medical history rare book collection began in the 1930s, before the establishment of the institutional archives.

=== Holdings ===
Significant rare book collections and archival holdings include:

- Pre-20th century works related to the health sciences published in the San Francisco Bay Area or by California authors, includes several early medical and dental journals and San Francisco Department of Public Health reports
- Homeopathy archival papers and works from the library of the Hahnemann Medical College of the Pacific
- Speck collection on cholera, includes pamphlets and reports on cholera epidemics in the US and Europe
- Ralph H. Kellogg collection for high-altitude physiology
- Incunabula regarding the health sciences and early printed work (16th to 19th century)
- The East Asian Collection, includes works related to the history of Western medicine in Japan and pharmacy and medical schools in Japan from the middle of the 16th century to 1900
- Japanese Woodblock Print Collection
- HIV/AIDS epidemic material from the UCSF AIDS History Project
- Tobacco Control Archives
- Biotechnology Archives, including the collections of J. Michael Bishop, Choh Hao Li, the Radiologic Imaging Laboratory, and Harold Varmus
- Digitized collection of UCSF university publications, yearbooks, pamphlets, and books dating from the 16th century through the 2000s accessible through HathiTrust

== Industry Documents Library ==
The UCSF Industry Documents Library (IDL) is a digital archive of internal tobacco, drug, food, chemical, and fossil fuel corporate documents, acquired largely through litigation, which illustrate industry efforts to influence policies and regulations meant to protect public health. The mission of the UCSF Industry Documents Library is to "identify, collect, curate, preserve, and make freely accessible internal documents created by industries and their partners which have an impact on public health, for the benefit and use of researchers, clinicians, educators, students, policymakers, media, and the general public at UCSF and internationally". The collection includes the Truth Tobacco Industry Documents and the Drug Industry Document Archive.
