= Daniel Weiskopf =

American philosopher

Education
- Education: Washington University in St. Louis (PhD), Brown University (MA), University of California at Berkeley (BA)
- Thesis: A Defense of Conceptual Pluralism (2003)

Philosophical work
- Era: 21st-century philosophy
- Region: Western philosophy
- Institutions: Georgia State University
- Main interests: philosophy of psychology, philosophy of neuroscience, philosophy of science
- Website: https://wordsandobjects.net/

Daniel Weiskopf is an American philosopher and Professor of Philosophy at Georgia State University. He is known for his works on the nature of representation in mind, science, and art.

== Early life and education ==
Daniel Weiskopf was born in Cleveland, Ohio, and raised in Rockford, Illinois. He earned a Bachelor of Arts degree in philosophy from the University of California, Berkeley in 1996. He went on to receive a Master of Arts in philosophy from Brown University in 1999. Weiskopf completed his Ph.D. in Philosophy–Neuroscience–Psychology at Washington University in St. Louis in 2003.

== Books ==
- An Introduction to the Philosophy of Psychology, with Frederick Adams, Cambridge University Press. 2015.
