= Truth Tobacco Industry Documents =

Tobacco industry document archive

The University of California, San Francisco (UCSF) Truth Tobacco Industry Documents (formerly known as Legacy Tobacco Documents Library) is a digital archive of tobacco industry documents, funded by Truth Initiative and created and maintained by the University of California, San Francisco. The Library is a part of the larger UCSF Industry Documents Library which also includes the Opioid Industry Documents Archive (OIDA), Drug Industry Document Archive, Food Industry Documents Archive, Chemical Industry Documents Archive, and the Fossil Fuel Industry Documents Archive. TTID contains over 19 million documents produced by major tobacco companies and organizations, many of them internal strategic memoranda made public as a consequence of major lawsuit settlement agreements such as the Tobacco Master Settlement Agreement and the Juul Labs settlements. The documents deal with the tobacco industry's advertising, manufacturing, marketing, sales, and scientific research activities for the last century. Researchers, journalists, students, and activists interested in tobacco control issues and public health policies use the Library extensively to investigate tobacco industry strategies. Research in this archive revealed the tobacco industry playbook and its parallels with techniques linked to climate change denial.

== History ==
In 1994, the attorneys general of four states—Mississippi, Minnesota, Florida, and Texas—separately filed lawsuits against the tobacco industry in an effort to secure reimbursement for health care expenditures arising from tobacco-related illnesses. During the course of this litigation, 42 other states joined in similar legal actions. The library of the University of California San Francisco (UCSF) had started digitizing and hosting internal tobacco industry documents in 1995 as part of wider efforts to make public what the tobacco industry had done and helped drive the turning of public sentiment and litigation against the tobacco companies.

In 1998, a Master Settlement Agreement (MSA) was signed by the attorneys general of 46 states and the nation's five major tobacco companies: Philip Morris, R. J. Reynolds, Lorillard, Brown & Williamson, and the American Tobacco Company. The MSA effectively settled the outstanding lawsuits by requiring yearly payments by the tobacco companies to the states and placing restrictions on the advertising and marketing of tobacco products.

As part of the Master Settlement Agreement, the U.S. tobacco companies were ordered to release the internal documents produced for the case for public access in both a physical depository in Minnesota and on their own document websites. The international tobacco company, British American Tobacco, was not ordered to provide a document website but they were required to deposit documents into a depository in Guildford, England. The National Association of Attorneys General (NAAG) provides oversight and enforcement of this operation. In 2006, U.S. District Judge Gladys Kessler ruled in a separate case that the nation's top tobacco companies violated racketeering laws, misleading the public for years about the health hazards of smoking. These companies were convicted under the Racketeer Influenced and Corrupt Organizations Act (RICO Act). Philip Morris and R.J. Reynolds filed an appeal but Judge Kessler's ruling was upheld. As a result of this case and its appeals, the companies are now obliged to make available any documents produced for litigation on smoking and health until 2021.

The MSA provisions also created and funded the American Legacy Foundation, subsequently renamed the Truth Initiative, an anti-smoking advocacy group, and in the early 2000s the foundation gave approximately $10 million of the settlement funds it managed to UCSF to formalize the collection it already hosted into the Legacy Tobacco Documents Library and to expand their efforts. In 2002, NAAG gave the UCSF Library a large number of document index records and images to further develop the Library. Documents are continually added to the MSA collections through the use of spidering (also known as "web crawling") applications that identify and download index records and document images directly from the tobacco companies' websites.

== Collections ==
The Library collects and maintains the internal documents of the tobacco companies and their trade organizations that were a party to the Master Settlement Agreement as well as documents from other litigation or companies not party to the settlement. Among the documents are more than 8,000 tobacco industry video and audio tapes including recordings of focus groups, internal corporate meetings, depositions of tobacco industry employees, government hearings, corporate communications, and commercials. Many of the acquired tapes are available for viewing or listening on the Internet Archive at the UCSF Tobacco Industry Videos Collection.

A still from the R. J. Reynolds commercial for Camel cigarettes.

The Multimedia Collection in the Legacy Tobacco Documents Library at the University of California, San Francisco contains more than 7,500 tobacco industry video and audio tapes including recordings of focus groups, internal corporate meetings, depositions of tobacco industry employees, Congressional hearings, corporate communications, and commercials. Funded by a grant from the California Tobacco Related Disease Research Program (TRDRP), UCSF Library staff collects multimedia materials housed at the Minnesota Tobacco Documents Depository, Roswell Park Comprehensive Cancer Center, and Guildford depository in the UK.

Many of these videos and audio recordings have been uploaded to the UCSF Tobacco Industry Videos and Audio Recordings Collection at the Internet Archive and are available to researchers and the general public.

=== MSA-mandated collections ===
- American Tobacco
- Brown & Williamson
- Council for Tobacco Research
- Lorillard
- Philip Morris
- R. J. Reynolds
- Tobacco Institute

=== Additional collections include... ===
Juul Labs Collection
This collection contains documents related to the e-cigarette brand JUUL and come from a number of sources including the Multistate Juul Labs Settlement and the State of North Carolina v. Juul Labs, Inc.

British American Tobacco
This collection was originally maintained in a separate digital archive known as the British American Tobacco Documents Archive (BATDA). In July 2008, the BAT documents were added to the Library in an effort to provide researchers, as well as the general public, with unhindered access to the entire body of internal tobacco industry documents. The British American Tobacco (BAT) collection contains close to 7 million pages of internal corporate documents related to British American Tobacco Company (BATCo) and its parent, BAT Industries PLC.
U.S. Smokeless Tobacco Company
The U.S. Smokeless Tobacco collection contains internal corporate documents from the U.S. Smokeless Tobacco Company, the largest manufacturer of moist snuff smokeless tobacco products in the U.S. and producer of the well-known brands, Skoal and Copenhagen.
UCSF Brown & Williamson
Thousands of pages of Brown & Williamson Tobacco Corporation documents were donated unsolicited to the UCSF Tobacco Control Archives in 1994. These documents consist primarily of scientific studies on the addictive nature of nicotine and other health effects of tobacco smoke. Brown & Williamson sought to permanently remove the disputed material from the Library with a suit filed in San Francisco Superior Court. The University of California argued that all of the documents were in the public domain and should be available to scholars and other interested parties. In May 1995, the Superior Court ruled that these documents should be made available for public review. Brown & Williamson appealed that decision, but the California Supreme Court rejected the company's appeal allowing UCSF to release the documents.
Mangini ("Joe Camel") Documents
This collection consists of internal documents from the R. J. Reynolds Tobacco Company, produced as part of the discovery process in the 1994 civil case Mangini v. R. J. Reynolds Tobacco Company. A majority of the documents span the period 1970s–1990s, when R. J. Reynolds Tobacco developed the Joe Camel advertising campaign.
Pollay Advertising Collection
A collection of over 8,500 examples of cigarette print advertising compiled and given to the Library by Richard W. Pollay, Professor Emeritus at Sauder Business School, University of British Columbia.
Liggett & Myers
This collection contains approximately 400,000 pages of Liggett & Myers (L&M) internal documents. In 1997, Liggett & Myers, the smallest of the five major tobacco companies, became the first to settle lawsuits in 22 states and to help state prosecutors litigate against the nation's biggest cigarette manufacturers by providing evidence of industry strategies and tactics. Because of their early compliance with prosecutors, L&M was not included in the Master Settlement Agreement stipulation for creation of company document websites, meaning these documents exist nowhere else in electronic format.
Tobacco Depositions and Trial Testimony Archive (DATTA)
DATTA contains transcripts from tobacco-related litigation, collected from a variety of sources by the Center for Tobacco Use Prevention and Research in Okemos, Michigan.
Canadian Tobacco Trials
The Canadian Tobacco Trials collection consists of court records (transcripts, depositions, exhibits) from four major national Canadian trials: the 1989 Tobacco Products Control Act (TPCA) Trial, the 1997 Tobacco Act Trial, and the Blais-LeTourneau trials concluding in 2015.
