= Industry Documents Library =

The UCSF Industry Documents Library (IDL) is a digital archive of internal tobacco, opioid, drug, food, chemical and fossil fuel corporate documents, acquired largely through litigation, which illustrate industry efforts to influence policies and regulations meant to protect public health. Created and maintained by the UCSF Library, the mission of the UCSF Industry Documents Library is to "identify, collect, curate, preserve, and make freely accessible internal documents created by industries and their partners which have an impact on public health, for the benefit and use of researchers, clinicians, educators, students, policymakers, media, and the general public at UCSF and internationally".

== Collections ==
The IDL includes the following archives:

- the Truth Tobacco Industry Documents
- the Opioid Industry Documents Archive
- the Drug Industry Documents Archive
- the Food Industry Documents Archive
- the Chemical Industry Documents Archive
- the Fossil Fuel Industry Document Archive
