= Healthy Skepticism =

Healthy Skepticism Inc
- Founded: 1983
- Founder: Peter R. Mansfield
- Website: http://www.healthyskepticism.org

Healthy Skepticism Inc is an international non-profit organisation whose main aim is to "improve health by reducing harm from misleading drug promotion".

Healthy Skepticism was founded in 1983 with the name Medical Lobby for Appropriate Marketing (MaLAM). It was begun by an Australian medical student, Peter Mansfield, who had the idea for the organisation during his final year elective in Bangladesh in 1982. MaLAM initially focused on campaigning against questionable marketing practices in developing countries. These included the promotion of appetite stimulants, tonics and anabolic steroids to parents of malnourished children. MaLAM was modelled on Amnesty International and wrote open letters to the international headquarters of pharmaceutical companies questioning them about specific advertisements. MaLAM letters were signed by supporters around the world and contributed to many improvements in drug marketing, several products being removed from the market and many advertising claims changed. MaLAM reported more than 450 alleged violations of the voluntary code of conduct of the drug industry in 1987, and also questioned drug advertisements in Australia during 1993 to 1997 with funding from the Australian federal government.

In 2001, the organisation's name was changed to Healthy Skepticism and its work widened to include research, education and advocacy about misleading drug promotion in all countries. It has concentrated recently on raising awareness amongst health professionals of the influence that marketing techniques have on their decisions, and the psychological factors which make them vulnerable to that influence.
