= Medical ghostwriter =

People who write medical texts for others

Medical ghostwriters are contracted by pharmaceutical companies and medical-device manufacturers to produce apparently independent manuscripts for peer-reviewed journals, conference presentations and other communications. Physicians and other scientists are paid to attach their names to the manuscripts as though they had authored them. The named authors may have had little or no involvement in the research or writing process.

== Definitions and rules ==
The American Medical Writers Association speaks about the topic as follows:

"Ghost authoring" refers to making substantial contributions without being identified as an author. "Guest authoring" refers to being named as an author without having made substantial contributions. "Ghostwriting" refers to assisting in presenting the author's work without being acknowledged. The term "ghostwriting" is often used to encompass all three of these practices.

The rules for authorship and contribution of the International Committee of Medical Journal Editors (ICMJE, informally known as "the Vancouver Group" from the locale of the group's first meeting, Vancouver, British Columbia, Canada) are a single, universally-respected set of guidelines for describing authorship of and contribution to professional medical publications. The document "International Committee of Medical Journal Editors: Defining the Role of Authors and Contributors" is considered the definitive statement of ethical requirements for how authorship in medical journal articles (the prime forum for medical professional publication) and the degree to which a given writer is deemed to have contributed to the content of a medical journal article are determined. Compliance with the International Committee of Medical Journal Editors' Uniform Requirements for Manuscripts Submitted to Biomedical Journals is voluntary. A list of medical journals which have stated that they follow the Uniform Requirements for Manuscripts Submitted to Biomedical Journals is maintained by the International Committee of Medical Journal Editors.

How closely individual medical journals and authors of medical journal articles comply with ICMJE guidelines is a largely self-policed matter. The ICMJE document "Uniform Requirements for Manuscripts Submitted to Biomedical Journals: Publishing and Editorial Issues Related to Publication in Biomedical Journals: Corrections, Retractions and "Expressions of Concern" is the section of the ICMJE Uniform Requirements laying out guidelines for how potential or actual scientific error and scientific fraud ought to be dealt with. It refers readers to the relevant guidelines from the Committee for Publication Ethics (COPE) - specifically COPE's flowcharts outlining a systematic approach toward scientific error and possible fraud.

== Criticism ==
Medical ghostwriting has been criticized by a variety of professional organizations representing the drug industry, publishers, and medical societies, and it may violate American laws prohibiting off-label promotion by drug manufacturers as well as anti-kickback provisions within the statutes governing Medicare. Recently, it has attracted scrutiny from the lay press lawmakers the Institute of Medicine, and the National Institutes of Health. as well. It is permitted at some institutions, including the University of Washington School of Medicine, while it is prohibited and considered a particularly pernicious form of plagiarism at others, such as Tufts University School of Medicine and the University of Pennsylvania School of Medicine.

Scandals involving prominent physicians researchers have been reported at over a dozen universities in the United States, however, there have been no reports of any professors being disciplined. Professor Trudo Lemmens of the University of Toronto Faculty of Law argues that ghostwritten papers help protect companies when they are sued in court.

Perhaps the most pernicious practice in ghostwriting involves thanking writers for providing “editorial assistance” in the acknowledgments section of the paper instead of the authorship byline, which essentially changes the rule of authorship attribution so that ghostwriting is acceptable. Several groups in medicine including the European Medical Writers Association (EMWA) sanction this practice. While the average reader likely interprets “editorial assistance” as help with grammar or improvements to the overall readability of the article, in reality, such “assistants” make major contributions to papers, and would commonsensically be considered co-authors. Tellingly, many medical writers are “editorial assistants” on some scientific papers, but co-authors on others. It would seem obvious that someone employed as a “medical writer” would be an author, but current dialogue on ghostwriting ignores such common-sense interpretations. Listing ghost authors as editorial assistants allows pharmaceutical companies to publish articles with conflicts-of interest that are not transparently reported. Editorial assistants are not mentioned in the abstract, are not indexed in publication databases, are not mentioned in subsequent citations, and are never mentioned in news media accounts of the article. In other words, the fact that a pharmaceutical company directly co-authored the paper is concealed from view. That this is seen as acceptable in an era of increased disclosure of conflicts-of-interest is puzzling.

While several groups in medicine including the European Medical Writers Association (EMWA) sanction the practice of thanking medical writers for providing “editorial assistance” in the acknowledgments section of the paper instead of listing them on the authorship byline, the problem with simply thanking ghostwriters in the acknowledgements section is clearly illustrated by Study 329, probably the most notorious ghostwritten paper in the medical literature. The study examined the use of Paxil in adolescents and concluded, “Paroxetine is generally well tolerated and effective for major depression in adolescents.” Several years after the paper was published, court proceedings revealed internal company documents admitting that the study found that Paxil was not any better than placebo on the pre-registered outcome measures, and that the company was concerned about how to manage the negative findings. According to the revised ICMJE Guidelines, Professional medical writers who write papers are not exempt from being listed as authors of the paper

== Prevalence ==
It is difficult to determine how frequently ghostwriting occurs due to its covert nature. A 2009 New York Times article estimated that 11% of New England Journal of Medicine articles, 8% of JAMA, Lancet and PLoS Medicine articles, 5% of Annals of Internal Medicine articles and 2% of Nature Medicine were ghost written. Between 1998 and 2005 Wyeth had 26 papers promoting hormone replacement therapy (HRT) published in scientific journals.

Previously secret internal Wyeth documents providing evidence of this are viewable on the Drug Industry Document Archive. It also appears to have occurred in 75% of industry funded trials between 1994 - 1995 approved by the Scientific Ethical Committees for Copenhagen and Frederiksberg. Of the articles published from 1998 to 2000 regarding sertraline, between 18% and 40% were ghost written by Pfizer. A questionnaire using comparable methods in 2005 and 2008 with a 14-28% response rate found a decrease in number of people who reported ghostwriting among professional medical writers.

Most pharmaceutical companies have in-house publication managers who may either manage the writing of publications on the company's drugs by a team of in-house medical writers or contract them out to medical communication companies or freelance medical writers. Reprints of the articles can be distributed to doctors in their offices or at medical meetings by drug company representatives in lieu of product brochures. This practice might be illegal if it effectively constitutes advertising or advocating use of the drug for non-approved indications or dosages. Payments to medical ghostwriters may be augmented with consulting contracts, paid trips to teach continuing medical education courses, or grants. The academics or doctors are known as "KOLs" ("Key Opinion Leaders") or "TLs" ("Thought Leaders").

== Senate investigation ==
On June 24, 2010, Senator Charles E. Grassley, Ranking Member of the United States Senate Committee on Finance issued a report on medical ghost writing. The report said, "The Committee was provided with documents from recent lawsuits involving Wyeth’s hormone therapy products. The documents showed that Wyeth hired a medical communications and education company, DesignWrite Inc. (DesignWrite), to draft review articles regarding the breast cancer risk of hormone therapy products and then invited academic researchers to sign on as the primary authors."

== See also ==
- Academic authorship
- Medical writing
- Research paper mill
- Study 329
