= Drug Industry Documents Archive =

The Drug Industry Documents Archive (DIDA) is a digital archive of pharmaceutical industry documents created and maintained by the University of California, San Francisco, Library and Center for Knowledge Management. DIDA is a part of the larger UCSF Industry Documents Library which includes the Truth Tobacco Industry Documents. The archive contains documents about pharmaceutical industry clinical trials, publication of study results, pricing, marketing, relations with physicians and drug company involvement in continuing medical education.

Most of the documents on DIDA were made public as a result of lawsuits against pharmaceutical companies Parke-Davis, Warner-Lambert, Pfizer, Merck & Co., Wyeth and Abbott Labs, among others. DIDA was founded in 2005 with the support of a gift by Thomas Greene, the attorney for David Franklin, whistleblower in United States ex rel. Franklin v. Parke-Davis, the case from which the first documents in the archive originated.

Researchers as well as students, journalists, and the general public, use the archive to investigate the ways pharmaceutical companies market their products. The UCSF_Library created this digital archive in an attempt to facilitate further research into the drug industry's practice of establishing close links with the medical community which has been shown to influence scientific research, drug approval, prescription practices, and ultimately, consumer health.

== Collections ==
DIDA contains:

- internal pharmaceutical company documents
- correspondence between drug companies and physicians, researchers and educational institutions
- regulatory and legal documents
- court filings
- depositions
- expert reports
- internal University documents

Documents come from a variety of sources including:

- Lawsuits against Merck & Co. regarding the marketing and use of Vioxx
- The landmark whistleblower case involving Neurontin (gabapentin) and off-label marketing: United States of America ex rel. David Franklin vs. Parke-Davis, Division of Warner-Lambert/Pfizer
- Investigations into conflict of interest and academic institutions by the US Senate Finance Committee, headed by Charles Grassley (R-Iowa)
- Investigations into the marketing of Vioxx to physicians by the United States House Committee on Oversight and Government Reform, headed by Henry A. Waxman
- Antitrust litigation involving Abbott Labs and their HIV/AIDS drug Norvir
- Lawsuits against Wyeth for the unethical promotion of the hormone replacement drug Premarin to women. Wyeth paid medical ghostwriters to author journal articles about the drug.
