= Paroxetine =

SSRI antidepressant

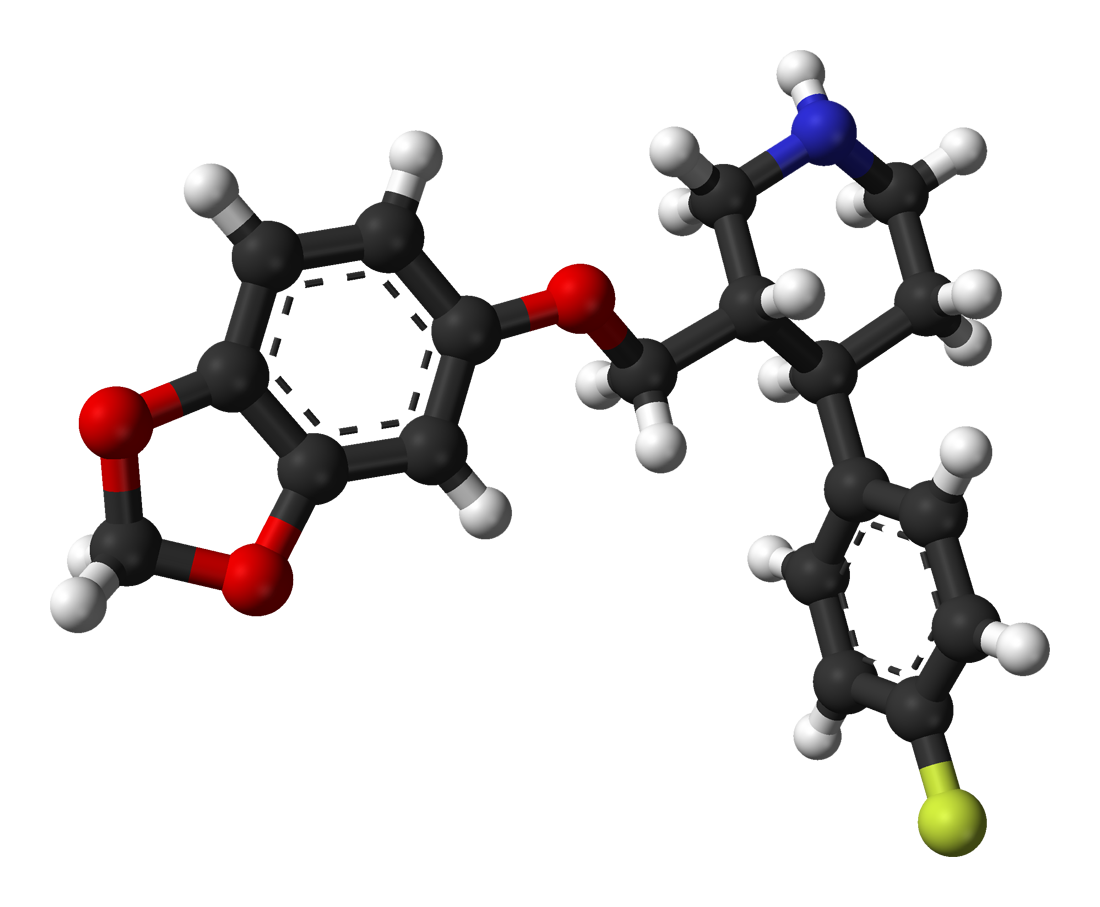

Clinical data
- Pronunciation: /pərˈɑːksəˌtin/ pər-AHK-sə-TEEN
- Trade names: Paxil, others
- AHFS/Drugs.com: Monograph
- MedlinePlus: a698032
- License data: US DailyMed: Paroxetine
- Pregnancy category: AU: D
- Routes of administration: By mouth
- Drug class: Selective serotonin reuptake inhibitor (SSRI)
- ATC code: N06AB05 (WHO)

Legal status
- Legal status: AU: S4 (Prescription only); BR: Class C1 (Other controlled substances); CA: ℞-only; UK: POM (Prescription only); US: ℞-only; In general: ℞ (Prescription only)

Pharmacokinetic data
- Bioavailability: 50%
- Protein binding: 93–95%
- Metabolism: Extensive, liver (mostly CYP2D6-mediated)
- Elimination half-life: 21 hours
- Excretion: Kidney (64%; 2% unchanged and 62% as metabolites), faecal (36%; <1% unchanged)

Identifiers
- IUPAC name: (3S,4R)-3-[(2H-1,3-benzodioxol-5-yloxy)methyl]-4-(4-fluorophenyl)piperidine
- CAS Number: 61869-08-7
- PubChem CID: 43815
- IUPHAR/BPS: 4790
- DrugBank: DB00715
- ChemSpider: 39888
- UNII: 41VRH5220H
- KEGG: D02362
- ChEBI: CHEBI:7936
- ChEMBL: ChEMBL490
- CompTox Dashboard (EPA): DTXSID3023425
- ECHA InfoCard: 100.112.096

Chemical and physical data
- Formula: C_{19}H_{20}FNO_{3}
- Molar mass: 329.371 g·mol^{−1}
- 3D model (JSmol): Interactive image
- SMILES: c1cc(ccc1[C@@H]2CCNC[C@H]2COc3ccc4c(c3)OCO4)F
- InChI: InChI=1S/C19H20FNO3/c20-15-3-1-13(2-4-15)17-7-8-21-10-14(17)11-22-16-5-6-18-19(9-16)24-12-23-18/h1-6,9,14,17,21H,7-8,10-12H2/t14-,17-/m0/s1; Key:AHOUBRCZNHFOSL-YOEHRIQHSA-N

Paroxetine, sold under the brand name Paxil among others, is an antidepressant medication of the selective serotonin reuptake inhibitor (SSRI) class used to treat major depressive disorder, obsessive–compulsive disorder (OCD), panic disorder, social anxiety disorder, post-traumatic stress disorder (PTSD), generalized anxiety disorder, and premenstrual dysphoric disorder. It has also been used in the treatment of premature ejaculation, and hot flashes due to menopause. It is taken orally (by mouth).

Common side effects include drowsiness, dry mouth, loss of appetite, sweating, trouble sleeping, and sexual dysfunction. In some patients, sexual dysfunction may persist even after the drug is discontinued, a condition known as post-SSRI sexual dysfunction; regulatory agencies including the European Medicines Agency and Health Canada have recommended that paroxetine's product labeling warn of this risk. Serious side effects may include suicidal thoughts in those under the age of 25, serotonin syndrome, and mania.

Paroxetine was approved for medical use in the United States in 1992 and initially sold by GlaxoSmithKline. It is on the World Health Organization's List of Essential Medicines. It is available as a generic medication. In 2023, it was the 72nd most commonly prescribed medication in the United States, with more than 9 million prescriptions. In 2018, it was in the top 10 of most prescribed antidepressants in the United States.

== Medical uses ==
Paroxetine is primarily used to treat major depressive disorder, obsessive–compulsive disorder, post-traumatic stress disorder, social anxiety disorder, and panic disorder. It is also occasionally used for agoraphobia, generalized anxiety disorder, premenstrual dysphoric disorder, and menopausal hot flashes.

=== Depression ===
A variety of meta-analyses have been conducted to evaluate the efficacy of paroxetine in depression. They have variously concluded that paroxetine is superior to placebo and that it is equivalent to other antidepressants. Despite this, there was no clear evidence that paroxetine was better or worse compared with other antidepressants at increasing response to treatment at any point in time.

=== Anxiety disorders ===
Paroxetine was the first antidepressant approved in the United States for the treatment of panic disorder. Several studies have concluded that paroxetine is superior to placebo in the treatment of panic disorder.

Paroxetine has demonstrated efficacy for the treatment of social anxiety disorder in adults and children. It is also beneficial for people with co-occurring social anxiety disorder and alcohol use disorder. It appears to be similar to a number of other SSRIs.

Paroxetine is used in the treatment of obsessive-compulsive disorder. Comparative efficacy of paroxetine is equivalent to that of clomipramine and venlafaxine. Paroxetine is also effective for children with obsessive-compulsive disorder.

Paroxetine is approved for the treatment of PTSD in the United States, Japan, and Europe. In the United States, it is approved for short-term use.

Paroxetine is also FDA-approved for generalized anxiety disorder.

=== Menopausal hot flashes ===
In 2013, low-dose paroxetine was approved in the US for the treatment of moderate-to-severe vasomotor symptoms such as hot flashes and night sweats associated with menopause. At the low dose used for menopausal hot flashes, side effects are similar to placebo and dose tapering is not required for discontinuation.

=== Fibromyalgia ===
Studies have also shown paroxetine "appears to be well-tolerated and improve the overall symptomatology in patients with fibromyalgia", but is less robust in helping with the pain involved.

=== Premature ejaculation ===
Off-label paroxetine prolongs intravaginal ejaculatory latency time by about 5.6 minutes versus placebo and shows a relatively lower risk of adverse events compared to other pharmacologic treatments for premature ejaculation.

== Adverse effects ==
Common side effects include drowsiness, dry mouth, loss of appetite, sweating, insomnia, and sexual dysfunction. Serious side effects may include suicide in those under the age of 25, serotonin syndrome, and mania. While the rate of side effects appears similar compared to other SSRIs and SNRIs, antidepressant discontinuation syndromes may occur more often. Use in pregnancy is not recommended, while use during breastfeeding is relatively safe.

The Federal Aviation Administration (FAA), the U.S. agency responsible for regulating civil aviation, considers paroxetine to be an antidepressant medication that is ineligible for an FAA Authorization of Special Issuance (SI) or Special Consideration (SC) of a medical certificate.

Paroxetine shares many of the common adverse effects of SSRIs, including (with the corresponding rates seen in people treated with placebo in parentheses):

- nausea 26% (9%)
- somnolence 23% (9%)
- dry mouth 18% (12%)
- headache 18% (17%)
- asthenia (weakness) 15% (6%)
- constipation 14% (9%)
- dizziness 13% (6%)
- insomnia 13% (6%)
- diarrhea 12% (8%)
- sweating 11% (2%)
- tremor 8% (2%)
- loss of appetite 6% (2%)
- nervousness 5% (3%)
- blurred vision 4% (1%)
- paraesthesia 4% (2%)
- hypomania 1% (0.3%)
- sexual dysfunction (≥10% incidence)

Most of these adverse effects are transient and go away with continued treatment. Central and peripheral 5-HT_{3} receptor stimulation is believed to result in the gastrointestinal effects observed with SSRI treatment. Compared to other SSRIs, it has a lower incidence of diarrhea, but a higher incidence of anticholinergic effects (e.g., dry mouth, constipation, blurred vision, etc.), sedation/somnolence/drowsiness, sexual side effects, and weight gain.

Due to reports of adverse withdrawal reactions upon terminating treatment, the Committee for Medicinal Products for Human Use at the European Medicines Agency recommends gradually reducing over several weeks or months if the decision to withdraw is made. See also Discontinuation syndrome (withdrawal).

Mania or hypomania may occur in 1% of patients with depression and up to 12% of patients with bipolar disorder. This side effect can occur in individuals with no history of mania, but it may be more likely to occur in those with bipolar disorder or with a family history of mania.

Paroxetine is described as a 'hepatoxic agent' and has been associated with hepatoxicity and jaundice.

=== Suicide ===
Like other antidepressants, paroxetine may increase the risk of suicidal thinking and behaviour in people under the age of 25. The FDA conducted a statistical analysis of paroxetine clinical trials in children and adolescents in 2004 and found an increase in suicidality and ideation as compared to placebo, which was observed in trials for both depression and anxiety disorders. In 2015, a paper published in The BMJ that reanalysed the original case notes argued that in Study 329, assessing paroxetine and imipramine against placebo in adolescents with depression, the incidence of suicidal behavior had been under-reported and the efficacy exaggerated for paroxetine.

=== Post-SSRI sexual dysfunction ===
Severe sexual dysfunction, including loss of libido, anorgasmia, lack of vaginal lubrication, and erectile dysfunction, is one of the most commonly encountered adverse effects of treatment with paroxetine and other SSRIs. While early clinical trials suggested a relatively low rate of sexual dysfunction, more recent studies in which the investigator actively inquires about sexual problems suggest that the incidence is higher than 70%. Paroxetine has consistently been found to have the highest rate of sexual side effects among the SSRIs.

In some patients, these effects persist after discontinuation of the drug, a condition known as post-SSRI sexual dysfunction (PSSD). Characteristic symptoms include genital numbness, pleasureless or weak orgasm, loss of libido, and erectile dysfunction; non-sexual symptoms such as emotional blunting and cognitive impairment may also occur. The condition can arise after even brief exposure to a serotonin reuptake inhibitor and may persist indefinitely; there is currently no established treatment. The DSM-5 noted in 2013 that serotonin reuptake inhibitor-induced sexual dysfunction may persist after the agent is discontinued.

Paroxetine was among the earliest SSRIs to be associated with persistent sexual dysfunction in the peer-reviewed literature. A 2023 retrospective cohort study of over 12,000 males estimated the risk of irreversible sexual dysfunction at approximately 0.46% of patients treated with serotonergic antidepressants, including SSRIs, though the actual prevalence remains uncertain and the condition is likely underreported. A 2023 systematic review found that paroxetine was among the SSRIs most frequently reported in PSSD case reports, alongside escitalopram, citalopram, sertraline, and fluoxetine. Paroxetine's high rate of on-treatment sexual dysfunction relative to other SSRIs, combined with its severe withdrawal profile, may make persistent post-discontinuation sexual effects particularly difficult for patients and clinicians to distinguish from withdrawal symptoms.

In 2019, the European Medicines Agency's Pharmacovigilance Risk Assessment Committee (PRAC) recommended that product labels for all SSRIs and SNRIs, including paroxetine, be updated to state that sexual dysfunction may be long-lasting even after treatment is stopped. Health Canada followed with similar label updates in 2021. In 2024, Australia's Therapeutic Goods Administration aligned all SSRI and SNRI product information to reflect this risk.

=== Pregnancy ===
Antidepressant exposure (including paroxetine) is associated with shorter duration of pregnancy (by three days), increased risk of preterm delivery (by 55%), lower birth weight (by 75 g or 2.6 oz), and lower Apgar scores (by <0.4 points). The American College of Obstetricians and Gynecologists recommends that for pregnant women and women planning to become pregnant, paroxetine "be avoided, if possible", as it may be associated with increased risk of birth defects.

Babies born to women who used paroxetine during the first trimester have an increased risk of cardiovascular malformations, primarily ventricular and atrial septal defects. Unless the benefits of paroxetine justify continuing treatment, consideration should be given to stopping or switching to another antidepressant. Paroxetine use during pregnancy is associated with about 1.5– to 1.7-fold increase in congenital birth defects, in particular, heart defects, cleft lip and palate, clubbed feet, or any birth defects.

=== Discontinuation syndrome ===
Many psychoactive medications can cause withdrawal symptoms upon discontinuation from administration. Paroxetine has among the highest incidence rates and severity of withdrawal syndrome of any medication of its class. Common withdrawal symptoms for paroxetine include nausea, dizziness, lightheadedness and vertigo; insomnia, nightmares, and vivid dreams; feelings of electricity in the body, as well as rebound depression and anxiety. A liquid formulation of paroxetine is available and allows a very gradual decrease of the dose, which may prevent discontinuation syndrome. Another recommendation is to temporarily switch to fluoxetine, which has a longer half-life and thus decreases the severity of discontinuation syndrome.

In 2002, the U.S. FDA published a warning regarding "severe" discontinuation symptoms among those terminating paroxetine treatment, including paraesthesia, nightmares, and dizziness. The agency also warned of case reports describing agitation, sweating, and nausea. In connection with a Glaxo spokesperson's statement that withdrawal reactions occur only in 0.2% of patients and are "mild and short-lived", the International Federation of Pharmaceutical Manufacturers Associations said GSK had breached two of the federation's codes of practice.

Paroxetine prescribing information posted at GlaxoSmithKline has been updated related to the occurrence of a discontinuation syndrome, including serious discontinuation symptoms.

== Overdose ==
Acute overdosage is often manifested by vomiting, lethargy, ataxia, tachycardia, and seizures. Plasma, serum, or blood concentrations of paroxetine may be measured to monitor therapeutic administration, confirm a diagnosis of poisoning in hospitalized patients or to aid in the medicolegal investigation of fatalities. Plasma paroxetine concentrations are generally in a range of 40–400 μg/L in persons receiving daily therapeutic doses and 200–2,000 μg/L in poisoned patients. Postmortem blood levels have ranged from 1–4 mg/L in acute lethal overdose situations. Along with the other SSRIs, sertraline and fluoxetine, paroxetine is considered a low-risk drug in cases of overdose.

== Interactions ==
Interactions with other drugs acting on the serotonin system or impairing the metabolism of serotonin may increase the risk of serotonin syndrome or neuroleptic malignant syndrome (NMS)-like reaction. Such reactions have been observed with SNRIs and SSRIs alone, but particularly with concurrent use of triptans, MAO inhibitors, antipsychotics, or other dopamine antagonists.

The prescribing information states that paroxetine should "not be used in combination with an MAOI (including linezolid, an antibiotic which is a reversible non-selective MAOI), or within 14 days of discontinuing treatment with an MAOI", and should not be used in combination with pimozide, thioridazine, tryptophan, or warfarin.

Paroxetine interacts with the following cytochrome P450 enzymes:

- CYP2D6 for which it is both a substrate and a potent inhibitor.
- CYP2B6 (strong) inhibitor.
- CYP3A4 (weak) inhibitor.
- CYP1A2 (weak) inhibitor.
- CYP2C9 (weak) inhibitor.
- CYP2C19 (weak) inhibitor.

Paroxetine has been shown to be an inhibitor of G protein-coupled receptor kinase 2 (GRK2).

== Pharmacology ==
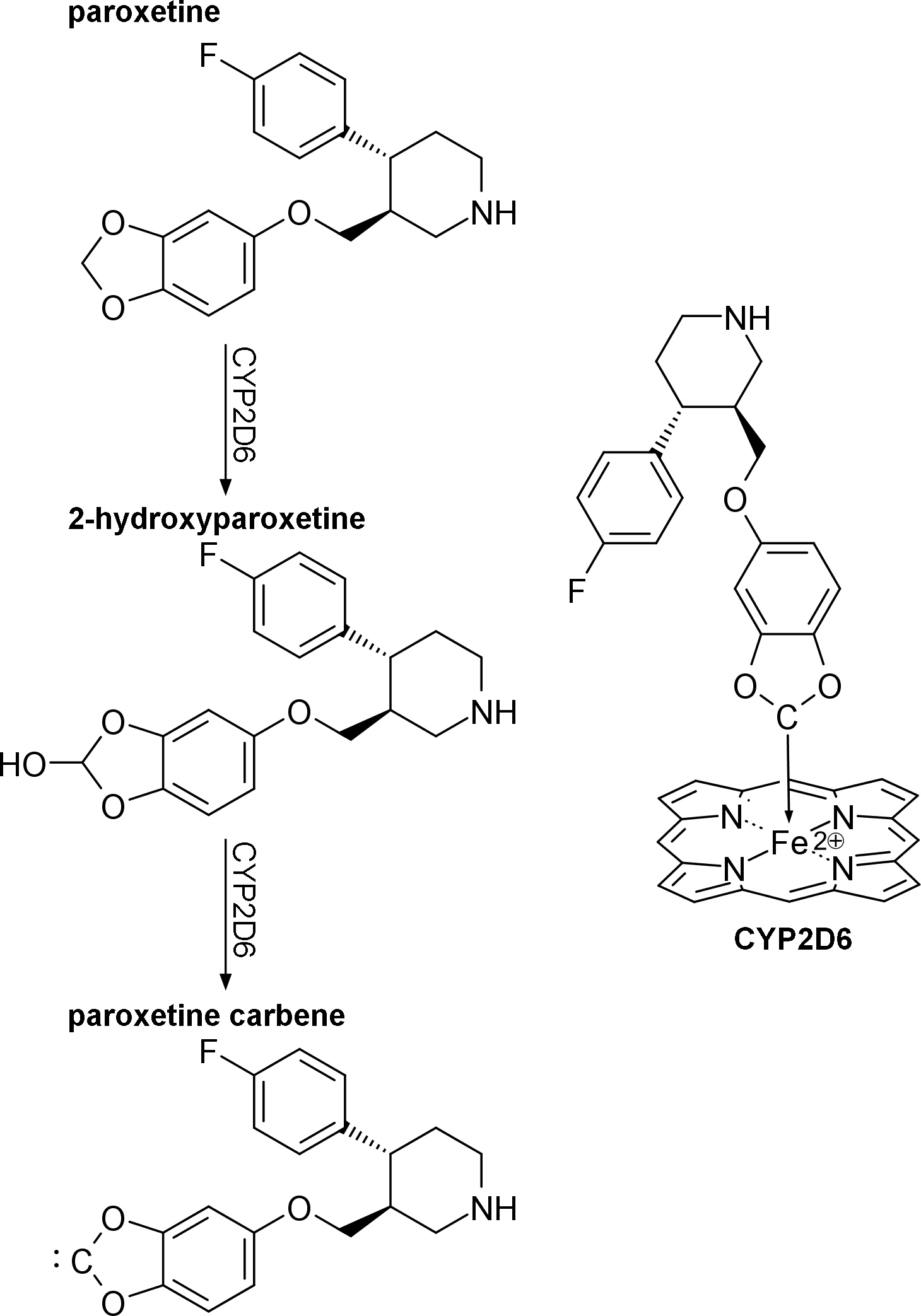
Mechanism of paroxetine inhibition of CYP2D6

=== Pharmacodynamics ===
Paroxetine is the most potent and one of the most specific selective serotonin (5-hydroxytryptamine, 5-HT) reuptake inhibitors (SSRIs). It also binds to the allosteric site of the serotonin transporter, similarly to escitalopram, though less potently so. Paroxetine also inhibits the reuptake of norepinephrine to a lesser extent (<50 nmol/L). Based on evidence from four weeks of administration in rats, the equivalent of 20 mg paroxetine taken once daily occupies approximately 88% of serotonin transporters in the prefrontal cortex. Paroxetine is a phenylpiperidine and might have some affinity for opioid receptors.

Binding profile Paroxetine
Receptor	K_{i} (nM)
SERT	0.07 – 0.2
NET	40 – 85
DAT	490
D_{2}	7,700
5-HT_{1A}	21,200
5-HT_{2A}	6,300
5-HT_{2C}	9,000
α_{1}	1,000 – 2,700
α_{2}	3,900
M_{1}	72
H_{1}	13,700 – 23,700

=== Pharmacokinetics ===
Paroxetine is well-absorbed following oral administration. It has an absolute bioavailability of about 50%, with evidence of a saturable first pass effect. When taken orally, it achieves maximum concentration in about 6–10 hours and reaches steady-state in 7–14 days. Paroxetine exhibits significant interindividual variations in volume of distribution and clearance. Less than 2% of an oral dose is excreted in urine unchanged.

Paroxetine is a mechanism-based inhibitor of CYP2D6.

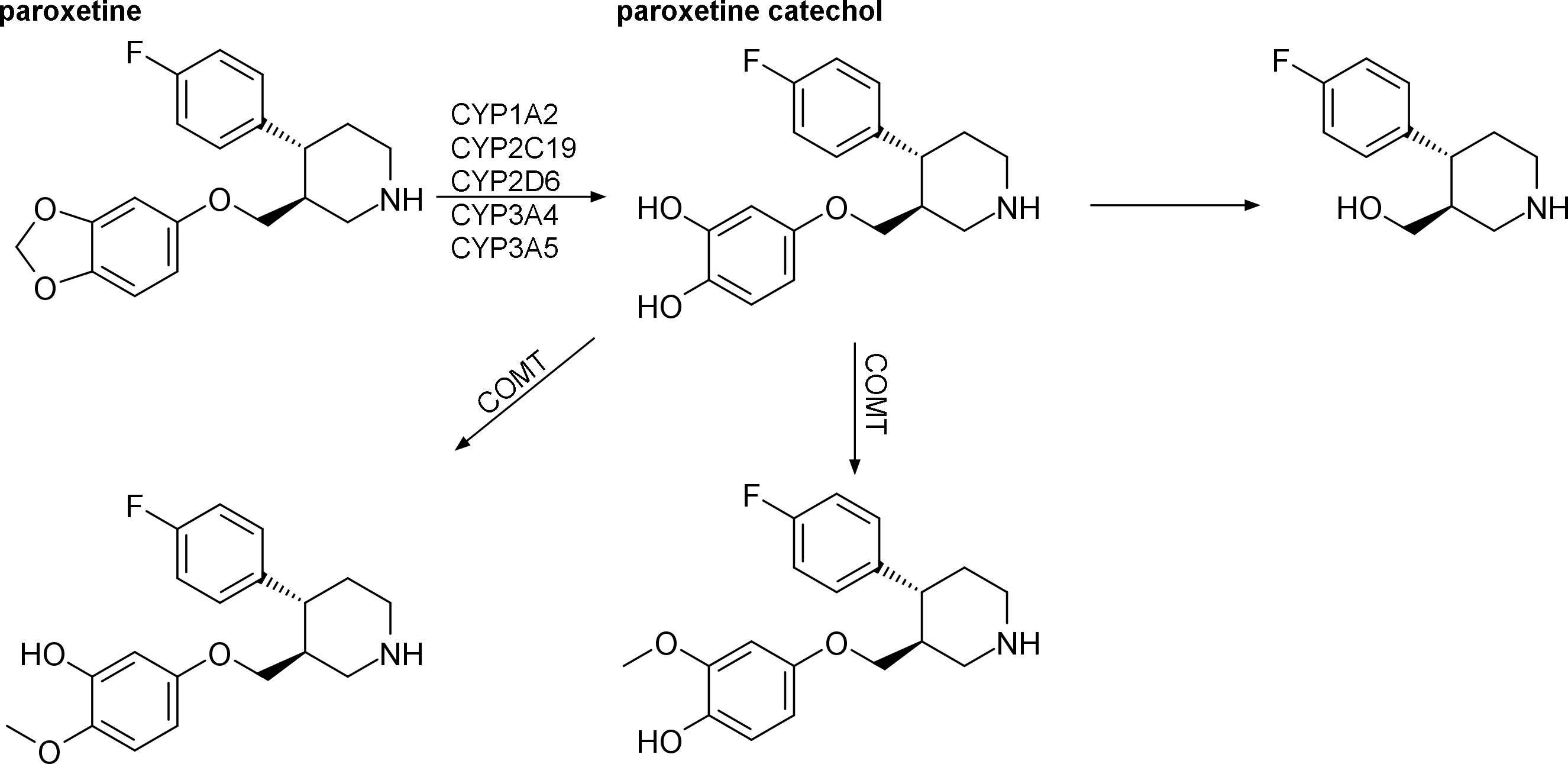
Metabolism of paroxetine in humans

== Society and culture ==
Paroxetine was approved for medical use in the United States in 1992 and initially sold by GlaxoSmithKline. It is available as a generic medication. In 2022, it was the 92nd most commonly prescribed medication in the United States, with more than 7 million prescriptions. It is on the World Health Organization's List of Essential Medicines.

GlaxoSmithKline has paid substantial fines, paid settlements in class-action lawsuits, and become the subject of several highly critical books about its marketing of paroxetine, in particular, the off-label marketing of paroxetine for children, the suppression of negative research results relating to its use in children, and allegations that it failed to warn consumers of substantial withdrawal effects associated with the use of the drug.

=== Marketing ===
In 2004, GSK agreed to settle charges of consumer fraud for $2.5 million. The legal discovery process also uncovered evidence of deliberate, systematic suppression of unfavorable Paxil research results. One of GSK's internal documents read, "It would be commercially unacceptable to include a statement that efficacy [in children] had not been demonstrated, as this would undermine the profile of paroxetine".

In 2012, the United States Department of Justice fined GlaxoSmithKline $3 billion for withholding data, unlawfully promoting use in those under 18, and preparing an article that misleadingly reported the effects of paroxetine in adolescents with depression following its clinical trial study 329.

In February 2016, the UK Competition and Markets Authority imposed record fines of £45 million on companies that were found to have infringed European Union and UK Competition law by entering into agreements to delay the market entry of generic versions of the drug in the UK. GlaxoSmithKline received the bulk of the fines, being fined £37,600,757. Other companies that produce generics were issued fines which collectively total £7,384,146. UK public health services are likely to claim damages for being overcharged in the period where the generic versions of the drug were illegally blocked from the market, as the generics are over 70% less expensive. GlaxoSmithKline may also face actions from other generic manufacturers who incurred losses as a result of the anticompetitive conduct. In April 2016, appeals were lodged with the Competition Appeal Tribunal by the companies which were fined.

GSK marketed paroxetine through television advertisements in the 1990s and 2000s. Commercials also aired for the CR version of the drug beginning in 2003.

=== Economics ===
In 2007, paroxetine was ranked 94th on the list of bestselling drugs, with over $1 billion in sales. In 2006, paroxetine was the fifth-most prescribed antidepressant in the U.S. retail market, with more than 19.7 million prescriptions. In 2007, sales had dropped slightly to 18.1 million but paroxetine remained the fifth-most prescribed antidepressant in the U.S.

=== Brand names ===
Brand names include Aropax, Paretin, Brisdelle, Deroxat, Paxil, Pexeva, Paxtine, Paxetin, Paroxat, Paraxyl, Sereupin, Daparox and Seroxat.

== Research ==
There is evidence that paroxetine may be effective in the treatment of compulsive gambling and hot flashes.

Benefits of paroxetine prescription for diabetic neuropathy or chronic tension headache are uncertain.

Although the evidence is conflicting, paroxetine may be effective for the treatment of dysthymia, a chronic disorder involving depressive symptoms for most days of the year.

There is evidence to support that paroxetine selectively binds to and inhibits G protein-coupled receptor kinase 2 (GRK2) in mice with heart failure. Since GRK2 regulates the activity of the beta adrenergic receptor, which becomes desensitized in cases of heart failure, paroxetine (or a paroxetine derivative) could be used as a heart failure treatment in the future.

Paroxetine has been identified as a potential disease-modifying osteoarthritis drug.

== Veterinary use ==
Paroxetine may be useful in the treatment of canine or feline behavioral diagnoses and is effective in the treatment of social anxiety, depression, and agitation associated with depression.

== Other organisms ==
Paroxetine is a common finding in wastewater. It is highly toxic to the alga Pseudokirchneriella subcapitata (syn. Raphidocelis subcapitata).

It also is toxic to the soil nematode Caenorhabditis elegans.

Alberca et al., 2016 found that paroxetine acts as a trypanocide against T. cruzi.

Alberca et al., 2016 finds a leishmanicide effect. Alberca finds that paroxetine produces cell death of the promastigotes of L. infantum. The mechanism of action remains unknown.

Various types of bacteria can break down paroxetine in the environment. These include, for example Pseudomonas sp., Bosea sp., Shewanella sp., Species of Chitinophagaceae and Acinetobacter sp.

== See also ==
- Disappearing polymorph § Paroxetine hydrochloride
