= List of drugs by year of discovery =

The following is a table of drugs organized by their year of discovery.

Naturally occurring chemicals in plants, including alkaloids, have been used since pre-history. In the modern era, plant-based drugs have been isolated, purified and synthesised anew. Synthesis of drugs has led to novel drugs, including those that have not existed before in nature, particularly drugs based on known drugs which have been modified by chemical or biological processes.

== Antiquity ==
=== Prehistory ===
Archaeological evidence indicates that the use of medicinal plants dates back to the Paleolithic age.

=== 4th millennium BCE ===
In ancient Egypt, herbs are mentioned in Egyptian medical papyri, depicted in tomb illustrations, or on rare occasions found in medical jars containing trace amounts of herbs. Medical recipes from 4000 BCE were for liquid preparations rather than solids. In the 4th millennium BCE, Soma (drink) and Haoma are named, but is not clear what ingredients were used to prepare them.

=== 3rd millennium BCE ===
Discovery	Name of drug	Active ingredients
2,700 BCE	Cannabis sativa	Cannabinoids, (e.g. tetrahydrocannabinol, a cannabinoid agonist, and cannabidiol, an analgesic and anticonvulsant).
2,700 BCE	Mandragora officinarum	Atropine and scopolamine (antimuscarinics), scopine, cuscohygrine, apoatropine, Belladonnines and non-alkaloid constituents including sitosterol and scopoletin.
2,700 BCE	Rhubarb	Anthraquinones, (e.g. emodin) which are cathartic and laxative. Stilbenoids (e.g. rhaponticin), which may lower blood glucose levels. Flavanol glucosides (e.g. (−)-catechin-7-O-glucoside) which may be cytoprotective.

=== 2nd millennium BCE ===
Written around 1600 BCE, the Edwin Smith Papyrus describes the use of many herbal drugs. The Ebers Papyrus – one of the most important medical papyri of ancient Egypt – was written around 1550 BCE, and covers more than 700 drugs, mainly of plant origin. The first references to pills were found on papyri in ancient Egypt, and contained bread dough, honey, or grease. Medicinal ingredients such as plant powders or spices were mixed in and formed by hand to make little balls, or pills. The papyri also describe how to prepare herbal teas, poultices, ointments, eye drops, suppositories, enemas, laxatives, etc. Aloe vera was used in the 2nd millennium BCE.

=== 1st millennium BCE ===
In Greece, Theophrastus of Eresos wrote Historia Plantarum in the 4th century BCE. Seeds likely used for herbalism have been found in archaeological sites of Bronze Age China dating from the Shang dynasty (c. 1600 BCE–c. 1046 BCE). Over a hundred of the 224 drugs mentioned in the Huangdi Neijing – an early Chinese medical text – are herbs. Herbs also commonly featured in the medicine of ancient India, where the principal treatment for diseases was diet.

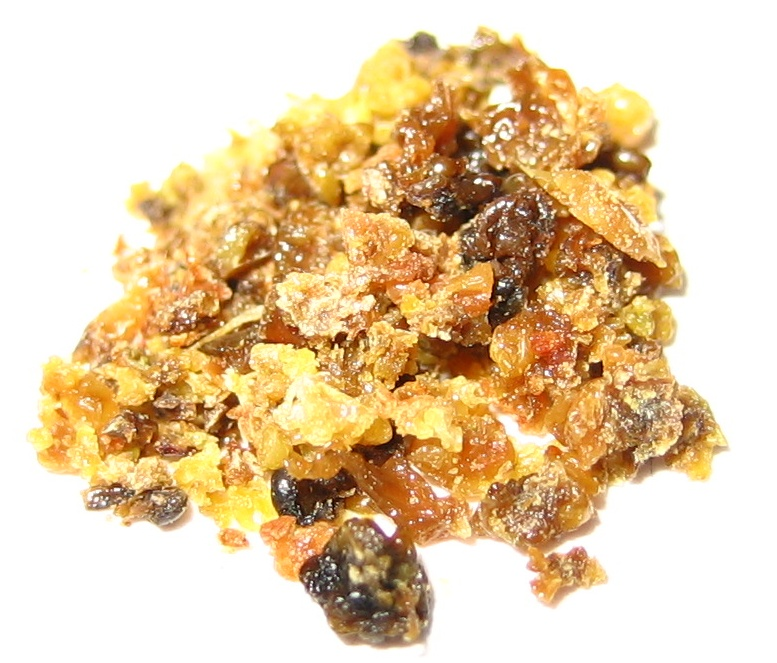
A sample of raw opium

Opioids are among the world's oldest known drugs. Use of the opium poppy for medical, recreational, and religious purposes can be traced to the 4th century BCE, when Hippocrates wrote about it for its analgesic properties, stating, "Divinum opus est sedare dolores." ("Divine work is the easing of pain")

Year of discovery	Name of the drug	Active ingredients
1st millennium BC	Hyoscyamus niger	Tropane alkaloids (e.g. hyoscyamine and scopolamine).
600 B.C.	Glycerol, produced	Glycerol
300 B.C.	Opium	Phenanthrenes (e.g. morphine, codeine, and thebaine). Morphine binds to and activates Mu opioid receptors and is analgesic. Opium also contains isoquinolines (e.g. papaverine and noscapine).

=== 1st century CE ===
In ancient Greece, pills were known as katapotia ("something to be swallowed"). Pliny the Elder, who lived from 23 to 79 CE, first gave a name to what we now call pills, calling them pilula. Pliny also wrote Naturalis Historia a collection of 38 books and the first pharmacopoea.

Pedanius Dioscorides wrote De Materia Medica (c. 40 – 90 CE); this book dominated the area of drug knowledge for some 1500 years until the 1600s.

Jojoba was used in the 1st millennium CE.

=== 2nd century CE ===
Aelius Galenus wrote more than 11 books about drugs, also use terra sigillata with kaolinite and goats blood to produce tablets.

== Post-classical to Early modern ==
Drugs developed in the post-classical (circa 500 to 1450) or early modern eras (circa 1453 to 1789).

=== 6th–11th century CE ===
In middle age ointments were a common dosage form.

Year of discovery	Name of the drug	Active ingredients
10th century	Coffee	Caffeine (adenosine receptor antagonist) Beta carboline (GABA_{A} receptor inverse agonist)

=== 11th century CE ===
Avicenna separates Medicine and Pharmacy, in 1025 published his book The Canon of Medicine, an encyclopedia of medicine formed by five books. Drugs mentioned by Avicenna include agaric, scammony and euphorbium. The latex of Euphorbia resinifera contains resiniferatoxin, an ultra potent capsaicin analog. Desensitization to resiniferatoxin is tested in clinical trials to treat neuropathic pain.

Year of discovery	Name of the drug	Active ingredients
Before 1025	Agaric	Muscimol (GABA_{A} receptor agonist), muscarine (muscarinic receptor agonist), and ibotenic acid (NMDA receptor agonist)
Before 1025	Scammony	Scammonin (In general, a powerful purgative and anthelmintic)
Before 1025	Euphorbium	Resiniferatoxin (capsaicin analog and possible analgesic)

=== 16th century CE ===
Paracelsus expounded the concept of dose response in his Third Defense, where he stated that "Solely the dose determines that a thing is not a poison." This was used to defend his use of inorganic substances in medicine as outsiders frequently criticized Paracelsus' chemical agents as too toxic to be used as therapeutic agents. Paracelsus discovered that the alkaloids in opium are far more soluble in alcohol than water. Having experimented with various opium concoctions, Paracelsus came across a specific tincture of opium that was of considerable use in reducing pain. He called this preparation laudanum.

For over a thousand years South American indigenous peoples have chewed Erythroxylon coca leaves, which contain alkaloids such as cocaine. Coca leaf remains have been found with ancient Peruvian mummies. There is also evidence coca leaves were used as an anesthetic. In 1569, Spanish botanist Nicolás Monardes described the indigenous peoples' practice of chewing a mixture of tobacco and coca leaves to induce "great contentment".

1400s Nicotine (Tobacco)

Year of discovery	Name of the drug
Before 1569	Erythroxylon coca leaves (containing cocaine)
16th century	Laudanum

=== 18th century CE ===
In 1778 John Mudge created the first inhaler devices. In 1747, James Lind, surgeon of HMS Salisbury, conducted the first clinical trial ever recorded, on it he studied how citrus fruit were capable of curing scurvy.

== Modern ==
=== 19th century CE ===
In the 1830s chemist Justus von Liebig began the synthesis of organic molecules, stating that "The production of all organic substances no longer belongs just to living organisms." In 1832 produced chloral hydrate, the first synthetic sleeping drug. In 1833 French chemist Anselme Payen was the first to discover an enzyme, diastase. In 1834, François Mothes and Joseph Dublanc created a method to produce a single-piece gelatin capsule that was sealed with a drop of gelatin solution. In 1853 Alexander Wood was the first physician that used hypodermic needle to dispense drugs via Injections. In 1858 Dr. M. Sales Giron invented the first pressurized inhaler.

Amphetamine was first synthesized in 1887 in Germany by Romanian chemist Lazăr Edeleanu who named it phenylisopropylamine; its stimulant effects remained unknown until 1927, when it was independently resynthesized by Gordon Alles and reported to have sympathomimetic properties. Shortly after amphetamine, methamphetamine was synthesized from ephedrine in 1893 by Japanese chemist Nagai Nagayoshi. Three decades later, in 1919, methamphetamine hydrochloride was synthesized by pharmacologist Akira Ogata via reduction of ephedrine using red phosphorus and iodine.

Year of discovery	Name of the drug	Synthesis mechanism		Year that was Patented	Governmental approval	Patented expired
Year of discovery	Name of the drug	Synthesis discoverer	Year	Year that was Patented	Governmental approval	Patented expired
1803–1805	Morphine	Gates synthesis	1952			
1820	Quinine (isolation)	Woodward and Doering	1944			
1830s	Santonin					
1832	Chloral hydrate	Justus von Liebig	1832			
1833	Diastase					
1853	Acetylsalicylic acid (Aspirin)		1899			
1875	Phenylhydrazine	Hermann Emil Fischer	1875	1875		
1877	Paracetamol	Harmon Northrop Morse	1877	1950		2007
1877	Mannitol	Julije Domac	1877	1950		
1880	Phenazone, "the mother of modern Antipyretics"	Ludwig Knorr	1880	1880		
1885	Ephedrine	Nagai Nagayoshi	1885	1885		
1890	Benzocaine	August Bischler	1895	1895		
1895	Quinazoline	August Bischler	1895	1895		
1887	Amphetamine	Lazăr Edeleanu	1887			
1893	Methamphetamine	Nagai Nagayoshi	1893			

=== 20th century CE ===
In 1901 Jōkichi Takamine isolated and synthesized the first hormone, Adrenaline. In 1907 Alfred Bertheim synthesized Arsphenamine, the first man-made antibiotic. In 1927 Erik Rotheim patented the first aerosol spray can. In 1933 Robert Pauli Scherer created a method to develop softgels.

William Roberts studies about penicillin were continued by Alexander Fleming, who in 1928 concluded that penicillin had an antibiotic effect. In 1944 Howard Florey and Ernst Boris Chain mass-produced penicillin. In 1948 Raymond P. Ahlquist published his seminal work where he divided adrenoceptors into α- and β-adrenoceptor subtypes, this allowed a better understanding of drugs mechanisms of action.

In 1987, after Montreal Protocol, CFC inhalers were phased out and HFA inhalers replace them. In 1987 CRISPR technique was discovered by Yoshizumi Ishino that in the next century would be used for genome editing.

Year of discovery	Name of the drug	Year when the synthesis mechanism was developed	Year that was Patented	Governmental approval	Patented expired
1901	Adrenaline	Jōkichi Takamine, 1901	1901	1901	N/A (Natural Hormone)
1906	Oxytocin	Discovered by Henry Hallett Dale, synthesized by Vincent du Vigneaud in 1952	1925	1926	N/A (Natural Hormone)
1907	Arsphenamine	Alfred Bertheim, 1907	N/A	N/A	N/A
1908	Phenytoin	Heinrich Biltz, 1908	N/A	N/A	N/A
1912	Vitamin C	Tadeusz Reichstein, 1933	N/A	N/A	N/A
1912	Phenobarbital	Fischer and Mering Synthesis, 1912	1912	1912	1932
1915	Thyroxine	Isolated by Edward Calvin Kendall, 1915	1915	1915	N/A (Natural Hormone)
1918	Ergotamine	Isolated by Arthur Stoll, Sandoz, 1918	1918	1918	1938
1920	Metamizole	1920	N/A	N/A	N/A
1921	Insulin	Frederick Grant Banting, 1921	1921	1921	N/A (Natural Hormone)
1927	Levothyroxine	Harington and Barger Synthesis, 1927	N/A	1927	(Synthetic hormone)
1928	Penicillin	Alexander Fleming, 1928	1928	1928	Never patented
1932	Sulfanilamide	Paul Josef Jakob Gelmo, 1908	N/A	N/A	1938
1932	Prontosil	Gerhard Domagk, Josef Klarer and Fritz Mietzsch 1932	N/A	N/A	1938
1935	Cortisone	Isolated by Philip Showalter Hench and Edward Calvin Kendall, 1935	1935	1935	N/A (Natural Hormone)
1935	Tetracaine	1935	1935	1935	1955
1935	Methylphenobarbital	1935	1935	1935	1955
1935	Dapsone	1935	1935	1935	1955
1938	Lysergic acid diethylamide (LSD)	Albert Hofmann, Sandoz	1938	1938	1958
1940	Dicoumarol (warfarin)	1940, extracted from Melilotus	1940	1940	1960
1946	Isosorbide	1946	1946	1946	1966
1943	Lidocaine	Nils Löfgren, 1943	1946	1949	1966
1950	Chlorpromazine	Paul Charpentier, 1950	1951	1953	1970
1951	Hydrocortisone	1951	1951	1951	1971
1951	Imipramine	1951	1951	1957	1971
1952	Acetazolamide	1952	1952	1952	1972
1954	Fludrocortisone acetate	1954	1954	1954	1974
1955	Prednisolone	1955	1955	1955	1975
1955	Prednisone	1955	1955	1955	1975
1955	Chlordiazepoxide	Leo Sternbach, Hoffmann-La Roche, 1955	1955	1955	1975
1956	Methylprednisolone	1956	1956	1956	1976
1956	Triamcinolone	1956	1956	1956	1976
1957	Spironolactone	1957	1957	1957	1977
1957	Mepivacaine	A. F. Ekenstam, 1957	1957	1957	1977
1957	Bupivacaine	1957	1957	1957	1977
1957	Chlorothiazide	1957	1957	1957	1977
1958	Dexamethasone	1958	1958	1958	1978
1958	Betamethasone	1958	1958	1958	1978
1958	Clozapine	1958	1958	1958	1978
1958	Triamcinolone acetonide (Nasacort)	1958	1958	1958	1978
1959	Hydrochlorothiazide	1959	1959	1959	1979
1959	Chlortalidone	1959	1959	1959	1979
1960	Fentanyl	Paul Janssen, Janssen Pharmaceutica 1960	1960	1969	1980
1961	Mefenamic acid	Claude Winde, Parke-Davis 1961	1961	1969	1981
1961	Ibuprofen	Boots Group, 1961	1961	1969	1981
1961	Flurbiprofen	Boots Group, 1961	1961	1969	1994
1962	Trimethoprim			1962	1982
1962	Furosemide	Calvin L. Stevens, Parke-Davis 1962		1962	1982
1962	Ketamine	Calvin L. Stevens, Parke-Davis 1962		1962	1982
1962	Piroxicam	Pfizer 1962		1962	1992
1962	Meloxicam	Pfizer 1962		1962	Not for use in humans
1962	Beclometasone	David Jack, 1962		1962	1982
1963	Diazepam	Leo Sternbach, 1963	1963	1963	1983
1963	Indometacin	1963	1963	1965	1983
1963	Flufenamic acid	Parke-Davis, 1963	1963	1965	1983
1963	Ropivacaine	1963	1963	1963	1983
1964	Meclofenamic acid	Parke-Davis, 1963	1963	1965	1983
1964	Propranolol	James Black, 1964		1964	
1964	Clonazepam	Leo Sternbach, 1964	1964	1964	1984
1964	Triamterene	1964	1964	1964	1984
1964	Tetrahydrocannabinol (dronabinol)	1964	1964	1964	N/A
1966	Salbutamol (Albuterol)	David Jack, Allen & Hanburys, 1966		1966	1986
1967	Amiloride	1964	1964	1964	1984
1968	Prilocaine	1968	1968	1968	N/A
1970	Ciclosporin	B. Vithal Shetty, 1971		1982	
1971	Metolazone	B. Vithal Shetty, 1971		1971	
1971	Cimetidine	James Black, 1971		1971	
1971	Mupirocin	Isolated in 1971		1971	
1971	Etidocaine	Isolated in 1971		1971	
1973	Diclofenac	Synthesized by Alfred Sallmann and Rudolf Pfister in 1973		1973	1993
1973	Budesonide	1973		1973	1993
1974	Sufentanil	Janssen Pharmaceutica, 1974			1994
1974	Carfentanil	Janssen Pharmaceutica, 1974			1994
1975	Captopril	1975	1976	1980	1995
1976	Ipratropium bromide	1976		1976	1996
1976	Naproxen	1976		1976	1996
1977	Ranitidine	John Bradshaw, Allen & Hanburys, 1977		1981	
1977	Propofol	John Bradshaw, Allen & Hanburys, 1977		1981	
1977	Tramadol	Grünenthal GmbH, 1977		1977	1997
1981	Verapamil	1981		1981	1997
1985	Salmeterol (Serevent)	David Jack, Allen & Hanburys, 1985		1985	2005
1984	Sumatriptan	David Jack, 1984		1984	2006
1987	Ondansetron	David Jack, 1987		1990	2006
1989	Ketorolac	1989		1989	2009
1993	Fluticasone propionate	David Jack, 1993		1993	2004
1993	Ketoprofen	James W. Young, William J. Wechter and Nancy M. Gray in 1993		1993	2003
1993	Celecoxib	1993		1993	2003
1993	Rofecoxib	1993		1993	2003
1994	Imatinib	Ciba-Geigy, 1994	1994	2001	2015
1995	Parecoxib	1995		Not approved	2015
1996	Lopinavir			2000	2020
1997	Mometasone furoate (Nasonex)	1997		1997	2017
1997	Eletriptan	1997		2002	2017
1998	Ropivacaine	1998	1998	1998	2008
1998	Leflunomide	1998		1998	2008

== 21st century CE ==
21st century begins with the first complete sequences of individual human genomes by Human Genome Project, on 12 February 2001, this allowed a switch in drug development and research from the traditional way of drug discovery that was isolating molecules from plants or animals or create new molecules and see if they could be useful in treatment of illness in humans, to pharmacogenomics, that is the study and knowledge of how genes respond to drugs. Another field beneficed by Human Genome Project is pharmacogenetics, that is the study of inherited genetic differences in drug metabolic pathways which can affect individual responses to drugs, both in terms of therapeutic effect as well as adverse effects.

Humane genome study also allowed to identify which genes are responsible of illness, and to develop drugs for rare diseases and also treatment of illness through gene therapy. In 2015 a simplified form of CRISPR edition was used in humans with Cas9, and also was used an even more simple method, Cas12a that prevent genetic damage from viruses. These advances are improving personalized medicine and allowing precision medicine.

Year of discovery	Name of the drug	Year when the synthesis mechanism was developed	Year that was Patented	Governmental approval	Patented expiry	Drug type *
2000	Bevacizumab			2004	2024	MA
2001	Valdecoxib			2016	N/A	SM
2001	Etoricoxib			2016	N/A	SM
2003	Alirocumab			2015	2035	MA
2006	Linagliptin			2011	2031	SM
2007	Apixaban			2012	2032	SM
2007	Alectinib			2014	2014	SM
2007	Sofosbuvir	2007, Raymond F. Schinazi.	N/A	N/A	N/A	SM
2007	Bevirimat					SM
2012	Ivacaftor			2012	2032	SM
2013	Vilanterol			2013	2033	SM
2014	Evolocumab			2015	2035	MA
2014	Umeclidinium bromide (Incruese Ellipta)			2014	2034	SM
2014	Tisagenlecleucel			2017	2037	ACT

* MA = Monoclonal antibody

SM = Small molecule

ACT = Adoptive cell transfer

== See also ==
- List of drugs
- Lists of molecules
- History of medicine
- List of pharmaceutical laboratories by year of foundation
- Lists of diseases by year of discovery
- Discovery and development of beta2 agonists
- Pharmacopoeia
- Edwin Smith Papyrus
- De Materia Medica
- Shennong Ben Cao Jing
- The Canon of Medicine
- The Book of Healing
