= Lists of diseases =

A medical condition is a broad term that includes all diseases and disorders.

A disease is an abnormal condition affecting the body of an organism.

A disorder is a functional abnormality or disturbance.

== Human diseases ==
- List of autoimmune diseases
- List of cancer types
- List of childhood diseases and disorders
- List of endocrine diseases
- List of eponymous diseases
- List of eye diseases and disorders
- List of intestinal diseases
- List of infectious diseases
- List of human disease case fatality rates
- List of notifiable diseases – diseases that should be reported to public health services, e.g., hospitals.
- List of pollution-related diseases
- List of skin conditions
- List of diseases by year of discovery

== Disorders ==
- List of disorders
- List of communication disorders
- List of genetic disorders
- List of heart disorders
- List of liver disorders
- List of neurological conditions and disorders
- List of mental disorders
  - List of eating disorders
  - List of mood disorders
  - List of personality disorders
- List of voice disorders
- List of vulvovaginal disorders

== Animal diseases ==
- List of aquarium diseases
- List of diseases of the honey bee
- List of diseases spread by arthropods
- List of dog diseases
- List of feline diseases
- List of zoonotic diseases
- Poultry disease

== Cereal diseases ==
- List of barley diseases
- List of maize diseases
- List of oat diseases
- List of pearl millet diseases
- List of rice diseases
- List of rye diseases
- List of sorghum diseases
- List of wheat diseases
- List of wild rice diseases

== Other diseases ==
- List of abbreviations for diseases and disorders
- List of fictional diseases, diseases found only in works of fiction.
- List of insect pests of millets
- Lists of plant diseases
- List of syndromes

== See also ==
- Category:Diseases and disorders
- Category:Lists of diseases
- Airborne disease, a disease that spreads through the air.
- Contagious disease, a subset of infectious diseases.
- Cryptogenic disease, a disease whose cause is currently unknown.
- Disseminated disease, a disease that is spread throughout the body.
- Environmental disease
- Lifestyle disease, a disease caused largely by lifestyle choices.
- Localized disease, a disease affecting one body part or area.
- Non-communicable disease, a disease that can not be spread between people.
- Organic disease
- Progressive disease, a disease that gets worse over time.
- Rare disease, a disease that affects very few people.
- Systemic disease, a disease affecting the whole body.
