= List of disorders =

A list of types of disorders.

== A ==
- Adenoid disorders
- Adrenal disorders
- Allergic disorders
- Anorectic disorders
- Antisocial personality disorder
- Anxiety disorders
- Appendix disorders
- Articulation disorders
- Attention deficit hyperactivity disorder
- Autonomic nerve disorders
- Acute stress disorder
- Adjustment disorder
- Agoraphobia
- Autism Spectrum Disorder

== B ==
- Balance disorder
- Behavioral disorders
- Bleeding disorders
- Bipolar disorders
- Body dysmorphic disorder
- Borderline personality disorder

== C ==
- Cartilage disorders
- Cephalic disorders
- Chromosomal disorders
- Clotting disorders
- Communication disorders
- Congenital disorders
- Congenital insensitivity to pain with anhidrosis
- Conjunctival disorders
- Connective tissue disorders
- Cornea disorders

== D ==
- Delusional disorders
- Depressive disorders
- Disc disorders
- Dissociative disorders
- Digestive disorders
- Dyslexia

== F ==
- Female genital disorders
- Fluency disorders
- Fetal Alcohol Spectrum Disorder
- Fetal Drug Spectrum Disorder
- Fetal Tobacco Spectrum Disorder

== H ==
- Hearing disorders
- Heritable disorders of connective tissue

== I ==
- Iatrogenic disorders
- Immune disorders
- Impulse control disorders

== L ==
- Language disorders
- Learning disorders
- Lens disorders

== M ==
- Manical disorders
- Metabolic disorders
- Mood disorders
- Multiple personality disorder
- Movement disorders

== N ==
- Narcissistic personality disorder
- Nervous system disorders
- Neuronal migration disorders
- Neurological disorder

== O ==
- Orthopedic disorders
- Obsessive–compulsive disorder

== P ==
- Paraphilic Disorder
- Peritoneum disorders
- Personality disorders
- Pervasive developmental disorders
- Post-traumatic stress disorders
- Psychiatric disorders, i.e., mental illness
- Psychoactive substance abuse disorders
- Psychological disorders, i.e., mental illness
- Psychotic disorders
- Puerperal disorders

== R ==
- Refractive eye disorders
- Repetitive motion disorders
- Rett syndrome

== S ==
- Sexual dysfunction
- Sleep disorders
- Social anxiety disorder
- Soft tissue disorders
- Somatoform disorders
- Spastic disorders
- Speech disorders
- Spinal cord disorders
- Strabismus
- Systemic disorders
- Schizoaffective disorders

== T ==
- Testicle disorders
- Thymus disorders
- Thyroid disorders
- Tonsil disorders
- Translocation chromosome disorders
- Triplet repeat genetic disorders
- Tourette disorders
- TMJ disorders
- Trichotillomania

== V ==
- Vein disorders
- Voice disorders

== X ==
- X chromosome disorders

== Y ==
- Y chromosome disorders

== See also ==
- List of diseases
