= List of pharmaceutical laboratories by year of foundation =

The following is a table with laboratories organized by year of creation.

== 18th century ==
Year	Laboratory	Founder	Present
1715	Allen & Hanburys	Silvanus Bevan	Absorbed by Glaxo Laboratories in 1958.

== 19th century ==
Year	Laboratory	Founder	Present
1830	Smith, Kline & Co	John K. Smith	Became Smith, Kline & French
1844	French, Richard and Company	Clayton French and William Richard	In 1921 was bought by Smith, Kline & Co to form Smith, Kline & French
1848	Beecham Group	Thomas Beecham	Merged with Smith, Kline & Co to form SmithKline Beecham
1849	Pfizer	Charles Pfizer and Charles F. Erhart	Active
1876	Eli Lilly and Company	Eli Lilly	Active
1880	Wellcome	Henry Wellcome and Silas Burroughs	In 1995 merged with Glaxo to form Glaxo Wellcome
1895	Sandoz	Alfred Kern and Edouard Sandoz	In 1996 merged with Ciba-Geigy to form Novartis

== 20th century ==
Year	Laboratory	Founder	Present
1913	Astra AB		Merged with Zeneca in 1999 to form AstraZeneca
1924	Glaxo Laboratories	Joseph Nathan and Co	Merged in 1995 with Wellcome to form Glaxo Wellcome
1945	Recherche et Industrie Thérapeutiques	Pieter De Somer	Bought by Smith, Kline & French, currently GlaxoSmithKline Biologicals
1946	Grünenthal GmbH	Hermann Wirtz, Sr	Active
1950	Allergan, Inc.	Gavin S. Herbert	Bought by SmithKline Beckman in 1980
1959	Valeant Pharmaceuticals	Milan Panić	Its original name was ICN Pharmaceuticals
1976	Teva Pharmaceutical Industries	Assia and Zori	Active
1982	SmithKline Beckman	SmithKline & French	Merge between SmithKline & French and Beckman Inc.
1993	Zeneca	Merger of the pharmaceuticals and agrochemicals businesses of Imperial Chemical Industries	Merged With Astra AB to form AstraZeneca
1996	Novartis	Merger of Ciba-Geigy and Sandoz	Active
1999	AstraZeneca	Merger Astra AB and Zeneca	Active

== 21st century ==
Year	Laboratory	Founder	Present
2013	Calico	Bill Maris |	Active

== See also ==
- Pharmacy
- List of drugs
- List of drugs by year of discovery
- History of medicine
