= Oral manifestations of systemic disease =

Signs of disease presenting in the mouth

Oral manifestations of systematic disease are signs and symptoms of disease occurring elsewhere in the body detected in the oral cavity and oral secretions. High blood sugar can be detected by sampling saliva. Saliva sampling may be a non-invasive way to detect changes in the gut microbiome and changes in systemic disease. Another example is tertiary syphilis, where changes to teeth can occur. Syphilis infection can be associated with longitudinal furrows of the tongue.

Mineral and vitamin deficiencies can cause the tongue to appear beefy red and feel sore. Those deficiencies are iron, folate, and vitamin B12. A hairy tongue may be an indication of Epstein Barr virus infection and is usually seen in those infected with human immunodeficiency virus. Other systemic diseases that can cause the tongue to form aphthous ulcers are: Crohn's disease and ulcerative colitis, Behcet's Syndrome, pemphigus vulgaris, herpes simplex, histoplasmosis, and reactive arthritis.

== Cardiovascular and haematological system ==
A heart attack is a blood vessel in the heart being constricted either by a blood clot or atherosclerosis formation. A heart attack can cause pain the chest; sometimes this pain can radiate up to the jaw. (Malik et al., 2013)

Calcium channel blockers are medications prescribed for the treatment of a number of heart conditions and primarily to treat high blood pressure. They can cause gingival hypertrophy (overgrowth), particularly dihydropyridine and nifidipine. Poor dental hygiene and inflamed gums are a risk factor. The overgrowth is not permanent, it is suggested that if the medication is stopped then the overgrowth can reduce[ however, this is a decision that would have to be made in conjunction with the patient's dentist and cardiologist as the risk of stopping some medications outweigh any advantage gained (Livada and Shiloah, 2013)

Nicorandil is a medication that is prescribed for the treatment of angina. It can cause major aphthous-like ulcer formation (BNF, 2020).

Iron, folate and vitamin B12 deficiencies – The most commonest cause of iron deficiencies is low ferritin; this can cause the tongue to appear beefy red and appear sore. It can also present in the mouth as angular chelitis, which is an infection caused by either staphylococcus or candidiasis, and can make the corners of the mouth appear red and crispy.

Sickle cell disease is a hereditary genetic condition that results in deformed red blood cells to be formed. Sickle patients can experience sickle crisis, these are painful events in which if in the jaw can mimic dental pain and facial swelling can also occur during a crisis. The dental pulp can be affected by sickling and there may be a delayed eruption and hypoplasia of the dentition. Sickle patients are also at an increased risk of developing infection.

Thalasseamias is a group of inherited genetic disorders that affect the haemoglobin synthesis; it can result in either a reduced or absent globin chain production. If beta thalassaemia major is left untreated or under transfused, there is expansion of ineffective bone marrow, this leads to bony deformities resulting in dental malocclusion. Beta thalassaemia major patients may also be on bisphosphonates and are therefore at risk of developing osteonecrosis of the jaw.

Thrombocytopenia is a deficiency of platelets in the blood. It can present as red blood blisters in the mouth.

== Respiratory system ==
Patients with respiratory conditions like asthma and chronic obstructive pulmonary disease can be prescribed steroidal inhalers to help strengthen their lungs. They must ensure after use that they rinse their mouths, otherwise there is an increase of dental caries, xerostomia, candidiasis, ulceration and gingivitis/periodontitis (Godara et al., 2011).

== Renal system ==
There are a number of oral complications following renal transplantation. Ciclosporin is an immunosuppressant medication that is used to help prevent patients from rejecting the transplanted kidney (BNF, 2020). Due to the immunosuppression (suppressed immune system), these patients are more likely to have gingival hyperplasia, aphthous ulceration, herpes simplex virus, oral leucoplakia; which may transform into squamous cell carcinoma, candidiasis infection or Kaposi's sarcoma (BNF, 2020).

== Digestive system ==
There are many specific diseases of the gastrointestinal tract which have an impact on oral health. Systemic disease can affect the upper GI tract such as dysphagia, dysmotility, gastro-oesophageal reflux and peptic ulcer disease; or lower in the tract such as coeliac disease, Crohn's disease, ulcerative colitis and familial adenomatous polyposis.

Dysphagia is defined as a difficulty in swallowing. Structurally it worsens when eating solids and neurologically it is worse with fluids. Structural problems may include malignancy, stricture and pharyngeal pouching which can lead to halitosis, regurgitation of undigested food and high feeling of dysphagia. Neurological problems may be related to the patient having multiple sclerosis, motor neuron disease, or having had a stroke. Dysphagia may present as a barrier to care in the dental setting as the patient may require high volume suction in order to maintain patient comfort and reduce the risk of aspiration of dental material/ fluids.

Gastroesophageal reflux can present as retrosternal pain, acid brash and a hoarse voice. Risk factors for gastroesophageal reflux disease are obesity, diet, smoking and hiatal hernia. Complications of which being oesophagitis, Barrett's oesophagus, Strictures and ulcers. Common management of gastroesophageal reflux disease include lifestyle measures, proton pump inhibitors and rarely surgery. There is a clear relationship between gastroesophageal reflux disease and dental erosion and therefore can be detrimental to hard tissues i.e. teeth and also soft tissues of the mouth.

Crohn's disease is a patchy disease which can affect any area of the GI tract from the oral cavity to the anus. The manifestations depend on the affected area. The oral manifestations present as orofacial granulomatosis, an inflammatory condition affecting the oral mucosa. It is non-caveating granulomas and has a "cobblestone" appearance. Orofacial granulomatosis can be isolated or a manifestation of Crohn's disease and can be treated with local or systemic corticosteroids. An aggravating factor is cinnamon, therefore a cinnamon-free diet is recommended.

Eating disorders are a psychological problem which has an impact on the gastrointestinal tract. Two common eating disorders are anorexia nervosa and bulimia nervosa. Anorexia nervosa is a refusal to maintain a "normal" body weight with a fear of weight gain and distorted perception of body image. Bulimia nervosa is binge-eating followed by attempts to restrict weight gain and can include purging. Eating disorder oral manifestation is severe palatal erosion due to vomiting. There is occlusal erosion of the maxillary teeth causing the incised edges of the incisors to be thin and knife-edged. Occlusal surfaces have a flat to cupped-out appearance. Extra-orally eating disorders may present with swollen parotid glands.

Other oral manifestations of GI disease is angular stomatitis, commonly seen in iron-deficient anaemia and mouth ulcers in Crohn's disease.

== Endocrine system ==
Diabetes Mellitus has two main types: Type 1, autoimmune destruction of beta-cells leading to reduced insulin production and Type 2, the body becomes increasingly resistant to the effects of insulin leading to the bodies inability to regulate plasma glucose levels resulting in a fall in insulin production. Diabetes has numerous implications on oral health. Patient with diabetes have increase extent and severity of periodontal disease, increased prevalence of dental caries due to xerostomia, can experience burning mouth syndrome and candidal infections as well as experiencing altered taste sensation, altered tooth eruption and hypertrophy of the parotid glands. Other oral health problems include chronic hyperglycaemia, infection, delayed wound healing and lichen planus/lichenoid reactions.

The oral manifestations of Acromegaly predominate as spacing of the lower incisor teeth and widening of the mandible. Other complications include visual field defects, headaches, Diabetes, Sleep apnoea, Hypertension, Arthralgia and Arthritis and Carpal Tunnel Syndrome. Arthralgia and Carpal Tunnel Syndrome both have an impact on a patients' ability to maintain good oral hygiene practice and therefore may predispose them to Dental caries and Periodontal Disease. It is imperative these patients are given Enhanced Prevention in order to reduce the risk of Dental Caries and Periodontal Disease.

Another endocrine disorder that may present orally is Addison's disease. Signs include skin hyperpigmentation, alabaster-coloured pale skin, low blood pressure, postural hypotension. Skin pigmentation have increased deposition in the palmer skin creases, nails and gingiva. Management of Addison's is with steroids. During dental treatment the patient may require an increased dose of steroids based on treatment need.

== Skeletal system ==
Osteopgenesis imperfecta, also known as brittle bone disease, is caused by a gene mutation affecting the collagen genes, patients generally present with a large number of fractures from minor injuries. Teeth, if affected, are of the appearance of dentinogenesis imperfecta.

Osteoporosis is a very common disease associated with a decreased bone mineral density, it mainly affects post menopausal women whose oestrogen levels have dropped. It is managed with the used of bisphosphonates. Prior to placement on bisphosphonates, a dental check must be done to extract any hopeless teeth as extractions in patients who have prolonged used of bisphosphonates are at risk of MRONJ. (SDCEP,2017)

== Immune system ==
Human immunodeficiency virus infects and destroys cells of the immune system, principally the CD4+ T-helper lymphocytes. As well as lymphocytes, CD4 receptors are also present on the surface of macrophages and monocytes, cells in the brain, skin, and probably many other sites. The normal CD4 count is 500-1500 per mm^{3}, and patients with human immunodeficiency virus infection often have a CD4 count less than 500. Patients who are infected with human immunodeficiency virus positive have an increased risk of developing infections and tumours. The lower the CD4 count, the greater the likelihood and the severity of illness. A CD4 count less than 200 is a diagnosis of Acquired Immunodeficiency Syndrome (AIDS). Oral manifestations of human immunodeficiency virus include candidiasis, oral hairy leukoplakia, oral ulcers, oral warts, oral lymphoma and Kaposi's sarcoma. Other presentations include gingivitis and oral malignancies. Treatment and management of AIDS is based on highly active anti-retroviral therapy, which significantly lowers the prevalence of oral lesions, particularly oral candidiasis and oral hairy leukoplakia.
