= Mouth =

First portion of the alimentary canal that receives food

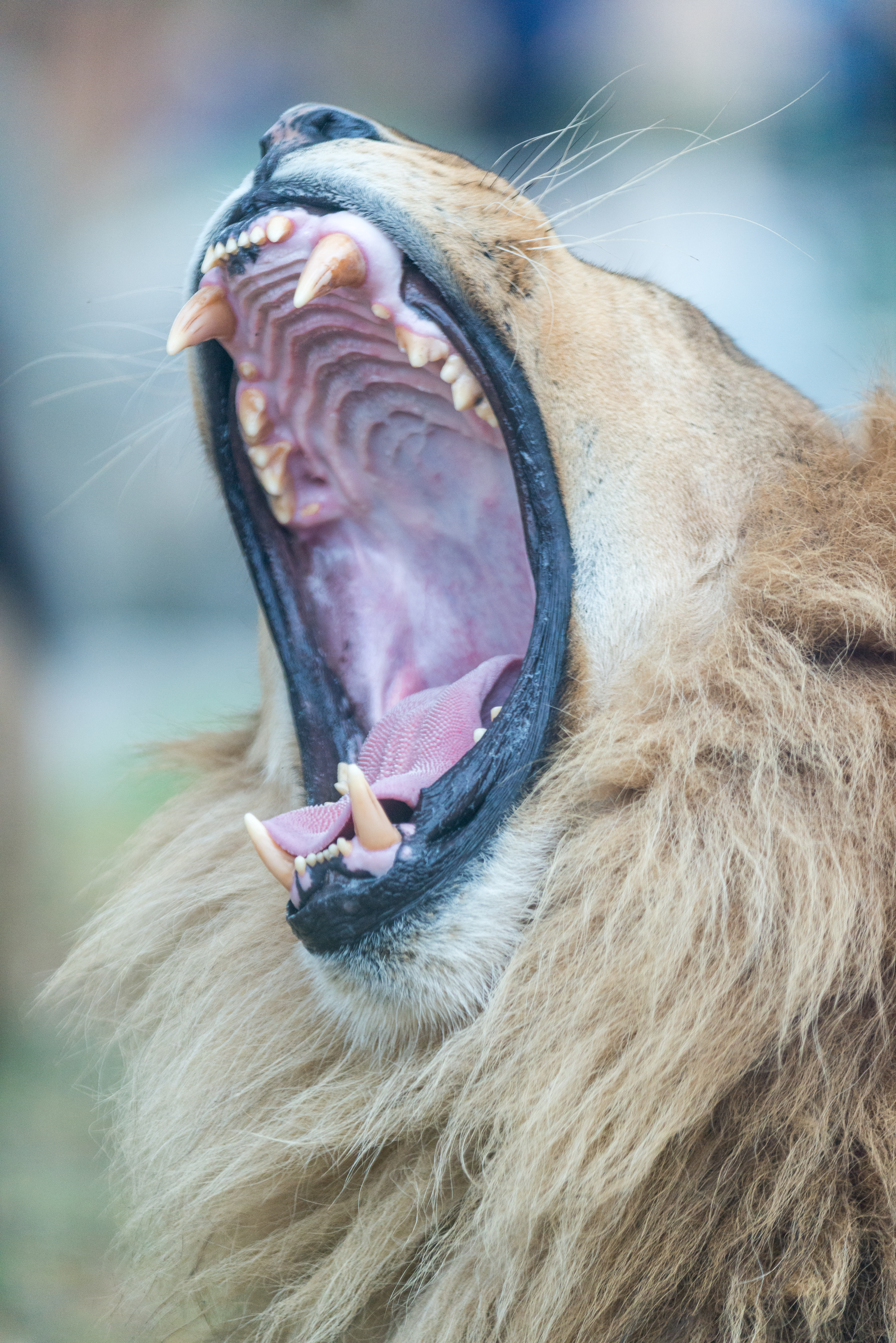
- A lion yawning

Details

Identifiers
- Latin: os, oris
- Greek: στόμα (stóma)
- MeSH: D009055
- TA98: A05.1.00.001
- TA2: 119, 2774
- FMA: 49184

A mouth, also referred to as the oral, is the body orifice through which many animals ingest food and vocalize. The body cavity immediately behind the mouth opening, known as the oral cavity (or cavum oris in Latin), is also the first part of the alimentary canal, which leads to the pharynx and the gullet. In tetrapod vertebrates, the mouth is bounded on the outside by the lips and cheeks — thus the oral cavity is also known as the buccal cavity (from Latin bucca, meaning "cheek") — and contains the tongue on the inside. Except for some groups like birds and lissamphibians, vertebrates usually have teeth in their mouths, although some fish species have pharyngeal teeth instead of oral teeth.

Most bilaterian phyla, including arthropods, molluscs and chordates, have a two-opening gut tube with a mouth at one end and an anus at the other. Which end forms first in ontogeny is a criterion used to classify bilaterian animals into protostomes and deuterostomes.

== Development ==
Development of the mouth and anus in protostomes and deuterostomes

In the first multicellular animals, there was probably no mouth or gut, and food particles were engulfed by the cells on the exterior surface by a process known as endocytosis. The particles became enclosed in vacuoles into which enzymes were secreted, and digestion took place intracellularly. The digestive products were absorbed into the cytoplasm and diffused into other cells. This form of digestion is used nowadays by simple organisms such as Amoeba and Paramecium and also by sponges which, despite their large size, have no mouth or gut and capture their food by endocytosis.

However, most animals have a mouth and a gut, the lining of which is continuous with the epithelial cells on the surface of the body. A few animals which live parasitically originally had guts but have secondarily lost these structures. The original gut of diploblastic animals probably consisted of a mouth and a one-way gut. Some modern invertebrates still have such a system: food being ingested through the mouth, partially broken down by enzymes secreted in the gut, and the resulting particles engulfed by the other cells in the gut lining. Indigestible waste is ejected through the mouth.

In animals at least as complex as an earthworm, the embryo forms a dent on one side, the blastopore, which deepens to become the archenteron, the first phase in the formation of the gut. In deuterostomes, the blastopore becomes the anus while the gut eventually tunnels through to make another opening, which forms the mouth. In the protostomes, it used to be thought that the blastopore formed the mouth (proto– meaning "first") while the anus formed later as an opening made by the other end of the gut. More recent research, however, shows that in protostomes the edges of the slit-like blastopore close up in the middle, leaving openings at both ends that become the mouth and anus.

== Anatomy ==
=== Invertebrates ===
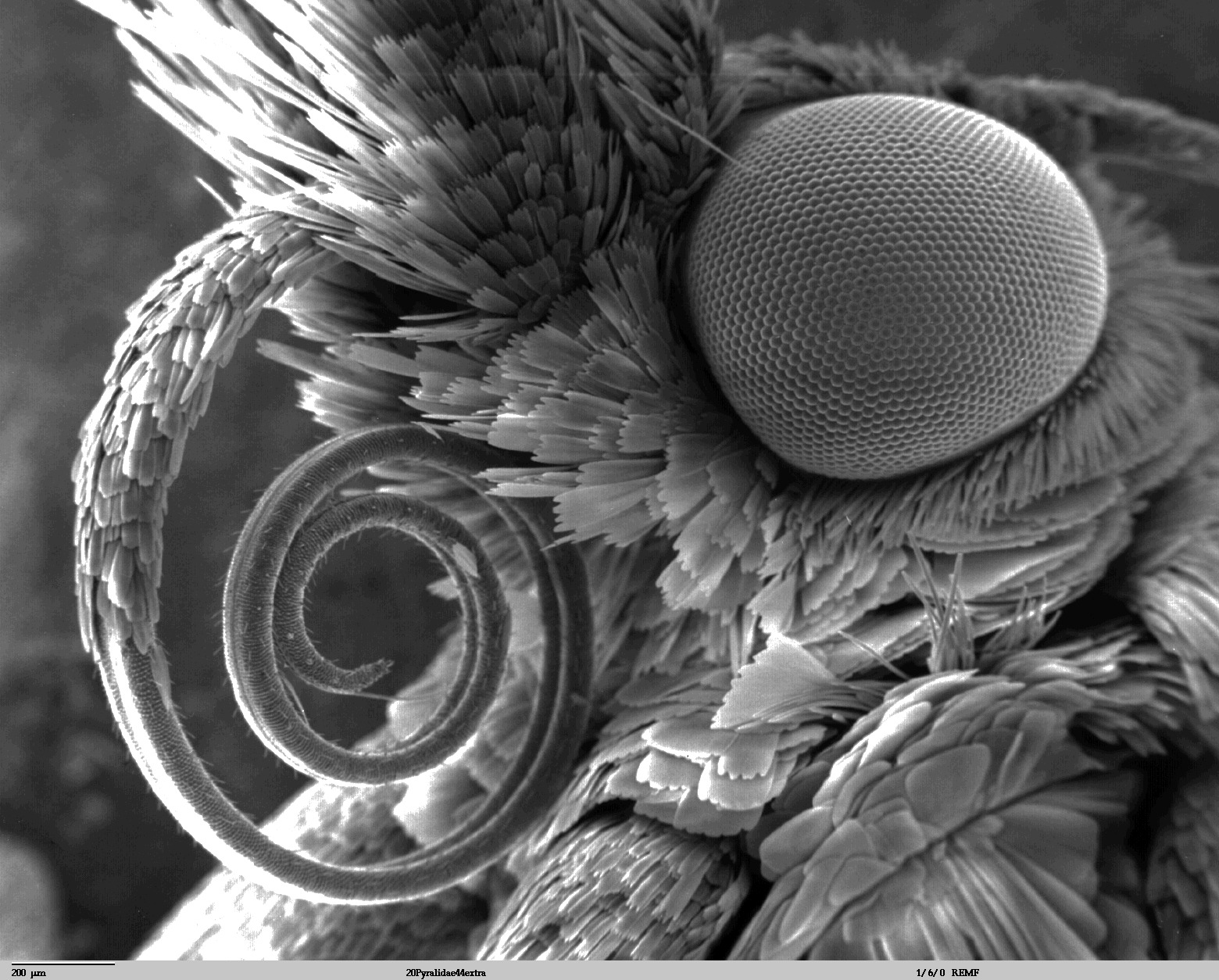
Butterfly tongue

Apart from sponges and placozoans, almost all animals have an internal gut cavity, which is lined with gastrodermal cells. In less advanced invertebrates such as the sea anemone, the mouth also acts as an anus. Circular muscles around the mouth are able to relax or contract in order to open or close it. A fringe of tentacles thrusts food into the cavity and it can gape widely enough to accommodate large prey items. Food passes first into a pharynx and digestion occurs extracellularly in the gastrovascular cavity. Annelids have simple tube-like guts, and the possession of an anus allows them to separate the digestion of their foodstuffs from the absorption of the nutrients. Many molluscs have a radula, which is used to scrape microscopic particles off surfaces. In invertebrates with hard exoskeletons, various mouthparts may be involved in feeding behaviour. Insects have a range of mouthparts suited to their mode of feeding. These include mandibles, maxillae and labium and can be modified into suitable appendages for chewing, cutting, piercing, sponging and sucking. Decapods have six pairs of mouth appendages, one pair of mandibles, two pairs of maxillae and three of maxillipeds. Sea urchins have a set of five sharp calcareous plates, which are used as jaws and are known as Aristotle's lantern.

=== Vertebrates ===
In vertebrates, the first part of the digestive system is the buccal cavity, commonly known as the mouth. The buccal cavity of a fish is separated from the opercular cavity by the gills. Water flows in through the mouth, passes over the gills and exits via the operculum or gill slits. Nearly all fish have jaws and may seize food with them but most feed by opening their jaws, expanding their pharynx and sucking in food items. The food may be held or chewed by teeth located in the jaws, on the roof of the mouth, on the pharynx or on the gill arches.

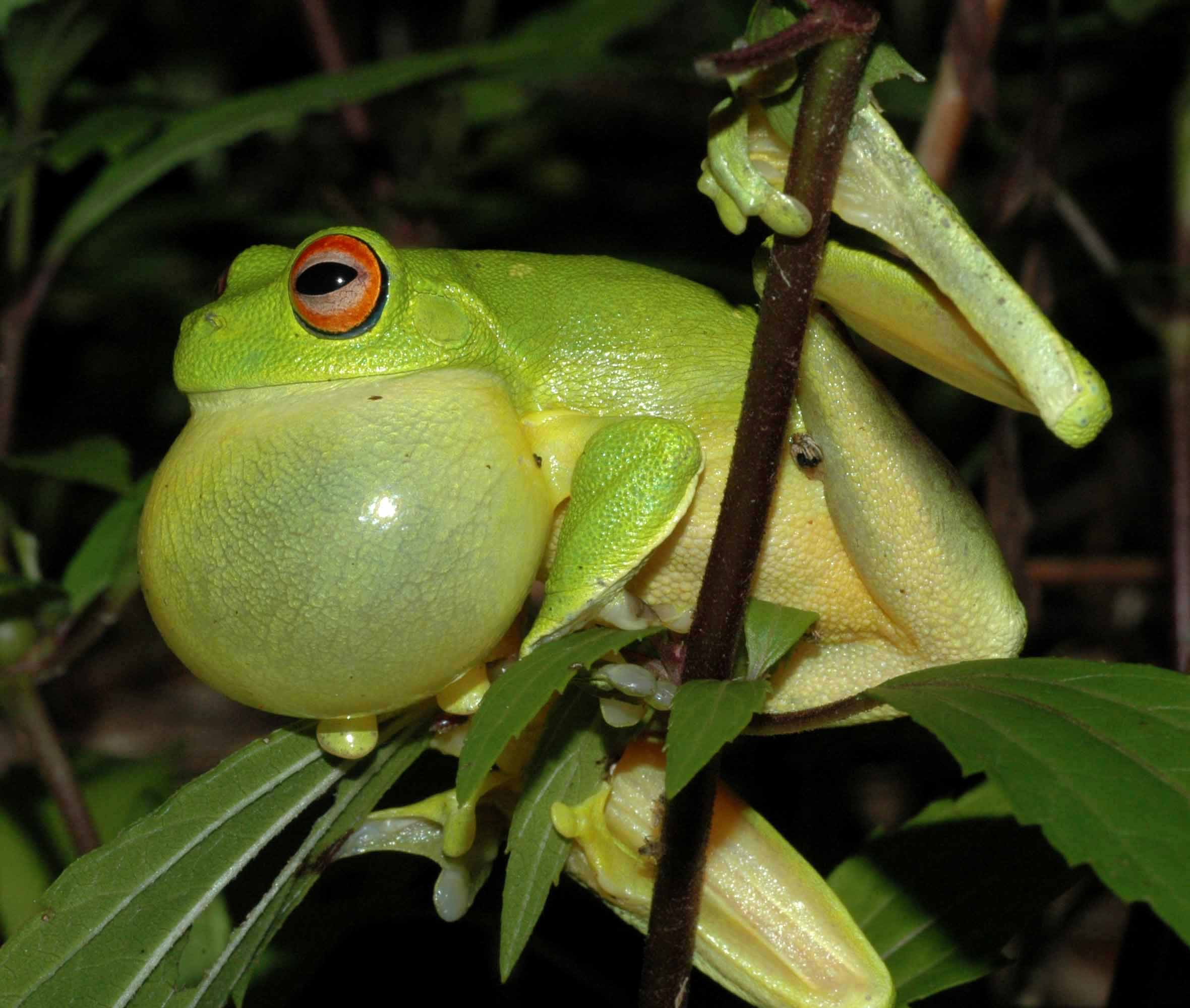
Orange-eyed tree frog calling

Nearly all amphibians are carnivorous as adults. Many catch their prey by flicking out an elongated tongue with a sticky tip and drawing it back into the mouth, where they hold the prey with their jaws. They then swallow their food whole without much chewing. They typically have many small hinged pedicellate teeth, the bases of which are attached to the jaws, while the crowns break off at intervals and are replaced. Most amphibians have one or two rows of teeth in both jaws but some frogs lack teeth in the lower jaw. In many amphibians, there are also vomerine teeth attached to the bone in the roof of the mouth.

The mouths of reptiles are largely similar to those of mammals. The crocodilians are the only reptiles to have teeth anchored in sockets in their jaws. They are able to replace each of their approximately 80 teeth up to 50 times during their lives. Most reptiles are either carnivorous or insectivorous, but turtles are often herbivorous. Lacking teeth suitable for efficient chewing, turtles often have gastroliths in their stomach to further grind the plant material. Snakes have a very flexible lower jaw, the two halves of which are not rigidly attached, and numerous other joints in their skull. These modifications allow them to open their mouths wide enough to swallow their prey whole, even if it is wider than they are.

Birds do not have teeth, relying instead on other means of gripping and macerating their food. Their beaks have a range of sizes and shapes according to their diet and are composed of elongated mandibles. The upper mandible may have a nasofrontal hinge allowing the beak to open wider than would otherwise be possible. The exterior surface of beaks is composed of a thin, horny sheath of keratin. Nectar feeders such as hummingbirds have specially adapted brushy tongues for sucking up nectar from flowers.

Domestic cat meowing

In mammals, the buccal cavity is typically roofed by the hard and soft palates, floored by the tongue and surrounded by the cheeks, salivary glands, and upper and lower teeth. The upper teeth are embedded in the upper jaw and the lower teeth in the lower jaw, which articulates with the temporal bones of the skull. The lips are soft and fleshy folds which shape the entrance into the mouth. The buccal cavity empties through the pharynx into the oesophagus.

== Other functions of the mouth ==
Crocodilians living in the tropics can gape with their mouths to provide cooling by evaporation from the mouth lining. Some mammals rely on panting for thermoregulation as it increases evaporation of water across the moist surfaces of the lungs, the tongue and mouth. Birds also avoid overheating by gular fluttering, flapping the wings near the gular (throat) skin, similar to panting in mammals.

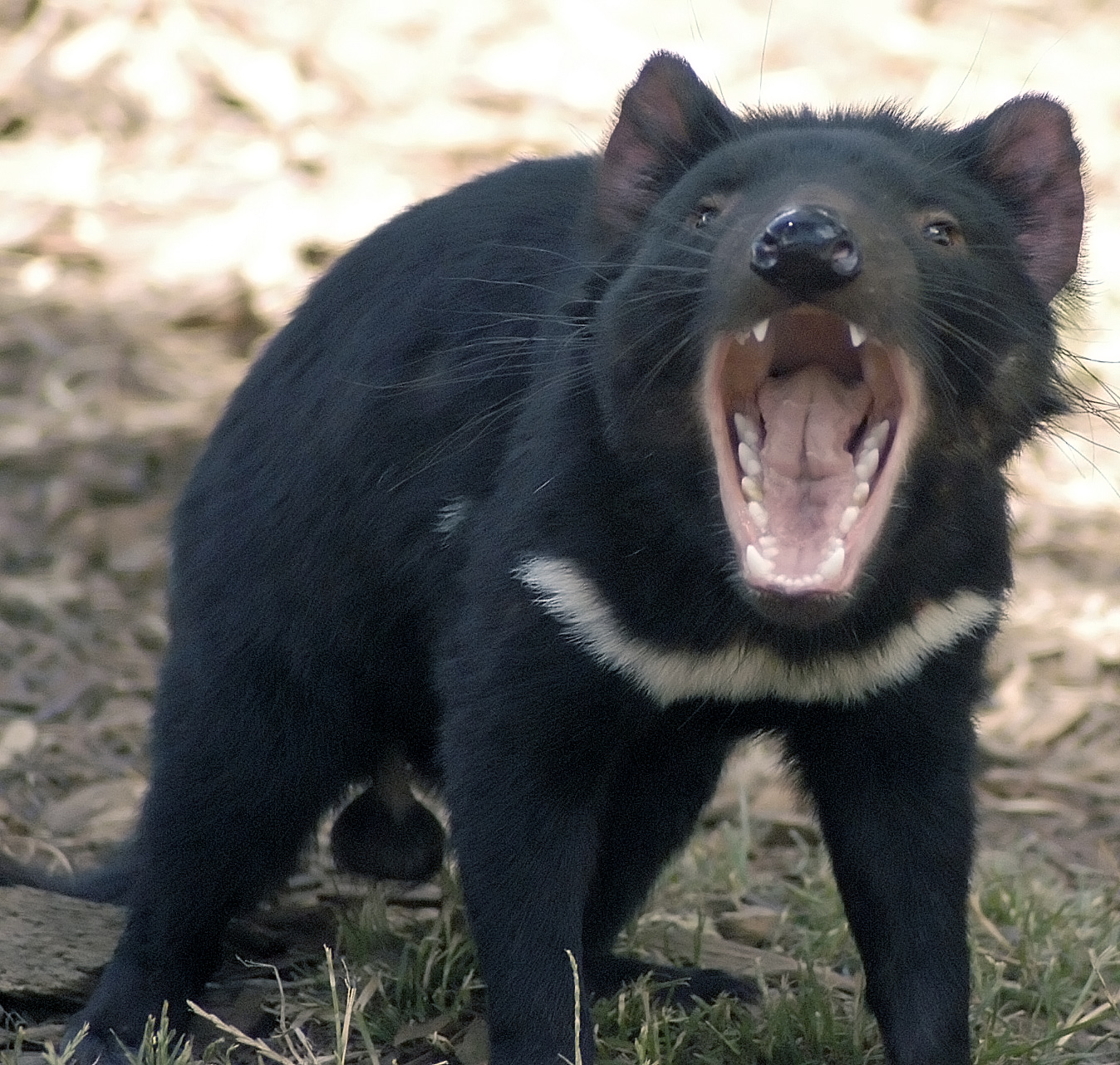
Tasmanian devil in defensive stance

Various animals use their mouths in threat displays. They may gape widely, exhibit their teeth prominently, or flash the startling colours of the mouth lining. This display allows each potential combatant an opportunity to assess the weapons of their opponent and lessens the likelihood of actual combat being necessary.

A number of species of bird use a gaping, open beak in their fear and threat displays. Some augment the display by hissing or breathing heavily, while others clap their beaks.

Mouths are also used as part of the mechanism for producing sounds for communication. To produce sounds, air is forced from the lungs over vocal cords in the larynx. In humans, the pharynx, soft palate, hard palate, alveolar ridge, tongue, teeth and lips are termed articulators and play their part in the production of speech. Varying the position of the tongue in relation to the other articulators or moving the lips restricts the airflow from the lungs in different ways and changes the mouth's resonating properties, producing a range of different sounds. In frogs, the sounds can be amplified using sacs in the throat region. The vocal sacs can be inflated and deflated and act as resonators to transfer the sound to the outside world. A bird's song is produced by the flow of air over a vocal organ at the base of the trachea, the syrinx. For each burst of song, the bird opens its beak and closes it again afterwards. The beak may move slightly and may contribute to the resonance but the song originates elsewhere.

== See also ==
- Oral manifestations of systemic disease
