= Fred Siguier =

French physician (1909–1972)

- Born: 1909
- Died: 1972 (aged 62–63)
- Known for: systemic diseases

Fred Siguier (1909–1972) was a French physician known for his studies about systemic diseases.

== See also ==
- Systemic disease
