= List of diseases by year of discovery =

The following is a list of diseases by year of discovery.

Year	Specialty	Disease	Discoverer	Notes
~2600 BCE	Infectious diseases	Malaria		
~1900 BCE	Infectious diseases	Rabies		
~1600 BCE	Oncology	Cancer		
~1500 BCE	Infectious diseases	Smallpox		
~1500 BCE	Endocrinology	Diabetes		
~410 BCE	Infectious diseases	Mumps		
~400 BCE	Hepatology	Hepatitis		
~300 BCE	Infectious diseases	Dengue fever		
4th century	Infectious diseases	Pneumonia		
9th century	Infectious diseases	Measles	Muhammad ibn Zakariya al-Razi	
14th century	Infectious diseases	African trypanosomiasis	First described by Arab traders	
15th century	Infectious diseases	Typhus		
1798	Ophthalmology	Color blindness	John Dalton	
1798	Neurology	Amyotrophic lateral sclerosis	John Dalton	
1805	Neurology	Meningitis		
1817	Neurology	Parkinson's disease	James Parkinson	
1866	Immunology	Necrotizing arteriolitis		
1872	Neurology	Huntington's disease	George Huntington	
1873	Infectious diseases	Leprosy	Gerhard Armauer Hansen	While Hansen described the bacterium (Mycobacterium leprae) which causes leprosy, the disease was known about as early as 1400 BCE. M. leprae was the first bacterium recognized to cause illness in humans.
1879	Infectious diseases	Psittacosis	Jacob Ritter	Ritter initially described the disease as "pneumotyphus", with "psittacosis" first being used in 1893. The bacterium Chlamydia psittaci was discovered in 1930 by Samuel Bedson and colleagues, though it was misidentified as a virus.
1881	Dermatology	Impetigo	William Fox	
1881	Infectious diseases	Yellow fever	Carlos Finlay	
1882	Infectious diseases	Tuberculosis	Robert Koch	
1885	Infectious diseases	Carrion's disease	Daniel Alcides Carrión	
1906	Neurology	Alzheimer's disease	Alois Alzheimer	
1906	Infectious diseases	Rickettsiosis	Howard Taylor Ricketts	
1909	Infectious diseases	Chagas disease	Carlos Chagas	
1910	Hematology	Sickle-cell disease	James B. Herrick	
1920	Neurology	Creutzfeldt–Jakob disease	Hans Gerhard Creutzfeldt and Alfons Maria Jakob	
1933	Infectious diseases	Influenza	Wilson Smith, Christopher Andrewes and Patrick Laidlaw	
1955	Infectious diseases	Oropouche fever		
1957	Neurology	Kuru	Daniel Carleton Gajdusek	
1958	Infectious diseases	Mpox		
1964	Infectious diseases	Infectious mononucleosis	Anthony Epstein and Yvonne Barr	
1965	Pulmonology	Chronic obstructive pulmonary disease		
1967	Infectious diseases	Marburg virus disease		
1972	Infectious diseases	Norovirus (Gastroenteritis)	Albert Kapikian	
1975	Infectious diseases	Lyme disease		
1976	Infectious diseases	Ebola	Jean-Jacques Muyembe-Tamfum and Peter Piot	
1977	Infectious diseases	Legionnaires' disease	Joseph McDade	
1981	Immunology	HIV/AIDS	Luc Montagnier and Robert Gallo	
1986	Neurology	Fatal insomnia	Elio Lugaresi	
1999	Infectious diseases	Nipah virus infection		
2003	Infectious diseases	Severe acute respiratory syndrome		
2019	Infectious diseases	COVID-19	Li Wenliang	

== See also ==
- Lists of diseases
- List of drugs
- List of drugs by year of discovery
- History of medicine
- History of emerging infectious diseases
