= David Jack (pharmacologist) =

Scottish pharmacologist and medicinal chemist (1924–2011)

Sir David Jack CBE FRS FRSE
- Born: 22 February 1924; Markinch, Fife, Scotland
- Died: 8 November 2011 (aged 87)
- Citizenship: British
- Education: University of Glasgow; Royal Technical College; University of London
- Known for: Drug discovery and development
- Spouse: Lydia Downie Brown (1952–2016)
- Awards: FRSE (1978); CBE (1982); Mullard Award (1991); FRS (1992); Knight Bachelor (1993)
- Scientific career
- Fields: Pharmacology, Medicinal chemistry
- Workplaces: Allen & Hanburys, Glaxo
- Doctoral advisor: Arnold Beckett

Sir David Jack (22 February 1924 – 8 November 2011) was a Scottish pharmacologist and medicinal chemist who specialised in the development of drugs for treating asthma. He was head of research and development at Glaxo from 1978 until 1987.

== Early life and education ==
Jack was born the sixth and youngest child of a coal miner, in Markinch, Fife, Scotland. He attended Buckhaven High School before turning down a place at Edinburgh University to become an apprentice pharmacist. In 1944, having completed his apprenticeship, he began a BSc course in chemistry and pharmacy at the Royal Technical College, Glasgow. He won a number of undergraduate prizes and graduated with first class honours.

== Career ==
He turned down an offer to study for a doctorate and instead worked as an assistant lecturer at the University of Glasgow.

In 1951 he joined the pharmaceutical company Glaxo Laboratories, moving to Smith Kline and French in 1953. In 1961 he became director of research at Allen and Hanburys, a subsidiary of Glaxo, and served as Glaxo's research and development director from 1978 until his official retirement in 1987.

Jack was known for heading a research team which developed the following drugs:

- Beclometasone in 1962
- Salbutamol or Albuterol in 1966,
- Ranitidine in 1977,
- Sumatriptan in 1984,
- Salmeterol or serevent in 1985,
- Ondansetron in 1987,
- and Fluticasone propionate in 1993.

== Honours ==
Jack was appointed a Commander of the Order of the British Empire (CBE) in the 1982 Birthday Honours, and knighted for services to the pharmaceutical industry in 1993.

In 1987, he was awarded an Honorary Degree (Doctor of Science) by the University of Bath.
