= Alfred Bertheim =

German chemist (1879–1914)

Alfred Bertheim (17 April 1879 – 17 August 1914) was a German chemist, best known for his research on arsenic compounds with Paul Ehrlich.

Bertheim was born in 1879 in Berlin and studied chemistry in Strasbourg and Berlin, where he gained his doctorate in 1901, with a thesis "Ueber die fluorescierende Verbindung aus Chlor-alpha-naphtochinonacetessigeste". He served as an assistant to Privy Councilor Liebermann and Professor Rosenheim in Berlin.

In 1904 and 1905, he worked as a manufacturing chemist in Bitterfeld before moving to the Georg-Speyer-Haus in 1906. There, together with Paul Ehrlich, he elucidated the chemical constitution of atoxyl and synthesized innumerable arsenobenzene compounds. He was also responsible for the synthesis of Salvarsan and published "Ein Handbuch der organischen Arsenverbindungen" (A handbook of organic arsenic compounds).

Bertheim enlisted as a war volunteer and died in an accident in Berlin on 17 August 1914.
