= Systemic disease =

Condition which affects multiple organs or the whole body

A systemic disease is one that affects a number of organs and tissues, or affects the body as a whole. It differs from a localized disease, which is a disease affecting only part of the body (e.g., a mouth ulcer).

== Examples ==
- Mastocytosis, including mast cell activation syndrome and eosinophilic esophagitis
- Chronic fatigue syndrome
- Systemic vasculitis e.g. SLE, PAN
- Sarcoidosis – a disease that mainly affects the lungs, brain, joints and eyes, found most often in young African-American women.
- Hypothyroidism – where the thyroid gland produces too little thyroid hormones.
- Diabetes mellitus – an imbalance in blood glucose (sugar) levels.
- Fibromyalgia
- Ehlers-Danlos syndromes - an inherited connective tissue disorder with multiple subcategories
- Adrenal insufficiency – where the adrenal glands don't produce enough steroid hormones
- Coeliac disease – an autoimmune disease triggered by gluten consumption, which may involve several organs and cause a variety of symptoms, or be completely asymptomatic.
- Ulcerative colitis – an inflammatory bowel disease
- Crohn's disease – an inflammatory bowel disease
- Hypertension (high blood pressure)
- Metabolic syndrome
- AIDS – a disease caused by a virus that cripples the body's immune defenses.
- Graves' disease – a thyroid disorder, most often in women, which can cause a goiter (swelling in the front part of the neck) and protruding eyes.
- Systemic lupus erythematosus – a connective tissue disorder involving mainly the skin, joints and kidneys.
- Rheumatoid arthritis – an inflammatory disease which mainly attacks the joints. But can also affect a person's skin, eyes, lungs and mouth.
- Atherosclerosis – a hardening of the arteries
- Sickle cell disease – an inherited blood disorder that can block circulation throughout the body, primarily affecting people of sub-Saharan origin.
- Myasthenia gravis
- Systemic sclerosis
- Sinusitis
- Sjogren's Syndrome - an autoimmune disease that primarily attacks the lacrimal and salivary glands, but also impacts other organs such as the lungs, kidneys, liver, and nervous system.

== Detection ==
Getting a regular eye exam may play a role in identifying the signs of some systemic diseases. "The eye is composed of many different types of tissue. This unique feature makes the eye susceptible to a wide variety of diseases as well as provides insights into many body systems. Almost any part of the eye can give important clues to the diagnosis of systemic diseases. Signs of a systemic disease may be evident on the outer surface of the eye (eyelids, conjunctiva and cornea), middle of the eye and at the back of the eye (retina)."

Since 500 B.C., some researchers have believed that the physical condition of the fingernails and toenails can indicate various systemic diseases. Careful examination of the fingernails and toenails may provide clues to underlying systemic diseases, since some diseases have been found to cause disruptions in the nail growth process. The nail plate is the hard keratin cover of the nail. The nail plate is generated by the nail matrix located just under the cuticle. As the nail grows, the area closest to becoming exposed to the outside world (distal) produces the deeper layers of the nail plate, while the part of the nail matrix deeper inside the finger (proximal) makes the superficial layers. Any disruption in this growth process can lead to an alteration in the shape and texture.

For example, pitting looks like depressions in the hard part of the nail. Pitting is to be associated with psoriasis, affecting 10% - 50% of patients with that disorder. Pitting also may be caused by a variety of systemic diseases, including reactive arthritis and other connective tissue disorders, sarcoidosis, pemphigus, alopecia areata, and incontinentia pigmenti. Because pitting is caused by defective layering of the superficial nail plate by the proximal nail matrix, any localized dermatitis (e.g., atopic dermatitis or chemical dermatitis) that disrupts orderly growth in that area also can cause pitting.

== See also ==
- Disease
- Disseminated disease
- Fred Siguier
- List of systemic diseases with ocular manifestations
- Localized disease
- Marfan syndrome
- Systemic autoimmune diseases
- Systemic inflammation
- Oral manifestations of systemic disease
