= Localized disease =

A localized disease is an infectious or neoplastic process that originates in and is confined to one organ system or general area in the body, such as a sprained ankle, a boil on the hand, an abscess of finger.

A localized cancer that has not extended beyond the margins of the organ involved can also be described as localized disease, while cancers that extend into other tissues are described as invasive. Tumors that are non-hematologic in origin but extend into the bloodstream or lymphatic system are known as metastatic.

Localized diseases are contrasted with disseminated diseases and systemic diseases.

Some diseases are capable of changing from local to disseminated diseases. Pneumonia, for example, is generally confined to one or both lungs but can become disseminated through sepsis, in which the microorganism responsible for the pneumonia "seeds" the bloodstream or lymphatic system and is transported to distant sites in the body. When that occurs, the process is no longer described as a localized disease, but rather as a disseminated disease.

== See also ==
- Disease
- Nosology
