= Vein disorders =

Vascular disease located in a vein

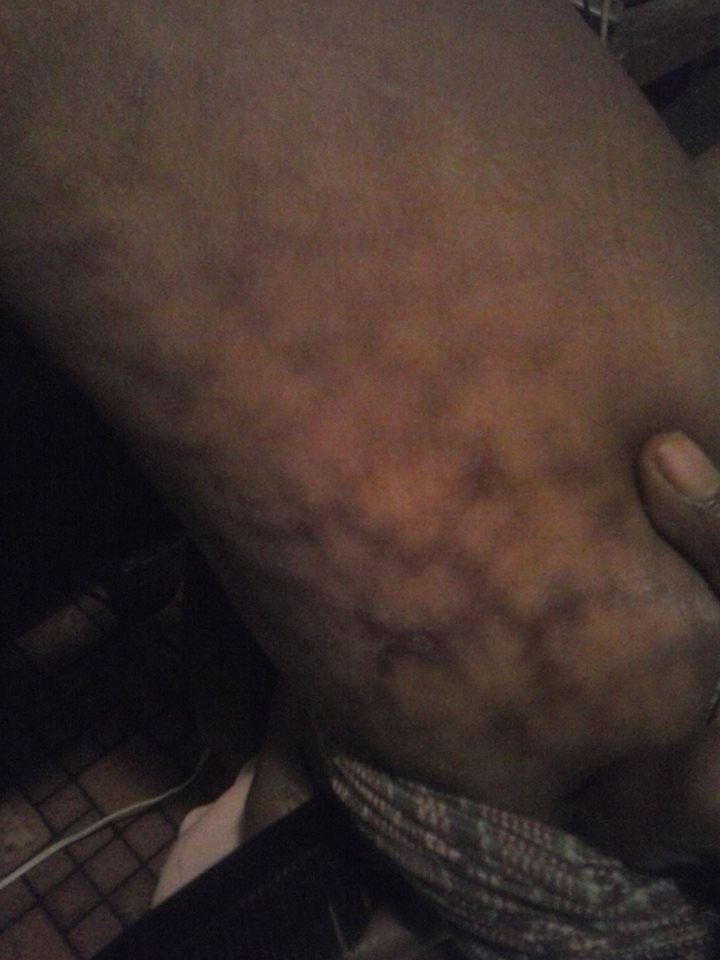
mixed tissue disease

A vein disorder is a class of disease involving veins of the circulatory system.

Common vein disorders include:

- Varicose veins
- Deep vein thrombosis
- Superficial thrombophlebitis
