= Euphorbium =

Euphorbium can also be a synonym of the genus Euphorbia.

Euphorbium, an acrid dull-yellow or brown resin, consisting of the concreted milky juice of several species of Euphorbia, cactus-like perennial plants indigenous to Morocco. It dissolves in alcohol, ether and turpentine; in water it is only slightly soluble. It consists of two or more resins and a substance euphorbone, C_{20}H_{36}O or C_{15}H_{24}O. Pliny the Elder states that the name of the drug was given to it in honor of Euphorbus, the physician of Juba II, king of Mauretania. In former times euphorbium was valued in medicine for its drastic, purgative and emetic properties.

According to Robert Bentley's (botanist) book of Organic Medical Materials from 1887

Euphorbium is in conical, somewhat globular, or irregular pieces or masses, which are sometimes as much as inch across, but mostly much smaller; these have a dull-yellow or yellowish-brown colour, waxy and translucent appearance, and have commonly mixed with them portions of the angular spiny stem of the plant from whence obtained. The pieces are hollow, or enclose fragments of the spines or flowers; they are brittle, have a slight aromatic odor, which is increased by heat, act as a violent sternutatory when powdered, and their taste is very acrid and burning.

The latex of Euphorbia resinifera contains Resiniferatoxin, an ultra potent capsaicin analog. Desensitization to resiniferatoxin is tested in clinical trials to treat neuropathic pain.
