= Disseminated disease =

Disease classification

Disseminated disease can refer to disseminated cancer which is the movement of cancerous cells from the original tumor to other areas of the body, or disseminated infection which is the pathogen's entry into the host, growth, and dissemination, which results in illness.

After exiting the main tumor, cancer cells circulate throughout the body. They are known as circulating tumor cells once they are in the blood. Few circulating tumor cells can disseminate to distant locations and remain tumor cells. The amount of disseminated tumor cells that can develop into metastases is even lower.

== See also ==
- Metastasis
- Localized disease
