= Allen & Hanburys =

British pharmaceutical manufacturer

- Industry: Pharmaceutical
- Founded: 1715; 310 years ago
- Founder: Silvanus Bevan
- Defunct: 1958; 67 years ago
- Fate: Acquired by Glaxo Laboratories
- Headquarters: Lombard Street, London

Allen and Hanburys Ltd was a British pharmaceutical manufacturer, absorbed by Glaxo Laboratories in 1958. GlaxoSmithKline, its successor company, used the Allen and Hanburys name for the specialist respiratory division until beginning to phase it out in 2013. In 2021, the name was trademarked in the United States as part of the formation of Allen & Hanburys Inc., an American pharmaceutical and consumer products company focused on Pediatrics, Dermatology and Respiratory Care exclusively within the United States.

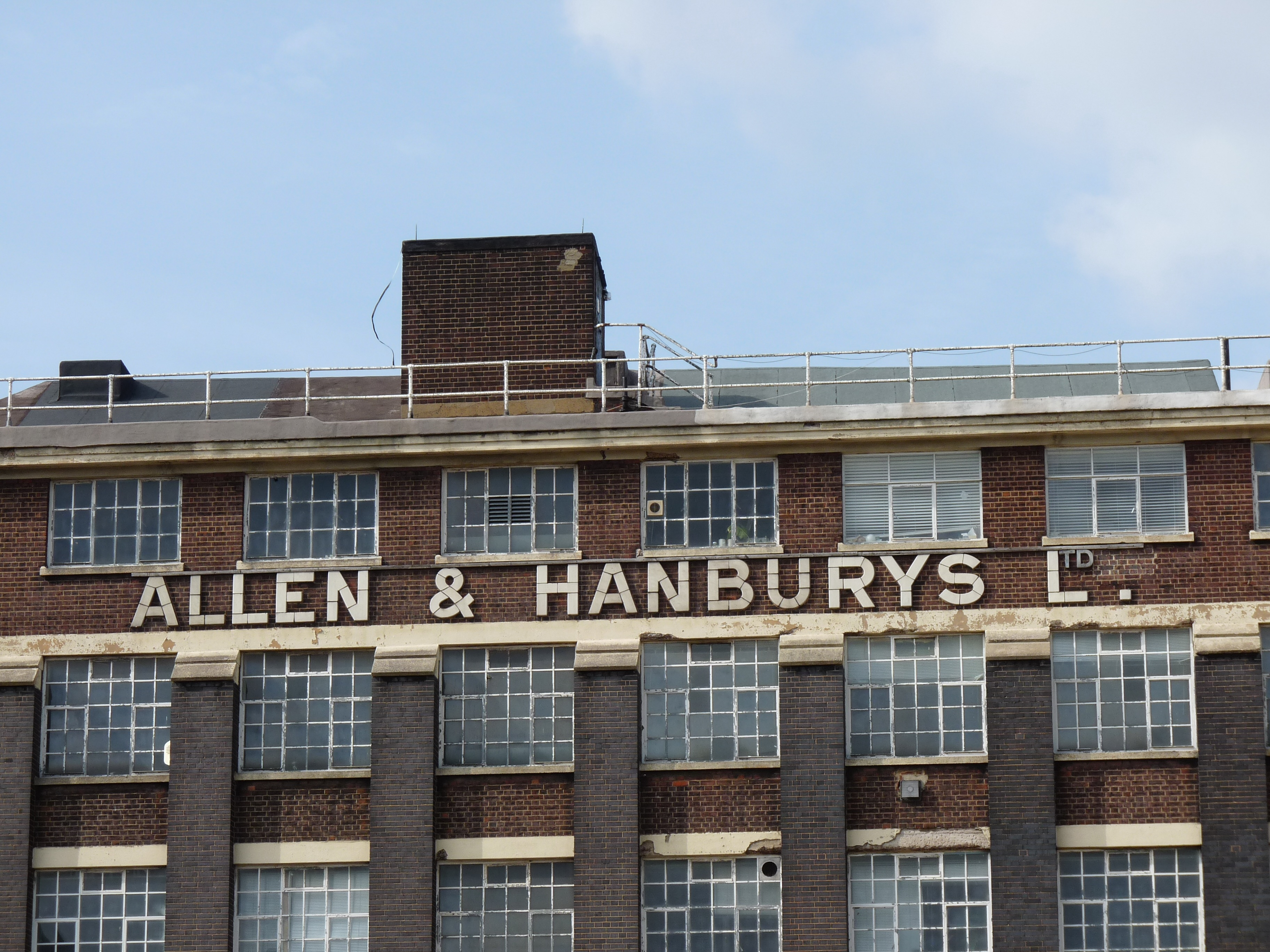
Allen & Hanburys Ltd, Bethnal Green, London, UK

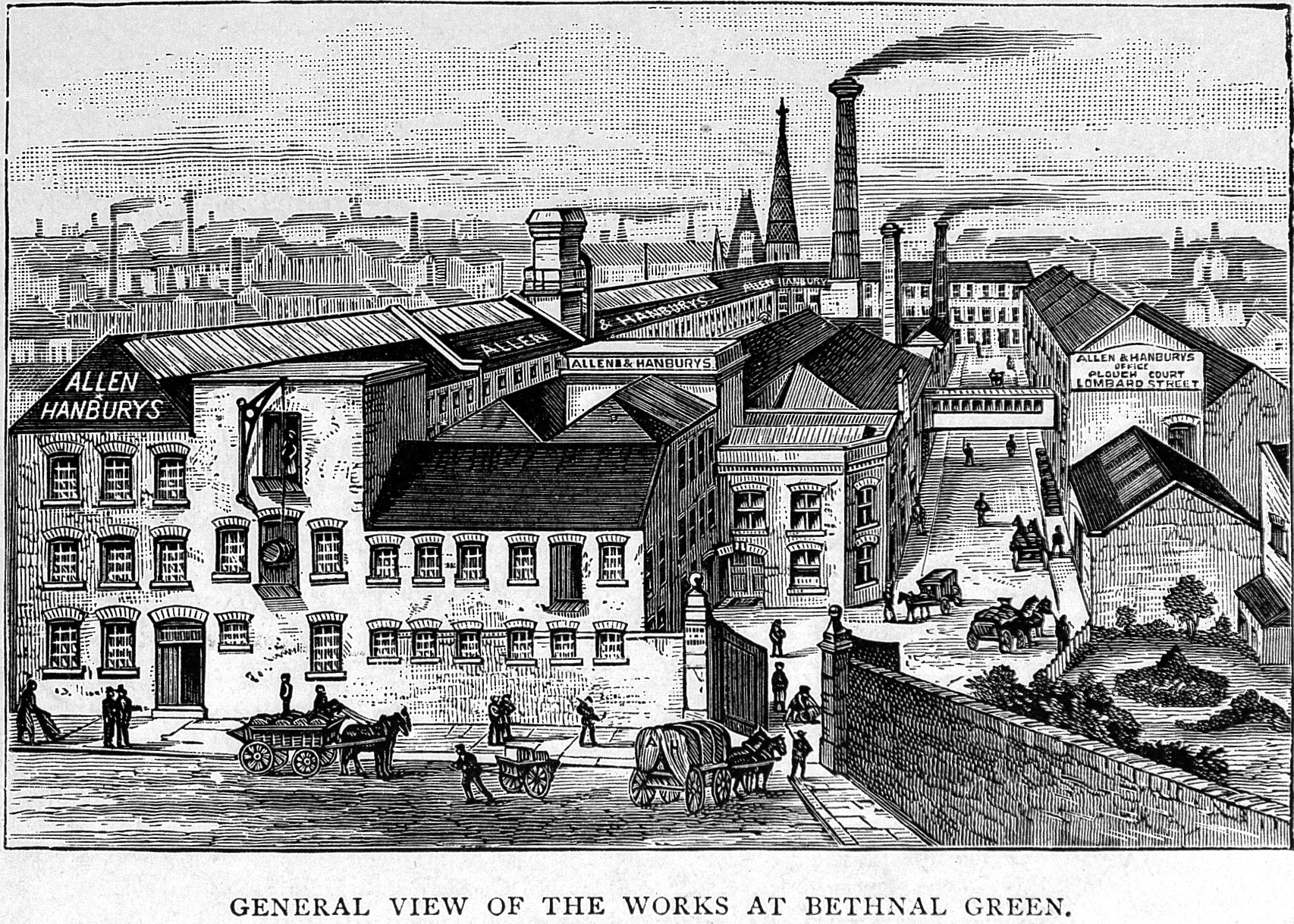
Picture of the Allen & Hanburys factory at Bethnal Green

== History ==
The business was founded in 1715 in Old Plough Court, Lombard Street, London, by Silvanus Bevan, a Welshman, apothecary and a Quaker. Bevan and his brother, Timothy, who became his partner and later succeeded him, were known for their just dealings and the integrity and quality of their drugs. The company grew into a respected pharmaceutical centre and had established a strong reputation with American doctors by the late 18th century. The West Indies was also an important destination for their products.

William Allen, FRS, also a Quaker, and a well known scientist, joined the firm in 1792 and rose quickly to become the dominant personality. His second wife was a member of the Hanbury family – who had produced several learned scientists. On Allen's death, the Hanbury family assumed control of the company.

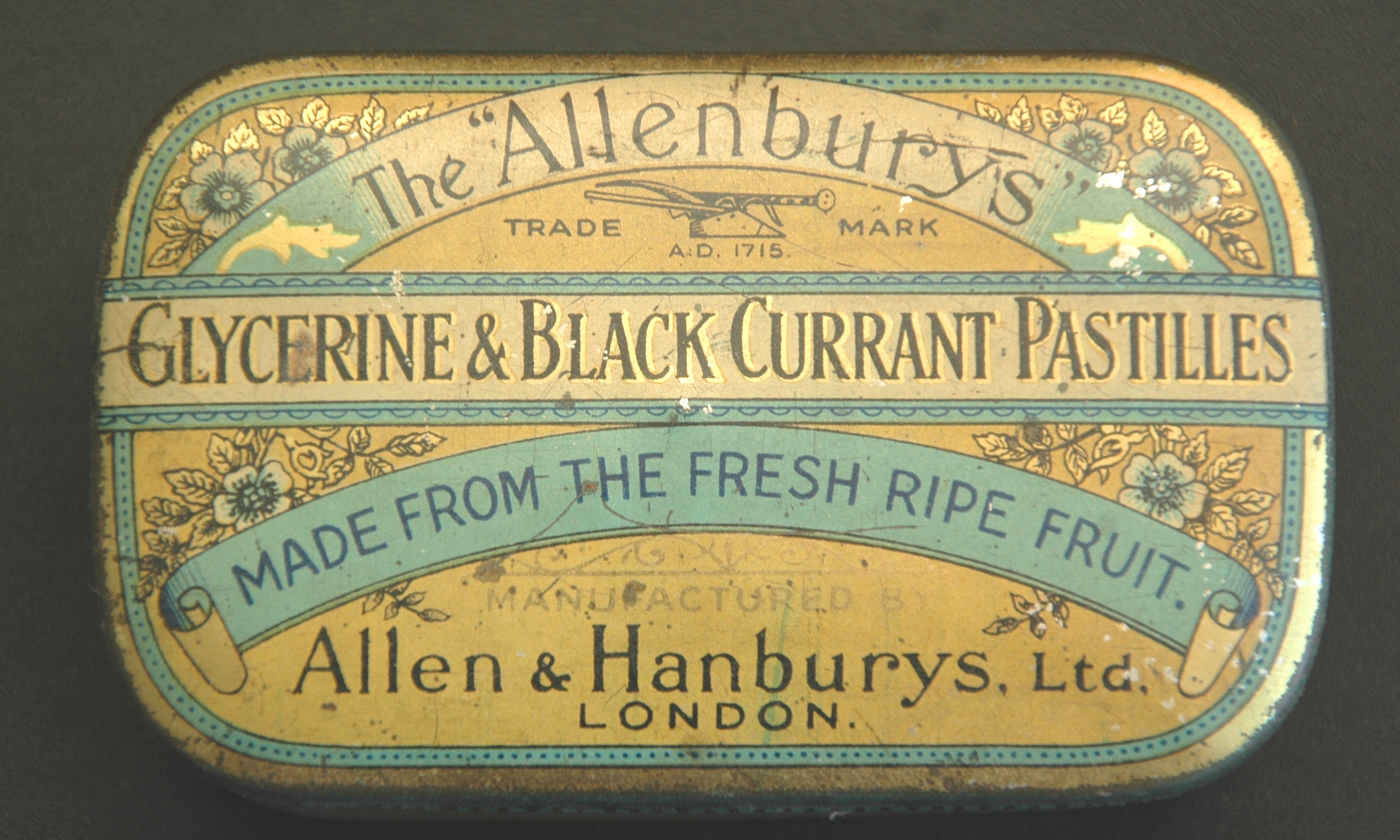
Tin for "Allenburys" blackcurrant pastilles

Daniel Hanbury, FRS a pharmacologist, and also a partner, was instrumental in making the name of Allen and Hanburys still more well known due to his correspondence with scientists all over the world.

Growth of the company was continuous, but it was in the second part of the 19th century that developments on a large scale took place. Factories were built at Ware, Hertfordshire, and Bethnal Green in east London.

The factory at Ware specialised in infants' foods, dietetic products, medicated pastilles, malt preparations as well as galenical preparations, beginning production in 1892. The brands included Allenburys Nº1 and Nº2 foods (essentially milk foods for babies up to six months), and Allenburys Nº 3 (malted farinaceous food, six months and older). Allenburys Diet was a "stimulating beverage" for invalids, convalescents and the aged. Allenburys Rusks were a suitable first solid food for infants.

Allenburys claimed to be pioneers in Great Britain in the production of pastilles, and thus the Ware factory also produced Allenburys Glycerine and Black Currant Pastilles, amongst another 80 different kinds of medicated and crystallised pastilles.

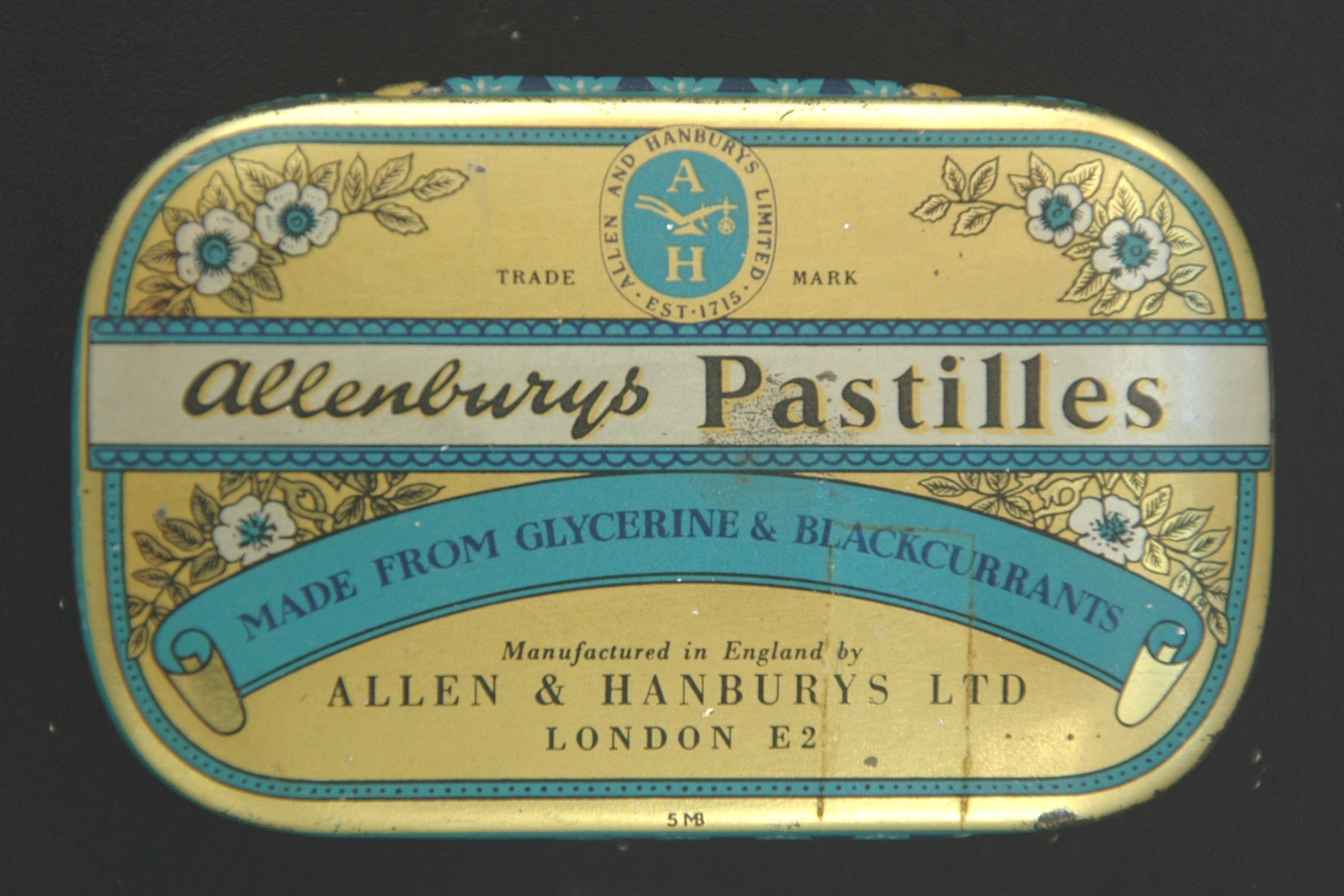
Later design of tin for "Allenburys" blackcurrant pastilles

Malt preparations and malt extract were also made at Ware, including "Byno" preparations, malt extract with cod liver oil. Some appeared under the name of Allenburys Bynol, Torch, Brand Malt and Oil, often specially packed for chemists and other dealers bearing their own name and address.

Allen and Hanburys was one of the first manufacturers of cod liver oil in Great Britain, and owned factories in the Lofoten Islands (Norway) as well as at Hull and Aberdeen taking cod directly from the North Sea.

The Bethnal Green factory carried much of the administrative and scientific side of the business, which included research, analytical control, chemistry, pharmacy and pharmacology. In this plant, galenical preparations, pills, tablets, capsules and other classes of pharmaceutical and medical goods were prepared.

The Bethnal Green plant also produced surgical instruments, mainly in stainless steel, and included "Barts" operating tables. Another product was the Cromwell House Super Sensitive Baby Scale (weighing scales made from cast iron) designed for accurately weighing babies during test feeding or research.

The company had overseas branches in Lindsay, Ontario, Durban, India, Shanghai, Australia and Buenos Aires, and agencies in many other countries. The company address was for many years at 37 Lombard Street, London EC.

Allen & Hanburys launched the first selective β_{2}-receptor agonist, Ventolin (i.e. salbutamol), in 1968. The drug was an instant success, and has been used to treat asthma ever since.

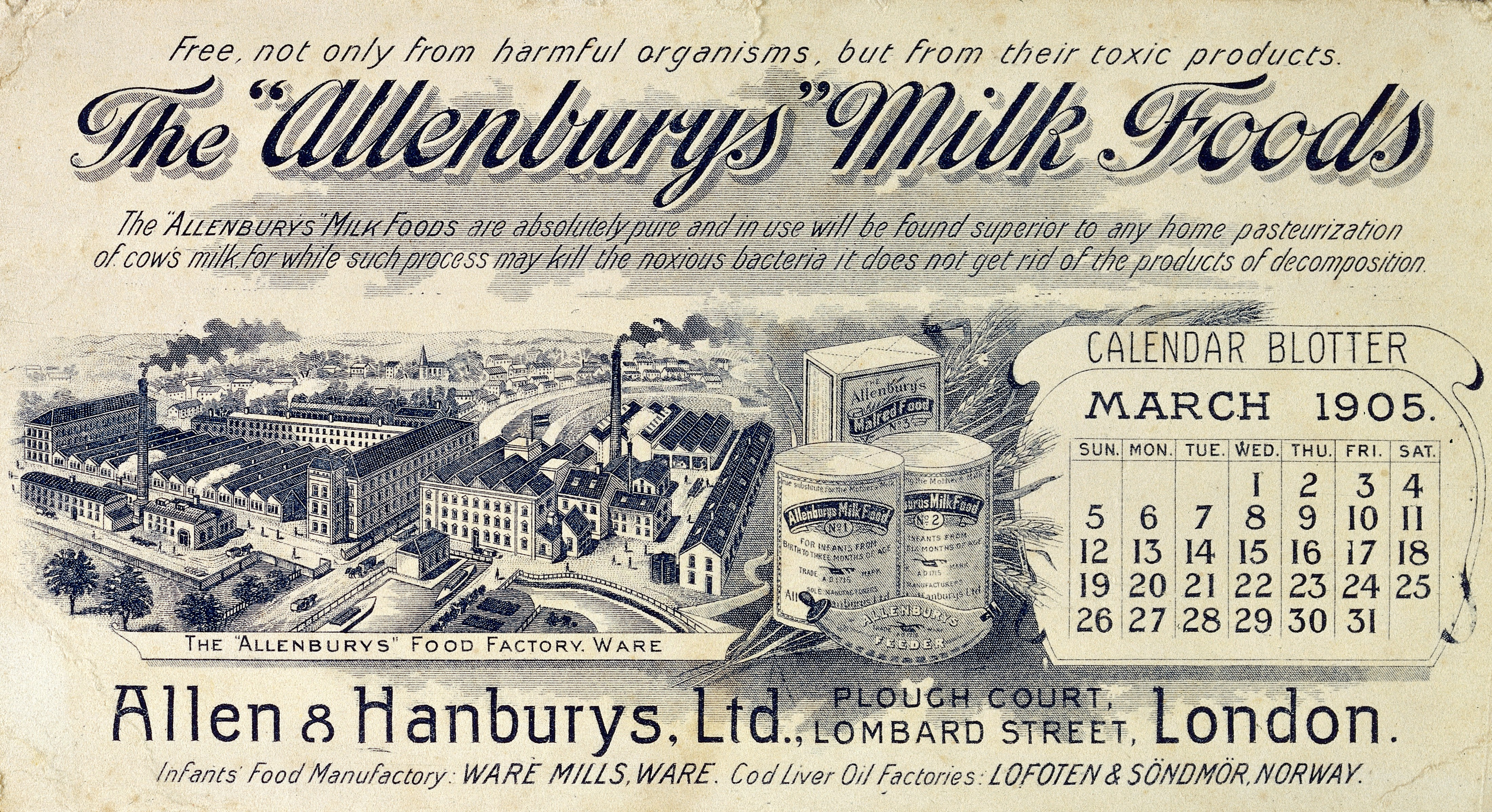
Calendar blotter advertising The "Allenburys" milk foods, from London 1905.

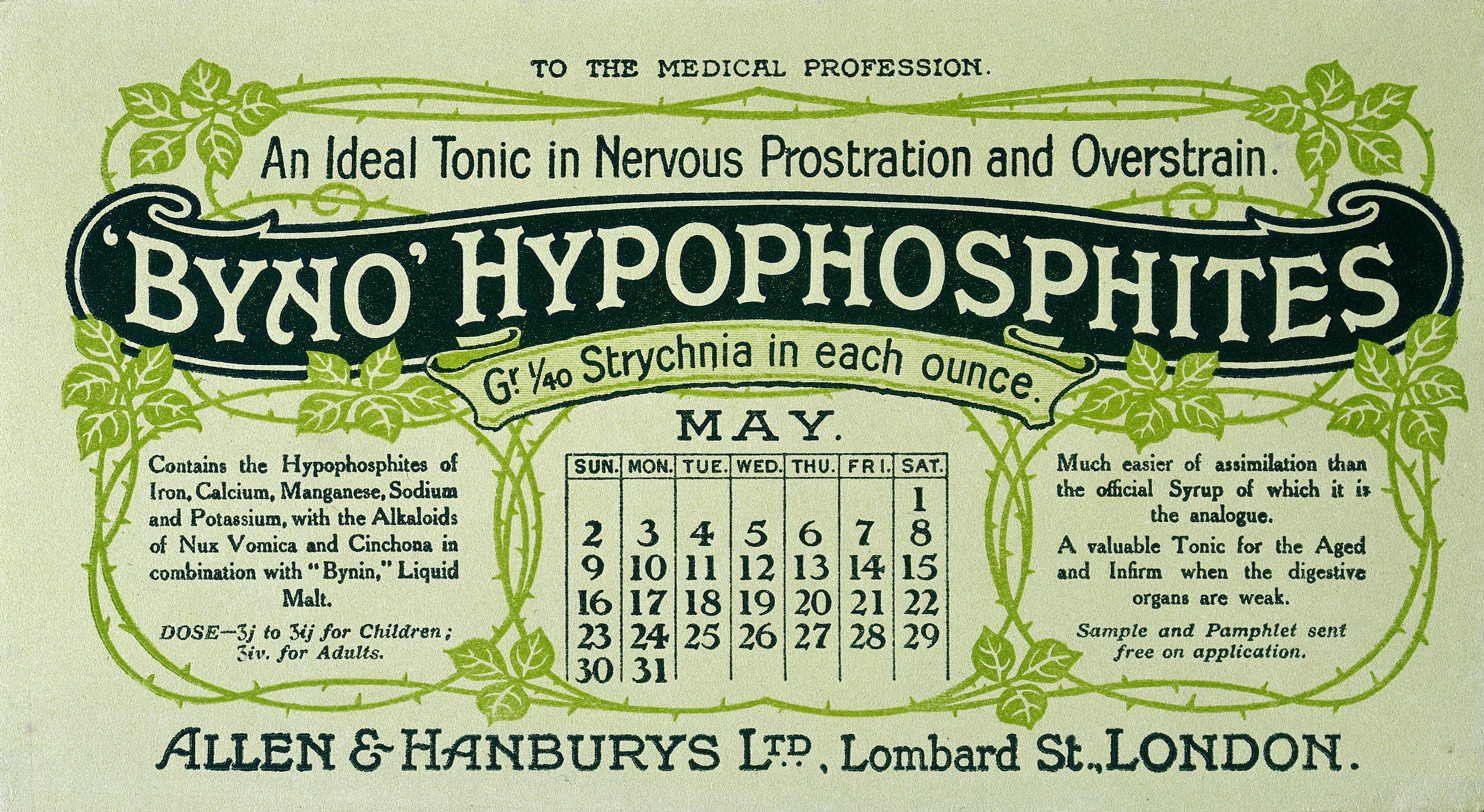
Blotter advertising "Byno" hypophosphates for Allen & Hanburys Ltd, from London 1909

== See also ==
- Pharmaceutical industry in the United Kingdom

== Sources ==
- Cope, Zachary (5 February 1955). "Allen and Hanburys, 1715–1954". British Medical Journal. 1 (4909): 337. doi:10.1136/bmj.1.4909.337-b. ISSN 0959-8138. PMC 2060881. Summary review of the company's history by Zachary Cope.
