= Driclor =

Strong anti-perspirant

Driclor is a strong anti-perspirant manufactured by Stiefel Laboratories (UK) and produced in Sligo, Ireland. Driclor is similar to other strong anti-perspirants using 20% aluminium chloride hexahydrate as the active ingredient. However, the aluminum salts may irritate the skin, a common side effect is puritis (itching).

Driclor is sold only as a roll-on application bottle. It has a pharmacological classification of 'anti-perspirant'.
