= Profetamine =

Generic form of amphetamine sulfate

Profetamine is the name of a generic form of amphetamine sulfate which was introduced in the 1940s. Apparently, it was a counterfeit of the patented SKF Benzedrine Sulfate tablets that were available at the time.

== See also ==
- Gordon Alles
- Benzedrine
- Amphetamine
