= Bulk-sale restriction =

Bulk-sale restrictions — also known as bulk-sale restraints, finished-form limitations and dosage-form limitations — are, as the term is used in United States antitrust case law, clauses in patent licenses that provide that the licensee shall make and sell the licensed product only in "finished pharmaceutical form" or "dosage form" (such as tablets, capsules and vials—the form in which drugs are administered to humans), not in bulk. Bulk form is the form in which drug chemicals are manufactured by chemical or other processes. These clauses are found primarily in pharmaceutical product licenses and are used to keep active drug ingredients out of the hands of generic manufacturers and price-cutters.

== Antitrust cases ==
The United States Supreme Court explained in United States v. Glaxo Group Ltd. the reason why drug companies seek to prevent bulk sales:

Bulk sales would create new competition among wholesalers, by enabling other companies to convert the bulk drug into dosage . . . forms and sell to retail outlets, and would presumably lead to price reductions as the result of normal competitive forces. There is, in fact, substantial evidence in the record to the effect that other drug companies would not only have entered the market, had they been able to make bulk purchases, but also would have charged substantially lower wholesale prices for the dosage . . . forms of the drug.

In addition to the Glaxo case, other antitrust cases in which U.S. courts have held the use of bulk-sale restrictions illegal under the antitrust laws include United States v. CIBA Geigy Corp. In that case the Government challenged both sales of bulk drug chemical and manufacturing licenses each with both bulk-sales restrictions and limitations to marketing the drug in a specific combination with another drug (for example, Ciba's patented hydrochlorothiazide plus Carter's meprobamate). The Government had two principal legal theories: (1) each agreement was a "contract, combination, or conspiracy" in violation of Sherman Act § 1; (2) the "network" of agreements amounted to a hub-and-spoke conspiracy. The district court found:

The proof in this case has shown a series of supply agreements which limit, in varying degrees, the range of uses to which the purchaser was entitled to put the vended material. Although these contracts were reached in a vertical, supplier-purchaser, context, they, in fact, were designed to limit horizontal competition between CIBA and its vendees. Such agreements are more pernicious antitrust violations than simple vertical restraints, for, as a result of them, "cartel activity then co-exists with the attempt to vertically control the discretion of the independent businessman." Where it is shown, as it is here, that a vertically imposed restraint is intended to suppress horizontal competition, the court will treat the agreement as the equivalent of a horizontal restraint of trade.

However, the district court held that the hub-and-spoke conspiracy was rimless and therefore not proved. That is, the evidence did not show communication among the spokes or their awareness of one another's identities or acts. The court also rejected the whole claim that the manufacturing licenses violated the Sherman Act. It held them shielded by the General Talking Pictures doctrine.

== Commercial law ==
In commercial law, the term "bulk sale" has a different meaning. It refers to a sale "not in the ordinary course of business" of much ("a major part") of a merchant's goods (such as more than half) in stock. Usually, the buyer must record notice of the transaction in order not to be liable to creditors of the seller whose claims might be defeated by the transfer of the seller's goods. The purpose of the law is to prevent fraudulent transfers. This field is generally governed by the Uniform Commercial Code.
