= Gordon Alles =

American chemist and pharmacologist (1901–1963)

Gordon A. Alles
- Born: Gordon A. Alles; November 26, 1901
- Died: January 21, 1963 (aged 61)
- Citizenship: American
- Education: California Institute of Technology
- Occupations: Chemist, pharmacologist
- Known for: Discovering the physiological effects of amphetamines

Gordon A. Alles (November 26, 1901 – January 21, 1963), was an American chemist and pharmacologist who did extensive research on the isolation and properties of insulin for the treatment of diabetics. He is also credited with discovering and publishing the physiological effects of amphetamine and methylenedioxyamphetamine (MDA). He is the first person to have prepared amphetamine sulfate, although not the amphetamine freebase. Alles first reported the physiological properties of amphetamine as a synthetic analog of ephedrine, and therefore received credit for this discovery. He enjoyed large royalties from Smith, Kline & French (SKF) because he sold his patent rights for amphetamine to the company and it enjoyed large sales. Several popular products sold by SKF contained amphetamine, including Benzedrine pills and inhalers, Dexedrine pills and Dexamyl tablets. Counterfeit drugs such as Profetamine (a generic form of amphetamine sulfate) appeared, aiming to circumvent Alles' 'weak' patent.

== Career ==
Alles received his BS (1922), MS (1924), and PhD (1926) degrees from California Institute of Technology (Caltech). From 1931 he was a lecturer in pharmacology at the University of California Medical School in San Francisco, and from 1951 he was Professor in Residence of pharmacology at UCLA. From 1934 to 1951 he was a consultant for the SKF laboratories. He was owner of the Alles Chemical Research Laboratories in Pasadena, and had been a Caltech research associate since 1939. In 1958 he gave Caltech a gift of $350,000 which financed, in large part, the five-story Gordon A. Alles Laboratory for Molecular Biology.

Alles was primarily interested in natural and synthetic drug chemicals and the relationship between their molecular structures and their biological actions. In 1928 he discovered the physiological properties of benzedrine (amphetamine) and he contributed to its development as a drug. This drug and dextroamphetamine, which was developed from the discovery, have had worldwide medical use as general brain stimulants.

Alles discovered the psychoactive effects of 3,4-methylenedioxyamphetamine (MDA), a mescaline analogue and the first synthetic psychedelic as well as the first entactogen, in 1930. He co-discovered MMDA (5-methoxy-MDA), another one of the earliest synthetic psychedelics, in 1962, with psychedelic chemist Alexander Shulgin independently synthesizing the drug the same year.

Alles also spent time in Tahiti, where he was investigating the possibilities of developing tranquilizers from a native drink called kava.

== Quote from On Speed ==
Gordon Alles never lived to see the downfall of his invention in both medical doctrine and popular opinion. Perhaps inspired by the psychic effects he discovered in methylenedioxyamphetamine (MDA, the original ecstasy) in 1930, Alles devoted almost the whole of his career to mind-altering drugs. In the 1930s and early 1940s, while still working closely with SKF, he produced hallucinogens related to amphetamine and mescaline, including MDA, for the firm to test in low doses as diet drugs and antidepressants. Alles also worked with SKF at isolating medically useful drugs from cannabis. Starting in the late 1950s, having become an honorary pharmacology professor at the medical school of the University of California, Los Angeles, he worked on developing hallucinogenic amphetamines such as MDA and even more powerful derivatives, partly funded by the U.S. Army’s chemical warfare program. He investigated hallucinogenic and stimulant chemicals in the Khat plant, starting with a 1955 expedition to Ethiopia to study how it was used in traditional medicine. In January 1963, upon returning from a Tahiti trip to investigate the traditional Kava root as a source of new tranquilizers, Alles died. The cause of death of this biochemist who had begun his career by studying insulin was, ironically, diabetes, a disease Alles never knew he had. Insulin could have saved his life, of course, but no matter how marvelous a drug may be in itself, it is only beneficial when accompanied by the right diagnosis and prescription.

== See also ==
- List of psychedelic chemists
