= John K. Smith =

John K. Smith (c. 1805–1845) was an American pharmacist and businessman. He founded the pharmaceutical company John K. Smith & Co., which became a part of Smith, Kline and French and GlaxoSmithKline.

Smith trained as a druggist, and joined his brother-in-law, John Gilbert, in 1830 to open a dispensing chemist at 296 North Second Street in Philadelphia. Together they sold drugs, paints, varnish, chemicals and window glass.

When John K. Smith retired, the business was taken over by his son, George K. Smith, who expanded it into a large international business.

John K. Smith died in 1845 and was interred at Laurel Hill Cemetery.
