= Smith, Kline & French =

Former American pharmaceutical company

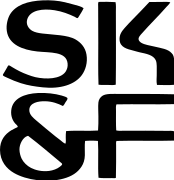
- Industry: Pharmaceutical
- Founded: 1830
- Founder: John K. Smith
- Defunct: 1989; 36 years ago
- Fate: Merged with The Beecham Group plc to form SmithKline Beecham
- Successor: SmithKline Beecham (1989–2000); GlaxoSmithKline (2000–2022); GSK plc (2022–Present)

Smith, Kline & French (SKF) was an American pharmaceutical company that is now a part of the British group GSK plc.

== History ==
In 1830, John K. Smith opened a drugstore in Philadelphia, and his younger brother, George, joined him in 1841 to form John K Smith & Co. In 1865, Mahlon Kline joined the company, as a bookkeeper. In 1875, he took on additional responsibilities as a salesman and added many new and large accounts, as a reward the company, Mahlon K Smith and Company, was renamed into Smith, Kline and Company.

In 1891, Smith, Kline and Company acquired French, Richards and Company, founded in 1844 by Clayton French and William Richards, which provided the company with a greater portfolio of consumer brands. The combined business became the Smith, Kline and French Company.

In 1932, SKF chemist Gordon Alles was awarded a patent for amphetamine.

In 1968, the company acquired Recherche et Industrie Thérapeutiques in Belgium.

SmithKline acquired Allergan in 1982, an eye and skincare business, and merged with Beckman Instruments, Inc., a company specialising in diagnostics and measurement instruments and supplies. After the merger the company was renamed SmithKline Beckman.

SmithKline Beckman and Beecham Group merged in 1989 to form SmithKline Beecham plc. In 2000, SmithKline Beecham merged with Glaxo Wellcome to form GlaxoSmithKline (GSK).
