= Mahlon Kline =

Mahlon N. Kline (6 February 1846 – 27 November 1909) was an American pharmacist who was president and general manager of Smith Kline & Co.

== Career ==
Born in Windsor Township in Pennsylvania, Mahlon Kline was educated at a local school in Upper Bern. He qualified as a teacher and briefly taught at a school at Hyde Park. He then went to the Eastman Business College at Poughkeepsie.

In 1865 he joined Smith & Shoemaker: Mr Shoemaker resigned in 1869 and in 1875 the business became Smith Kline & Co. Under Mahlon Kline's leadership it became the third largest pharmaceutical business in the United States.

He was active in local business affairs and, in 1900, became a director of the local Bourse. He was also active in State politics and in 1905 he became treasurer of the State Committee of the Lincoln Party.

He died in 1909.

== Family ==
In 1874 he married Isadora E. Unger and together they went on to have two daughters, Isadora Caroline Kline and Leah Elizabeth Kline, and one son, Clarence Mahlon Kline.
