= Stiefel Laboratories =

American corporation

Stiefel Laboratories Inc.
- Company type: Subsidiary
- Industry: Pharmaceuticals
- Founded: 1847; 179 years ago, in Germany
- Founder: John David Stiefel
- Area served: Worldwide
- Key people: Simon Jose (president)
- Parent: GSK plc

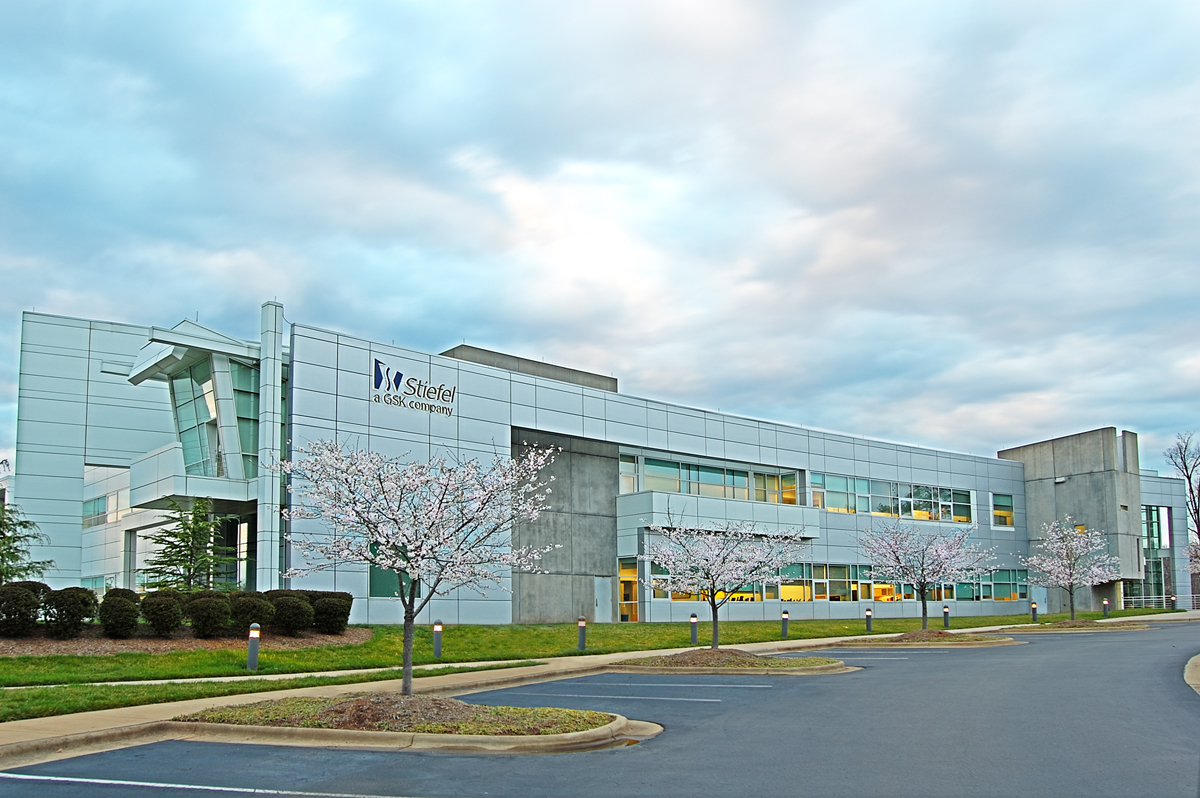
Global headquarters, Research Triangle Park, North Carolina

Stiefel Laboratories Inc. was an American dermatological pharmaceutical company, with its global headquarters in Research Triangle Park, North Carolina. It makes products such as Duac and Oilatum. Stiefel was acquired by GSK plc at a price of $2.9 billion. The company was founded in 1847 by John David Stiefel, who initially created medicated soaps.

== Early history ==
The company's origins lie in the J.D. Stiefel Company which was established in 1847, in Germany, by John David Stiefel; its first products were candles but the company began making medicated soaps within several years of its founding. In the 1880s, the company began worldwide export of its products.

The company's products were brought to the United States for the first time by August C. Stiefel, the grandson of J.D. Stiefel (the founder), in 1910 and named the company Stiefel Medicinal Soap Co., Inc.

By 1914, Stiefel produced 103 different toilet, perfumed, and medicinal soaps and were packaged in seven different languages.

One of J.D. Stiefel Company's original products in the 1920s, was called Stiefel Freckle Soap. In early advertisements, Freckle Soap claimed to wash "freckles and unsightly tan" away. At this time, soaps were packaged in tins to prolong the product's shelf life.

== 1940s–1960s ==
In 1947 the business was resurrected, and registered in the State of New York under the name the Stiefel Medicinal Soap Company, Inc., initially operating from a former creamery in Oak Hill, New York. As the product line grew and diversified beyond medicinal soaps, the company was renamed Stiefel Laboratories, Inc.

In 1948, the Stiefel Medicinal Soap Company worked with dermatologists to develop the Oilatum family of products, which treat dry skin and atopic dermatitis.

In 1959, Zeasorb has the ability to absorb six times its weight in moisture. Stiefel developed Zeasorb products with dermatologists, who identified the need for such a powder.

Introduced in 1960, Polytar first featured the combination of tars in a shampoo.

In 1966, Stiefel introduced the first benzoyl peroxide product for acne—Sulfoxyl Lotion (5% benzoyl peroxide, 2% sulfur). The treatment was introduced to Canadian dermatologists as BenOxyl Lotion.

As the Stiefel Medicinal Soap Company's product line grew and diversified beyond medicinal soaps, the company name was changed to Stiefel Laboratories, Inc. At that time, all production was done at the Oak Hill, New York, facility. Eventually its network of distributors, subsidiaries and manufacturing facilities in other countries allowed the company to manufacture and distribute products around the globe. During the 1960s, sales and manufacturing operations expanded to include Canada, Puerto Rico, Germany, Hong Kong, the United Kingdom, Costa Rica, the Philippines, Ireland and other locations. By 1969, non-US international sales had reached $200,000.

== 1970s–2000 ==
In the 1970s, the company expanded into South and Central America, the Caribbean, and France. The distributorship in Canada became a subsidiary, and manufacturing operations began in Sligo, Ireland. Between 1970 and 1979, the company averaged fifty percent growth every year and sales grew to $10.4 million.

In 1977, the headquarters were relocated to Coral Gables, Florida.

During the 1980s, Stiefel's first research and development facility outside of the US was established in 1985 in Slough, a town near the company's United Kingdom headquarters. It was later moved to Maidenhead.

Another R&D facility was established in Brazil. At the close of the 1980s international sales had grown to nearly $50 million. The company's operations continued to expand and by the 1990s Stiefel Laboratories had subsidiaries in more than 30 countries and relationships with distributors in 70 others. By the end of the decade, factories were operating in Ireland, Brazil, Singapore and Mexico, supplying markets around the world. Sales had reached $180 million.

In 1991, Stiefel Laboratories founded Glades Pharmaceuticals to market generic dermatology products. Glades Pharmaceuticals later matured to market a full line of products including branded-generic and branded products. Brevoxyl/Solugel Creamy Wash is launched as the first benzoyl peroxide product containing dimethyl isosorbide to dissolve the benzoyl peroxide crystals and reduce irritation.

== 2000 onward ==
In 2000, Stiefel Introduced Physiogel, a brand of skin care products.

In 2006, Stiefel Laboratories made its first major corporate acquisition when it acquired California-based Connetics Corporation, a specialty pharmaceutical company focused on the development and commercialization of innovative therapeutics for the dermatology market.

In 2007, Revaléskin was introduced formulated with the antioxidant ingredient, CoffeeBerry.

William D. (Bill) Humphries was promoted to president of Stiefel Laboratories, Inc., the privately held dermatology company in 2008. An acquisition of Barrier Therapeutics, Inc. ("Barrier Therapeutics") on August 6, 2008 was also completed.

Stiefel was acquired by GlaxoSmithKline in July 2009 to create a new specialist dermatology business. As part of the acquisition, Stiefel Laboratories is now branded "Stiefel, a GSK company" in advertising.

Stiefel launched MaxClarity and received FDA approval of two Rx products in the United States, Sorilux Foam and Veltin Gel in 2010.

In 2012, customers began to have trouble sourcing Stiefel's popular anti-acne treatment, PanOxyl.

In 2013, GSK discontinued the UK version of Stiefel's popular skin drying treatment, Zeasorb.
