= United States v. Glaxo Group Ltd. =

- Supreme Court of the United States

Argued November 9, 1972 Decided January 22, 1973
- Full case name: United States v. Glaxo Group Ltd.
- Citations: 410 U.S. 52 (more) 93 S. Ct. 861; 35 L. Ed. 2d 104; 1973 U.S. LEXIS 26; 176 U.S.P.Q. (BNA) 289; 1973 Trade Cas. (CCH) ¶ 74,323

Case history
- Prior: 328 F. Supp. 709 (D.D.C. 1971); probable jurisdiction noted, 405 U.S. 914 (1972).

Holding
- When a patent is directly involved in an antitrust violation, the Government may challenge the validity of the patent.

Court membership
- Chief Justice Warren E. Burger Associate Justices William O. Douglas · William J. Brennan Jr. Potter Stewart · Byron White; Thurgood Marshall · Harry Blackmun; Lewis F. Powell Jr. · William Rehnquist

Case opinions
- Majority: White, joined by Burger, Douglas, Brennan, Marshall, Powell
- Dissent: Rehnquist, joined by Stewart and Blackmun

Laws applied
- Sherman Act

United States v. Glaxo Group Ltd., 410 U.S. 52 (1973), is a 1973 decision of the United States Supreme Court in which the Court held that (1) when a patent is directly involved in an antitrust violation, the Government may challenge the validity of the patent; and (2) ordinarily, in patent-antitrust cases, "[m]andatory selling on specified terms and compulsory patent licensing at reasonable charges are recognized antitrust remedies."

== Background ==
Imperial Chemical Industries (ICI) and Glaxo Group Ltd. (Glaxo) each owned patents covering various aspects of the antifungal drug griseofulvin. They "pooled" the patents (that is, cross-licensed one another), subject to express licensing restrictions that the chemical from which the "finished" form of the drug (tablets and capsules) was made must not be resold in bulk form. ICI and Glaxo licensed three "brand name" drug companies to make and sell the drug in finished form only. The purpose of this restriction was to keep the drug chemical out of the hands of small companies that might act as price-cutters, and the effect was to maintain stable, uniform prices.

The Department of Justice Antitrust Division sued, alleging violations of § 1 of the Sherman Act and also alleging that the patents were invalid. The district court granted summary judgment against the defendants on the antitrust charges, but dismissed the invalidity claims on the ground that the Government lacked standing to challenge patent validity. The district court also denied the Government’s request for mandatory selling of the bulk chemical and compulsory licensing, on reasonable terms. The Government then appealed to the Supreme Court.

== Opinion of the Court ==
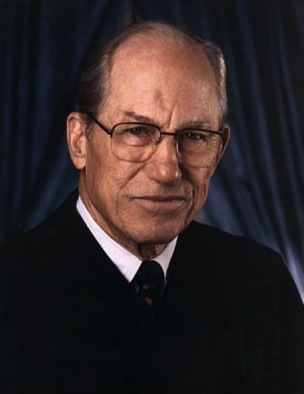
Justice Byron White wrote the majority opinion for the Court

Justice Byron White wrote the 6–3 majority opinion for the Court. Justice William Rehnquist wrote a dissenting opinion in which Justices Potter Stewart and Harry Blackmun joined.

=== Standing ===
The Court observed that the defendants had been adjudged to be antitrust violators. The Court said that while "we do not recognize unlimited authority in the Government to attack a patent by basing an antitrust claim on the simple assertion that the patent is invalid", whether the patents are valid or invalid could significantly affect what remedies were appropriate. Therefore, when the Government presents substantial claims for relief, a court should entertain the Government's validity challenge.

=== Relief ===
The Court noted that mandatory sales and reasonable royalty compulsory licensing were "well established forms of relief when necessary to an effective remedy, particularly where patents have provided the leverage for or have contributed to the antitrust violation adjudicated." Here, the evidence showed that the patents "gave the appellees the economic leverage with which to insist upon and enforce the bulk-sales." Reasonable royalty licensing was necessary to assure competitive access to the input factor for production of the drug. In addition, both mandatory sales of "bulk-form griseofulvin on reasonable and nondiscriminatory terms" and grants of "patent licenses at reasonable-royalty rates to all bona fide applicants" were necessary in order to "'pry open to competition' the griseofulvin market that 'has been closed by defendants' illegal restraints.'"

== Subsequent developments ==
The Glaxo case was brought, initially, as a test case on government standing to challenge patent validity—a vehicle for overturning or at least limiting the 1897 decision of the Supreme Court in United States v. Bell Tel. Co. Substantively, Glaxo was one of a series of antitrust challenges against patent license restrictions on the sale of bulk drugs. Such restrictions were used to keep the bulk chemical form of drugs out of the hands of generic drug houses and other potential price-cutters, so that "finished" drug prices could be maintained at high levels. (The Supreme Court's statement of the facts in its Glaxo opinion explains this point.)

The defendants asserted no health and safety or other factual defenses. The district court then granted three summary judgment motions in the government's favor on the issue of antitrust violation, granted the defendants' motion to dismiss the patent validity challenges, and denied any significant relief. The case then went to the Supreme Court on a record consisting of legal briefs and supporting affidavits, without live testimony: there had not been a single day of trial in the usual sense—nothing but legal argumentation.

After the Supreme Court's decision, the government found itself possessed of a new power to challenge antitrust defendants' patents. However, the government did not rush to exploit this power. It appears that only one reported decision has involved a patent validity challenge based on the doctrine of the Glaxo case.
